= List of awards and nominations received by Saturday Night Live =

This is a list of notable awards Saturday Night Live has won. One of the longest running series on U.S. television at 50 seasons as of 2025, since its debut, the show has won and been nominated for numerous awards, both creative and technical. The show has won 94 Primetime Emmy Awards, 4 Peabody Awards, and 5 Writers Guild of America Awards. Lorne Michaels, co-creator and executive producer, received a star on the Hollywood Walk of Fame for his work on the series.

== Total awards and nominations for the cast and hosts ==
Total awards and nominations for performers, including awards for writing and as part of an ensemble
Performer	Nominations	Awards
Tina Fey	28	13
Amy Poehler	17	11
Seth Meyers	12	11
Darrell Hammond	12	10
Maya Rudolph	14	9
Jimmy Fallon	9	8
Kenan Thompson	14	7
Fred Armisen	10	7
Chris Parnell	7	7
Horatio Sanz	7	7
Kristen Wiig	16	6
Rachel Dratch	7	6
Will Forte	6	6
Justin Timberlake	10	5
Tracy Morgan	8	5
Molly Shannon	7	5
Chris Kattan	7	5
Kate McKinnon	21	4
Colin Jost	20	4
Robert Smigel	19	4
Al Franken	15	4
Tom Davis	13	4
Bill Hader	12	4
Andy Samberg	11	4
Dana Carvey	9	4
Ana Gasteyer	5	4
Jason Sudeikis	4	4
Tom Schiller	10	3
Jeff Richards	4	3
Betty White	3	3
John Mulaney	15	2
Aidy Bryant	7	2
Alan Zweibel	6	2
Tim Meadows	4	2
Chevy Chase	4	2
Michael O'Donoghue	4	2
Cheri Oteri	3	2
Mike Myers	3	2
Colin Quinn	3	2
Bobby Moynihan	3	2
Dean Edwards	2	2
Casey Wilson	2	2
Finesse Mitchell	2	2
Michael Che	11	1
Melissa McCarthy	10	1
Vanessa Bayer	6	1
Leslie Jones	6	1
Dan Aykroyd	6	1
John Belushi	5	1
Taran Killam	5	1
Alec Baldwin	4	1
Tim Robinson	4	1
Cecily Strong	4	1
Eddie Murphy	4	1
A. Whitney Brown	4	1
Mikey Day	4	1
Jerry Minor	3	1
Gilda Radner	3	1
Phil Hartman	3	1
Jay Pharoah	2	1
Sasheer Zamata	2	1
Kyle Mooney	2	1
Bill Murray	2	1
Beck Bennett	2	1
Pete Davidson	2	1
Louis C.K.	4	0
Andrew Dismukes	4	0
Adam Sandler	4	0
Larry David	3	0
David Spade	3	0
Brian Doyle-Murray	3	0
Don Novello	3	0
Norm Macdonald	2	0
Jane Curtin	2	0
Mike O'Brien	2	0
Jon Lovitz	2	0
Joe Piscopo	2	0
Harry Shearer	2	0

== American Cinema Editors Awards ==
Year	Category	Individual(s)	Position	Result	Ref.
2021	Best Edited Variety Talk/Sketch Show or Special	Sean McIlraith; Ryan McIlraith; Christopher Salerno; Devon Schwab; Ryan Spears; Paul Del Gesso; Jason Watkins	Editor; Editor; Editor; Editor; Editor; Editor; Editor	Nominated	
2022	Best Edited Variety Talk/Sketch Show or Special	Paul Del Gesso; Yanni Feder; Daniel Garcia; Jack Klink; Richard Lampasone; Ryan McIlraith; Sean McIlraith; Steven Pierce; Christopher Salerno; Devon Schwab; Ryan Spears; Jason Watkins	Editor; Editor; Editor; Editor; Editor; Editor; Editor; Editor; Editor; Editor; Editor; Editor	Nominated	

== American Comedy Awards ==
Year	Category	Individual(s)	Result	Ref.
1989	Funniest Supporting Male Performer in a TV Series	Dana Carvey	Won	
1990	Funniest Supporting Male Performer in a TV Series	Dana Carvey	Won	
1990	Funniest Supporting Female Performer in a TV Series	Jan Hooks	Nominated	
1991	Funniest Supporting Male Performer in a TV Series	Dana Carvey	Won	
1999	Funniest Male Guest Appearance in a TV Series	Alec Baldwin	Nominated	
2001	Funniest Male Guest Appearance in a TV Series	Dana Carvey	Nominated	
2001	Funniest Male Guest Appearance in a TV Series	Christopher Walken	Won	
2001	Funniest Supporting Male Performer in a TV Series	Will Ferrell	Nominated	
2014	Best Comedy Series	Saturday Night Live	Nominated	
2014	Comedy Supporting Actor – TV	Bill Hader	Won	
2014	Comedy Supporting Actress – TV	Vanessa Bayer	Nominated	
2014	Comedy Supporting Actress – TV	Kate McKinnon	Won	

== Annie Awards ==
Year	Category	Nominee(s)	Result	Ref.
1997	Best Animated Short Subject	"The Ambiguously Gay Duo #2"	Nominated	
1997	Best Animated Short Subject	"The Ambiguously Gay Duo #3"	Nominated	
1997	Best Achievement in Producing	J. J. Sedelmaier (for "The Ambiguously Gay Duo #2")	Nominated	

== Art Directors Guild Awards ==
Year	Category	Episode(s)	Individual(s)	Position	Result	Ref.
2009	Awards Show, Variety, Music or Non-Fiction Program	641 (34.5)	Eugene Lee; Leo 'Akira' Yoshimura; Keith Ian Raywood; N. Joseph DeTullio; Halina Marki; Mark Rudolf	Production Designer; Production Designer; Production Designer; Art Director; Lead Scenic Artist; Lead Scenic Artist	Nominated	
2010	Multi-Camera, Variety or Unscripted Series	657 (34.21)	Eugene Lee; Leo 'Akira' Yoshimura; Keith Ian Raywood; N. Joseph DeTullio; Halina Marki; Mark Rudolf	Production Designer; Production Designer; Production Designer; Art Director; Lead Scenic Artist; Lead Scenic Artist	Nominated	
2011	Multi-Camera, Variety or Unscripted Series	679 (35.21)	Eugene Lee; Akira Yoshimura; Keith Ian Raywood; N. Joseph DeTullio	Production Designer; Production Designer; Production Designer; Production Designer	Won	
2012	Multi-Camera, Variety or Unscripted Series	724 (36.22)	Eugene Lee; Akira Yoshimura; Keith Ian Raywood; N. Joseph DeTullio	Production Designer; Production Designer; Production Designer; Production Designer	Won	
2013	Multi-Camera, Variety or Unscripted Series	702 (37.22)	Eugene Lee; Akira Yoshimura; Keith Ian Raywood; N. Joseph DeTullio	Production Designer; Production Designer; Production Designer; Production Designer	Won	
2014	Multi-Camera, Variety or Unscripted Series	740 (38.16)	Eugene Lee; Akira Yoshimura; Keith Ian Raywood; N. Joseph DeTullio	Production Designer; Production Designer; Production Designer; Production Designer	Nominated	
2015	Variety, Competition, Reality or Game Show Series	761 (39.16), 762 (39.17), and 771 (40.05)	Eugene Lee; Akira Yoshimura; Keith Ian Raywood; N. Joseph DeTullio	Production Designer; Production Designer; Production Designer; Production Designer	Nominated	
2016	Variety, Competition, Reality or Game Show Series	785 (40.19), 788 (41.01), and 790 (41.03)	Eugene Lee; Akira Yoshimura; Keith Ian Raywood; N. Joseph DeTullio	Production Designer; Production Designer; Production Designer; Production Designer	Nominated	
2017	Variety, Reality or Competition Series	799 (41.12), 803 (41.16), and 812 (42.04)	Eugene Lee; Akira Yoshimura; Keith Ian Raywood; N. Joseph DeTullio	Production Designer; Production Designer; Production Designer; Production Designer	Won	
2018	Variety or Competition Series/Awards or Event Special	820 (42.12), 822 (42.14), and 833 (43.04)	Eugene Lee; Akira Yoshimura; Keith Ian Raywood; N. Joseph DeTullio	Production Designer; Production Designer; Production Designer; Production Designer	Nominated	
2019	Variety, Reality or Competition Series	845 (43.16), 847 (42.18), and 848 (43.19)	Eugene Lee; Akira Yoshimura; Keith Ian Raywood; N. Joseph DeTullio	Production Designer; Production Designer; Production Designer; Production Designer	Nominated	
2020	Variety, Reality or Competition Series	864 (44.14), 866 (44.16), and 868 (44.18)	Keith Raywood; Akira Yoshimura; N. Joseph DeTullio; Eugene Lee; Melissa Shakun; Andrea Purcigliotti; Charlotte Hayes Harrison	Production Designer; Production Designer; Production Designer; Production Designer; Art Director; Art Director; Graphic Designer	Nominated	
2021	Variety, Reality or Competition Series	893 (46.04), 894 (46.05), and 895 (46.06)	Keith Raywood; Akira Yoshimura; N. Joseph DeTullio; Eugene Lee	Production Designer; Production Designer; Production Designer; Production Designer	Won	
2022	Variety, Reality or Competition Series	900 (46.11), 904 (46.15), and 911 (47.02)	Keith Raywood; Akira Yoshimura; N. Joseph DeTullio; Eugene Lee	Production Designer; Production Designer; Production Designer; Production Designer	Nominated	
2023	Variety, Reality or Competition Series	934 (48.04)	Keith Raywood; Akira Yoshimura; N. Joseph DeTullio; Eugene Lee; Melissa Shakun; Andrea Purcigliotti; Charlotte Harrison; Sabrina Lederer; Patrick Lynch	Production Designer; Production Designer; Production Designer; Production Designer; Art Director; Art Director; Set Designer; Set Designer; Set Designer	Won	
2024	Variety, Reality or Competition Series	951 (49.03)	Keith Raywood; Akira Yoshimura; N. Joseph DeTullio; Andrea Purcigliotti; Melissa Shakun; Patrick Lynch; Charlotte Harrison; Sabrina Lederer	Production Designer; Production Designer; Production Designer; Production Designer; Art Director; Art Director; Set Designer; Set Designer	Nominated	
2025	Variety or Reality Series	971 (50.03)	Keith Raywood; Akira Yoshimura; N. Joseph DeTullio; Andrea Purcigliotti; Melissa Shakun; Patrick Lynch; Charlotte Harrison; Sabrina Lederer	Production Designer; Production Designer; Production Designer; Production Designer; Art Director; Art Director; Set Designer; Set Designer	Won	
2026	Variety or Reality Series	982 (50.14)	Keith Raywood; Akira Yoshimura; N. Joseph DeTullio; Andrea Purcigliotti; Melissa Shakun; Patrick Lynch; Charlotte Harrison; Sabrina Lederer; Diana Shaller; Tara Donnelly; Sara Parks	Production Designer; Production Designer; Production Designer; Production Designer; Art Director; Art Director; Set Designer; Set Designer; Scenic Artist; Graphic Designer; Set Decorator	Won	
2026	Variety Special	Saturday Night Live; 50th Anniversary Special	Akira Yoshimura; N. Joseph DeTullio; Keith Ian Raywood; Melissa Shakun; Patrick Lynch; Sabrina Lederer; Charlotte Harrison; Diana Shaller; Tara Donnelly	Production Designer; Production Designer; Production Designer; Art Director; Art Director; Set Designer; Set Designer; Scenic Artist; Graphic Designer	Won	
* denotes nominated works with awards pending presentation and announcement.

== ASIFA East Animation Festival Awards ==
Year	Category	Episode(s)	Individual(s)	Position	Result	Ref.
2007	Sponsored Films	602 (31.17)	David Wachtenheim; Robert Marianetti	Animator; Animator	2nd Place	

== Astra TV Awards ==
Year	Category	Nominee(s)	Result	Ref.
2021	Best Broadcast Network or Cable Sketch Series, Variety Series, Talk Show or Comedy/Variety Special	Saturday Night Live	Nominated	
2022	Best Broadcast Network or Cable Sketch Series, Variety Series, Talk Show or Comedy/Variety Special	Saturday Night Live	Nominated	
2022	Best Supporting Actor in a Broadcast Network or Cable Series, Comedy	Bowen Yang	Nominated	
2024	Best Variety Series or Special	Saturday Night Live	Nominated	
2024	Best Guest Actor in a Comedy Series	Steve Martin & Martin Short	Nominated	
2024	Best Guest Actor in a Comedy Series	Pedro Pascal	Won	
2024	Best Guest Actress in a Comedy Series	Jenna Ortega	Nominated	
2024	Best Guest Actress in a Comedy Series	Aubrey Plaza	Nominated	
2024	Best Variety Series or Special	Saturday Night Live	Nominated	
2024	Best Saturday Night Live Host	Timothée Chalamet	Nominated	
2024	Best Saturday Night Live Host	Ryan Gosling	Won	
2024	Best Saturday Night Live Host	Kate McKinnon	Nominated	
2024	Best Saturday Night Live Host	Maya Rudolph	Nominated	
2024	Best Saturday Night Live Host	Emma Stone	Nominated	
2024	Best Saturday Night Live Host	Kristen Wiig	Nominated	
2025	Best Variety Series or Special	Ladies & Gentlemen... 50 Years of SNL Music	Nominated	
2025	Best Variety Series or Special	Saturday Night Live	Nominated	
2025	Best Variety Series or Special	Saturday Night Live 50th Anniversary Special	Nominated	
2025	Best Guest Actor in a Comedy Series	Timothée Chalamet	Nominated	
2025	Best Guest Actress in a Comedy Series	Quinta Brunson	Nominated	
2025	Best Guest Actress in a Comedy Series	Ariana Grande	Nominated	
2025	Best Original Song	"Adam Sandler's Song: 50 Years"	Won	
2026	Best Talk or Variety Series	Saturday Night Live	Nominated	
2026	Best Guest Actor in a Comedy Series	Ryan Gosling	Nominated	

== BET Comedy Awards ==
Year	Category	Nominee(s)	Result	Ref.
2005	Outstanding Comedy Variety Series	Saturday Night Live	Won	

== Black Reel TV Awards ==
Year	Category	Individual(s)	Result	Ref.
2017	Outstanding Supporting Actress, Comedy Series	Leslie Jones	Nominated	
2017	Outstanding Guest Actor, Comedy Series	Dave Chappelle	Won	
2017	Outstanding Guest Actor, Comedy Series	Dwayne Johnson	Nominated	
2018	Outstanding Guest Actor, Comedy Series	Chadwick Boseman	Nominated	
2018	Outstanding Guest Actor, Comedy Series	Sterling K. Brown	Nominated	
2018	Outstanding Guest Actor, Comedy Series	Donald Glover	Nominated	
2018	Outstanding Guest Actress, Comedy Series	Tiffany Haddish	Won	
2019	Outstanding Supporting Actor, Comedy Series	Kenan Thompson	Nominated	
2019	Outstanding Supporting Actress, Comedy Series	Leslie Jones	Nominated	
2019	Outstanding Guest Actor, Comedy Series	Idris Elba	Nominated	
2020	Outstanding Supporting Actor, Comedy Series	Kenan Thompson	Won	
2020	Outstanding Guest Actor, Comedy Series	Eddie Murphy	Won	
2021	Outstanding Supporting Actor, Comedy Series	Kenan Thompson	Won	
2021	Outstanding Guest Actor, Comedy Series	Dave Chappelle	Won	
2021	Outstanding Guest Actor, Comedy Series	Daniel Kaluuya	Nominated	
2021	Outstanding Guest Actor, Comedy Series	Regé-Jean Page	Nominated	
2021	Outstanding Guest Actress, Comedy Series	Regina King	Nominated	
2021	Outstanding Guest Actress, Comedy Series	Maya Rudolph	Nominated	
2022	Outstanding Guest Actress, Comedy Series	Lizzo	Nominated	
2024	Outstanding Guest Performance in a Comedy Series	Quinta Brunson	Nominated	

== Cinema Eye Honors ==
Year	Category	Title	Individual(s)	Position	Result	Ref.
2026	Outstanding Anthology Series	SNL50: Beyond Saturday Night	Morgan Neville; Caitrin Rogers; Juaquin Cambron	Executive Producer; Executive Producer; Executive Producer	Nominated	

== Costume Designers Guild Awards ==
Year	Category	Episode(s)	Individual(s)	Position	Result	Ref.
2012	Outstanding Contemporary Television Series	—N/a	Tom Broecker; Eric Justian	Costume Designer; Costume Designer	Nominated	
2014	Outstanding Contemporary Television Series	—N/a	Tom Broecker; Eric Justian	Costume Designer; Costume Designer	Nominated	
2015	Outstanding Contemporary Television Series	—N/a	Tom Broecker; Eric Justian	Costume Designer; Costume Designer	Nominated	
2019	Excellence in Variety, Reality-Competition or Live Television	—N/a	Tom Broecker; Eric Justian	Costume Designer; Costume Designer	Nominated	
2020	Excellence in Variety, Reality-Competition or Live Television	866 (44.16)	Tom Broecker; Eric Justian	Costume Designer; Costume Designer	Nominated	
2021	Excellence in Variety, Reality-Competition or Live Television	894 (46.05)	Tom Broecker; Eric Justian	Costume Designer; Costume Designer	Nominated	
2022	Excellence in Variety, Reality-Competition or Live Television	912 (47.03)	Tom Broecker; Eric Justian	Costume Designer; Costume Designer	Won	
2023	Excellence in Variety, Reality-Competition or Live Television	931 (48.01)	Tom Broecker; Ashley Dudek; Cristina Natividad	Costume Designer; Costume Designer; Costume Designer	Nominated	
2024	Excellence in Variety, Reality-Competition or Live Television	940 (48.10)	Tom Broecker; Christina Natividad; Ashley Dudek	Costume Designer; Costume Designer; Costume Designer	Nominated	
2025	Excellence in Variety, Reality-Competition or Live Television	971 (50.03)	Tom Broecker; Ashley Dudek; Christina Natividad	Costume Designer; Costume Designer; Costume Designer	Nominated	
2026	Excellence in Variety, Reality-Competition or Live Television	Saturday Night Live; 50th Anniversary Special	Tom Broecker; Christina Natividad; Ashley Dudek	Costume Designer; Costume Designer; Costume Designer	Won	

== Critics' Choice Documentary Awards ==
Year	Category	Nominee(s)	Result	Ref.
2025	Best Music Documentary	Ladies & Gentlemen... 50 Years of SNL Music	Nominated	
2025	Best Limited Documentary Series	SNL50: Beyond Saturday Night	Nominated	
2025	Best Editing	James Lester, Oz Rodríguez, and John MacDonald (Note: for Ladies & Gentlemen... 50 Years of SNL Music.)	Nominated	

== Critics' Choice Television Awards ==
Year	Category	Nominee(s)	Role(s)	Result	Ref.
2016	Best Actress in a Comedy Series	Kate McKinnon	Hillary Clinton / Various Characters	Won	
2016	Best Guest Performer in a Comedy Series	Alec Baldwin	Donald Trump	Won	
2016	Best Guest Performer in a Comedy Series	Larry David	Various Characters	Nominated	
2022	Best Supporting Actor in a Comedy Series	Bowen Yang	Various Characters	Nominated	
2022	Best Supporting Actress in a Comedy Series	Cecily Strong	Various Characters	Nominated	
2026	Best Supporting Actress in a Comedy Series	Ego Nwodim	Various Characters	Nominated	
2026	Best Comedy Special	Saturday Night Live 50th Anniversary Special	—N/a	Won	

== Directors Guild of America Awards ==
Year	Episode(s)	Category	Individual(s)	Role	Result	Ref.
2001	492 (26.07)	Outstanding Directing – Musical/Variety	Beth McCarthy-Miller; Stefani Cohen; Robert Caminiti; Mark Jankeloff; Gena Rositano; Chris Kelly	Director; Associate Director; Associate Director; Associate Director; Stage Manager; Stage Manager	Won	
2004	536 (28.11)	Outstanding Directing – Musical/Variety	Beth McCarthy-Miller; Robert Caminiti; Stefani Cohen; Mark Jankeloff; Gena Rositano Wilson; Christopher Kelly	Director; Associate Director; Associate Director; Associate Director; Stage Manager; Stage Manager	Nominated	
2007	609 (32.05)	Outstanding Directing – Musical/Variety	Don Roy King; Stefani Cohen; Robert Caminiti; Mark Jankeloff; Gena Wilson; Christopher Kelly	Director; Associate Director; Associate Director; Associate Director; Stage Manager; Stage Manager	Nominated	
2009	—N/a	Outstanding Directing – Musical/Variety	Don Roy King; Robert Caminiti; Stefani Cohen; Mark Jankeloff; Christopher Kelly; Gena Wilson	Director; Associate Director; Associate Director; Associate Director; Stage Manager; Stage Manager	Nominated	
2010	657 (34.21)	Outstanding Directing – Musical/Variety	Don Roy King; Stefani Cohen; Bob Caminiti; Mark Jankeloff; Gena Wilson; Chris Kelly	Director; Associate Director; Associate Director; Associate Director; Stage Manager; Stage Manager	Nominated	
2011	679 (35.21)	Outstanding Directing – Musical/Variety	Don Roy King; Robert Caminiti; Stefani Cohen; Michael Poole; Gena Rositano; Christopher Kelly	Director; Associate Director; Associate Director; Associate Director; Stage Manager; Stage Manager	Nominated	
2012	702 (36.22)	Outstanding Directing – Musical/Variety	Don Roy King; Bob Caminiti; Stefani Cohen; Michael Poole; Gena Rositano; Chris Kelly	Director; Associate Director; Associate Director; Associate Director; Stage Manager; Stage Manager	Nominated	
2013	724 (37.22)	Outstanding Directing – Musical/Variety	Don Roy King; Michael Mancini; Michael Poole; Bob Caminiti; Gena Rositano; Chris Kelly	Director; Associate Director; Associate Director; Associate Director; Stage Manager; Stage Manager	Nominated	
2014	740 (38.16)	Outstanding Directing – Variety Series	Don Roy King; Michael Mancini; Michael Poole; Matt Yonks; Bob Caminiti; Gena Rositano; Chris Kelly	Director; Associate Director; Associate Director; Associate Director; Associate Director; Stage Manager; Stage Manager	Won	
2015	770 (40.04)	Outstanding Directing – Variety Series	Don Roy King; Michael Mancini; Michael Poole; Bob Caminiti; Gena Rositano; Chris Kelly	Director; Associate Director; Associate Director; Associate Director; Stage Manager; Stage Manager	Nominated	
2016	790 (41.03)	Outstanding Directing – Variety Series	Don Roy King; Michael Mancini; Michael Poole; Bob Caminiti; Gena Rositano; Chris Kelly	Director; Associate Director; Associate Director; Associate Director; Stage Manager; Stage Manager	Nominated	
2016	Saturday Night Live; 40th Anniversary Special	Outstanding Directing – Variety Specials	Don Roy King; Michael Mancini; Michael Poole; Bob Caminiti; Dan Dome; Gena Rositano; Chris Kelly; Joey Despenzero; Lynn Finkel; Eddie Valk	Director; Associate Director; Associate Director; Associate Director; Associate Director; Stage Manager; Stage Manager; Stage Manager; Stage Manager; Stage Manager	Won	
2017	814 (42.06)	Outstanding Directing – Variety Series	Don Roy King; Michael Mancini; Michael Poole; Bob Caminiti; Gena Rositano; Chris Kelly	Director; Associate Director; Associate Director; Associate Director; Stage Manager; Stage Manager	Won	
2018	826 (42.18)	Outstanding Directing – Variety Series	Don Roy King; Michael Mancini; Michael Poole; Bob Caminiti; Gena Rositano; Chris Kelly	Director; Associate Director; Associate Director; Associate Director; Stage Manager; Stage Manager	Won	
2019	851 (44.1)	Outstanding Directing – Variety Series	Don Roy King; Mike Mancini; Michael Poole; Bob Caminiti; Gena Rositano; Chris Kelly	Director; Associate Director; Associate Director; Associate Director; Stage Manager; Stage Manager	Won	
2020	881 (45.10)	Outstanding Directing – Variety Series	Don Roy King; Mike Poole; Michael Mancini; Laura Ouziel-Mack; Gena Rositano; Chris Kelly	Director; Associate Director; Associate Director; Associate Director; Stage Manager; Stage Manager	Won	
2021	895 (46.06)	Outstanding Directing – Variety Series	Don Roy King; Michael Mancini; Michael Poole; Laura Ouziel-Mack; Gena Rositano; Chris Kelly; Eddie Valk	Director; Associate Director; Associate Director; Associate Director; Stage Manager; Stage Manager; Stage Manager	Won	
2022	908 (46.19)	Outstanding Directing – Variety Series	Don Roy King; Michael Mancini; Michael Poole; Laura Ouziel-Mack; Gena Rositano; Chris Kelly; Eddie Valk	Director; Associate Director; Associate Director; Associate Director; Stage Manager; Stage Manager; Stage Manager	Won	
2023	934 (48.04)	Outstanding Directing – Variety Series	Liz Patrick; Michael Mancini; Michael Poole; Laura Ouziel-Mack; Gena Rositano; Chris Kelly; Eddie Valk	Director; Associate Director; Associate Director; Associate Director; Stage Manager; Stage Manager; Stage Manager	Won	
2024	942 (48.12)	Outstanding Directing – Variety Series	Michael Mancini; Liz Patrick; Janine DeVito; Michael Poole; Laura Ouziel-Mack; Gena Rositano; Chris Kelly; Eddie Valk	Director; Director; Associate Director; Associate Director; Associate Director; Stage Manager; Stage Manager; Stage Manager	Won	
2025	973 (50.05)	Outstanding Directing – Variety/Talk/News/Sports – Regularly Scheduled Programming	Liz Patrick; Michael Mancini; Michael Poole; Laura Ouziel-Mack; Janine DeVito; Amy Mancini; Gena Rositano; Chris Kelly; Eddie Valk; Tom Ucciferri	Director; Associate Director; Associate Director; Associate Director; Associate Director; Associate Director; Stage Manager; Stage Manager; Stage Manager; Stage Manager	Won	
2026	Saturday Night Live; 50th Anniversary Special	Outstanding Directing – Variety	Liz Patrick; Michael Mancini; Michael Poole; Laura Ouziel Mack; Janine DeVito; Amy Mancini; Dan Dome; Gena Rositano; Chris Kelly; Eddie Valk; Peter Epstein; Karen Tasch Weiss; Steve Bautista; Joey Despenzero; Frank Fernandez; Doug Fogel; Jeffry Gitter; Cyndi Owgang; Elise Reaves; Niclana Tolmasoff; Leslie Williams	Director; Associate Director; Associate Director; Associate Director; Associate Director; Associate Director; Associate Director; Stage Manager; Stage Manager; Stage Manager; Stage Manager; Stage Manager; Stage Manager; Stage Manager; Stage Manager; Stage Manager; Stage Manager; Stage Manager; Stage Manager; Stage Manager; Stage Manager	Won	
2026	SNL50: The Homecoming Concert	Outstanding Directing – Variety	Beth McCarthy-Miller; Susan Sullivan; Lynn Finkel; Linda Carrizzo; Joey Despenzero; Phyllis Digilio-Kent; John Esposito; Andrew Feigin; Steve Hollander; Greg Kasoff; Alissa Levisohn Hoyo; Arthur Lewis; Jennifer Marquet; Cyndi Owgang; Jason Pacella; Tammy Raab; Elise Reaves; Cheryl Teetzel-Moore; Niclana Tolmasoff; Bret Warren; Ari Woog	Director; Associate Director; Stage Manager; Stage Manager; Stage Manager; Stage Manager; Stage Manager; Stage Manager; Stage Manager; Stage Manager; Stage Manager; Stage Manager; Stage Manager; Stage Manager; Stage Manager; Stage Manager; Stage Manager; Stage Manager; Stage Manager; Stage Manager; Stage Manager	Nominated	

== Dorian Awards ==
Year	Category	Individual(s)	Performance	Result	Ref.
2010	TV Musical or Comedy Performance of the Year	Kristen Wiig	—N/a	Nominated	
2015	TV Musical Performance of the Year	Prince	—N/a	Nominated	
2017	TV Musical Performance of the Year	Kate McKinnon	"Hallelujah"	Won	
2018	TV Musical Performance of the Year	Kate McKinnon	"(Kellyanne) Conway!"	Won	
2021	Best Supporting TV Performance	Bowen Yang	—N/a	Nominated	
2021	Best TV Musical Performance	Bowen Yang	"Loverboy"	Nominated	
2021	Best TV Musical Performance	Punkie Johnson; Anya Taylor-Joy; Lil Nas X Kate McKinnon; Bowen Yang	"Pride Month Song"	Nominated	

== Grammy Awards ==
Year	Category	Artist(s)	Work	Result	Ref.
1978	Best Comedy Recording	NBC's Saturday Night Live cast (Note: Dan Aykroyd, John Belushi, Chevy Chase, Jane Curtin, Garrett Morris, Laraine Newman, and Gilda Radner.)	Saturday Night Live	Nominated	

== Make-Up Artists & Hair Stylists Guild Awards ==
Year	Category	Individual(s)	Position	Result	Ref.
2003	Best Character Makeup – Television Series	Louie Zakarian; Andrea Miller	Makeup Artist; Makeup Artist	Nominated	
2016	Best Special Makeup Effects in Television and New Media Series	Louie Zakarian; Jason Milani	Makeup Artist; Makeup Artist	Nominated	
2017	Best Contemporary Makeup in Television and New Media Series	Louie Zakarian; Amy Tagliamonti; Jason Milani	Makeup Artist; Makeup Artist; Makeup Artist	Nominated	
2017	Best Period and/or Character Makeup in Television and New Media Series	Louie Zakarian; Amy Tagliamonti; Jason Milani	Makeup Artist; Makeup Artist; Makeup Artist	Nominated	
2017	Best Period and/or Character Hair Styling in Television and New Media Series	Jodi Mancuso; Jennifer Serio; Inga Thrasher	Hairstylist; Hairstylist; Hairstylist	Nominated	
2017	Best Special Makeup Effects in Television and New Media Series	Louie Zakarian; Jason Milani; Tom Denier Jr.	Makeup Artist; Makeup Artist; Makeup Artist	Nominated	
2018	Best Contemporary Makeup in Television and New Media Series	Louie Zakarian; Amy Tagliamonti; Jason Milani	Makeup Artist; Makeup Artist; Makeup Artist	Nominated	
2018	Best Contemporary Hair Styling in Television and New Media Series	Jodi Mancuso; Jennifer Serio; Inga Thrasher	Hairstylist; Hairstylist; Hairstylist	Nominated	
2018	Best Period and/or Character Makeup in Television and New Media Series	Louie Zakarian; Amy Tagliamonti; Jason Milani	Makeup Artist; Makeup Artist; Makeup Artist	Nominated	
2018	Best Period and/or Character Hair Styling in Television and New Media Series	Jodi Mancuso; Jennifer Serio; Inga Thrasher	Hairstylist; Hairstylist; Hairstylist	Nominated	
2018	Best Special Makeup Effects in Television and New Media Series	Louie Zakarian; Jason Milani; Tom Denier Jr.	Makeup Artist; Makeup Artist; Makeup Artist	Nominated	
2019	Best Contemporary Makeup in Television and New Media Series	Louie Zakarian; Amy Tagliamonti; Jason Milani	Makeup Artist; Makeup Artist; Makeup Artist	Nominated	
2019	Best Period and/or Character Makeup in Television and New Media Series	Louie Zakarian; Amy Tagliamonti; Jason Milani	Makeup Artist; Makeup Artist; Makeup Artist	Nominated	
2019	Best Special Makeup Effects in Television and New Media Series	Louie Zakarian; Jason Milani; Tom Denier Jr.	Makeup Artist; Makeup Artist; Makeup Artist	Nominated	
2020	Best Contemporary Makeup in a Motion Picture Made for Television or Special	Louie Zakarian; Amy Tagliamonti; Jason Milani	Makeup Artist; Makeup Artist; Makeup Artist	Won	
2020	Best Period and/or Character Makeup in a Motion Picture Made for Television or Special	Louie Zakarian; Amy Tagliamonti; Jason Milani	Makeup Artist; Makeup Artist; Makeup Artist	Won	
2020	Best Special Makeup Effects in Television and New Media Series	Louie Zakarian; Jason Milani; Tom Denier Jr.	Makeup Artist; Makeup Artist; Makeup Artist	Won	
2021	Best Contemporary Makeup in a Television Special, One Hour or More Live Program Series or Movie for Television	Louie Zakarian; Amy Tagliamonti; Jason Milani; Joanna Pisani	Makeup Artist; Makeup Artist; Makeup Artist; Makeup Artist	Won	
2021	Best Contemporary Hair Styling in a Television Special, One Hour or More Live Program Series or Movie for Television	Jodi Mancuso; Cara Hannah; Inga Thrasher	Hairstylist; Hairstylist; Hairstylist	Nominated	
2021	Best Period and/or Character Makeup in a Television Special, One Hour or More Live Program Series or Movie for Television	Louie Zakarian; Amy Tagliamonti; Jason Milani; Rachel Pagani	Makeup Artist; Makeup Artist; Makeup Artist; Makeup Artist	Won	
2021	Best Period and/or Character Hair Styling in a Television Special, One Hour or More Live Program Series or Movie for Television	Jodi Mancuso; Cara Hannah; Inga Thrasher	Hairstylist; Hairstylist; Hairstylist	Nominated	
2022	Best Contemporary Makeup in a Television Special, One Hour or More Live Program Series or Movie for Television	Louie Zakarian; Amy Tagliamonti; Jason Milani; Rachel Paganii	Makeup Artist; Makeup Artist; Makeup Artist; Makeup Artist	Won	
2022	Best Period and/or Character Makeup in a Television Special, One Hour or More Live Program Series or Movie for Television	Louie Zakarian; Amy Tagliamonti; Jason Milani; Joanna Pisani	Makeup Artist; Makeup Artist; Makeup Artist; Makeup Artist	Won	
2022	Best Special Make-Up Effects in a Television Special, One Hour or More Live Program Series or Movie for Television	Louie Zakarian; Jason Milani; Tom Denier Jr. Lisa Forst	Makeup Artist; Makeup Artist; Makeup Artist; Makeup Artist	Won	
2023	Best Contemporary Makeup in a Television Special, One Hour or More Live Program Series or Movie for Television	Louie Zakarian; Amy Tagliamonti; Jason Milani; Young Bek	Makeup Artist; Makeup Artist; Makeup Artist; Makeup Artist	Nominated	
2023	Best Period and/or Character Makeup in a Television Special, One Hour or More Live Program Series or Movie for Television	Louie Zakarian; Amy Tagliamonti; Jason Milani; Daniela Zivcovic	Makeup Artist; Makeup Artist; Makeup Artist; Makeup Artist	Nominated	
2023	Best Special Make-Up Effects in a Television Special, One Hour or More Live Program Series or Movie for Television	Louie Zakarian; Jason Milani; Tom Denier Jr. Brandon Grether	Makeup Artist; Makeup Artist; Makeup Artist; Makeup Artist	Nominated	
2024	Best Contemporary Makeup in a Television Special, One Hour or More Live Program Series or Movie for Television	Louie Zakarian; Amy Tagliamonti; Jason Milani; Young Bek	Makeup Artist; Makeup Artist; Makeup Artist; Makeup Artist	Nominated	
2024	Best Period and/or Character Makeup in a Television Special, One Hour or More Live Program Series or Movie for Television	Louie Zakarian; Amy Tagliamonti; Jason Milani; Joanna Pisani	Makeup Artist; Makeup Artist; Makeup Artist; Makeup Artist	Won	
2024	Best Special Make-Up Effects in a Television Special, One Hour or More Live Program Series or Movie for Television	Louie Zakarian; Jason Milani; Brandon Grether; Tom Denier Jr.	Makeup Artist; Makeup Artist; Makeup Artist; Makeup Artist	Won	
2025	Best Contemporary Makeup in a Television Special, One Hour or More Live Program Series	Louie Zakarian; Amy Tagliamonti; Jason Milani; Young Bek; Daniela Zivcovic	Makeup Artist; Makeup Artist; Makeup Artist; Makeup Artist; Makeup Artist	Won	
2025	Best Period and/or Character Make-Up in a Television Special, One Hour or More Live Program Series	Louie Zakarian; Amy Tagliamonti; Jason Milani; Craig Lindberg; Rachel Pagani	Makeup Artist; Makeup Artist; Makeup Artist; Makeup Artist; Makeup Artist	Won	
2025	Best Period Hair Styling and/or Character Hair Styling in a Television Special, One Hour or More Live Program Series	Jodi Mancuso; Cara Hannah; Inga Thrasher; Joe Whitmeyer; Amanda Duffy Evans	Hairstylist; Hairstylist; Hairstylist; Hairstylist; Hairstylist	Won	
2025	Best Special Make-Up Effects in a Television Special, One Hour or More Live Program Series	Louie Zakarian; Jason Milani; Brandon Grether; Amy Tagliamonti; Tom Denier Jr.	Makeup Artist; Makeup Artist; Makeup Artist; Makeup Artist; Makeup Artist	Won	
2026	Best Contemporary Makeup in a Television Special, One Hour or More Live Program Series	Louie Zakarian; Amy Tagliamonti; Jason Milani; Young Bek; Madison Bermudez	Makeup Artist; Makeup Artist; Makeup Artist; Makeup Artist; Makeup Artist	Won	
2026	Best Period and/or Character Make-Up in a Television Special, One Hour or More Live Program Series	Louie Zakarian; Amy Tagliamonti; Jason Milani; Joanna Pisani; Kim Webe	Makeup Artist; Makeup Artist; Makeup Artist; Makeup Artist; Makeup Artist	Won	
2026	Best Period Hair Styling and/or Character Hair Styling in a Television Special, One Hour or More Live Program Series	Jodi Mancuso; Cara Hannah; Inga Thrasher; Chad Harlow; Katie Beatty	Hairstylist; Hairstylist; Hairstylist; Hairstylist; Hairstylist	Nominated	
2026	Best Period Hair Styling and/or Character Hair Styling in a Television Special, One Hour or More Live Program Series	Jodi Mancuso; Cara Hannah; Amanda Duffy Evans; Gina Ferrucci; Brittany Hartman	Hairstylist; Hairstylist; Hairstylist; Hairstylist; Hairstylist	Won	

== MTV Movie & TV Awards ==
Year	Category	Individual(s)	Result	Ref.
2018	Best Comedic Performance	Kate McKinnon	Nominated	

== NAACP Image Awards ==
Year	Category	Individual(s)	Result	Ref.
2006	Outstanding Supporting Actor in a Comedy Series	Kenan Thompson	Nominated	
2007	Outstanding Actress in a Comedy Series	Maya Rudolph	Nominated	
2018	Outstanding Variety or Game Show – (Series or Special)	Saturday Night Live	Nominated	
2018	Outstanding Supporting Actress in a Comedy Series	Leslie Jones	Nominated	
2019	Outstanding Variety Show – (Series or Special)	Saturday Night Live	Nominated	
2021	Outstanding Supporting Actor in a Comedy Series	Kenan Thompson	Nominated	
2021	Outstanding Guest Performance	Dave Chappelle	Nominated	
2021	Outstanding Guest Performance	Issa Rae	Nominated	
2021	Outstanding Guest Performance	Chris Rock	Nominated	
2022	Outstanding Supporting Actor in a Comedy Series	Kenan Thompson	Nominated	
2022	Outstanding Guest Performance	Daniel Kaluuya	Nominated	
2022	Outstanding Guest Performance	Maya Rudolph	Won	
2023	Outstanding Supporting Actor in a Comedy Series	Kenan Thompson	Nominated	
2024	Outstanding Supporting Actor in a Comedy Series	Kenan Thompson	Nominated	
2024	Outstanding Supporting Actress in a Comedy Series	Ego Nwodim	Nominated	
2024	Outstanding Guest Performance	Michael B. Jordan	Won	
2025	Outstanding Variety Show (Series or Special)	Saturday Night Live	Nominated	
2025	Outstanding Supporting Actor in a Comedy Series	Kenan Thompson	Nominated	
2025	Outstanding Supporting Actress in a Comedy Series	Ego Nwodim	Nominated	
2025	Outstanding Guest Performance	Ayo Edebiri	Nominated	
2025	Outstanding Guest Performance	Maya Rudolph	Nominated	
2026	Outstanding Supporting Actress in a Comedy Series	Ego Nwodim	Nominated	
2026	Outstanding Guest Performance	Dave Chappelle	Nominated	

== Ottawa International Animation Festival ==
Year	Category	Episode	Individual(s)	Position	Result	Ref.
2004	Best Television Special	544 (28.19)	David Wachtenheim; Robert Marianetti	Animator; Animator	Won	
2004	Mike Gribble Peel of Laughter Award	544 (28.19)	David Wachtenheim; Robert Marianetti	Animator; Animator	Won	
2006	Television Animation for Adults	602 (31.17)	David Wachtenheim; Robert Marianetti; Glen Steinmacher	Animator; Animator; Animator	Won	

== Peabody Awards ==
Year	Category	Recipient(s)	Result	Ref.
1990	—N/a	NBC	Won	
2008	—N/a	SNL Studios in association with Broadway Video	Won	
2017	Entertainment	SNL Studios in association with Universal Television and Broadway Video	Won	
2024	Institutional Award	Award for the show's 50 years of being "at the forefront of topical comedy"	Won	

== People's Choice Awards ==
Year	Category	Individual(s)	Result	Ref.
2015	Favorite Sketch Comedy TV Show	Saturday Night Live	Won	
2017	Favorite Comedic Collaboration	Alec Baldwin; Kate McKinnon	Nominated	
2019	Favorite Comedy Show	Saturday Night Live	Nominated	
2019	Favorite Comedy TV Star	Leslie Jones	Nominated	
2020	Favorite Comedy TV Star	Kate McKinnon	Nominated	
2021	Favorite Show	Saturday Night Live	Nominated	
2021	Favorite Comedy Show	Saturday Night Live	Nominated	
2021	Favorite Male TV Star	Kenan Thompson	Nominated	
2021	Favorite Comedy TV Star	Kenan Thompson	Nominated	
2022	Favorite Show	Saturday Night Live	Nominated	
2022	Favorite Comedy Show	Saturday Night Live	Nominated	
2022	Favorite Comedy TV Star	Kenan Thompson	Nominated	
2022	Favorite Comedy TV Star	Bowen Yang	Nominated	
2024	Show of the Year	Saturday Night Live	Nominated	
2024	Comedy Show of the Year	Saturday Night Live	Nominated	
2024	Comedy TV Star of the Year	Bowen Yang	Nominated	

== Poppy Awards ==
Year	Category	Individual(s)	Result	Ref.
2008	Best Supporting Actress, Comedy	Kristen Wiig	Nominated	
2011	Best Supporting Actor, Comedy	Bill Hader	Nominated	
2013	Best Supporting Actor, Comedy	Taran Killam	Nominated	
2013	Best Supporting Actress, Comedy	Kate McKinnon	Nominated	
2014	Best Supporting Actress, Comedy	Aidy Bryant	Nominated	
2014	Best Guest Actor, Comedy	Drake	Nominated	
2014	Best Guest Actress, Comedy	Kerry Washington	Nominated	
2015	Best Supporting Actress, Comedy	Aidy Bryant	Won	

== Primetime Emmy Awards ==
=== Outstanding Costumes for a Variety, Nonfiction or Reality Programming ===
Year	Episode(s)	Individual(s)	Position	Result	Ref.
1999	454 (24.8)	Tom Broecker	Costume Designer	Nominated	
2000	481 (25.16)	Tom Broecker; Eric Justian	Costume Designer; Assistant Costume Designer	Nominated	
2001	504 (26.19)	Tom Broecker; Eric Justian	Costume Designer; Assistant Costume Designer	Nominated	
2002	520 (27.15)	Tom Broecker; Eric Justian	Costume Designer; Assistant Costume Designer	Nominated	
2003	532 (28.07)	Tom Broecker; Eric Justian	Costume Designer; Assistant Costume Designer	Nominated	
2014	755 (39.10)	Tom Broecker; Eric Justian	Costume Designer; Assistant Costume Designer	Won	
2016	794 (41.07)	Tom Broecker; Eric Justian	Costume Designer; Costume Designer	Nominated	
2017	811 (42.03)	Tom Broecker; Eric Justian	Costume Designer; Costume Designer	Nominated	
2018	842 (43.13)	Tom Broecker; Eric Justian	Costume Designer; Costume Designer	Nominated	
2019	866 (44.16)	Tom Broecker; Eric Justian; Cristina Natividad; Karena Sanchez; Ashley Dudek	Costume Designer; Costume Designer; Assistant Costume Designer; Assistant Costume Designer; Assistant Costume Designer	Nominated	
2020	881 (45.10)	Tom Broecker; Eric Justian; Cristina Natividad; Ashley Dudek; Karena Sanchez; Dale Richards	Costume Designer; Costume Designer; Assistant Costume Designer; Assistant Costume Designer; Assistant Costume Designer; Costume Supervisor	Nominated	

=== Outstanding Directing for a Documentary/Nonfiction Program ===
Year	Title	Individual(s)	Position	Result	Ref.
2025	Ladies & Gentlemen... 50 Years of SNL Music	Ahmir "Questlove" Thompson; Oz Rodriguez	Director; Director	Nominated	

=== Outstanding Directing for a Variety Series ===
Year	Episode(s)	Individual(s)	Position	Result	Ref.
1976	2 (1.2)	Dave Wilson	Director	Won	
1977	32 (2.8)	Dave Wilson	Director	Nominated	
1978	47 (3.1)	Dave Wilson	Director	Nominated	
1994	—N/a	Dave Wilson	Director	Nominated	
1999	450 (24.4)	Beth McCarthy-Miller	Director	Nominated	
2000	Saturday Night Live; 25th Anniversary Special	Beth McCarthy-Miller	Director	Nominated	
2003	538 (28.13)	Beth McCarthy-Miller	Director	Nominated	
2006	597 (31.12)	Beth McCarthy-Miller	Director	Nominated	
2007	609 (32.5)	Don Roy King	Director	Nominated	
2008	629 (33.5)	Don Roy King	Director	Nominated	
2009	657 (34.21)	Don Roy King	Director	Nominated	
2010	679 (35.21)	Don Roy King	Director	Won	
2011	702 (36.22)	Don Roy King	Director	Won	
2012	724 (37.22)	Don Roy King	Director	Won	
2013	740 (38.16)	Don Roy King	Director	Won	
2014	755 (39.10)	Don Roy King	Director	Won	
2016	796 (41.09)	Don Roy King	Director	Nominated	
2017	826 (42.18)	Don Roy King	Director	Won	
2018	848 (43.19)	Don Roy King	Director	Won	
2019	869 (44.19)	Don Roy King	Director	Won	
2020	881 (45.10)	Don Roy King	Director	Won	
2021	895 (46.06)	Don Roy King	Director	Won	
2022	917 (47.08)	Don Roy King & Liz Patrick	Director	Nominated	
2023	938 (48.08)	Liz Patrick	Director	Won	
2024	965 (49.17)	Liz Patrick	Director	Won	
2026	1006 (51.18)	Liz Patrick	Director	Nominated	

=== Outstanding Directing for a Variety Special ===
Year	Title	Individual(s)	Position	Result	Ref.
2015	Saturday Night Live 40th Anniversary Special	Don Roy King	Director	Won	
2025	Saturday Night Live 50th Anniversary Special	Liz Patrick	Director	Won	
2025	SNL50: The Homecoming Concert	Beth McCarthy-Miller	Director	Nominated	

=== Outstanding Documentary or Nonfiction Series ===
Year	Title	Individual(s)	Position	Result	Ref.
2025	SNL50: Beyond Saturday Night	Morgan Neville; Caitrin Rogers; Juaquin Cambron; Nora Chute; Darling Higgins; Zach Greenspan; Jonathan Formica; Allison Klein	Executive Producer; Executive Producer; Executive Producer; Supervising Producer; Line Producer; Line Producer; Producer; Producer	Nominated	

=== Outstanding Documentary or Nonfiction Special ===
Year	Title	Individual(s)	Position	Result	Ref.
2005	Live from New York: The First Five Years of Saturday Night Live	Ken Aymong; Rachel Talbot; Ken Bowser	Supervising Producer; Supervising Producer; Producer	Nominated	
2010	Saturday Night Live in the 2000s: Time and Again	Ken Aymong; Ken Bowser; Declan Baldwin	Supervising Producer; Producer; Producer	Nominated	

=== Outstanding Emerging Media Program ===
Year	Title	Individual(s)	Position	Result	Ref.
2009	The Saturday Night Live Digital Experience	NBC.com		Nominated	
2015	Saturday Night Live: SNL40	NBC Entertainment and Broadway Video		Nominated	
2016	Saturday Night Live Interactive Experience	NBC Entertainment		Nominated	
2017	Saturday Night Live Multiplatform Experience	NBC		Nominated	
2018	Saturday Night Live	NBC		Nominated	
2025	SNL 50th The Anniversary Special: Immersive Experience	Lorne Michaels; Michael DeProspo; Michael Scogin; Rick Rey; Matthew Celia	Executive Producer; Producer; Producer; Producer; Director	Won	

=== Outstanding Guest Actor in a Comedy Series ===
Year	Episode(s)	Individual(s)	Role	Result	Ref.
2009	657 (34.21)	Justin Timberlake	Various Roles	Won	
2011	699 (36.17)	Zach Galifianakis	Various Roles	Nominated	
2011	702 (36.22)	Justin Timberlake	Various Roles	Won	
2012	712 (37.10)	Jimmy Fallon	Various Roles	Won	
2013	730 (38.06)	Louis C.K.	Various Roles	Nominated	
2013	740 (38.16)	Justin Timberlake	Various Roles	Nominated	
2014	755 (39.10)	Jimmy Fallon	Various Roles	Won	
2014	761 (39.16)	Louis C.K.	Various Roles	Nominated	
2015	769 (40.03)	Bill Hader	Various Roles	Nominated	
2015	787 (40.21)	Louis C.K.	Various Roles	Nominated	
2016	790 (41.03)	Tracy Morgan	Various Roles	Nominated	
2016	799 (41.12)	Larry David	Various Roles	Nominated	
2017	814 (42.06)	Dave Chappelle	Various Roles	Won	
2017	812 (42.04)	Tom Hanks	Various Roles	Nominated	
2017	810 (42.02)	Lin-Manuel Miranda	Various Roles	Nominated	
2018	848 (43.19)	Donald Glover	Various Roles	Nominated	
2018	845 (43.16)	Bill Hader	Various Roles	Nominated	
2019	859 (44.09)	Matt Damon	Various Roles	Nominated	
2019	866 (44.16)	Robert De Niro	Robert Mueller	Nominated	
2019	864 (44.14)	John Mulaney	Various Roles	Nominated	
2019	869 (44.19)	Adam Sandler	Various Roles	Nominated	
2020	882 (45.11)	Adam Driver	Various Roles	Nominated	
2020	881 (45.10)	Eddie Murphy	Various Roles	Won	
2020	SNL at Home #2 (45.17)	Brad Pitt	Anthony Fauci	Nominated	
2021	895 (46.06)	Alec Baldwin	Donald Trump	Nominated	
2021	895 (46.06)	Dave Chappelle	Various Roles	Won	
2021	907 (46.16)	Daniel Kaluuya	Various Roles	Nominated	
2021	905 (46.11)	Dan Levy	Various Roles	Nominated	
2022	925 (47.16)	Jerrod Carmichael	Various Roles	Nominated	
2023	942 (48.12)	Pedro Pascal	Various Roles	Nominated	
2024	965 (49.17)	Ryan Gosling	Various Roles	Nominated	
2026	1001 (51.13)	Connor Storrie	Various Roles	Nominated	

=== Outstanding Guest Actress in a Comedy Series ===
Year	Episode(s)	Individual(s)	Role	Result	Ref.
2009	Presidential Bash 2008	Tina Fey	Sarah Palin	Won	
2010	676 (35.18)	Tina Fey	Various Roles	Nominated	
2010	679 (35.21)	Betty White	Various Roles	Won	
2011	700 (36.20)	Tina Fey	Various Roles	Nominated	
2012	704 (37.02)	Melissa McCarthy	Various Roles	Nominated	
2012	717 (37.15)	Maya Rudolph	Various Roles	Nominated	
2013	741 (38.17)	Melissa McCarthy	Various Roles	Nominated	
2013	744 (38.20)	Kristen Wiig	Various Roles	Nominated	
2014	746 (39.01)	Tina Fey	Various Roles	Nominated	
2014	758 (39.13)	Melissa McCarthy	Various Roles	Nominated	
2016	796 (41.09)	Tina Fey & Amy Poehler	Various Roles	Won	
2016	800 (41.13)	Melissa McCarthy	Various Roles	Nominated	
2016	789 (41.02)	Amy Schumer	Various Roles	Nominated	
2017	828 (42.20)	Melissa McCarthy	Various Roles	Won	
2017	815 (42.07)	Kristen Wiig	Various Roles	Nominated	
2018	850 (43.21)	Tina Fey	Various Roles	Nominated	
2018	834 (43.05)	Tiffany Haddish	Various Roles	Won	
2019	866 (44.16)	Sandra Oh	Various Roles	Nominated	
2019	870 (44.20)	Emma Thompson	Various Roles	Nominated	
2020	881 (45.10)	Maya Rudolph	Kamala Harris	Won	
2020	873 (45.02)	Phoebe Waller-Bridge	Various Roles	Nominated	
2021	904 (46.15)	Maya Rudolph	Various Roles	Won	
2021	898 (46.09)	Kristen Wiig	Various Roles	Nominated	
2023	946 (48.16)	Quinta Brunson	Various Roles	Nominated	
2024	967 (49.19)	Maya Rudolph	Various Roles	Nominated	
2024	964 (49.16)	Kristen Wiig	Various Roles	Nominated	

=== Outstanding Hairstyling for a Variety, Nonfiction or Reality Program ===
Year	Episode(s)	Individual(s)	Position	Result	Ref.
1997	391 (21.5)	Valerie Gladstone-Appel; Wanda Gregory; David H. Lawrence; Linda Rice	Hairstylist; Hairstylist; Hairstylist; Hairstylist	Nominated	
1999	458 (24.12)	Bobby H. Grayson	Hairstylist	Nominated	
2000	476 (25.11)	Bobby H. Grayson	Hairstylist	Won	
2004	555 (29.10)	Michael Anthony; Clariss Morgan; Linda Rice	Hairstylist; Hairstylist; Hairstylist	Nominated	
2008	629 (33.5)	Bettie O. Rogers; Anne Michelle Radcliffe; Jodi Mancuso	Department Head Stylist; Key Hairstylist; Additional Hairstylist	Won	
2009	641 (34.5)	Bettie O. Rogers; Jodi Mancuso; Inga Thrasher	Department Head Stylist; Key Hairstylist; Additional Hairstylist	Nominated	
2010	679 (35.21)	Bettie O. Rogers; Jodi Mancuso; Jennifer Serio Stauffer; Inga Thrasher; Cara Sullivan; Christal Schanes	Department Head Hairstylist; Key Hairstylist; Additional Hairstylist; Additional Hairstylist; Additional Hairstylist; Additional Hairstylist	Nominated	
2011	689 (36.7)	Bettie O. Rogers; Jodi Mancuso; Jennifer Serio Stauffer; Inga Thrasher; Christal Schanes	Department Head Hairstylist; Key Hairstylist; Additional Hairstylist; Additional Hairstylist; Additional Hairstylist	Nominated	
2012	716 (37.14)	Bettie O. Rogers; Jodi Mancuso; Jennifer Serio Stauffer; Inga Thrasher; Christal Schanes; Hannah Sullivan	Department Head Hairstylist; Key Hairstylist; Hairstylist; Hairstylist; Hairstylist; Hairstylist	Won	
2013	735 (38.11)	Bettie O. Rogers; Jodi Mancuso; Jennifer Serio Stauffer; Inga Thrasher; Cara Hannah Sullivan	—N/a	Won	
2014	762 (39.17)	Bettie O. Rogers; Jodi Mancuso; Jennifer Serio Stauffer; Inga Thrasher; Cara Hannah Sullivan; Joe Whitmeyer	Department Head Hairstylist; Key Hairstylist; Hairstylist; Hairstylist; Hairstylist; Hairstylist	Won	
2015	775 (40.09)	Bettie O. Rogers; Jodi Mancuso; Jennifer Serio Stauffer; Inga Thrasher; Cara Hannah Sullivan; Joe Whitmeyer	Department Head Hairstylist; Key Hairstylist; Hairstylist; Hairstylist; Hairstylist; Hairstylist	Won	
2016	808 (41.21)	Bettie O. Rogers; Jodi Mancuso; Jennifer Serio Stauffer; Inga Thrasher; Cara Hannah Sullivan; Joe Whitmeyer	Department Head Hairstylist; Key Hairstylist; Hairstylist; Hairstylist; Hairstylist; Hairstylist	Won	
2017	829 (42.21)	Jodi Mancuso; Jennifer Serio; Inga Thrasher; Joe Whitmeyer; Cara Hannah Sullivan; Christen Edwards	Department Head Hairstylist; Key Hairstylist; Hairstylist; Hairstylist; Hairstylist; Hairstylist	Nominated	
2018	834 (43.05)	Jodi Mancuso; Jennifer Serio; Inga Thrasher; Joe Whitmeyer; Cara Hannah Sullivan; Amanda Duffy	Department Head Hairstylist; Key Hairstylist; Hairstylist; Hairstylist; Hairstylist; Hairstylist	Nominated	
2019	869 (44.19)	Jodi Mancuso; Cara Hannah Sullivan; Inga Thrasher; Gina Farruca; Joseph C. Whitmeyer; Amanda Duffy Evans	Department Head Hairstylist; Key Hairstylist; Hairstylist; Hairstylist; Hairstylist; Hairstylist	Nominated	
2021	904 (46.15)	Jodi Mancuso; Cara Hannah; Inga Thrasher; Gina Farruca; Joseph C. Whitmeyer; Amanda Duffy Evans	Department Head Hairstylist; Key Hairstylist; Hairstylist; Hairstylist; Hairstylist; Hairstylist	Won	
2024	965 (49.17)	Jodi Mancuso; Cara Hannah; Inga Thrasher; Joseph Whitmeyer; Amanda Duffy Evans; Chad Harlow; Gina Ferrucci; Elliott Simpson	Department Head Hairstylist; Key Hairstylist; Hairstylist; Hairstylist; Hairstylist; Hairstylist; Hairstylist; Hairstylist	Won	
2025	Saturday Night Live; 50th Anniversary Special	Jodi Mancuso; Cara Hannah; Inga Thrasher; Amanda Duffy Evans; Chad Harlow; Gina Ferrucci; Brittany Hartman; Katie Beatty	Department Head Hairstylist; Key Hairstylist; Hairstylist; Hairstylist; Hairstylist; Hairstylist; Hairstylist; Hairstylist	Won	
2026	994 (51.06)	Jodi Mancuso; Cara Hannah; Inga Thrasher; Amanda Duffy Evans; Chad Harlow; Gina Ferrucci; Jennifer Serio; Katie Beatty	Department Head Hairstylist; Key Hairstylist; Hairstylist; Hairstylist; Hairstylist; Hairstylist; Hairstylist; Hairstylist	Nominated	

=== Outstanding Individual Performance in a Variety or Music Program ===
Year	Episode(s)	Individual(s)	Position	Result	Ref.
1976	10 (1.10)	Chevy Chase	Performer	Won	
1977	34 (2.10)	John Belushi	Performer	Nominated	
1977	38 (2.15)	Gilda Radner	Performer	Nominated	
1977	43 (2.20)	Chevy Chase	Performer	Nominated	
1978	—N/a	Dan Aykroyd	Performer	Nominated	
1978	—N/a	John Belushi	Performer	Nominated	
1978	—N/a	Jane Curtin	Performer	Nominated	
1978	—N/a	Gilda Radner	Performer	Won	
1983	—N/a	Eddie Murphy	Performer	Nominated	
1984	—N/a	Eddie Murphy	Performer	Nominated	
1984	—N/a	Joe Piscopo	Performer	Nominated	
1985	—N/a	Billy Crystal	Performer	Nominated	
1986	—N/a	Jon Lovitz	Performer	Nominated	
1987	—N/a	Jon Lovitz	Performer	Nominated	
1989	261 (14.16)	Dana Carvey	Performer	Nominated	
1990	276 (15.10)	Dana Carvey	Performer	Nominated	
1991	293 (16.7)	Dana Carvey	Performer	Nominated	
1992	309 (17.3)	Dana Carvey	Performer	Nominated	
1993	—N/a	Dana Carvey	Performer	Won	
1994	—N/a	Phil Hartman	Performer	Nominated	
1994	—N/a	Mike Myers	Performer	Nominated	
2000	—N/a	Molly Shannon	Performer	Nominated	
2001	—N/a	Will Ferrell	Performer	Nominated	
2008	—N/a	Tina Fey	Host/Performer	Nominated	

=== Outstanding Lighting Design / Lighting Direction for a Variety Series ===
Year	Episode(s)	Individual(s)	Position	Result	Ref.
2009	647 (34.11)	Geoff Amoral; Rick McGuinness	Lighting Director; Lighting Director	Nominated	
2010	679 (35.21)	Geoff Amoral; Rick McGuinness; Phil Hymes	Lighting Director; Lighting Director; Lighting Designer	Nominated	
2011	702 (36.22)	Geoff Amoral; Rick McGuinness; Phil Hymes	Lighting Director; Lighting Director; Lighting Designer	Nominated	
2012	712 (37.10)	Geoff Amoral; Rick McGuinness; Phil Hymes	Lighting Director; Lighting Director; Lighting Designer	Nominated	
2013	734 (38.10)	Geoff Amoral; Rick McGuinness; Phil Hymes	Lighting Director; Lighting Director; Lighting Designer	Nominated	
2014	755 (39.10)	Geoff Amoral; Rick McGuinness; Phil Hymes	Lighting Director; Lighting Director; Lighting Designer	Nominated	
2015	776 (40.10)	Geoff Amoral; Rick McGuinness; Phil Hymes	Lighting Director; Lighting Director; Lighting Designer	Nominated	
2016	796 (41.9)	Geoff Amoral; Rick McGuinness; Phil Hymes	Lighting Director; Lighting Director; Lighting Designer	Nominated	
2017	826 (42.18)	Geoff Amoral; Rick McGuinness; Phil Hymes	Lighting Director; Lighting Director; Lighting Designer	Nominated	
2018	838 (43.09)	Geoff Amoral; Rick McGuinness; Phil Hymes	Lighting Director; Lighting Director; Lighting Designer	Won	
2019	864 (44.14)	Richard McGuinness; Geoffrey Amoral; William McGuinness; Trevor Brown; Tim Stasse	Lighting Director; Lighting Director; Lighting Director; Lighting Director; Lighting Director	Won	
2020	885 (45.14)	Geoffrey Amoral; Richard McGuinness; William McGuinness; Tim Stasse; Trevor Brown	Lighting Director; Lighting Director; Lighting Director; Lighting Director; Lighting Director	Won	
2021	893 (46.04)	Geoffrey Amoral; Richard McGuinness; William McGuinness; Tim Stasse; Trevor Brown	Lighting Director; Lighting Director; Lighting Director; Lighting Director; Lighting Director	Won	
2024	964 (49.16)	Geoffrey Amoral; Rick McGuinness; Trevor Brown; Tim Stasse; William McGuinness; Frank Grisanti	Lighting Director; Lighting Director; Moving Light Programmer; Moving Light Programmer; Chief Lighting Technician; Video Control	Won	
2025	982 (50.14)	Geoffrey Amoral; Rick McGuinness; William McGuinness; Trevor Brown; Tim Stasse; Frank Grisanti; Reginald Campbell	Lighting Director; Lighting Director; Chief Lighting Technician; Moving Light Programmer; Moving Light Programmer; Video Controller; Video Controller	Won	
2026	997 (51.09)	Geoffrey Amoral; Rick McGuinness; William McGuinness; Trevor Brown; Tim Stasse; Frank Grisanti; Reginald Campbell	Lighting Director; Lighting Director; Chief Lighting Technician; Moving Light Programmer; Moving Light Programmer; Video Controller; Video Controller	Nominated	

=== Outstanding Lighting Design / Lighting Direction for a Variety Special ===
Year	Title	Individual(s)	Position	Result	Ref.
2015	Saturday Night Live; 40th Anniversary Special	Geoff Amoral; Rick McGuinness; Phil Hymes	Lighting Director; Lighting Director; Lighting Designer	Nominated	
2025	Saturday Night Live; 50th Anniversary Special	Geoffrey Amoral; Rick McGuinness; William McGuinness; Trevor Brown; Tim Stasse; Frank Grisanti; Reginald Campbell	Lighting Director; Lighting Director; Chief Lighting Technician; Moving Light Programmer; Moving Light Programmer; Video Controller; Video Controller	Nominated	
2025	SNL50: The Homecoming Concert	Tom Sutherland; Harry Forster; Hunter Selby; Bobby Grey; Ryan Tanker; Chris Roseli; Matt Cotter; JM Hurley; Bob Benedetti	Lighting Designer; Lighting Director; Lighting Director; Moving Light Programmer; Moving Light Programmer; Gaffer; Media Server Programmer; Video Controller; Video Controller	Nominated	

=== Outstanding Makeup for a Variety, Nonfiction or Reality Program ===
Year	Episode(s)	Individual(s)	Position	Result	Ref.
1993	337 (18.11)	Jennifer Aspinall	Makeup Department Head	Nominated	
1994	818 (19.18)	Margot Boccia; Norman Bryn; John Caglione; Courtney Carell; Linda Castillo; Jack Engel; Linda Grimes; Robin Gurin; Roosevelt Madison; Peter Montagna; Nina Port; Kay Rowland; Michael Thomas	Makeup Artist; Makeup Artist; Makeup Artist; Makeup Artist; Makeup Artist; Makeup Artist; Makeup Artist; Makeup Artist; Makeup Artist; Makeup Artist; Makeup Artist; Makeup Artist; Makeup Artist	Nominated	
1999	459 (24.13)	Vincent Guastini; Andrea Miller; Louie Zakarian	Makeup Artist; Makeup Artist; Makeup Artist	Nominated	
2009	641 (34.5)	Louie Zakarian; Amy Tagliamonti; Josh Turi	Department Head Makeup Artist; Makeup Artist; Makeup Artist	Nominated	
2010	679 (35.21)	Louie Zakarian; Amy Tagliamonti; Josh Turi	Department Head Makeup Artist; Makeup Artist; Makeup Artist	Won	
2011	687 (36.5)	Louie Zakarian; Josh Turi; Amy Tagliamonti; Daniela Zivkovic; Katherine O'Donnell	Department Head Makeup Artist; Makeup Artist; Makeup Artist; Makeup Artist; Makeup Artist	Won	
2012	711 (37.9)	Louie Zakarian; Josh Turi; Amy Tagliamonti; Daniela Zivkovic; Tom Denier Jr.	Department Head Makeup Artist; Makeup Artist; Makeup Artist; Makeup Artist; Makeup Artist	Nominated	
2013	740 (38.16)	Louie Zakarian; Josh Turi; Amy Tagliamonti; Daniela Zivkovic; Melanie Demitri	Department Head Makeup Artist; Makeup Artist; Makeup Artist; Makeup Artist; Makeup Artist	Won	
2014	755 (39.10)	Louie Zakarian; Amy Tagliamonti; Sarah Egan; Daniela Zivkovic; Melanie Demitri	Department Head Makeup Artist; Makeup Artist; Makeup Artist; Makeup Artist; Makeup Artist	Won	
2015	Saturday Night Live; 40th Anniversary Special	Louie Zakarian; Amy Tagliamonti; Jason Milani; Sarah Egan; Daniela Zivkovic; Melanie Demitri	Department Head Makeup Artist; Makeup Artist; Makeup Artist; Makeup Artist; Makeup Artist; Makeup Artist	Won	
2016	794 (41.7)	Louie Zakarian; Amy Tagliamonti; Jason Milani; Daniela Zivkovic; Melanie Demitri; Margie Durand	Department Head Makeup Artist; Key Makeup Artist; Key Makeup Artist; Makeup Artist; Makeup Artist; Makeup Artist	Nominated	
2017	822 (42.14)	Louie Zakarian; Amy Tagliamonti; Jason Milani; Daniela Zivkovic; Rachel Pagani; Andrew Sotomayor	Department Head Makeup Artist; Key Makeup Artist; Key Makeup Artist; Makeup Artist; Makeup Artist; Makeup Artist	Won	
2018	850 (43.21)	Louie Zakarian; Amy Tagliamonti; Jason Milani; Daniela Zivkovic; Rachel Pagani; Sarah Egan	Department Head Makeup Artist; Key Makeup Artist; Key Makeup Artist; Makeup Artist; Makeup Artist; Makeup Artist	Won	
2019	869 (44.19)	Louie Zakarian; Amy Tagliamonti; Jason Milani; Rachel Pagani; Sarah Egan; Young Beck	Department Head Makeup Artist; Key Makeup Artist; Key Makeup Artist; Additional Makeup Artist; Makeup Artist; Makeup Artist	Won	
2021	907 (46.18)	Louie Zakarian; Amy Tagliamonti; Jason Milani; Joanna Pisani; Young Beck; Chris Milone; Kim Weber	Department Head Makeup Artist; Key Makeup Artist; Key Makeup Artist; Key Makeup Artist; Key Makeup Artist; Makeup Artist; Makeup Artist	Won	
2024	965 (49.17)	Louie Zakarian; Jason Milani; Amy Tagliamonti; Rachel Pagani; Young Beck; Brandon Grether; Joanna Pisani	Department Head Makeup Artist; Key Makeup Artist; Key Makeup Artist; Makeup Artist; Makeup Artist; Makeup Artist; Makeup Artist	Won	
2025	Saturday Night Live; 50th Anniversary Special	Louie Zakarian; Jason Milani; Amy Tagliamonti; Rachel Pagani; Young Beck; Stephen Kelley; Joanna Pisani	Department Head Makeup Artist; Key Makeup Artist; Key Makeup Artist; Makeup Artist; Makeup Artist; Makeup Artist; Makeup Artist	Won	
2026	989 (51.01)	Louie Zakarian; Jason Milani; Amy Tagliamonti; Young Beck; Joanna Pisani; Madison Bermudez; Waltaya Culmer	Department Head Makeup Artist; Key Makeup Artist; Key Makeup Artist; Makeup Artist; Makeup Artist; Makeup Artist; Makeup Artist	Won	

=== Outstanding Music Direction ===
Year	Episode(s)	Individual(s)	Position	Result	Ref.
2019	869 (44.19)	Lenny Pickett; Leon Pendarvis; Eli Brueggemann	Music Director; Music Director; Music Director	Nominated	
2020	SNL at Home #1 (45.16)	Lenny Pickett; Eli Brueggemann; Leon Pendarvis	Music Director; Music Director; Music Director	Nominated	
2022	926 (47.17)	Lenny Pickett; Leon Pendarvis; Eli Brueggemann	Music Director; Music Director; Music Director	Nominated	
2023	939 (48.09)	Lenny Pickett; Leon Pendarvis; Eli Brueggemann	Music Director; Music Director; Music Director	Nominated	
2024	965 (49.17)	Lenny Pickett; Leon Pendarvis; Eli Brueggemann	Music Director; Music Director; Music Director	Nominated	
2025	Saturday Night Live; 50th Anniversary Special	Lenny Pickett; Leon Pendarvis; Eli Brueggemann	Music Director; Music Director; Music Director	Nominated	
2025	SNL50: The Homecoming Concert	James Poyser; Ahmir "Questlove" Thompson	Music Director; Music Director	Nominated	
2026	1004 (51.16)	Lenny Pickett; Leon Pendarvis; Eli Brueggemann; Maddie Rice	Music Director; Music Director; Music Director; Music Director	Nominated	

=== Outstanding Original Music and Lyrics ===
Year	Episode(s)	Song title	Music by	Lyrics by	Result	Ref.
2007	613 (32.9)	"Dick in a Box"	Justin Timberlake; Jorma Taccone; Katreese Barnes; Asa Taccone	Justin Timberlake; Jorma Taccone; Akiva Schaffer; Andy Samberg	Won	
2009	657 (34.21)	"Motherlover"	Asa Taccone; Drew Campbell	Akiva Schaffer; Jorma Taccone; Andy Samberg; Justin Timberlake	Nominated	
2010	666 (35.8)	"Shy Ronnie"	Aleric Banks	Andy Samberg; Akiva Schaffer; Jorma Taccone	Nominated	
2011	692 (36.10)	"I Just Had Sex"	Justin Franks; Jerrod Bettis	Akiva Schaffer; Jorma Taccone; Andy Samberg	Nominated	
2011	700 (36.20)	"Jack Sparrow"	Michael Woods	Akiva Schaffer; Jorma Taccone; Andy Samberg	Nominated	
2011	702 (36.22)	"Justin Timberlake Monologue"	Katreese Barnes	Seth Meyers; John Mulaney; Justin Timberlake	Won	
2011	702 (36.22)	"3-Way (The Golden Rule)"	Akiva Schaffer; Jorma Taccone; Andy Samberg; Justin Timberlake		Nominated	
2012	709 (37.07)	"I Can't Believe I'm Hosting"	Eli Brueggemann	Seth Meyers; John Mulaney	Nominated	
2014	755 (39.10)	"Home for the Holiday (Twin Bed)"	Eli Brueggemann	Chris Kelly; Sarah Schneider; Aidy Bryant; Kate McKinnon	Nominated	
2017	818 (42.10)	"Last Christmas"	Eli Brueggemann	Chancelor Johnathan Bennett; Kenan Thompson; Will Stephen	Nominated	
2018	835 (43.06)	"Come Back Barack"	Eli Brueggemann	Chris Redd; Will Stephen; Kenan Thompson	Won	
2019	861 (44.11)	"The Upper East Side"	Eli Brueggemann	Bryan Tucker; Leslie Jones	Nominated	
2024	967 (49.19)	"Maya Rudolph Mother's Day Monologue"	Eli Brueggemann	Maya Rudolph; Auguste White; Mike DiCenzo; Jake Nordwind	Nominated	
2025	Saturday Night Live; 50th Anniversary Special	"Adam Sandler's Song: 50 Years"	Adam Sandler; Dan Bulla		Nominated	

=== Outstanding Picture Editing for a Nonfiction Program ===
Year	Title	Individual(s)	Position	Result	Ref.
2025	Ladies & Gentlemen... 50 Years of SNL Music	James Lester; Oz Rodriguez; F. Michael Young	Editor; Editor; Additional Editor	Nominated	
2025	"More Cowbell"	Cori Wapnowska	Editor	Nominated	

=== Outstanding Picture Editing for Variety Programming ===
Year	Segment(s)	Individual(s)	Position	Result	Ref.
2013	"Lincoln"	Adam Epstein	Editor	Nominated	
2017	"Kellyanne Conway"	Adam Epstein	Editor	Nominated	
2021	"Murder Show"	Ryan Spears	Editor	Nominated	
2021	"Stu"	Ryan McIlraith	Editor	Nominated	
2023	"HBO Mario Kart Trailer"	Ryan Spears; Christopher Salerno	Editor; Editor	Nominated	
2024	"Bowen's Straight"	Paul Del Gesso; Kristie Ferriso	Editor; Editor	Nominated	
2024	"I'm Just Pete"	Ryan Spears	Editor	Nominated	
2025	"Physical Comedy"	Ryan Spears; Paul Del Gesso; Christopher Salerno; Daniel Garcia; Sean McIlraith; Ryan McIlraith	Film Unit Editor; Film Unit Editor; Film Unit Editor; Editor; Editor; Editor	Won	
2026	"Home Alone"	Ryan Spears	Editor	Nominated	
2026	"MAHAspital (The New Pitt)"	Christopher Salerno; Mak Makower	Editor; Editor	Nominated	

=== Outstanding Production Design for a Variety or Reality Series ===
Year	Episode(s)	Individual(s)	Position	Result	Ref.
1977	39 (2.16)	Eugene Lee; Leo 'Akira' Yoshimura; Franne Lee	Art Director; Art Director; Production Designer	Nominated	
1978	47 (3.1)	Eugene Lee; Franne Lee; Lee Mayman; Leo 'Akira' Yoshimura	Art Director; Production Designer; Production Designer; Art Director	Nominated	
2000	Saturday Night Live; 25th Anniversary Special	Eugene Lee; Leo 'Akira' Yoshimura; Keith Ian Raywood; N. Joseph DeTullio	Production Designer; Production Designer; Production Designer; Art Director	Nominated	
2004	553 (29.8)	Eugene Lee; Leo 'Akira' Yoshimura; Keith Ian Raywood; N. Joseph DeTullio	Production Designer; Production Designer; Production Designer; Art Director	Nominated	
2009	640 (34.4) and 647 (34.11)	Eugene Lee; Leo 'Akira' Yoshimura; Keith Ian Raywood; N. Joseph DeTullio	Production Designer; Production Designer; Production Designer; Art Director	Nominated	
2010	668 (35.10), 671 (35.13), and 679 (35.21)	Joe DeTullio; Leo 'Akira' Yoshimura; Eugene Lee; Keith Raywood	Production Designer; Production Designer; Production Designer; Production Designer	Nominated	
2011	695 (36.15)	Joe DeTullio; Leo 'Akira' Yoshimura; Eugene Lee; Keith Raywood	Production Designer; Production Designer; Production Designer; Production Designer	Nominated	
2012	712 (37.10)	Leo 'Akira' Yoshimura; Eugene Lee; Keith Raywood	Production Designer; Production Designer; Production Designer	Nominated	
2013	734 (38.10), 740 (38.16) and 745 (38.21)	Leo 'Akira' Yoshimura; Eugene Lee; Keith Raywood	Production Designer; Production Designer; Production Designer	Won	
2014	755 (39.10)	Leo 'Akira' Yoshimura; Eugene Lee; Keith Raywood; N. Joseph DeTullio	Production Designer; Production Designer; Production Designer; Production Designer	Nominated	
2016	796 (41.09), 799 (41.12), and 803 (41.16)	Leo 'Akira' Yoshimura; Eugene Lee; Keith Raywood; N. Joseph DeTullio	Production Designer; Production Designer; Production Designer; Production Designer	Nominated	
2017	822 (42.14)	Leo 'Akira' Yoshimura; Eugene Lee; Keith Raywood; N. Joseph DeTullio	Production Designer; Production Designer; Production Designer; Production Designer	Won	
2018	845 (43.16)	Leo 'Akira' Yoshimura; Eugene Lee; Keith Raywood; N. Joseph DeTullio	Production Designer; Production Designer; Production Designer; Production Designer	Won	
2019	864 (44.14) and 868 (44.18)	Eugene Lee; Akira Yoshimura; Keith Ian Raywood; Joseph DeTullio	Production Designer; Production Designer; Production Designer; Production Designer	Won	
2020	881 (45.10) and 885 (45.14)	Eugene Lee; Akira Yoshimura; Keith Ian Raywood; N. Joseph DeTullio	Production Designer; Production Designer; Production Designer; Production Designer	Won	
2021	898 (46.09)	Eugene Lee; Akira Yoshimura; Keith Ian Raywood; N. Joseph DeTullio; Melissa Shakun	Production Designer; Production Designer; Production Designer; Production Designer; Art Director	Won	
2022	911 (47.02)	Eugene Lee; Akira Yoshimura; Keith Ian Raywood; N. Joseph DeTullio; Melissa Shakun	Production Designer; Production Designer; Production Designer; Production Designer; Art Director	Nominated	
2023	938 (48.08) and 945 (48.15)	Akira Yoshimura; Keith Ian Raywood; Andrea Purcigliotti; Danielle Webb	Production Designer; Production Designer; Production Designer; Art Director	Won	
2024	962 (49.14)	Joe DeTullio; Kenneth MacLeod; Melissa Shakun; Kimberly Kachougian	Production Designer; Production Designer; Art Director; Set Decorator	Won	
2025	982 (50.14)	Akira Yoshimura; Keith Ian Raywood; N. Joseph DeTullio; Andrea Purcigliotti; Patrick Lynch; Sara Parks	Production Designer; Production Designer; Production Designer; Production Designer; Art Director; Set Decorator	Won	
2026	1004 (51.16)	Akira Yoshimura; Keith Ian Raywood; N. Joseph DeTullio; Ken MacLeod; Melissa Shakun, Kimberly Kachougian	Production Designer; Production Designer; Production Designer; Production Designer; Art Director; Set Decorator	Nominated	

=== Outstanding Production Design for a Variety Special ===
Year	Title	Individual(s)	Position	Result	Ref.
2025	Saturday Night Live; 50th Anniversary Special	Akira Yoshimura; Keith Ian Raywood; Patrick Lynch; Melissa Shakun; Charlotte Hayes Harrison; Sabrina Lederer	Production Designer; Production Designer; Art Director; Art Director; Art Director; Set Decorator	Nominated	
2025	SNL50: The Homecoming Concert	Keith Ian Raywood; Anthony Bishop; Aaron Black	Production Designer; Supervising Art Director; Art Director	Nominated	

=== Outstanding Prosthetic Makeup ===
Year	Episode(s)	Individual(s)	Position	Result	Ref.
2013	735 (38.11)	Louie Zakarian; Josh Turi; Tom Denier Jr. Craig Lindberg	Department Head Makeup Artist; Makeup Artist; Makeup Artist; Makeup Artist	Nominated	
2017	822 (42.14)	Louie Zakarian; Jason Milani; Tom Denier Jr. Amy Tagliamonti; Craig Lindberg; Steve Kelly	Department Head Makeup Artist; Key Makeup Artist; Key Makeup Artist; Key Makeup Artist; Makeup Artist; Makeup Artist	Nominated	
2025	980 (50.12)	Louie Zakarian; Jason Milani; Amy Tagliamonti; Stephen Kelley; Brandon Grether; Tom Denier Jr. Craig Lindberg	Department Head Makeup Artist; Key Makeup Artist; Key Makeup Artist; Makeup Artist; Makeup Artist; Makeup Artist; Makeup Artist	Nominated	

=== Outstanding Scripted Variety Series ===
Year	Individual(s)	Position	Result	Ref.
2015	Lorne Michaels; Ken Aymong; Lindsay Shookus; Erin Doyle; Steve Higgins; Erik Kenward	Executive Producer; Supervising Producer; Producer; Producer; Producer; Producer	Nominated	
2016	Lorne Michaels; Ken Aymong; Lindsay Shookus; Erin Doyle; Steve Higgins; Erik Kenward	Executive Producer; Supervising Producer; Producer; Producer; Producer; Producer	Nominated	
2017	Lorne Michaels; Ken Aymong; Lindsay Shookus; Erin Doyle; Steve Higgins; Erik Kenward	Executive Producer; Supervising Producer; Producer; Producer; Producer; Producer	Won	
2018	Lorne Michaels; Ken Aymong; Lindsay Shookus; Erin Doyle; Tom Broecker; Steve Higgins; Erik Kenward	Executive Producer; Supervising Producer; Producer; Producer; Producer; Producer; Producer	Won	
2019	Lorne Michaels; Ken Aymong; Lindsay Shookus; Erin Doyle; Tom Broecker; Steve Higgins; Erik Kenward	Executive Producer; Supervising Producer; Producer; Producer; Producer; Producer; Producer	Won	
2020	Lorne Michaels; Ken Aymong; Lindsay Shookus; Erin Doyle; Tom Broecker; Steve Higgins; Erik Kenward	Executive Producer; Supervising Producer; Producer; Producer; Producer; Producer; Producer	Won	
2021	Lorne Michaels; Ken Aymong; Lindsay Shookus; Erin Doyle; Tom Broecker; Caroline Maroney; Steve Higgins; Erik Kenward	Executive Producer; Supervising Producer; Producer; Producer; Producer; Producer; Producer; Producer	Won	
2022	Lorne Michaels; Javier Winnik; Lindsay Shookus; Erin Doyle; Tom Broecker; Caroline Maroney; Steve Higgins; Erik Kenward	Executive Producer; Supervising Producer; Producer; Producer; Producer; Producer; Producer; Producer	Won	
2023	Lorne Michaels; Javier Winnik; Erin Doyle; Tom Broecker; Caroline Maroney; Steve Higgins; Erik Kenward	Executive Producer; Supervising Producer; Producer; Producer; Producer; Producer; Producer	Nominated	
2024	Lorne Michaels; Javier Winnik; Erin Doyle; Tom Broecker; Caroline Maroney; Steve Higgins; Erik Kenward	Executive Producer; Supervising Producer; Producer; Producer; Producer; Producer; Producer	Nominated	
2025	Lorne Michaels; Javier Winnik; Erin Doyle; Tom Broecker; Caroline Maroney; Steve Higgins; Erik Kenward	Executive Producer; Supervising Producer; Producer; Producer; Producer; Producer; Producer	Nominated	

=== Outstanding Short Form Nonfiction or Reality Series ===
Year	Title	Individual(s)	Position	Result	Ref.
2017	Creating Saturday Night Live	Lorne Michaels; Oz Rodriguez; Chris Voss; Michael Scogin; Erik Kenward; Erin Doyle	Executive Producer; Co-Executive Producer; Co-Executive Producer; Supervising Producer; Producer; Producer	Nominated	
2019	Creating Saturday Night Live	Lorne Michaels; Oz Rodriguez; Chris Voss; Matt Yonks; Michael Scogin; Erin Doyle	Executive Producer; Co-Executive Producer; Co-Executive Producer; Co-Executive Producer; Supervising Producer; Producer	Won	
2022	Saturday Night Live Presents: Stories from the Show	Lorne Michaels; Paul Briganti; Grace Shaker; Dina Moles; Sean McIlraith; Matt Yonks	Executive Producer; Co-Executive Producer; Co-Executive Producer; Supervising Producer; Producer; Producer	Nominated	
2023	Saturday Night Live Presents: Behind the Sketch	Lorne Michaels; Grace Shaker; Dina Moles; Dan D'Lauro; Matt Yonks; Mike Diva	Executive Producer; Supervising Producer; Supervising Producer; Producer; Producer; Producer	Nominated	
2024	Saturday Night Live Presents: Behind the Sketch	Lorne Michaels; Grace Shaker; Dina Moles; Matt Yonks; Daniel D'Lauro	Executive Producer; Producer; Producer; Producer; Producer	Nominated	

=== Outstanding Sound Editing for a Nonfiction or Reality Program ===
Year	Title	Individual(s)	Position	Result	Ref.
2025	"Season 11: The Weird Year"	William Harp; Sean Gray	Dialogue Editor; Sound Effects Editor	Nominated	

=== Outstanding Sound Mixing for a Variety Series or Special ===
Year	Episode(s)	Individual(s)	Role	Result	Ref.
1993	339 (18.13)	Robert Palladino; Josiah Gluck; Julie Perez; Chris Arley Seeger; Bill Taylor; Jay Vicari; John Alberts	Senior Production Mixer; Production Mixer; Production Mixer; Production Mixer; Production Mixer; Production Mixer; Re-Recording Mixer	Nominated	
2000	Saturday Night Live; 25th Anniversary Special	Robert Palladino; Chris Arley Seeger; Bill Taylor; Marty Brumbach; Jay Vicari	Senior Production Mixer; Post-Production Mixer; Production Mixer; Music Mixer; Music Mixer	Nominated	
2015	Saturday Night Live; 40th Anniversary Special	Robert Palladino; Bill Taylor; Marty Brumbach; Ezra Matychak; Bob Selitto; Chris Costello; Devin Emke; Josiah Gluck; Bob Clearmountain	Production Mixer; Production Mixer; Production Mixer; Production Mixer; FOH Mixer; Monitor Mixer; Film Audio Mixer; Music Mixer; Music Mixer	Won	
2022	922 (47.13)	Robert Palladino; Ezra Matychak; Bob Selitto; Frank J. Duca Jr. Caroline Sanchez; Josiah Gluck; Tyler McDiarmid; Douglas Nightwine; William Taylor; Devin Emke; Eric Pfeifer; Andrew Guastella	Production Mixer; Production Mixer; FOH Music Mixer; FOH Foldback Mixer; FOH Production Mixer; Music Mixer; Playback Mixer; Monitor Mixer; Sound Effects Mixer; Package Mixer; Package Mixer; Package Mixer	Nominated	
2023	938 (48.08)	Robert Palladino; Ezra Matychak; Frank J. Duca Jr. Caroline Sanchez; Josiah Gluck; Jay Vicari; Tyler McDiarmid; Christopher Costello; Teng Chen; William Taylor; Geoff Countryman; Devin Emke	Production Mixer; Production Mixer; FOH Production Mixer; FOH Music Mixer; Broadcast Music Mixer; Broadcast Music Mixer; Playback Mixer; Monitor Mixer; Supplemental Mixer; Supplemental Mixer; Supplemental Mixer; Post Audio Mixer	Nominated	
2024	964 (49.16)	Robert Palladino; Ezra Matychak; Frank J. Duca Jr. Christopher Costello; Caroline Sanchez; Josiah Gluck; Jay Vicari; Lawrence Manchester; Tyler McDiarmid; Geoff Countryman; Teng Chen; Devin Emke	Production Mixer; Production Mixer; FOH Mixer; FOH Mixer; Monitor Mixer; Music Mixer; Music Mixer; Music Mixer; Playback Mixer; Supplemental Mixer; Supplemental Mixer; Post Audio Mixer	Nominated	
2025	Saturday Night Live; 50th Anniversary Special	Robert Palladino; Ezra Matychak; Frank J. Duca Jr. Doug Nightwine; Christopher Costello; Caroline Sanchez; Josiah Gluck; Jay Vicari; Tyler McDiarmid; Geoff Countryman; Teng Chen; Devin Emke	Production Mixer; Production Mixer; FOH Production Mixer; FOH Production Mixer; Music Monitor Mixer; FOH Music Mixer; Broadcast Music Mixer; Broadcast Music Mixer; Playback Mixer; Supplemental SFX Mixer; Supplemental Mixer; Post Audio Mixer	Won	
2025	SNL50: The Homecoming Concert	Thomas Holmes; Christian Schrader; Eric Schilling; Lawrence Manchester; Dan Gerhard; Jason Crystal; Jamie Pollock; Juan Pablo Velasco; Anthony Lalumia; Mike Bové; Cesar Benitez; Talia Krause; Al Theurer	Production Mixer; Supplemental Audio Mixer; Music Mixer; Music Mixer; FOH Production Mixer; FOH Music Mixer; FOH Music Mixer; ProTools Mixer; ProTools Mixer; Monitor Mixer; Monitor Mixer; Monitor Mixer; Playback Mixer	Nominated	

=== Outstanding Stunt Coordination for a Comedy Series or Variety Program ===
Year	Individual(s)	Position	Result	Ref.
2015	Jeffrey Lee Gibson	Stunt Coordinator	Nominated	
2016	Brian Smyj	Stunt Coordinator	Nominated	
2017	Brian Smyj	Stunt Coordinator	Nominated	
2018	Brian Smyj	Stunt Coordinator	Nominated	

=== Outstanding Supporting Actor in a Comedy Series ===
Year	Episode(s)	Individual(s)	Role	Result	Ref.
1983	(Note: There was no specified episode in which Murphy was nominated.)	Eddie Murphy	Various Characters	Nominated	
2012	711 (37.9)	Bill Hader	Various Characters	Nominated	
2013	725 (38.1)	Bill Hader	Various Characters	Nominated	
2017	828 (42.20)	Alec Baldwin	Donald Trump	Won	
2018	848 (43.19)	Alec Baldwin	Donald Trump	Nominated	
2018	847 (43.19)	Kenan Thompson	Various Characters	Nominated	
2020	SNL at Home #2 (45.17)	Kenan Thompson	Various Characters	Nominated	
2021	895 (46.06)	Kenan Thompson	Various Characters	Nominated	
2021	906 (46.17)	Bowen Yang	Various Characters	Nominated	
2022	906 (47.03)	Bowen Yang	Various Characters	Nominated	
2024	954 (49.06)	Bowen Yang	Various Characters	Nominated	
2025	969 (50.01)	Bowen Yang	Various Characters	Nominated	

=== Outstanding Supporting Actress in a Comedy Series ===
Year	Episode(s)	Individual(s)	Role	Result	Ref.
2008	629 (33.5)	Amy Poehler	Various Characters	Nominated	
2009	641 (34.5)	Amy Poehler	Various Characters	Nominated	
2009	648 (34.12)	Kristen Wiig	Various Characters	Nominated	
2010	668 (35.10)	Kristen Wiig	Various Characters	Nominated	
2011	683 (36.3)	Kristen Wiig	Various Characters	Nominated	
2012	724 (37.22)	Kristen Wiig	Various Characters	Nominated	
2014	762 (39.17)	Kate McKinnon	Various Characters	Nominated	
2015	784 (40.18)	Kate McKinnon	Various Characters	Nominated	
2016	802 (41.15)	Kate McKinnon	Various Characters	Won	
2017		Kate McKinnon	Various Characters		
2017	814 (42.06)	Kate McKinnon	Various Characters	Won	
2017	829 (42.21)	Vanessa Bayer	Various Characters	Nominated	
2017	812 (42.04)	Leslie Jones	Various Characters	Nominated	
2018	846 (43.17)	Aidy Bryant	Various Characters	Nominated	
2018	848 (43.19)	Leslie Jones	Various Characters	Nominated	
2018	845 (43.16)	Kate McKinnon	Various Characters	Nominated	
2019	855 (44.05)	Kate McKinnon	Various Characters	Nominated	
2020	886 (45.15)	Kate McKinnon	Various Characters	Nominated	
2020	881 (45.10)	Cecily Strong	Various Characters	Nominated	
2021	902 (46.13)	Aidy Bryant	Various Characters	Nominated	
2021	891 (46.02)	Kate McKinnon	Various Characters	Nominated	
2021	909 (46.20)	Cecily Strong	Various Characters	Nominated	
2022	930 (47.21)	Kate McKinnon	Various Characters	Nominated	

=== Outstanding Technical Direction and Camerawork for a Series ===
Year	Episode(s)	Individual(s)	Position	Result	Ref.
1979	82 (4.16)	Heino Ripp; Peter Basil; Al Camoin; Tom De Zendorf; Vince Di Pietro; John Pinto	Technical Director; Camera Operator; Camera Operator; Camera Operator; Camera Operator; Camera Operator	Nominated	
1983	151 (8.12)	Heino Ripp; Michael Bennett; Al Camoin; Jan Kasoff; John Pinto; Maurey Verschoore	Technical Director; Camera Operator; Camera Operator; Camera Operator; Camera Operator; Camera Operator	Won	
1990	277 (15.11)	Terry Rohnke; Joe Debonis; Steve Jambeck; Jan Kasoff; John Pinto; Robert Reese; Bruce Shapiro	Technical Director; Camera Operator; Camera Operator; Camera Operator; Camera Operator; Camera Operator; Senior Video Control	Won	
1994	359 (19.13)	Steven Cimino; Michael Bennett; Carl Eckett; Jan Kasoff; John Pinto; Robert Reese; William Vaccaro	Technical Director; Camera Operator; Camera Operator; Camera Operator; Camera Operator; Camera Operator; Senior Video Control	Won	
1995	—N/a	Steven Cimino; Michael Bennett; Carl Eckett; Jan Kasoff; John Pinto; Robert Reese; Gregory Aull; William Vaccaro	Technical Director; Camera Operator; Camera Operator; Camera Operator; Camera Operator; Camera Operator; Senior Video Control; Senior Video Control	Won	
1996	396 (21.10)	Steven Cimino; Michael Bennett; Carl Eckett; Jan Kasoff; John Pinto; Robert Reese; Gregory Aull; Frank Grisanti	Technical Director; Camera Operator; Camera Operator; Camera Operator; Camera Operator; Camera Operator; Senior Video Control; Senior Video Control	Nominated	
1997	410 (22.4)	Steven Cimino; Michael Bennett; Carl Eckett; Jan Kasoff; John Pinto; Robert Reese; Gregory Aull; Frank Grisanti	Technical Director; Camera Operator; Camera Operator; Camera Operator; Camera Operator; Camera Operator; Senior Video Control; Senior Video Control	Nominated	
1998	434 (23.8)	Steven Cimino; Michael Bennett; Carl Eckett; Barry Frischer; Jan Kasoff; John Pinto; Robert Reese; Gregory Aull; Frank Grisanti	Technical Director; Camera Operator; Camera Operator; Camera Operator; Camera Operator; Camera Operator; Camera Operator; Senior Video Control; Senior Video Control	Nominated	
1999	450 (24.4)	Steven Cimino; Michael Bennett; Carl Eckett; Richard B. Fox; Barry Frischer; Jan Kasoff; Brian Phraner; John Pinto; Frank Grisanti; Susan Noll; Michael Ruiz	Technical Director; Camera Operator; Camera Operator; Camera Operator; Camera Operator; Camera Operator; Camera Operator; Camera Operator; Senior Video Control; Senior Video Control; Senior Video Control	Nominated	
2000	481 (25.16)	Steven Cimino; Michael Bennett; Carl Eckett; Richard B. Fox; Jan Kasoff; John Pinto; Frank Grisanti; Susan Noll	Technical Director; Camera Operator; Camera Operator; Camera Operator; Camera Operator; Camera Operator; Senior Video Control; Senior Video Control	Won (Note: Tied with Politically Incorrect with Bill Maher.)	
2001	505 (26.20)	Steven Cimino; Michael Bennett; Carl Eckett; Richard B. Fox; John Pinto; Frank Grisanti; Susan Noll; Brian Phraner	Technical Director; Camera Operator; Camera Operator; Camera Operator; Camera Operator; Camera Operator; Senior Video Control; Senior Video Control	Nominated	
2002	517 (27.12)	Steven Cimino; Michael Bennett; Carl Eckett; Richard B. Fox; Jan Kasoff; John Pinto; Frank Grisanti; Susan Noll	Technical Director; Camera Operator; Camera Operator; Camera Operator; Camera Operator; Camera Operator; Senior Video Control; Senior Video Control	Won	
2003	538 (28.13)	Steven Cimino; Michael Bennett; Brian Phraner; John Pinto; Richard B. Fox; Jimmy Mott; Susan Noll; Frank Grisanti	Technical Director; Camera Operator; Camera Operator; Camera Operator; Camera Operator; Camera Operator; Senior Video Control; Senior Video Control	Won	
2004	562 (29.17)	Steven Cimino; Michael Bennett; Eric A. Eisenstein; Richard B. Fox; Brian Phraner; John Pinto; Frank Grisanti; Susan Noll	Technical Director; Camera Operator; Camera Operator; Camera Operator; Camera Operator; Camera Operator; Senior Video Control; Senior Video Control	Won	
2005	577 (30.12)	Steven Cimino; John Pinto; Michael Bennett; Brian Phraner; Richard B. Fox; Eric A. Eisenstein; Susan Noll; Frank Grisanti	Technical Director; Camera Operator; Camera Operator; Camera Operator; Camera Operator; Camera Operator; Senior Video Control; Senior Video Control	Nominated	
2006	594 (31.9)	Steven Cimino; John Pinto; Michael Bennett; Brian Phraner; Richard B. Fox; Eric A. Eisenstein; Susan Noll; Frank Grisanti	Technical Director; Camera Operator; Camera Operator; Camera Operator; Camera Operator; Camera Operator; Senior Video Control; Senior Video Control	Nominated	
2007	609 (32.5)	Steven Cimino; John Pinto; Richard B. Fox; Brian Phraner; Barry Frischer; Eric A. Eisenstein; Susan Noll; Frank Grisanti	Technical Director; Camera Operator; Camera Operator; Camera Operator; Camera Operator; Camera Operator; Senior Video Control; Senior Video Control	Won	
2009	641 (34.5)	Steven Cimino; John Pinto; Paul J. Cangialosi; Len Wechsler; Barry Frischer; Eric A. Eisenstein; Susan Noll; Frank Grisanti	Technical Director; Camera Operator; Camera Operator; Camera Operator; Camera Operator; Camera Operator; Senior Video Control; Senior Video Control	Nominated	
2010	665 (35.7)	Steven Cimino; John Pinto; Paul J. Cangialosi; Len Wechsler; Barry Frischer; Eric A. Eisenstein; Susan Noll; Frank Grisanti	Technical Director; Camera Operator; Camera Operator; Camera Operator; Camera Operator; Camera Operator; Video Control; Video Control	Nominated	
2011	702 (36.22)	Steven Cimino; Johnny Pinto; Paul Cangialosi; Eric Eisenstein; Len Wechsler; Barry Frisher; Frank Grisanti; Susan Noll	Technical Director; Camera Operator; Camera Operator; Camera Operator; Camera Operator; Camera Operator; Video Control; Video Control	Nominated	
2012	724 (37.22)	Steven Cimino; Barry Frischer; John Pinto; Paul Cangialosi; Len Wechsler; Eric Eisenstein; Frank Grisanti; Susan Noll	Technical Director; Camera Operator; Camera Operator; Camera Operator; Camera Operator; Camera Operator; Video Control; Video Control	Won	
2013	734 (38.10)	Steven Cimino; Johnny Pinto; Eric Eisenstein; Len Wechsler; Barry Frisher; Frank Grisanti; Susan Noll	Technical Director; Camera Operator; Camera Operator; Camera Operator; Camera Operator; Video Control; Video Control	Nominated	
2014	755 (39.10)	Steven Cimino; Paul Cangialosi; Joe DeBonis; Kurt Decker; Eric Eisenstein; Barry Frischer; John Pinto; Len Wechsler; Frank Grisanti; Susan Noll	Technical Director; Camera Operator; Camera Operator; Camera Operator; Camera Operator; Camera Operator; Camera Operator; Camera Operator; Senior Video Control; Senior Video Control	Nominated	
2015	784 (40.18)	Steven Cimino; Paul Cangialosi; Michael Cimino; Carl Eckett; Eric Eisenstein; John Pinto; Len Wechsler; Frank Grisanti; Susan Noll	Technical Director; Camera Operator; Camera Operator; Camera Operator; Camera Operator; Camera Operator; Camera Operator; Video Control; Video Control	Won	
2016	802 (41.15)	Steven Cimino; John Pinto; Paul Cangialosi; Len Wechsler; Joe DeBonis; Eric Eisenstein; Susan Noll; Frank Grisanti	Technical Director; Camera Operator; Camera Operator; Camera Operator; Camera Operator; Camera Operator; Video Control; Video Control	Nominated	
2017	826 (42.18)	Steven Cimino; John Pinto; Paul Cangialosi; Eric Eisenstein; Len Wechsler; Dave Driscoll; Jeff Latonero; Ann Bergstrom; Randy Bittle; Frank Grisanti; Susan Noll	Technical Director; Camera Operator; Camera Operator; Camera Operator; Camera Operator; Camera Operator; Camera Operator; Camera Operator; Camera Operator; Video Control; Video Control	Won	
2018	848 (43.19)	Steven Cimino; John Pinto; Paul Cangialosi; Len Wechsler; Dave Driscoll; Eric A. Eisenstein; Joe DeBonis; Frank Grisanti; Susan Noll	Technical Director; Camera Operator; Camera Operator; Camera Operator; Camera Operator; Camera Operator; Camera Operator; Video Control; Video Control	Won	
2019	869 (44.19)	Steven Cimino; Frank Grisanti; Susan Noll; John Pinto; Paul Cangialosi; Len Wechsler; Dave Driscoll; Eric A. Eisenstein	Technical Director; Video Control; Video Control; Camera; Camera; Camera; Camera; Camera	Nominated	
2020	872 (45.1)	Steven Cimino; Frank Grisanti; Ted Natoli; John Pinto; Paul Cangialosi; Len Wechsler; Dave Driscoll; Eric A. Eisenstein; Dante Pagano	Technical Director; Video Control; Video Control; Camera; Camera; Camera; Camera; Camera; Camera	Nominated	
2021	900 (46.11)	Steven Cimino; Frank Grisanti; Roberto Lopez; John Pinto; Paul Cangialosi; Joe DeBonis; Dave Driscoll; Eric A. Eisenstein; Franco Coello	Technical Director; Video Control; Video Control; Camera; Camera; Camera; Camera; Camera; Camera	Nominated	
2024	952 (49.04)	Bill DiGiovanni; John Pinto; Paul Cangialosi; Anthony Tarantino; Dave Driscoll; Brian Phraner; Daniel Erbeck	Technical Director; Camera; Camera; Camera; Camera; Camera; Camera	Won	
2025	984 (50.16)	Bill DiGiovanni; John Pinto; Paul Cangialosi; Anthony Tarantino; Dave Driscoll; Brian Phraner; Daniel Erbeck	Technical Director; Camera; Camera; Camera; Camera; Camera; Camera	Won	
2026	1006 (51.18)	Bill DiGiovanni; John Pinto; Paul Cangialosi; Anthony Tarantino; Dave Driscoll; Brian Phraner; Daniel Erbeck	Technical Director; Camera; Camera; Camera; Camera; Camera; Camera	Nominated	

=== Outstanding Technical Direction and Camerawork for a Special ===
Year	Title	Individual(s)	Position	Result	Ref.
2000	Saturday Night Live; 25th Anniversary Special	Steven Cimino; Michael Bennett; Carl Eckett; Eric Eisenstein; John Kasoff; James Mott; Stephen Murello; John Pinto; Susan Noll; Frank Grisanti	Technical Director; Camera Operator; Camera Operator; Camera Operator; Camera Operator; Camera Operator; Camera Operator; Camera Operator; Senior Video Control; Senior Video Control	Nominated	
2015	Saturday Night Live; 40th Anniversary Special	Steven Cimino; Paul Cangialosi; Carl Eckett; Eric Eisenstein; Rich Freedman; Chuck Goslin; Johnny Pinto; Len Wechsler; Frank Grisanti; Susan Noll	Technical Director; Camera Operator; Camera Operator; Camera Operator; Camera Operator; Camera Operator; Camera Operator; Camera Operator; Video Control; Video Control	Nominated	
2025	Saturday Night Live; 50th Anniversary Special	Bill DiGiovanni; John Pinto; Paul Cangialosi; Anthony Tarantino; Dave Driscoll; Brian Phraner; Daniel Erbeck; Michael Knarre; Anthony Lenzo; Ansel Nunez; Rick Fox	Technical Director; Camera Operator; Camera Operator; Camera Operator; Camera Operator; Camera Operator; Camera Operator; Camera Operator; Camera Operator; Camera Operator; Camera Operator	Won	

=== Outstanding Title Design ===
Year	Episode(s)	Individual(s)	Role	Result	Ref.
1976	10 (1.10)	Edie Baskin; Bob Pook	Title Sequence Creator; Title Sequence Creator	Nominated	
1985	—N/a	Charles Levi; Alex Weil	Title Sequence Creator; Title Sequence Creator	Won	

=== Outstanding Variety Series ===
Year	Episode(s)	Individual(s)	Position	Result	Ref.
1976	—N/a	Lorne Michaels	Producer	Won	
1977	—N/a	Lorne Michaels	Producer	Nominated	
1978	—N/a	Lorne Michaels	Producer	Nominated	
1979	—N/a	Lorne Michaels; Dan Aykroyd; John Belushi; Jane Curtin; Garrett Morris; Bill Murray; Laraine Newman; Gilda Radner	Producer; Performer; Performer; Performer; Performer; Performer; Performer; Performer	Nominated	
1989	—N/a	Lorne Michaels; James Downey	Executive Producer; Producer	Nominated	
1990	284 (15.18)	Lorne Michaels; James Downey	Executive Producer; Producer	Nominated	
1993	—N/a	Lorne Michaels; James Downey; Al Franken	Executive Producer; Producer; Producer	Won	
1994	—N/a	Lorne Michaels; James Downey	Executive Producer; Producer	Nominated	
2001	—N/a	Lorne Michaels; Ken Aymong; Steve Higgins	Executive Producer; Supervising Producer; Producer	Nominated	
2002	—N/a	Lorne Michaels; Ken Aymong; Steve Higgins	Executive Producer; Supervising Producer; Producer	Nominated	
2003	—N/a	Lorne Michaels; Ken Aymong; Michael Shoemaker; Marci Klein; Steve Higgins	Executive Producer; Supervising Producer; Producer; Producer; Producer	Nominated	
2004	—N/a	Lorne Michaels; Ken Aymong; Michael Shoemaker; Marci Klein; Steve Higgins	Executive Producer; Supervising Producer; Producer; Producer; Producer	Nominated	
2008	—N/a	Lorne Michaels; Ken Aymong; Michael Shoemaker; Marci Klein; Steve Higgins	Executive Producer; Supervising Producer; Producer; Producer; Producer	Nominated	
2009	—N/a	Lorne Michaels; Ken Aymong; Michael Shoemaker; Marci Klein; Steve Higgins	Executive Producer; Supervising Producer; Producer; Producer; Producer	Nominated	
2010	—N/a	Lorne Michaels; Steve Higgins; Marci Klein; Ken Aymong	Executive Producer; Producer; Producer; Supervising Producer	Nominated	
2011	—N/a	Lorne Michaels; Steve Higgins; Ken Aymong	Executive Producer; Producer; Supervising Producer	Nominated	
2012	—N/a	Lorne Michaels; Ken Aymong; Steve Higgins; Erik Kenward; John Mulaney	Executive Producer; Supervising Producer; Producer; Producer; Producer	Nominated	
2013	—N/a	Lorne Michaels; Ken Aymong; Lindsay Shookus; Erin Doyle; Steve Higgins; Erik Kenward	Executive Producer; Supervising Producer; Producer; Producer; Producer; Producer	Nominated	
2014	—N/a	Lorne Michaels; Ken Aymong; Lindsay Shookus; Erin Doyle; Steve Higgins; Erik Kenward	Executive Producer; Supervising Producer; Producer; Producer; Producer; Producer	Nominated	
2026	—N/a	Lorne Michaels; Ken Aymong; Tom Broecker; Caroline Maroney; Steve Higgins; Erik Kenward; Erin Doyle	Executive Producer; Supervising Producer; Producer; Producer; Producer; Producer; Producer	Nominated	

=== Outstanding Variety Special (Live) ===
Year	Title	Individual(s)	Position	Result	Ref.
2025	Saturday Night Live 50th Anniversary Special	Lorne Michaels; Javier Winnik; Erin Doyle; Tom Broecker; Caroline Maroney; Colin Jost; Michael Che; Steve Higgins; Erik Kenward	Executive Producer; Supervising Producer; Producer; Producer; Producer; Producer; Producer; Producer; Producer	Won	
2025	SNL50: The Homecoming Concert	Lorne Michaels; Mark Ronson; Rob Paine; Ken Aymong; Karen Scarminach; Sam Kruger; Erin David; Jimmy Fallon	Executive Producer; Executive Producer; Supervising Producer; Supervising Producer; Line Producer; Producer; Producer; Host	Nominated	

=== Outstanding Variety Special (Pre-Recorded) ===
Year	Title	Individual(s)	Position	Result	Ref.
2000	Saturday Night Live 25th Anniversary Special	Lorne Michaels; Ken Aymong; Marci Klein; Michael Shoemaker	Executive Producer; Supervising Producer; Producer; Producer	Won	
2001	Saturday Night Live's Presidential Bash 2000	Lorne Michaels; Ken Aymong; Marci Klein; James Downey	Executive Producer; Supervising Producer; Supervising Producer; Producer	Nominated	
2013	Saturday Night Live Weekend Update Thursday (Part One)	Lorne Michaels; Ken Aymong; Lindsay Shookus; Erin Doyle; Steve Higgins; Erik Kenward; Alex Baze	Executive Producer; Supervising Producer; Producer; Producer; Producer; Producer; Producer	Nominated	
2015	Saturday Night Live 40th Anniversary Special	Lorne Michaels; Ken Aymong; Lindsay Shookus; Erin Doyle; Rhys Thomas; Steve Higgins; Erik Kenward	Executive Producer; Supervising Producer; Producer; Producer; Producer; Producer; Producer	Won	

=== Outstanding Writing for a Variety Series ===
Year	Episode(s)	Individual(s)	Position	Result	Ref.
1976	9 (1.9)	Anne Beatts; Chevy Chase; Tom Davis; Al Franken; Lorne Michaels; Marilyn Suzanne Miller; Michael O'Donoghue; Herb Sargent; Tom Schiller; Rosie Shuster; Alan Zweibel	Writer; Writer; Writer; Writer; Writer; Writer; Writer; Writer; Writer; Writer; Writer	Won	
1977	39 (2.15)	Dan Aykroyd; John Belushi; Tom Davis; James Downey; Al Franken; Lorne Michaels; Marilyn Suzanne Miller; Bill Murray; Michael O'Donoghue; Herb Sargent; Tom Schiller; Rosie Shuster; Alan Zweibel	Writer; Writer; Writer; Writer; Writer; Writer; Writer; Writer; Writer; Writer; Writer; Writer; Writer	Won	
1977	43 (2.19)	Anne Beatts; Chevy Chase; Tom Davis; Al Franken; Lorne Michaels; Marilyn Suzanne Miller; Michael O'Donoghue; Herb Sargent; Tom Schiller; Rosie Shuster; Alan Zweibel	Writer; Writer; Writer; Writer; Writer; Writer; Writer; Writer; Writer; Writer; Writer	Nominated	
1978	47 (3.1)	Dan Aykroyd; Anne Beatts; Tom Davis; James Downey; Brian Doyle-Murray; Al Franken; Lorne Michaels; Marilyn Suzanne Miller; Don Novello; Michael O'Donoghue; Herb Sargent; Tom Schiller; Rosie Shuster; Alan Zweibel	Writer; Writer; Writer; Writer; Writer; Writer; Writer; Writer; Writer; Writer; Writer; Writer; Writer; Writer	Nominated	
1979	82 (4.16)	Dan Aykroyd; Anne Beatts; Tom Davis; James Downey; Brian Doyle-Murray; Al Franken; Brian McConnachie; Lorne Michaels; Don Novello; Herb Sargent; Tom Schiller; Harry Shearer; Rosie Shuster; Walter Williams; Alan Zweibel	Writer; Writer; Writer; Writer; Writer; Writer; Writer; Writer; Writer; Writer; Writer; Writer; Writer; Writer; Writer	Nominated	
1980	95 (5.9)	Peter Aykroyd; Anne Beatts; Tom Davis; James Downey; Brian Doyle-Murray; Al Franken; Tom Gammill; Lorne Michaels; Matt Neuman; Don Novello; Sarah Paley; Max Pross; Herb Sargent; Tom Schiller; Harry Shearer; Rosie Shuster; Alan Zweibel	Writer; Writer; Writer; Writer; Writer; Writer; Writer; Writer; Writer; Writer; Writer; Writer; Writer; Writer; Writer; Writer; Writer	Nominated	
1984	—N/a	James Belushi; Andy Breckman; Robin Duke; Adam Green; Mary Gross; Nate Herman; Tim Kazurinsky; Kevin Kelton; Andrew Kurtzman; Michael C. McCarthy; Eddie Murphy; Pamela Norris; Margaret Oberman; Joe Piscopo; Herb Sargent; Andrew Smith; Bob Tischler; Eliot Wald	Writer; Writer; Writer; Writer; Writer; Writer; Writer; Writer; Writer; Writer; Writer; Writer; Writer; Writer; Writer; Writer; Writer; Writer	Nominated	
1987	—N/a	Andy Breckman; A. Whitney Brown; E. Jean Carroll; Tom Davis; James Downey; Al Franken; Eddie Gorodetsky; Phil Hartman; George Meyer; Lorne Michaels; Kevin Nealon; Margaret Oberman; Herb Sargent; Marc Shaiman; Rosie Shuster; Robert Smigel; Bonnie Turner; Terry Turner; Jon Vitti; Christine Zander	Writer; Writer; Writer; Writer; Writer; Writer; Writer; Writer; Writer; Writer; Writer; Writer; Writer; Writer; Writer; Writer; Writer; Writer; Writer; Writer	Nominated	
1989	—N/a	James Downey; John Bowman; A. Whitney Brown; Greg Daniels; Tom Davis; Al Franken; Shannon Gaughan; Jack Handey; Phil Hartman; Tom Hymes; Lorne Michaels; Mike Myers; Conan O'Brien; Bob Odenkirk; Herb Sargent; Tom Schiller; Rob Schneider; Robert Smigel; Bonnie Turner; Terry Turner; Christine Zander; George Meyer	Head Writer; Writer; Writer; Writer; Writer; Writer; Writer; Writer; Writer; Writer; Writer; Writer; Writer; Writer; Writer; Writer; Writer; Writer; Writer; Writer; Writer; Additional Sketches	Won	
1990	284 (15.18)	James Downey; A. Whitney Brown; Greg Daniels; Tom Davis; Al Franken; Jack Handey; Tom Hymes; Lorne Michaels; Mike Myers; Conan O'Brien; Bob Odenkirk; Herb Sargent; Tom Schiller; Rob Schneider; Robert Smigel; David Spade; Bonnie Turner; Terry Turner; Christine Zander	Head Writer; Writer; Writer; Writer; Writer; Writer; Writer; Writer; Writer; Writer; Writer; Writer; Writer; Writer; Writer; Writer; Writer; Writer; Writer	Nominated	
1991	299 (16.13)	A. Whitney Brown; Tom Davis; James Downey; Al Franken; Jack Handey; Lorne Michaels; Conan O'Brien; Bob Odenkirk; Andrew Robin; Adam Sandler; Herb Sargent; Rob Schneider; Robert Smigel; David Spade; Bonnie Turner; Terry Turner; Christine Zander	Writer; Writer; Writer; Writer; Writer; Writer; Writer; Writer; Writer; Writer; Writer; Writer; Writer; Writer; Writer; Writer; Writer	Nominated	
1992	—N/a	Tom Davis; James Downey; Al Franken; Jack Handey; Warren Hutcherson; Steve Koren; Daniel McGrath; Lorne Michaels; Adam Sandler; Herb Sargent; Rob Schneider; Robert Smigel; Bonnie Turner; Terry Turner; Christine Zander	Writer; Writer; Writer; Writer; Writer; Writer; Writer; Writer; Writer; Writer; Writer; Writer; Writer; Writer; Writer	Nominated	
1993	337 (18.11)	Tom Davis; James Downey; Al Franken; Jack Handey; Bruce Handey; Warren Hutcherson; Steve Koren; David Mandel; Ian Maxtone-Graham; Tim Meadows; Lorne Michaels; Vanessa Middleton; Adam Sandler; Herb Sargent; Robert Smigel; David Spade; Bonnie Turner; Terry Turner; Christine Zander	Writer; Writer; Writer; Writer; Writer; Writer; Writer; Writer; Writer; Writer; Writer; Writer; Writer; Writer; Writer; Writer; Writer; Writer; Writer	Nominated	
2001	—N/a	Tina Fey; Dennis McNicholas; James Anderson; Robert Carlock; Jerry Collins; Tony Daro; James Downey; Hugh Fink; Melanie Graham; Tim Herlihy; Steve Higgins; Erik Kenward; Adam McKay; Lorne Michaels; Jerry Minor; Matt Murray; Paula Pell; Matt Piedmont; Jon Rosenfeld; Michael Schur; T. Sean Shannon; Robert Smigel; Andrew Steele; Scott Wainio	Head Writer; Head Writer; Writer; Writer; Writer; Writer; Writer; Writer; Writer; Writer; Writer; Writer; Writer; Writer; Writer; Writer; Writer; Writer; Writer; Writer; Writer; Writer; Writer; Writer	Nominated	
2002	—N/a	Tina Fey; Dennis McNicholas; Doug Abeles; James Anderson; Max Brooks; James Downey; Hugh Fink; Charlie Grandy; Steve Higgins; Erik Kenward; Lorne Michaels; Matt Murray; Paula Pell; Matt Piedmont; Ken Scarborough; Michael Schur; Frank Sebastiano; T. Sean Shannon; Eric Slovin; Robert Smigel; Emily Spivey; Andrew Steele; Scott Wainio	Head Writer; Head Writer; Writer; Writer; Writer; Writer; Writer; Writer; Writer; Writer; Writer; Writer; Writer; Writer; Writer; Writer; Writer; Writer; Writer; Writer; Writer; Writer; Writer	Won	
2003	—N/a	Tina Fey; Dennis McNicholas; Doug Abeles; Leo Allen; James Anderson; Max Brooks; James Downey; James Eagan; Al Franken; Kristin Gore; Charlie Grandy; Steve Higgins; Erik Kenward; Lorne Michaels; Corwin Moore; Matt Murray; Paula Pell; Ken Scarborough; Michael Schur; Frank Sebastiano; T. Sean Shannon; Eric Slovin; Robert Smigel; Emily Spivey; Andrew Steele; Scott Wainio	Head Writer; Head Writer; Writer; Writer; Writer; Writer; Writer; Writer; Writer; Writer; Writer; Writer; Writer; Writer; Writer; Writer; Writer; Writer; Writer; Writer; Writer; Writer; Writer; Writer; Writer; Writer	Nominated	
2008	—N/a	Seth Meyers; Andrew Steele; Paula Pell; Doug Abeles; James Anderson; Alex Baze; Jessica Conrad; James Downey; Charlie Grandy; Steve Higgins; Colin Jost; Erik Kenward; Rob Klein; John Lutz; Lorne Michaels; John Mulaney; Simon Rich; Marika Sawyer; Akiva Schaffer; Robert Smigel; John Solomon; Emily Spivey; Kent Sublette; Jorma Taccone; Bryan Tucker; Robert Carlock; Lauren Pomerantz	Head Writer; Head Writer; Head Writer; Writer; Writer; Writer; Writer; Writer; Writer; Writer; Writer; Writer; Writer; Writer; Writer; Writer; Writer; Writer; Writer; Writer; Writer; Writer; Writer; Writer; Writer; Additional Sketch Writer; Additional Sketch Writer	Nominated	
2009	—N/a	Seth Meyers; Doug Abeles; James Anderson; Alex Baze; Jessica Conrad; James Downey; Steve Higgins; Colin Jost; Erik Kenward; Rob Klein; John Lutz; Lorne Michaels; John Mulaney; Paula Pell; Simon Rich; Marika Sawyer; Akiva Schaffer; John Solomon; Emily Spivey; Kent Sublette; Jorma Taccone; Bryan Tucker	Head Writer; Writer; Writer; Writer; Writer; Writer; Writer; Writer; Writer; Writer; Writer; Writer; Writer; Writer; Writer; Writer; Writer; Writer; Writer; Writer; Writer; Writer	Nominated	
2010	679 (35.21)	Doug Abeles; James Anderson; Alex Baze; Jillian Bell; Hannibal Buress; Jessica Conrad; James Downey; Steve Higgins; Colin Jost; Erik Kenward; Jessi Klein; Rob Klein; John Lutz; Seth Meyers; Lorne Michaels; John Mulaney; Christine Nangle; Michael Patrick O'Brien; Paula Pell; Ryan Perez; Simon Rich; Marika Sawyer; Akiva Schaffer; John Solomon; Emily Spivey; Kent Sublette; Jorma Taccone; Bryan Tucker	Writer; Writer; Writer; Writer; Writer; Writer; Writer; Writer; Writer; Writer; Writer; Writer; Writer; Writer; Writer; Writer; Writer; Writer; Writer; Writer; Writer; Writer; Writer; Writer; Writer; Writer; Writer; Writer	Nominated	
2011	—N/a	Doug Abeles; James Anderson; Alex Baze; Heather Anne Campbell; Jessica Conrad; Matthew Craig; James Downey; Tom Flanigan; Shelly Gossman; Steve Higgins; Colin Jost; Erik Kenward; Rob Klein; Seth Meyers; Lorne Michaels; John Mulaney; Christine Nangle; Michael Patrick O'Brien; Paula Pell; Simon Rich; Marika Sawyer; Akiva Schaffer; Sarah Schneider; John Solomon; Kent Sublette; Jorma Taccone; Bryan Tucker	Writer; Writer; Writer; Writer; Writer; Writer; Writer; Writer; Writer; Writer; Writer; Writer; Writer; Writer; Writer; Writer; Writer; Writer; Writer; Writer; Writer; Writer; Writer; Writer; Writer; Writer; Writer	Nominated	
2012	—N/a	James Anderson; Alex Baze; Jessica Conrad; James Downey; Shelly Gossman; Steve Higgins; Colin Jost; Zach Kanin; Chris Kelly; Erik Kenward; Rob Klein; Seth Meyers; Lorne Michaels; John Mulaney; Christine Nangle; Michael Patrick O'Brien; Paula Pell; Marika Sawyer; Sarah Schneider; Pete Schultz; John Solomon; Kent Sublette; Bryan Tucker; Emily Spivey	Writer; Writer; Writer; Writer; Writer; Writer; Writer; Writer; Writer; Writer; Writer; Writer; Writer; Writer; Writer; Writer; Writer; Writer; Writer; Writer; Writer; Writer; Writer; Additional Sketch	Nominated	
2013	—N/a	James Anderson; Alex Baze; Neil Casey; James Downey; Steve Higgins; Colin Jost; Zach Kanin; Chris Kelly; Joe Kelly; Erik Kenward; Rob Klein; Seth Meyers; Lorne Michaels; Mike O'Brien; Josh Patten; Marika Sawyer; Sarah Schneider; Pete Schultz; John Solomon; Kent Sublette; Bryan Tucker; Robert Smigel	Writer; Writer; Writer; Writer; Writer; Writer; Writer; Writer; Writer; Writer; Writer; Writer; Writer; Writer; Writer; Writer; Writer; Writer; Writer; Writer; Writer; Additional Sketch	Nominated	
2016	—N/a	Rob Klein; Bryan Tucker; James Anderson; Jeremy Beiler; Chris Belair; Megan Callahan; Michael Che; Mikey Day; Fran Gillespie; Sudi Green; Steve Higgins; Colin Jost; Zach Kanin; Chris Kelly; Erik Kenward; Paul Masella; Dave McCary; Dennis McNicholas; Seth Meyers; Fred Armisen; Lorne Michaels; Josh Patten; Katie Rich; Tim Robinson; Sarah Schneider; Pete Schultz; Streeter Seidell; Dave Sirus; Will Stephen; Kent Sublette; Julio Torres	Head Writer; Head Writer; Writer; Writer; Writer; Writer; Writer; Writer; Writer; Writer; Writer; Writer; Writer; Writer; Writer; Writer; Writer; Writer; Writer; Writer; Writer; Writer; Writer; Writer; Writer; Writer; Writer; Writer; Writer; Writer; Writer	Nominated	
2017	—N/a	Chris Kelly; Sarah Schneider; Kent Sublette; Bryan Tucker; James Anderson; Kristen Bartlett; Jeremy Beiler; Zack Bornstein; Joanna Bradley; Megan Callahan; Michael Che; Anna Drezen; Fran Gillespie; Sudi Green; Steve Higgins; Colin Jost; Erik Kenward; Rob Klein; Nick Kocher; Dave McCary; Brian McElhaney; Dennis McNicholas; Drew Michael; Lorne Michaels; Josh Patten; Katie Rich; Pete Schultz; Streeter Seidell; Will Stephen; Julio Torres	Head Writer; Head Writer; Head Writer; Head Writer; Writer; Writer; Writer; Writer; Writer; Writer; Writer; Writer; Writer; Writer; Writer; Writer; Writer; Writer; Writer; Writer; Writer; Writer; Writer; Writer; Writer; Writer; Writer; Writer; Writer; Writer	Nominated	
2018	—N/a	Michael Che; Colin Jost; Kent Sublette; Bryan Tucker; James Anderson; Steven Castillo; Andrew Dismukes; Megan Callahan; Anna Drezen; Claire Friedman; Steve Higgins; Sam Jay; Erik Kenward; Michael Koman; Dave McCary; Dennis McNicholas; Lorne Michaels; Nimesh Patel; Josh Patten; Katie Rich; Gary Richardson; Pete Schultz; Will Stephen; Julio Torres; Stephen Glover; Jamal Olori; Tim Kalpakis; Erik Marino; Fran Gillespie; Sudi Green; Streeter Seidell	Head Writer; Head Writer; Head Writer; Head Writer; Writer; Writer; Writer; Writer; Writer; Writer; Writer; Writer; Writer; Writer; Writer; Writer; Writer; Writer; Writer; Writer; Writer; Writer; Writer; Writer; Writer; Writer; Writer; Writer; Writer; Writer; Writer	Nominated	
2019	—N/a	Michael Che; Colin Jost; Kent Sublette; Bryan Tucker; James Anderson; Steven Castillo; Andrew Dismukes; Anna Drezen; Alison Gates; Steve Higgins; Sam Jay; Erik Kenward; Michael Koman; Alan Linic; Eli Coyote Mandel; Lorne Michaels; John Mulaney; Josh Patten; Simon Rich; Gary Richardson; Pete Schultz; Marika Sawyer; Will Stephen; Julio Torres; Bowen Yang; Megan Callahan; Dennis McNicholas; Katie Rich; Fran Gillespie; Sudi Green; Streeter Seidell	Head Writer; Head Writer; Head Writer; Senior Writer; Writer; Writer; Writer; Writer; Writer; Writer; Writer; Writer; Writer; Writer; Writer; Writer; Writer; Writer; Writer; Writer; Writer; Writer; Writer; Writer; Writer; Weekend Update Writer; Weekend Update Writer; Weekend Update Writer; Writing Supervisor; Writing Supervisor; Writing Supervisor	Nominated	
2021	—N/a	Michael Che; Anna Drezen; Colin Jost; Kent Sublette; Bryan Tucker; Dan Bulla; Steven Castillo; Emma Clark; Alison Gates; Steve Higgins; Sam Jay; Erik Kenward; Dan Licata; Jasmine Pierce; Lorne Michaels; Gary Richardson; Will Stephen; Celeste Yim; Pete Schultz; Megan Callahan-Shah; Mike Lawrence; Dennis McNicholas; Josh Patten; Dave Sirus; Mark Steinbach; Fran Gillespie; Sudi Green; Streeter Seidell	Head Writer; Head Writer; Head Writer; Head Writer; Senior Writer; Writer; Writer; Writer; Writer; Writer; Writer; Writer; Writer; Writer; Writer; Writer; Writer; Writer; Weekend Update Head Writer; Weekend Update Writer; Weekend Update Writer; Weekend Update Writer; Weekend Update Writer; Weekend Update Writer; Weekend Update Writer; Writing Supervisor; Writing Supervisor; Writing Supervisor	Nominated	
2022	—N/a	Michael Che; Alison Gates; Colin Jost; Streeter Seidell; Kent Sublette; Bryan Tucker; Dan Bulla; Steven Castillo; Mike DiCenzo; Billy Domineau; Anna Drezen; Alex English; Martin Herlihy; John Higgins; Steve Higgins; Vanessa Jackson; Erik Kenward; Rob Klein; Tesha Kondrat; Ben Marshall; Lorne Michaels; Jake Nordwind; Jasmine Pierce; Ben Silva; Will Stephen; Celeste Yim; Pete Schultz; Megan Callahan-Shah; Dennis McNicholas; Josh Patten; Mark Steinbach	Head Writer; Head Writer; Head Writer; Head Writer; Head Writer; Senior Writer; Writer; Writer; Writer; Writer; Writer; Writer; Writer; Writer; Writer; Writer; Writer; Writer; Writer; Writer; Writer; Writer; Writer; Writer; Writer; Writer; Weekend Update Head Writer; Weekend Update Writer; Weekend Update Writer; Weekend Update Writer; Weekend Update Writer	Nominated	
2023	—N/a	Alison Gates; Streeter Seidell; Kent Sublette; Bryan Tucker; Rosebud Baker; Dan Bulla; Michael Che; Mike DiCenzo; Alex English; Jimmy Fowlie; Martin Herlihy; John Higgins; Steve Higgins; Vanessa Jackson; Colin Jost; Erik Kenward; Ben Marshall; Lorne Michaels; Jake Nordwind; Ceara O'Sullivan; Clare O'Kane; Ben Silva; Auguste White; Pete Schultz; Megan Callahan-Shah; Dennis McNicholas; Josh Patten; KC Shornima; Gary Richardson; Will Stephen; Celeste Yim	Head Writer; Head Writer; Head Writer; Senior Writer; Writer; Writer; Writer; Writer; Writer; Writer; Writer; Writer; Writer; Writer; Writer; Writer; Writer; Writer; Writer; Writer; Writer; Writer; Writer; Weekend Update Head Writer; Weekend Update Writer; Weekend Update Writer; Weekend Update Writer; Weekend Update Writer; Writing Supervisor; Writing Supervisor; Writing Supervisor	Nominated	
2024	—N/a	Alison Gates; Streeter Seidell; Kent Sublette; Bryan Tucker; Rosebud Baker; Dan Bulla; Steven Castillo; Michael Che; Mike DiCenzo; Alex English; Jimmy Fowlie; Martin Herlihy; John Higgins; Steve Higgins; Vanessa Jackson; Colin Jost; Erik Kenward; Ben Marshall; Dave McCary; Lorne Michaels; Jake Nordwind; Ceara O'Sullivan; Ben Silva; Julio Torres; Asha Ward; Auguste White; Pete Schultz; Megan Callahan-Shah; Dennis McNicholas; Josh Patten; KC Shornima; Gary Richardson; Will Stephen; Celeste Yim	Head Writer; Head Writer; Head Writer; Senior Writer; Writer; Writer; Writer; Writer; Writer; Writer; Writer; Writer; Writer; Writer; Writer; Writer; Writer; Writer; Writer; Writer; Writer; Writer; Writer; Writer; Writer; Writer; Weekend Update Head Writer; Weekend Update Writer; Weekend Update Writer; Weekend Update Writer; Weekend Update Writer; Writing Supervisor; Writing Supervisor; Writing Supervisor	Nominated	
2025	—N/a	Alison Gates; Streeter Seidell; Kent Sublette; Bryan Tucker; Steven Castillo; Michael Che; Mike DiCenzo; Jimmy Fowlie; Martin Herlihy; John Higgins; Steve Higgins; Colin Jost; Erik Kenward; Allie Levitan; Ben Marshall; Lorne Michaels; Jake Nordwind; Ceara O'Sullivan; Moss Perricone; Carl Tart; Asha Ward; Pete Schultz; Rosebud Baker; Megan Callahan-Shah; Dennis McNicholas; Josh Patten; KC Shornima; Dan Bulla; Will Stephen; Auguste White; Celeste Yim	Head Writer; Head Writer; Head Writer; Senior Writer; Writer; Writer; Writer; Writer; Writer; Writer; Writer; Writer; Writer; Writer; Writer; Writer; Writer; Writer; Writer; Writer; Writer; Weekend Update Head Writer; Weekend Update Writer; Weekend Update Writer; Weekend Update Writer; Weekend Update Writer; Weekend Update Writer; Writing Supervisor; Writing Supervisor; Writing Supervisor; Writing Supervisor	Nominated	

=== Outstanding Writing for a Variety Special ===
Year	Title	Individual(s)	Position	Result	Ref.
2011	The Real Women of SNL	Paula Pell; Seth Meyers; Emily Spivey; John Solomon	New Material Writer; New Material Writer; New Material Writer; New Material Writer	Nominated	
2013	Saturday Night Live; Weekend Update Thursday (Part One)	Seth Meyers; Colin Jost; James Anderson; James Downey; Steve Higgins; Zach Kanin; Chris Kelly; Joe Kelly; Erik Kenward; Rob Klein; Lorne Michaels; John Mulaney; Michael Patrick O'Brien; Josh Patten; Sarah Schneider; Pete Schultz; Frank Sebastiano; John Solomon; Kent Sublette; Alex Baze	Head Writer; Head Writer; Writer; Writer; Writer; Writer; Writer; Writer; Writer; Writer; Writer; Writer; Writer; Writer; Writer; Writer; Writer; Writer; Writer; Writer	Nominated	
2015	Saturday Night Live; 40th Anniversary Special	James Anderson; Fred Armisen; Tina Fey; Steve Higgins; Chris Kelly; Erik Kenward; Rob Klein; Seth Meyers; Lorne Michaels; John Mulaney; Paula Pell; Jeff Richmond; Andy Samberg; Akiva Schaffer; Tom Schiller; Sarah Schneider; Marc Shaiman; Michael Shoemaker; Robert Smigel; Emily Spivey; Kent Sublette; Jorma Taccone; Bryan Tucker	Writer; Writer; Writer; Writer; Writer; Writer; Writer; Writer; Writer; Writer; Writer; Writer; Writer; Writer; Writer; Writer; Writer; Writer; Writer; Writer; Writer; Writer; Writer	Nominated	
2025	Saturday Night Live; 50th Anniversary Special	James Anderson; Dan Bulla; Megan Callahan-Shah; Michael Che; Mikey Day; Mike DiCenzo; James Downey; Tina Fey; Jimmy Fowlie; Alison Gates; Sudi Green; Jack Handey; Steve Higgins; Colin Jost; Erik Kenward; Dennis McNicholas; Seth Meyers; Lorne Michaels; John Mulaney; Jake Nordwind; Ceara O'Sullivan; Josh Patten; Paula Pell; Simon Rich; Pete Schultz; Streeter Seidell; Emily Spivey; Kent Sublette; Bryan Tucker; Auguste White	Writer; Writer; Writer; Writer; Writer; Writer; Writer; Writer; Writer; Writer; Writer; Writer; Writer; Writer; Writer; Writer; Writer; Writer; Writer; Writer; Writer; Writer; Writer; Writer; Writer; Writer; Writer; Writer; Writer; Writer	Won	

== Prism Awards ==
Year	Category	Individual(s)	Result	Ref.
2006	Performance in a TV Comedy Series	Jason Lee	Nominated	
2006	Performance in a TV Comedy Series	Amy Poehler	Nominated	
2006	Performance in a TV Comedy Series	Kenan Thompson	Nominated	

== Producers Guild of America Awards ==
Year	Category	Title	Individual(s)	Result	Ref.
2004	Norman Lear Achievement Award in Television	Saturday Night Live	Lorne Michaels	Honored	
2005	Outstanding Producer of Live Entertainment & Talk Television	Saturday Night Live	Lorne Michaels; Steve Higgins; Marci Klein; Michael Shoemaker; Ken Aymong	Nominated	
2013	Outstanding Producer of Live Entertainment & Talk Television	Saturday Night Live	Lorne Michaels; Steve Higgins; Erik Kenward; John Mulaney; Ken Aymong	Nominated	
2014	Outstanding Producer of Live Entertainment & Talk Television	Saturday Night Live	Lorne Michaels; Steve Higgins; Erik Kenward; John Mulaney; Ken Aymong	Nominated	
2017	Outstanding Producer of Live Entertainment & Talk Television	Saturday Night Live	Lorne Michaels; Steve Higgins; Erik Kenward; Lindsay Shookus; Erin Doyle; Ken Aymong	Nominated	
2018	Outstanding Producer of Live Entertainment & Talk Television	Saturday Night Live	Lorne Michaels; Steve Higgins; Erik Kenward; Lindsay Shookus; Erin Doyle; Tom Broecker; Ken Aymong	Nominated	
2019	Outstanding Producer of Live Entertainment & Talk Television	Saturday Night Live	Lorne Michaels; Steve Higgins; Erik Kenward; Lindsay Shookus; Erin Doyle; Tom Broecker; Ken Aymong	Nominated	
2020	Outstanding Producer of Live Entertainment & Talk Television	Saturday Night Live	Lorne Michaels; Steve Higgins; Erik Kenward; Lindsay Shookus; Erin Doyle; Tom Broecker; Ken Aymong	Nominated	
2021	Outstanding Producer of Live Entertainment & Talk Television	Saturday Night Live	Lorne Michaels; Steve Higgins; Erik Kenward; Lindsay Shookus; Erin Doyle; Tom Broecker; Caroline Maroney; Ken Aymong	Nominated	
2021	Outstanding Short-Form Program	Saturday Night Live	—N/a	Nominated	
2022	Outstanding Producer of Live Entertainment, Variety, Sketch, Standup & Talk Television	Saturday Night Live	—N/a	Nominated	
2022	Outstanding Short-Form Program	Saturday Night Live	—N/a	Nominated	
2023	Outstanding Producer of Live Entertainment, Variety, Sketch, Standup & Talk Television	Saturday Night Live	—N/a	Nominated	
2024	Outstanding Producer of Live Entertainment, Variety, Sketch, Standup & Talk Television	Saturday Night Live	—N/a	Nominated	
2025	Outstanding Producer of Live Entertainment, Variety, Sketch, Standup & Talk Television	Saturday Night Live	Lorne Michaels; Steve Higgins; Erik Kenward; Erin Doyle; Tom Broecker; Caroline Maroney; Javier Winnik	Won	
2026	Outstanding Producer of Non-Fiction Television	SNL50: Beyond Saturday Night	Morgan Neville; Caitrin Rogers; Juaquin Cambron; Jonathan Formica; Allison Klein; Nora Chute	Nominated	
2026	Outstanding Producer of Live Entertainment, Variety, Sketch, Standup & Talk Television	Saturday Night Live 50th Anniversary Special	Lorne Michaels; Steve Higgins; Erik Kenward; Erin Doyle; Tom Broecker; Caroline Maroney; Colin Jost; Michael Che; Javier Winnik	Nominated	

== Satellite Awards ==
Year	Category	Individual(s)	Result	Ref.
2005	Best Actress in a Series – Comedy or Musical	Maya Rudolph	Nominated	

== Saturn Awards ==
Year	Category	Nominee(s)	Result	Ref.
2007	Best Retro Television Series on DVD	The Complete First Season	Nominated	

== Set Decorators Society of America Awards ==
Year	Category	Individual(s)	Position	Result	Ref.
2021	Best Achievement in Décor/Design of a Variety, Reality or Competition Series	Carol Silverman; Kimberly Kachougian; Danielle Webb; Keith Raywood; Eugene Lee; Leo Yoshimura; N. Joseph Detullio	Set Decorator (Film Unit); Set Decorator (Film Unit); Set Decorator (Film Unit); Production Designer; Production Designer; Production Designer; Production Designer	Won	
2022	Best Achievement in Décor/Design of a Variety, Reality or Competition Series	Kimberly Kachougian; Danielle Webb; Kimberley Fischer; Jessica Templin King; Eugene Lee; Keith Raywood; Akira Yoshimura; Joe Detullio; Andrea Purcigliotti; Ken MacLeod; Mark Newell	Set Decorator; Set Decorator; Set Decorator; Set Decorator; Production Designer; Production Designer; Production Designer; Production Designer; Production Designer; Production Designer; Production Designer	Nominated	
2025	Best Achievement in Décor/Design of a Variety, Reality or Competition Series or Special	Kimberly Kachougian; Danielle Webb; Sara Parks; Kimberley Fischer; Jessica Templin King; Andrea Purcigliotti; Kenneth MacLeod; Mark Newell	Set Decorator; Set Decorator; Set Decorator; Set Decorator; Set Decorator; Production Designer; Production Designer; Production Designer	Won	
2026	Best Achievement in Décor/Design of a Variety, Reality or Competition Series or Special	Kimberly Kachougian; Danielle Webb; Sara Parks; Jessica Templin King; Andrea Purcigliotti; Kenneth MacLeod	Set Decorator; Set Decorator; Set Decorator; Set Decorator; Production Designer; Production Designer	Nominated	

== Teen Choice Awards ==
Year	Category	Individual(s)	Result	Ref.
2000	Choice TV Personality	Chris Kattan	Nominated	
2001	Choice Late Night TV Show	Saturday Night Live	Won	
2001	Choice TV Personality	Jimmy Fallon	Nominated	
2003	Choice TV Late Night	Saturday Night Live	Won	
2004	Choice TV Late Night	Saturday Night Live	Won	

== Television Critics Association Awards ==
Year	Category	Nominee(s)	Result	Ref.
2002	Heritage Award	Saturday Night Live	Nominated	
2003	Heritage Award	Saturday Night Live	Nominated	
2004	Heritage Award	Saturday Night Live	Nominated	
2005	Heritage Award	Saturday Night Live	Nominated	
2008	Heritage Award	Saturday Night Live	Nominated	
2009	Program of the Year	Saturday Night Live	Nominated	
2009	Heritage Award	Saturday Night Live	Nominated	
2012	Heritage Award	Saturday Night Live	Nominated	
2013	Heritage Award	Saturday Night Live	Nominated	
2014	Heritage Award	Saturday Night Live	Won	
2018	Outstanding Achievement in Sketch/Variety Shows	Saturday Night Live	Nominated	
2020	Outstanding Achievement in Sketch/Variety Shows	Saturday Night Live	Nominated	
2021	Outstanding Achievement in Variety, Talk or Sketch	Saturday Night Live	Nominated	
2022	Outstanding Achievement in Variety, Talk or Sketch	Saturday Night Live	Nominated	
2023	Outstanding Achievement in Variety, Talk or Sketch	Saturday Night Live	Nominated	
2024	Outstanding Achievement in Variety, Talk or Sketch	Saturday Night Live	Nominated	
2025	Outstanding Achievement in Variety, Talk or Sketch	Saturday Night Live	Nominated	
2025	Outstanding Achievement in Variety, Talk or Sketch	Saturday Night Live 50th Anniversary Special	Won	
2026	Outstanding Achievement in Variety, Talk or Sketch	Saturday Night Live	Nominated	

== TV Guide Awards ==
Year	Category	Individual(s)	Result	Ref.
1999	Favorite Late Night Show	Saturday Night Live	Nominated	
2000	Favorite Late Night Show	Saturday Night Live	Nominated	
2001	Breakout Star of the Year	Will Ferrell; Darrell Hammond	Nominated	

== TV Land Awards ==
Year	Category	Individual(s)	Position	Result	Ref.
2007	Fake Product You Want to Buy	"Super Bass-o-Matic '76"	—N/a	Nominated	
2007	Favorite Elvis Impersonation	Dan Aykroyd	Performer	Nominated	
2007	Favorite Elvis Impersonation	John Belushi	Performer	Nominated	
2007	Favorite Elvis Impersonation	Andy Kaufman	Performer	Nominated	
2008	Most Memorable SNL Musical Guest	Elvis Costello	Performer	Nominated	
2008	Most Memorable SNL Musical Guest	Sinéad O'Connor	Performer	Nominated	
2008	Most Memorable SNL Musical Guest	Leon Redbone	Performer	Nominated	
2008	Most Memorable SNL Musical Guest	Paul Simon; Art Garfunkel	Performer; Performer	Won	

== Webby Awards ==
Year	Category	Recipient(s)	Result	Ref.
2007	Websites – Television & Film	NBC	Nominated	

== Writers Guild of America Awards ==
Year	Category	Title	Individual(s)	Position	Result	Ref.
2001	Comedy/Variety (Music, Awards, Tributes) – Specials	Saturday Night Live 25th Anniversary Special	Tina Fey; Anne Beatts; Tom Davis; Steve Higgins; Lorne Michaels; Marilyn Suzanne Miller; Paula Pell; Paul Shaffer; T. Sean Shannon; Michael Shoemaker; Robert Smigel	Head Writer; Writer; Writer; Writer; Writer; Writer; Writer; Writer; Writer; Writer; Writer	Won	
2001	Comedy/Variety Series	Saturday Night Live	Tina Fey; Dennis McNicholas; James Anderson; Robert Carlock; Jerry Collins; Tony Daro; James Downey; Hugh Fink; Melanie Graham; Tim Herlihy; Steve Higgins; Erik Kenward; Adam McKay; Lorne Michaels; Jerry Minor; Matt Murray; Paula Pell; Matt Piedmont; Jon Rosenfeld; Michael Schur; T. Sean Shannon; Robert Smigel; Andrew Steele; Scott Wainio	Head Writer; Head Writer; Writer; Writer; Writer; Writer; Writer; Writer; Writer; Writer; Writer; Writer; Writer; Writer; Writer; Writer; Writer; Writer; Writer; Writer; Writer; Writer; Writer; Writer	Nominated	
2002	Comedy/Variety Series	Saturday Night Live	Tina Fey; Dennis McNicholas; Doug Abeles; James Anderson; Max Brooks; James Downey; Hugh Fink; Charlie Grandy; Steve Higgins; Erik Kenward; Lorne Michaels; Matt Murray; Paula Pell; Matt Piedmont; Ken Scarborough; Michael Schur; Frank Sebastiano; T. Sean Shannon; Eric Slovin; Robert Smigel; Emily Spivey; Andrew Steele; Scott Wainio	Head Writer; Head Writer; Writer; Writer; Writer; Writer; Writer; Writer; Writer; Writer; Writer; Writer; Writer; Writer; Writer; Writer; Writer; Writer; Writer; Writer; Writer; Writer; Writer	Nominated	
2003	Comedy/Variety Series	Saturday Night Live	Tina Fey; Dennis McNicholas; Doug Abeles; Leo Allen; James Anderson; Max Brooks; Tom David; James Downey; James Eagan; Al Franken; Kristin Gore; Charlie Grandy; Steve Higgins; Erik Kenward; Lorne Michaels; Corwin Moore; Matt Murray; Paula Pell; Ken Scarborough; Michael Schur; Frank Sebastiano; T. Sean Shannon; Eric Slovin; Robert Smigel; Emily Spivey; Andrew Steele; Scott Wainio	Head Writer; Head Writer; Writer; Writer; Writer; Writer; Writer; Writer; Writer; Writer; Writer; Writer; Writer; Writer; Writer; Writer; Writer; Writer; Writer; Writer; Writer; Writer; Writer; Writer; Writer; Writer; Writer	Nominated	
2007	Comedy/Variety Series	Saturday Night Live	Tina Fey; Seth Meyers; Andrew Steele; Doug Abeles; James Anderson; Alex Baze; Liz Cackowski; James Downey; Charlie Grandy; Steve Higgins; Colin Jost; Erik Kenward; John Lutz; Lorne Michaels; Matt Murray; Paula Pell; Akiva Schaffer; Frank Sebastiano; T. Sean Shannon; Robert Smigel; J. B. Smoove; Emily Spivey; Jorma Taccone; Bryan Tucker; Mike Schwartz; Kristin Gore	Head Writer; Head Writer; Head Writer; Writer; Writer; Writer; Writer; Writer; Writer; Writer; Writer; Writer; Writer; Writer; Writer; Writer; Writer; Writer; Writer; Writer; Writer; Writer; Writer; Writer; Additional Sketch Writer; Additional Sketch Writer	Won	
2009	Comedy/Variety Series	Saturday Night Live	Seth Meyers; Paula Pell; Andrew Steele; Doug Abeles; James Anderson; Alex Baze; Jessica Conrad; James Downey; Steve Higgins; Colin Jost; Erik Kenward; Rob Klein; John Lutz; Lorne Michaels; John Mulaney; Simon Rich; Marika Sawyer; Akiva Schaffer; John Solomon; Emily Spivey; Kent Sublette; Jorma Taccone; Bryan Tucker; Robert Carlock	Head Writer; Head Writer; Head Writer; Writer; Writer; Writer; Writer; Writer; Writer; Writer; Writer; Writer; Writer; Writer; Writer; Writer; Writer; Writer; Writer; Writer; Writer; Writer; Writer; Additional Sketches	Won	
2010	Comedy/Variety Series	Saturday Night Live	Seth Meyers; Doug Abeles; James Anderson; Alex Baze; Jessica Conrad; James Downey; Steve Higgins; Colin Jost; Erik Kenward; Rob Klein; John Lutz; Lorne Michaels; John Mulaney; Paula Pell; Simon Rich; Marika Sawyer; Akiva Schaffer; John Solomon; Emily Spivey; Kent Sublette; Jorma Taccone; Bryan Tucker; Adam McKay; Andrew Steele	Head Writer; Writer; Writer; Writer; Writer; Writer; Writer; Writer; Writer; Writer; Writer; Writer; Writer; Writer; Writer; Writer; Writer; Writer; Writer; Writer; Writer; Writer; Additional Sketches; Additional Sketches	Won	
2011	Comedy/Variety Series	Saturday Night Live	Seth Meyers; Doug Abeles; James Anderson; Alex Baze; Jillian Bell; Hannibal Buress; Jessica Conrad; James Downey; Steve Higgins; Colin Jost; Erik Kenward; Rob Klein; John Lutz; Seth Meyers; Lorne Michaels; John Mulaney; Christine Nangle; Michael Patrick O'Brien; Paula Pell; Ryan Perez; Simon Rich; Marika Sawyer; Akiva Schaffer; John Solomon; Emily Spivey; Kent Sublette; Jorma Taccone; Bryan Tucker	Head Writer; Writer; Writer; Writer; Writer; Writer; Writer; Writer; Writer; Writer; Writer; Writer; Writer; Writer; Writer; Writer; Writer; Writer; Writer; Writer; Writer; Writer; Writer; Writer; Writer; Writer; Writer; Writer	Nominated	
2012	Comedy/Variety Series	Saturday Night Live	Seth Meyers; Doug Abeles; James Anderson; Alex Baze; Heather Anne Campbell; Matt Craig; Jessica Conrad; James Downey; Tom Flanigan; Shelly Gossman; Steve Higgins; Colin Jost; Zach Kanin; Chris Kelly; Erik Kenward; Rob Klein; John Lutz; Jonathan Krisel; Lorne Michaels; John Mulaney; Christine Nangle; Michael Patrick O'Brien; Paula Pell; Simon Rich; Marika Sawyer; Akiva Schaffer; Sarah Schneider; Pete Schultz; John Solomon; Kent Sublette; Jorma Taccone; Bryan Tucker	Head Writer; Writer; Writer; Writer; Writer; Writer; Writer; Writer; Writer; Writer; Writer; Writer; Writer; Writer; Writer; Writer; Writer; Writer; Writer; Writer; Writer; Writer; Writer; Writer; Writer; Writer; Writer; Writer; Writer; Writer; Writer; Writer	Nominated	
2013	Comedy/Variety Series	Saturday Night Live	Seth Meyers; James Anderson; Alex Baze; Neil Casey; Jessica Conrad; James Downey; Shelly Gossman; Steve Higgins; Colin Jost; Zach Kanin; Chris Kelly; Joe Kelly; Erik Kenward; Rob Klein; John Lutz; Lorne Michaels; John Mulaney; Christine Nangle; Michael Patrick O'Brien; Josh Patten; Paula Pell; Marika Sawyer; Akiva Schaffer; Sarah Schneider; Pete Schultz; Frank Sebastiano; John Solomon; Emily Spivey; Kent Sublette; Jorma Taccone; Bryan Tucker	Head Writer; Writer; Writer; Writer; Writer; Writer; Writer; Writer; Writer; Writer; Writer; Writer; Writer; Writer; Writer; Writer; Writer; Writer; Writer; Writer; Writer; Writer; Writer; Writer; Writer; Writer; Writer; Writer; Writer; Writer; Writer	Nominated	
2014	Comedy/Variety Series	Saturday Night Live	Seth Meyers; Colin Jost; James Anderson; Alex Baze; Neil Casey; James Downey; Steve Higgins; Zach Kanin; Chris Kelly; Joe Kelly; Erik Kenward; Rob Klein; Lorne Michaels; John Mulaney; Michael Patrick O'Brien; Josh Patten; Paula Pell; Marika Sawyer; Sarah Schneider; Pete Schultz; John Solomon; Kent Sublette; Bryan Tucker	Head Writer; Head Writer; Writer; Writer; Writer; Writer; Writer; Writer; Writer; Writer; Writer; Writer; Writer; Writer; Writer; Writer; Writer; Writer; Writer; Writer; Writer; Writer; Writer	Nominated	
2015	Comedy/Variety (Including Talk) – Series	Saturday Night Live	Seth Meyers; Colin Jost; Rob Klein; Bryan Tucker; James Anderson; Alex Baze; Michael Che; Mikey Day; Steve Higgins; Leslie Jones; Zach Kanin; Chris Kelly; Erik Kenward; Lorne Michaels; Claire Mulaney; Josh Patten; Paula Pell; Katie Rich; Tim Robinson; Sarah Schneider; Pete Schultz; John Solomon; Kent Sublette; Lakendra Tookes	Head Writer; Head Writer; Head Writer; Head Writer; Writer; Writer; Writer; Writer; Writer; Writer; Writer; Writer; Writer; Writer; Writer; Writer; Writer; Writer; Writer; Writer; Writer; Writer; Writer; Writer	Nominated	
2016	Comedy/Variety – Sketch Series	Saturday Night Live	Colin Jost; Rob Klein; Bryan Tucker; James Anderson; Jeremy Beiler; Megan Callahan; Michael Che; Mikey Day; Steve Higgins; Zach Kanin; Chris Kelly; Erik Kenward; Dave McCary; Dennis McNicholas; Lorne Michaels; Claire Mulaney; Mike O’Brien; Josh Patten; Alison Rich; Katie Rich; Tim Robinson; Natasha Rothwell; Nick Rutherford; Meredith Scardino; Sarah Schneider; Pete Schultz; Streeter Seidell; John Solomon; Kent Sublette	Head Writer; Head Writer; Head Writer; Writer; Writer; Writer; Writer; Writer; Writer; Writer; Writer; Writer; Writer; Writer; Writer; Writer; Writer; Writer; Writer; Writer; Writer; Writer; Writer; Writer; Writer; Writer; Writer; Writer; Writer	Nominated	
2016	Comedy/Variety – Specials	Saturday Night Live 40th Anniversary Special	James Anderson; Fred Armisen; Tina Fey; Steve Higgins; Chris Kelly; Erik Kenward; Rob Klein; Seth Meyers; Lorne Michaels; John Mulaney; Paula Pell; Andy Samberg; Akiva Schaffer; Tom Schiller; Sarah Schneider; Marc Shaiman; Michael Shoemaker; Robert Smigel; Emily Spivey; Kent Sublette; Jorma Taccone; Bryan Tucker	Writer; Writer; Writer; Writer; Writer; Writer; Writer; Writer; Writer; Writer; Writer; Writer; Writer; Writer; Writer; Writer; Writer; Writer; Writer; Writer; Writer; Writer	Nominated	
2017	Comedy/Variety – Sketch Series	Saturday Night Live	Rob Klein; Bryan Tucker; James Anderson; Fred Armisen; Jeremy Beiler; Chris Belair; Megan Callahan; Michael Che; Mikey Day; Jim Downey; Tina Fey; Fran Gillespie; Sudi Green; Tim Herlihy; Steve Higgins; Colin Jost; Zach Kanin; Chris Kelly; Erik Kenward; Paul Masella; Dave McCary; Dennis McNicholas; Seth Meyers; Lorne Michaels; Josh Patten; Paula Pell; Katie Rich; Tim Robinson; Sarah Schneider; Pete Schultz; Streeter Seidell; Dave Sirus; Emily Spivey; Andrew Steele; Will Stephen; Kent Sublette	Head Writer; Head Writer; Writer; Writer; Writer; Writer; Writer; Writer; Writer; Writer; Writer; Writer; Writer; Writer; Writer; Writer; Writer; Writer; Writer; Writer; Writer; Writer; Writer; Writer; Writer; Writer; Writer; Writer; Writer; Writer; Writer; Writer; Writer; Writer; Writer; Writer	Won	
2018	Comedy/Variety – Sketch Series	Saturday Night Live	Michael Che; Colin Jost; Kent Sublette; Bryan Tucker; Fran Gillespie; Sudi Green; Streeter Seidell; James Anderson; Kristen Bartlett; Megan Callahan; Steve Castillo; Andrew Dismukes; Anna Drezen; Claire Friedman; Alison Gates; Steve Higgins; Sam Jay; Erik Kenward; Rob Klein; Nick Kocher; Michael Koman; Alan Linic; Eli Coyote Mandal; Erik Marino; Dave McCary; Brian McElhaney; Dennis McNicholas; Lorne Michaels; Nimesh Patel; Josh Patten; Katie Rich; Simon Rich; Gary Richardson; Marika Sawyer; Pete Schultz; Mitch Silpa; Will Stephen; Julio Torres; Bowen Yang	Head Writer; Head Writer; Head Writer; Head Writer; Supervising Writer; Supervising Writer; Supervising Writer; Writer; Writer; Writer; Writer; Writer; Writer; Writer; Writer; Writer; Writer; Writer; Writer; Writer; Writer; Writer; Writer; Writer; Writer; Writer; Writer; Writer; Writer; Writer; Writer; Writer; Writer; Writer; Writer; Writer; Writer; Writer; Writer	Won	
2019	Comedy/Variety – Sketch Series	Saturday Night Live	Michael Che; Colin Jost; Kent Sublette; Anna Drezen; Fran Gillespie; Sudi Green; Streeter Seidell; Bryan Tucker; Pete Schultz; James Anderson; Neal Brennan; Andrew Briedis; Megan Callahan; Steve Castillo; Emma Clark; Andrew Dismukes; Alison Gates; Tim Herlihy; Steve Higgins; Sam Jay; Erik Kenward; Steve Koren; Rob Klein; Michael Koman; Dan Licata; Alan Linic; Eli Coyote Mandal; Dave McCary; Dennis McNicholas; Lorne Michaels; John Mulaney; Jasmin Pierce; Josh Patten; Katie Rich; Simon Rich; Gary Richardson; Marika Sawyer; Robert Smigel; Mark Steinbach; Will Stephen; Julio Torres; Bowen Yang	Head Writer; Head Writer; Head Writer; Supervising Writer; Supervising Writer; Supervising Writer; Supervising Writer; Senior Writer; Weekend Update Head Writer; Writer; Writer; Writer; Writer; Writer; Writer; Writer; Writer; Writer; Writer; Writer; Writer; Writer; Writer; Writer; Writer; Writer; Writer; Writer; Writer; Writer; Writer; Writer; Writer; Writer; Writer; Writer; Writer; Writer; Writer; Writer; Writer; Writer	Nominated	
2022	Comedy/Variety – Sketch Series	Saturday Night Live	Michael Che; Anna Drezen; Colin Jost; Kent Sublette; Bryan Tucker; Pete Schultz; Megan Callahan-Shah; Dennis McNicholas; Josh Patten; Mark Steinbach; Alison Gates; Fran Gillespie; Sudi Green; Streeter Seidell; James Anderson; Dan Bulla; Steve Castillo; Mike DiCenzo; Billy Domineau; Alex English; John Higgins; Steve Higgins; Martin Herlihy; Vannessa Jackson; Sam Jay; Erik Kenward; Tesha Kondrat; Dan Licata; Lorne Michaels; Ben Marshall; Jake Nordwind; Jasmin Pierce; Gary Richardson; Ben Silva; Emily Spivey; Will Stephen; Celeste Yim	Head Writer; Head Writer; Head Writer; Head Writer; Senior Writer; Weekend Update Head Writer; Weekend Update Writer; Weekend Update Writer; Weekend Update Writer; Weekend Update Writer; Supervising Writer; Supervising Writer; Supervising Writer; Supervising Writer; Writer; Writer; Writer; Writer; Writer; Writer; Writer; Writer; Writer; Writer; Writer; Writer; Writer; Writer; Writer; Writer; Writer; Writer; Writer; Writer; Writer; Writer; Writer	Nominated	
2023	Comedy/Variety – Sketch Series	Saturday Night Live	Michael Che; Alison Gates; Colin Jost; Streeter Seidell; Kent Sublette; Bryan Tucker; Pete Schultz; Megan Callahan-Shah; Dennis McNicholas; Josh Patten; KC Shornima; Mark Steinbach; James Anderson; Rosebud Baker; Dan Bulla; Mike DiCenzo; Billy Domineau; James Downey; Alex English; Jimmy Fowlie; Martin Herlihy; John Higgins; Steve Higgins; Vannessa Jackson; Erik Kenward; Tesha Kondrat; Ben Marshall; Lorne Michaels; Jake Nordwind; Clare O'Kane; Ceara O'Sullivan; Simon Rich; Ben Silva; John Solomon; Will Stephen; Nicole Sun; Auguste White; Celeste Yim	Head Writer; Head Writer; Head Writer; Head Writer; Head Writer; Senior Writer; Weekend Update Head Writer; Weekend Update Writer; Weekend Update Writer; Weekend Update Writer; Weekend Update Writer; Weekend Update Writer; Writer; Writer; Writer; Writer; Writer; Writer; Writer; Writer; Writer; Writer; Writer; Writer; Writer; Writer; Writer; Writer; Writer; Writer; Writer; Writer; Writer; Writer; Writer; Writer; Writer; Writer	Nominated	
2024	Comedy/Variety – Sketch Series	Saturday Night Live	Alison Gates; Streeter Seidell; Kent Sublette; Rosebud Baker; Dan Bulla; Megan Callahan-Shah; Michael Che; Mike DiCenzo; Alex English; Jimmy Fowlie; Martin Herlihy; John Higgins; Steve Higgins; Vannessa Jackson; Colin Jost; Erik Kenward; Steve Koren; Ben Marshall; Dennis McNicholas; Lorne Michaels; Jake Nordwind; Ceara O'Sullivan; Josh Patten; Gary Richardson; Pete Schultz; KC Shornima; Ben Silva; Will Stephen; Bryan Tucker; Asha Ward; Auguste White; Celeste Yim	Head Writer; Head Writer; Head Writer; Writer; Writer; Writer; Writer; Writer; Writer; Writer; Writer; Writer; Writer; Writer; Writer; Writer; Writer; Writer; Writer; Writer; Writer; Writer; Writer; Writer; Writer; Writer; Writer; Writer; Writer; Writer; Writer; Writer	Nominated	
2025	Comedy/Variety – Talk or Sketch Series	Saturday Night Live	Alison Gates; Streeter Seidell; Kent Sublette; Rosebud Baker; Dan Bulla; Megan Callahan-Shah; Steven Castillo; Michael Che; Mike DiCenzo; Alex English; Jimmy Fowlie; Martin Herlihy; John Higgins; Steve Higgins; Vannessa Jackson; Colin Jost; Erik Kenward; Ben Marshall; Dennis McNicholas; Lorne Michaels; Jake Nordwind; Ceara O'Sullivan; Josh Patten; Gary Richardson; Pete Schultz; KC Shornima; Will Stephen; Bryan Tucker; Asha Ward; Auguste White; Celeste Yim	Head Writer; Head Writer; Head Writer; Writer; Writer; Writer; Writer; Writer; Writer; Writer; Writer; Writer; Writer; Writer; Writer; Writer; Writer; Writer; Writer; Writer; Writer; Writer; Writer; Writer; Writer; Writer; Writer; Writer; Writer; Writer; Writer	Nominated	
2026	Comedy/Variety – Talk or Sketch	Saturday Night Live	Alison Gates; Erik Kenward; Streeter Seidell; Kent Sublette; Bryan Tucker; Pete Schultz; Rosebud Baker; Megan Callahan-Shah; Dennis McNicholas; Josh Patten; KC Shornima; Dan Bulla; Will Stephen; Auguste White; Celeste Yim; Steven Castillo; Michael Che; Mike DiCenzo; Jimmy Fowlie; Sudi Green; Martin Herlihy; John Higgins; Steve Higgins; Colin Jost; Allie Levitan; Ben Marshall; Lorne Michaels; Jake Nordwind; Ceara O'Sullivan; Moss Perricone; Carl Tart; Asha Ward	Head Writer; Head Writer; Head Writer; Head Writer; Senior Writer; Weekend Update Head Writer; Weekend Update Writer; Weekend Update Writer; Weekend Update Writer; Weekend Update Writer; Weekend Update Writer; Supervising Writer; Supervising Writer; Supervising Writer; Supervising Writer; Writer; Writer; Writer; Writer; Writer; Writer; Writer; Writer; Writer; Writer; Writer; Writer; Writer; Writer; Writer; Writer; Writer	Nominated	
2026	Comedy/Variety – Specials	Saturday Night Live 50th Anniversary Special	James Anderson; Dan Bulla; Megan Callahan-Shah; Michael Che; Mikey Day; Mike DiCenzo; James Downey; Tina Fey; Jimmy Fowlie; Alison Gates; Sudi Green; Jack Handey; Steve Higgins; Colin Jost; Erik Kenward; Dennis McNicholas; Seth Meyers; Lorne Michaels; John Mulaney; Jake Nordwind; Ceara O'Sullivan; Josh Patten; Paula Pell; Simon Rich; Pete Schultz; Streeter Seidell; Emily Spivey; Kent Sublette; Bryan Tucker; Auguste White	Writer; Writer; Writer; Writer; Writer; Writer; Writer; Writer; Writer; Writer; Writer; Writer; Writer; Writer; Writer; Writer; Writer; Writer; Writer; Writer; Writer; Writer; Writer; Writer; Writer; Writer; Writer; Writer; Writer; Writer	Nominated	
