= Recurring Saturday Night Live characters and sketches introduced 2010–11 =

The following is a list of recurring Saturday Night Live characters and sketches introduced between September 25, 2010, and May 21, 2011, the thirty-sixth season of SNL.

== The Miley Cyrus Show ==
Vanessa Bayer plays teen Disney Channel star Miley Cyrus as the exuberant host of her own talk show. (Theme song: "I've got guests, and a show, and I'm ready to go! So I guess that's pretty cool! It's pretty cool!") Bryan Cranston played her father and house band leader Billy Ray Cyrus in the sketch's debut; he was replaced by Jason Sudeikis in later installments.

Bayer performed her impression of Cyrus during her auditions for SNL. She said in a 2011 interview that when fans recognize her, Cyrus is the character they most often mention.

Cyrus asking her guests extremely long, compounded questions is a recurring element of the sketch. (For example, to Katie Holmes (Anne Hathaway): "Like, how did you transition into doing more adult roles, and, like, what's the sexiest role you've ever done, and, like, how many boys have you kissed on screen, and, like, who's your best friend, and, like, who's Tom Cruise's best friend, and why does your baby wear high heels, and what does Jesus think of Scientology?") According to Bayer, the questions tend to change throughout the process from writing through rehearsal to the live performance. "That run is one of those things that is always changing up until the show. We'll take out one of the questions that didn't get a laugh and put a new one in."

Bayer and Cyrus first met in person when Cyrus hosted the March 5, 2011, episode of SNL. Cyrus described their meeting:

I said, "You play me on TV!" And she said, "Yeah, I do." And I was like, "Oh, well that’s pretty cool." And she goes, "What?" And I was like, "Oh my God, I sound like you doing me!"

Appearances

Season	Episode	Host	Notes
36	October 2, 2010	Bryan Cranston	Cranston appears as Billy Ray Cyrus. Paul Brittain appears as Johnny Depp. Miley shows a clip from her "really dramatic" movie, Goodbye, Jeff (featuring Andy Samberg).
36	November 20, 2010	Anne Hathaway	Hathaway appears as Katie Holmes. Miley announces she's sexy now, and shows her screen test to play Batman's girlfriend in the next Batman film (featuring Samberg).
36	December 18, 2010	Jeff Bridges	Bridges appears as Nick Nolte.
36	March 5, 2011	Miley Cyrus	The real Miley Cyrus appears as Justin Bieber. Miley shows a home video of herself as an "already super talented" infant.
37	December 3, 2011	Steve Buscemi	Buscemi appears as Jeff, whom Miley met at Burning Man. Maya Rudolph makes a cameo as Whitney Houston.
38	February 9, 2013	Justin Bieber	Justin Bieber plays the president of the Miley Cyrus fan club.

== Les Jeunes de Paris ==
A French TV series about angry teens who break into dance to express their emotions and act out melodramatic plotlines. Taran Killam stars as François.

Killam co-wrote the first version of the sketch while working with The Groundlings, after being inspired by the Camille song "Ta Douleur": "We just were looking for a reason to dance around, really...It’s sort of just our exaggerated portrayal of our American interpretation of French youth culture, inspired by the song." He credits Emma Stone's support for making the sketch Killam's first written work to be performed on SNL.

SNL writer Rob Klein helped Killam with the "structure" needed to make "Les Jeunes de Paris" a recurring sketch. Following its second appearance, Killam said:

The action of the sketch is whatever the tone of the song I chose inspires. "Tékitoi?" [the Rachid Taha song used in the second sketch] has got some of that combative energy because of the two voices going back and forth, so I wanted to involve some sort of love triangle in the plot. But it just becomes about how many times people can throw water in my face. It’s just really fun to do, to get as much of the cast involved to jump around and look like idiots.

Appearances

Season	Episode	Host	Song Used	Notes
36	October 23, 2010	Emma Stone	"Ta Douleur" by Camille	François flirts with a French girl (Stone).
36	March 5, 2011	Miley Cyrus	"Tekitoi" by Rachid Taha	Two girls (Cyrus and Nasim Pedrad) fight over François' affections.
37	November 12, 2011	Emma Stone	"A cause des garçons" by Yelle	As François' lover Juliette (Stone) prepares to leave him, he convinces her, with a heartfelt dance, to reconsider; in the course of the dance, they are married (by Napoleon) and Juliette gives birth. The Tour de France and The Hunchback of Notre-Dame also make appearances.
37	February 11, 2012	Zooey Deschanel	"Peppy and George" by The Brussels Philharmonic & The Orchestra of Flanders	François competes with Jean Dujardin for the love of a girl (Deschanel), in a black-and-white spoof of The Artist.
39	April 5, 2014	Anna Kendrick	"Louxor J'adore" by Katerine	François meets a new girl (Kendrick).

== "Sex" Ed Vincent ==
Paul Brittain plays a creepy sex ed teacher.

Appearances

Season	Episode	Host	Notes
36	October 23, 2010	Emma Stone	
37	December 3, 2011	Steve Buscemi	

== Laura Parsons ==
Vanessa Bayer plays impassioned child actress Laura Parsons, who may have more energy and volume than actual talent.

Season	Episode	Host	Notes
36	November 13, 2010	Scarlett Johansson	Laura and rival actress Amanda Starr (Johansson) perform monologues from films such as Brokeback Mountain.
39	November 16, 2013	Lady Gaga	In a commercial for Spotlightz! Camp for Serious Child Actors, Laura and other child actors perform scenes from Academy Award-winning films such as Forrest Gump.
39	March 1, 2014	Jim Parsons	In another commercial for Spotlightz!, Laura and other child actors perform scenes from 2014 Academy Award-nominated films such as Dallas Buyers Club.
41	November 21, 2015	Matthew McConaughey	
41	January 16, 2016	Adam Driver	
41	May 7, 2016	Brie Larson	
42	October 16, 2016	Emily Blunt	Laura dishes on Donald Trump and Billy Bush's 2005 Access Hollywood backstage conversation.
42	March 4, 2017	Octavia Spencer	

== The Essentials with Robert Osborne ==
As the Turner Classic Movies host Robert Osborne, Jason Sudeikis introduces "a look back" at classic and not-so-classic films.

Appearances

Season	Episode	Host	Notes
36	November 20, 2010	Anne Hathaway	Deleted scenes from The Wizard of Oz featuring a new character, The Weather Vane (Armisen). Hathaway appears as Dorothy Gale.
36	January 29, 2011	Jesse Eisenberg	Scenes from the blaxploitation horror film "The Bride of Blackenstein". Eisenberg appears as Igor. Musical guest Nicki Minaj appears as the titular Bride.
36	March 5, 2011	Miley Cyrus	Deleted scenes from The Sound of Music featuring an excised character played by Hispanic comedian Richie Inez Jr. (Fred Armisen). Cyrus appears as Liesl Von Trapp.
37	October 1, 2011	Melissa McCarthy	McCarthy appears in a series of clips as 1930s actress Lulu Diamonds, an extremely klutzy version of Mae West.
37	May 5, 2012	Eli Manning	Manning appears in a series of clips as Richard Armstrong, an uptight nerd starring alongside the titular heroes of the Cheech & Chong films (Fred Armisen plays Cheech Marin, while Bill Hader plays Tommy Chong).

== Visiting the Queen ==
Fred Armisen and Bill Hader play Queen Elizabeth and Prince Philip, and reveal themselves in private to be rude, nasty bullies with Cockney accents.

Appearances

Season	Episode	Host	Notes
36	November 20, 2010	Anne Hathaway	Following the engagement of Prince William to Kate Middleton, the Queen and Prince threaten Kate (Hathaway) that she'd better follow their rules if she wants to be part of the royal family.
36	April 2, 2011	Elton John	The Queen and Prince pressure John (as himself) to play at William's upcoming wedding.
37	December 10, 2011	Katy Perry	The Queen and Prince harangue Kate (Abby Elliott) for not being pregnant yet, but they take a liking to her more reckless younger sister Pippa (Perry).

== Herb Welch ==
Bill Hader plays an elderly, hard-of-hearing, and cantankerous reporter who interacts antagonistically with anchors Jack Rizzoli, Wanda Ramirez, and most interviewees. Welch's questions to interviewees usually contain racist or misogynistic undertones. Segments feature Welch striking interview subjects with his microphone or attempting to end the segment early with a largely irrelevant or incorrect summation. In one instance, Welch states, "And, there you have it. Don't believe the hype. Central Park remains unsafe for women after dark. Back to you, Chuck."

References of his are frequently anachronistic, in one instance stating that the segment was sponsored by Brylcreem and in another asking a woman if she is a cigarette girl. Nasim Pedrad and Jason Sudeikis play anchors Wanda Ramirez and Jack Rizzoli, while the episode's host appears as one of Welch's interviewees. Towards the end of each installment, Rizzoli announces to viewers that Welch has just died; but when they cut back to Welch, he revives suddenly.

The Herb Welch character has been interpreted as a satirical take on former Good Day New York reporter Dick Oliver. However, Hader has said the character stemmed from a sketch with Emma Stone where he played a different reporter, Peter de Santos; during rehearsal, he "kept pretending to hit Kristen and Emma in the face with a microphone. And that's how we came up with Herb Welch. So we wrote Herb Welch into it the next week."

Appearances

Season	Episode	Host	Notes
36	November 20, 2010	Anne Hathaway	
36	January 29, 2011	Jesse Eisenberg	
36	May 21, 2011	Justin Timberlake	
37	November 12, 2011	Emma Stone	
37	May 5, 2012	Eli Manning	
40	October 11, 2014	Bill Hader	

== Julian Assange ==
Bill Hader parodies WikiLeaks founder Julian Assange.

The Julian Assange sketches were written by Seth Meyers and Christine Nangle. Nangle said in an interview that the sketches "were super fun to work on, because we were allowed to play with it. Like, we would start other sketches and interrupt them with Julian Assange ... it was fun to mix up what the normal SNL way of doing things is."

Appearances

Season	Episode	Host	Notes
36	December 4, 2010	Robert De Niro	Assange hijacks an address by President Obama to present new, more sordid information leaked from the government, in the format of TMZ on TV.
36	December 11, 2010	Paul Rudd	The arrested Assange hijacks an announcement from MasterCard to make a series of threats about what will happen if he's not released from prison.
36	December 18, 2010	Jeff Bridges	Assange, now released, hijacks a message from Mark Zuckerberg to outline why Assange, and not Zuckerberg, deserved to be named Time Person of the Year.

== Principal Daniel Frye ==
Daniel Frye (Jay Pharoah) is the wheezing, frustrated, stuttering, fast-speaking high school principal of Booker T. Washington High School who makes announcements during school dances and events where he starts off his announcements by quoting "Attention teachers and students." The announcements would revolve around the various antics that are happening at the school dances and events. Principal Frye refers to the mischievous students as "Jive Time Turkeys" and also insert the words "our beloved" before the name of the staff member (with their occupation being said before the staff member's name) when talking about what had happened to them. Other characters that appear in this sketch include the unnamed vice-principal (Vanessa Bayer) who opens up the dance and/or event announcements and the gym teacher Mr. Steve Kane (Kenan Thompson) who keeps the students in line when they start booing at the speaker (played by the Host).

He is based on Jay Pharoah's former principal Jimmy Frye at Indian River High School in Virginia who had a similar wheezing mannerism.

Appearances

Season	Episode	Host	Notes
36	December 11, 2010	Paul Rudd	The math teacher Mr. Griggs (Paul Rudd) hosts Booker T. Washington High School's End of the Year Holiday Jam where the activities include dodgeball and pop-a-shot in the gymnasium, a holiday dance party in the library annex, and the appearance of the rapping rabbi Dr. Dreidel for those who celebrate Hannukah. The announcements from Principal Frye range from: A toddler running around in the cafetorium who has apparently made a huge mess from B-Hall to D-Hall. Principal Frye demands that the parent of the toddler go pick it up for Booker T. Washington High School is a high school and not a day care center.; The Christmas elf costumes that were ridden from last night's holiday show are infected with the Scabies and that those who have worn them have gotten itchy and have been rushed to the hospital. Principal Frye holds a moment of silence for the victims of the Scabies.; Someone has fed the Booker T. Trojan Horse mascot a bucket of Dr. Pepper and several Viagra tablets and is in the parking lot trying to fornicate with the Nissan Sentra with Miss Williams trapped inside. This caused Principal Fry to call in a special veterinarian that is familiar with horse erections and then holds a moment of silence to pray for Miss Williams to make a safe tactical escape.
37	April 14, 2012	Josh Brolin	Booker T. Washington High School has its Hunger Games-themed dance in the banquet hall of the Ramada Inn. There are announcements from Principal Frye ranging from: Someone spiking the punch with a bad substance where the ex-con janitor Mr. Efron had drunk it and was alone on the dance floor humping it to MC Hammer's "Pumps and a Bump" (it was mentioned by Principal Frye that Mr. Efron had already gotten two strikes and his parole officer says that he is not allowed to have "milk"). Principal Frye instructs the students not to use this wonderful night to send Mr. Efron back into the judicial system for he deserves better.; Someone bringing an iguana as a prom date (which is considered "Bestiality" in the bible) and it ended up running into the cardboard Hunger Games trees where nobody can find it. Principal Frye commented that iguanas are stuck-up animals that don't even look at anyone.; An owl getting into the building. It was later sighted making a nest inside of a vending machine.; A stray pit bull has infiltrated a limousine out front with the license plate "Sexy-N-I-No-8" where it consumed the food in the limo, was being horny as Hell, and was fornicating with the mini-bar. Principal Frye commented that someone's going to lose their deposit.; Josh Brolin appears as Teacher Liaison to the Prom Committee Mr. Harold who ended up drinking the spiked punch and mentions his affair with a student named Sharika (played by Nasim Pedrad).
38	October 13, 2012	Christina Applegate	Booker T. Washington High School has its Halloween party called the Hell-O-Ween Ball (the misspelling of Halloween on the banner was considered a bad start by the vice-principal) in the tent located in the Walmart parking lot to help promote "literacy." There are announcements from Principal Frye ranging from: A special announcement about some of the costumes worn by the students. Principal Frye orders a female student who showed up dressed as an African Princess to put a bra on since this is a family event and that nobody needs to see any runaway "bresticles."; A baboon had gotten into the tent. It was later revealed to have been a student in a convincing costume where he had cut off the rear end of the baboon costume, stuck his butt through the hole, and painted them red making it look realistic.; A reminder that there is no such Halloween character by the name of "Crackula."; Two students have been expelled for fornicating inside a Mufasa costume. What had happened on the dance floor was "two students getting it on and not a lion having a seizure."; A comment to the student that showed up dressed as a leprechaun that he is not fooling anyone.; Someone having put a pet shark in the dunk tank and Principal Frye orders whoever did it to get the shark out before someone gets attacked by the shark.; Christina Applegate appears as the school librarian Miss Schrader who is dressed as the Ghost from the Haunted Library (with the costume being mistaken as the KKK Fairy by some students and referred to by Mr. Kane as a slutty Jedi) and is accepting donations to the School Library.
38	February 9, 2013	Justin Bieber	Booker T. Washington High School has its Valentine's Day dance revolving around abstinence in the gymnasium. There are announcements from Principal Frye ranging from: Someone spiking the punch with some ecstasy where the Social Studies teacher drank it and was on the dance floor in his man-diaper doing the Cha Cha Slide.; If anyone got shot by an arrow on this night, it is actually a hobo with a crossbow lurking in the parking lot and not Cupid.; Someone had released the turtles and frogs from the Scientific Examination Lab where they have been having an inter-species gang war on the dance floor to the tunes of "Baby Got Back." Principal Frye orders the students not to wager on this exciting animal event.; A comment to the student who brought a ventriloquist dummy as a prom date to keep its dirty mouth shut and teach it some manners or it will be expelled.; Last year's abstinence dance didn't work because someone had just given birth in a photo booth where Principal Frye had to confiscate the photos so that he can have the mother collect them for these pictures are memories that should last a lifetime.; Someone had lost their wig in the punch bowl and Principal Frye orders the owner of that wig to "get their hair out."; Justin Bieber appears as a student named Bryce Dunham (who is the Head of the Social Committee) where he and his girlfriend Mary (played by Nasim Pedrad) had come up with the abstinence theme at the Dance Planning Meeting. While Bryce seems cheerfully committed to abstinence, Mary appears to be teetering on the brink of insanity from abstaining. Mr. Kane even mentions about a venereal disease back in his day during the 1970s called "Montezuma's Grenade" where "you have sex, you explode."
39	November 2, 2013	Kerry Washington	Booker T. Washington High School hosts the town's Fall Carnival where the $400 that were raised will be split between the PTA and the winner of the Students' Choice Charity called "Bail for Chris Brown." There are announcements from Principal Frye ranging from: Some of the students have stolen the Whac-A-Mole mallets and have taken it upon themselves to chase the homeless people off the property. Principal Frye reminds the students that the game is "Whac-A-Mole" and not "Whac-A-Bum."; Someone has taken off all their clothes and is parading around in what might be a cotton candy thong. Principal Frye hopes that it's cotton candy or that person must go see a doctor or someone.; Several students have been caught fornicating in the funhouse. Unfortunately, there are so many mirrors there that Principal Frye can't tell if there was either two students or a full-on orgy. The school secretary Miss Janice (who lived through the 1970s) was still shocked at this sordid display and fainted at first sight.; An opossum is posing as a churro vendor. If anyone is looking for a snack, Principal Frye recommends they get funnel cake.; Someone has placed a nurse shark in the apple bobbing barrel and then poured a can of Red Bull in there as well causing the nurse shark to behave aggressively where it plans to check things off its "to-do list". Principal Frye suggests that nobody goes bobbing for apples unless they value the lips on their face.; There's a dirty diaper in the ball pit and somebody will catch hepatitis.; Kerry Washington plays 1st Year Teacher Miss Terry who works as the carnival's dunk tank clown (though Mr. Kane claims that she was tricked into volunteering for the job) and has a hard time with the students that are angry at her for failing them in their mid-term exams and calling their parents.
39	April 5, 2014	Anna Kendrick	Booker T. Washington High School goes on a field trip to the Norfolk Zoo after they sold a record number of candy bars which made this field trip possible where one student sold so many, it was suspicious. There are announcements from Principal Frye ranging from: Someone had put a bandana-wearing rat and a large pepperoni pizza in the turtle habitat hoping to create their own Teenage Mutant Ninja Turtles situation. Principal Frye states that the rat is not trained in martial arts and it can't swim. The cheese from the pepperoni pizza has made the water there very murky.; If anyone finds a zebra, Principal Frye wants them to tell the zebra that he would like to have a word with him and to tell him to make up his mind. Principal Frye even quoted "Black or white. He can't be both. He's not Drake."; Someone has slashed the tires on the school bus making the ice cream party after the field trip not happen. As a result of what happened to the bus, everyone has to ride home in rented Ford Fusions. Principal Frye hopes that everyone is happy because some of the students are going to have to ride in the hatchbacks.; A bunch of students have thrown 30 beach balls into the hippopotamus exhibit causing a real-life game of Hungry Hungry Hippos.; Someone gave a Smartphone to a monkey where it has started a Snapchat account and has been sending around pictures that are very inappropriate. Principal Frye advises the students to never trust a monkey in the matters of love.; Anna Kendrick plays zookeeper Sarah Didrichsen who gives a presentation about the elephant that will be arriving at the zoo named "Ashy Larry" (a name chosen by one of the students after Booker T. Washing High School won the zoo's "Name an Animal" contest) and shows off the rescue iguana named Four Loko (who was named after the drink that it was fed) that was rescued from Booker T. Washington High School who had just gotten out of animal rehab. Then she gets infuriated with the students when Four Loko is stolen by one of them who has replaced Four Loko with a Shrek toy.

== What's That Name? ==
A game show hosted by Vince Blight (Bill Hader).

Season	Episode	Host	Notes
36	December 11, 2010	Paul Rudd	Contestants Jake (Rudd) and Carolyn (Vanessa Bayer) successfully identify Subway spokesman Jared Fogle and actor Steve Zahn, but Jake can't remember the name of his doorman, Norman (Kenan Thompson), and Carolyn fails to provide the name of her office cleaning lady Mary (Kristen Wiig). Jake successfully guesses that at least one of his summer interns is named Josh, but loses his winnings when he still can't remember the doorman's name.
36	May 21, 2011	Justin Timberlake	Timberlake and musical guest Lady Gaga play themselves as contestants on the show. They have no trouble identifying animated character MC Skat Kat and actor Wallace Shawn, but Timberlake fails to come up with the names of Katie (Abby Elliott), a girl he slept with two weeks earlier; and his former N Sync bandmate Chris Kirkpatrick (Taran Killam). By contrast, Lady Gaga not only identifies a fan (Fred Armisen) she met briefly after a concert, but also remembers his sister, and shows up Timberlake by knowing Kirkpatrick's name and the purpose of the charity Timberlake is representing.
44	March 2, 2019	John Mulaney	

== Merryville Carnival Ride ==
A couple is enjoying a carnival ride featuring singing animatronic robots (played by the host, Taran Killam, and Bill Hader), when the ride suddenly breaks down. As the couple waits to start moving again (with updates from a repairman (Bobby Moynihan)), the robots continue to repeat their routine; however, one of the riders notices that the routine is changing so as to imply an ominous threat to the couple.

Appearances

Season	Episode	Host	Notes
36	January 8, 2011	Jim Carrey	Kenan Thompson and Kristen Wiig ride the Merryville Trolley Ride, where Thompson is attacked by the robots.
36	May 21, 2011	Justin Timberlake	On the Merryville Love Tunnel ride, Jason Sudeikis is alarmed when the robots hit on his girlfriend Nasim Pedrad.
38	October 20, 2012	Bruno Mars	On the Merryville Haunted Castle ride, Vanessa Bayer is much more concerned about the robots than Jay Pharoah is, but after Pharoah is dragged off, she finds she cannot resist a fourth robot played by guest Tom Hanks.

== Triangle Sally ==
Kristen Wiig portrays a 1980s-era "musician" whose act consists entirely of dancing and occasionally tapping a triangle.

Appearances

Season	Episode	Host	Notes
36	January 8, 2011	Jim Carrey	In an ad for the Time–Life DVD collection "The Worst of Soul Train", Sally appears performing "her only recorded song", "I Have a Triangle". The host notes that "Triangle Sally died halfway through that song."
37	November 19, 2011	Jason Segel	Sally appears in an ad for the holiday compilation album, A New Jack Thanksgiving.
37	December 17, 2011	Jimmy Fallon	Ludwig van Beethoven (Fallon) introduces Sally as part of the orchestra performing the 1824 premiere of his Ninth Symphony.

Triangle Sally also appeared in an installment of The Original Kings of Catchphrase Comedy that was scheduled to air on May 19, 2012, as part of Wiig's final episode as an SNL cast member. The sketch was cut from the episode before airing, but was released online.

== Jacob the Bar Mitzvah Boy ==
13-year-old Jacob (Vanessa Bayer) was introduced in a sketch featuring his bar mitzvah, which his father (Fred Armisen) had insisted on turning into a star-studded extravaganza despite Jacob's protests that a "modest luncheon" would have been fine.

Jacob has subsequently been featured on Weekend Update, to tell the stories of Hanukkah and Passover. In each of these appearances, he reads from a prepared speech peppered with corny jokes (usually repeating a punchline on a later joke, even if it doesn't make sense); after each joke, he looks up at the audience with a grin. When Seth Meyers or Michael Che tells him he doesn't need to read from a script, or tries to engage him in dialogue, Jacob just smiles and then resumes his speech. Jacob is also incredibly shy when talking to Cecily Strong and most likely girls in general.

Bayer had told one of the SNL writers about the Jacob character, which she had originated in her stand-up, but didn't write the first bar mitzvah sketch herself. About the character, she said: "When I was in seventh grade, we had bar and bat mitzvahs every weekend, so I had a lot of experience with that kind of boy. I was bat mitzvahed, and there were so many awkward boys running around."

Jacob wears a yarmulke with the New York Yankees logo and is a devoted Yankees fan.

Appearances

Season	Episode	Host	Notes
36	January 15, 2011	Gwyneth Paltrow	Jacob's lavish bar mitzvah features a slew of celebrity musicians singing Jewish-themed versions of their hit songs. Paltrow plays Taylor Swift. Jay Pharoah plays Jay-Z. Nasim Pedrad plays Alicia Keys. Abby Elliott plays Katy Perry. Musical guest Cee Lo Green appears as himself.
38	December 15, 2012	Martin Short	Jacob tells the story of Hanukkah.
38	April 6, 2013	Melissa McCarthy	Jacob tells the story of Passover.
38	May 18, 2013	Ben Affleck	Appears with other characters in the background of Stefon sketch.
39	October 5, 2013	Miley Cyrus	Jacob explains traditions of Shabbat.
39	December 7, 2013	Paul Rudd	Jacob once again explains the story of Hanukkah.
39	April 12, 2014	Seth Rogen	Jacob once again tells the story of Passover.
40	December 13, 2014	Martin Freeman	Jacob once again talks about Hanukkah.
40	April 11, 2015	Taraji P. Henson	Jacob once again talks about Passover. Billy Crystal appears as Jacob's father.
42	April 15, 2017	Jimmy Fallon	Jacob once again talks about Passover.

== The Original Kings of Catchphrase Comedy ==
A parody of The Original Kings of Comedy, showcasing hacky stand-up comedians who rely on strange catchphrases, gestures, and nicknames for a laugh, in the same vein as Jeff Foxworthy, Larry the Cable Guy and Bill Engvall.

According to SNL writer Christine Nangle, the Kings of Catchphrase Comedy sketches "are so fun, because the whole cast gets involved and you give them a catchphrase and then they improvise – some of them improvise their own catchphrases. And you just get to see everybody come through that day – because it takes a while to film it all – and just kind of be hilarious. You just kind of let them go and you're reminded of how talented our cast really is."

Appearances

Season	Episode	Host	Notes
36	March 12, 2011	Zach Galifianakis	
37	November 5, 2011	Charlie Day	

An installment of the sketch was scheduled to air on May 19, 2012, but was cut. It was later released online.

== Get in the Cage! ==
Actor Nicolas Cage (Andy Samberg) sits down with a fellow thespian (appearing as himself) to discuss their craft. However, the only question Cage ever seems to ask is why he doesn't appear in a movie that his interviewee is trying to promote. In a re-occurring gag and catch phrase, in each sketch, the interviewee will insult Cage, and after a brief thinking pause, Samberg (as Cage) will misinterpret the insult as a compliment, exclaiming, "That's high praise!" In the interview where Nicolas Cage interviewed Nicolas Cage, the real Cage delivered the "That's high praise!" line.

Appearances

Season	Episode	Host	Notes
36	April 2, 2011	Elton John	Cage interviews Jake Gyllenhaal.
36	May 21, 2011	Justin Timberlake	Cage interviews Bradley Cooper.
37	December 17, 2011	Jimmy Fallon	Cage interviews Jude Law.
37	February 11, 2012	Zooey Deschanel	Cage interviews his own clone, played by the real Nicolas Cage.
37	May 12, 2012	Will Ferrell	Cage interviews Liam Neeson.
39	May 17, 2014	Andy Samberg	Cage interviews Paul Rudd.

== The Best of Both Worlds ==
As Hugh Jackman, Andy Samberg hosts a talk show for actors whose roles portray radically different sides of their personality. Bobby Moynihan plays the stage manager, Richie.

Appearances

Season	Episode	Host	Notes
36	April 9, 2011	Helen Mirren	Mirren appears as Julie Andrews. Kenan Thompson appears as Ice Cube.
37	October 8, 2011	Ben Stiller	Stiller appears as Mandy Patinkin. Bill Hader appears as Clint Eastwood. Abby Elliott appears as Nancy Grace. Hugh Jackman makes a special appearance as Daniel Radcliffe.

== Bongo's Clown Room ==
Jason Sudeikis plays MC Tommy, the host of a seedy strip club.

Appearances

Season	Episode	Host	Notes
36	April 9, 2011	Helen Mirren	
37	February 4, 2012	Channing Tatum	

== Dictator's Two Best Friends From Growing Up ==
Bayer and Armisen appear on Weekend Update to discuss the many great qualities of their friend (a ruthless dictator), while going into hushed asides about his breaches of etiquette.

Appearances

Season	Episode	Host	Notes
36	May 7, 2011	Tina Fey	Muammar Gaddafi
37	October 1, 2011	Melissa McCarthy	Muammar Gaddafi
37	January 14, 2012	Daniel Radcliffe	Kim Jong-Un
38	September 22, 2012	Joseph Gordon-Levitt	Bashar al-Assad
38	February 9, 2013	Justin Bieber	King Richard III
39	March 8, 2014	Lena Dunham	Vladimir Putin
42	December 17, 2016	Casey Affleck	Vladimir Putin
50	February 16, 2025	50th Anniversary Special	Lorne Michaels

Preceded by Recurring Saturday Night Live characters and sketches introduced 2009–10	Recurring Saturday Night Live characters and sketches (listed chronologically)	Succeeded by Recurring Saturday Night Live characters and sketches introduced 2011–12
