= Recurring Saturday Night Live characters and sketches introduced 2009–10 =

The following is a list of recurring Saturday Night Live characters and sketches introduced between September 26, 2009, and May 15, 2010, the thirty-fifth season of SNL.

== Pete Twinkle and Greg Stink ==
Jason Sudeikis and Will Forte are commentators in an ESPN Classic presentation of a women's sporting event from the 1980s or 1990s. While Sudeikis' Pete Twinkle attempts to engage Forte's Greg Stink in actual discussion or analysis of the event, Greg is incapable of even basic conversation. (Pete: "She just crushed a shot put with her bare hands!" Greg: "I've gotta correct you, Pete! She doesn't have bear hands, she has HUMAN hands! And people don't really say 'bear hands', they say 'paws.'")

Kristen Wiig and the episode's host generally star as the athletes. The heart of the sketch is in the frequent asides where Pete promotes the feminine or sexual product sponsoring that day's event, using rhyming jingles such as "KY Jelly: Protect her from your girth, with the greatest lube on earth!"

The sketches are written by Forte, Sudeikis, and SNL writers John Lutz and John Solomon. At the end of the 2009-2010 season, Forte told The A.V. Club, "I dislike the overuse of recurring characters as much as the next person, but we just have so much fun doing that sketch. I know we've done it a lot this year, but God, we have fun. That's kind of what it's all about."

In January 2010, Pete Twinkle and Greg Stink hosted a two-hour special, SNL Presents: Sports All-Stars, featuring sports-related SNL clips.

Appearances

Season	Episode	Host	Notes
35	October 10, 2009	Drew Barrymore	Tampax to the Max Tournament of Champions 1991 (billiards)
35	December 5, 2009	Blake Lively	Vagisil Superstars of Bowling Tournament 1989
35	January 16, 2010	Sigourney Weaver	Summer's Eve Lady Stars of Darts Championship 1988
35	February 27, 2010	Jennifer Lopez	Gyne-Lotrimin Ladies' World Cup of Curling 1987
35	April 17, 2010	Ryan Phillippe	Today Sponge Women's Weightlifting Championship 1986
36	April 2, 2011	Elton John	K-Y Jelly Ladies Shot Put Championship 1985
37	May 12, 2012	Will Ferrell	Stayfree Maxi Pads Ladies Long Drive Championship 1994 (golf); Ferrell covers O.J. Simpson's police chase
40	February 15, 2015	40th Anniversary Special	Epilady feminine razors; as part of montage of famous sports sketches

== What Up with That? ==
Talk show host Diondre Cole (Kenan Thompson) constantly interrupts his guests by breaking into song and introducing gimmicky performers. His third guest is always Lindsey Buckingham (played by Bill Hader) who never gets an opportunity to utter a word. On the May 14, 2011, episode, the real Lindsey Buckingham appears and manages to get a few words in, attempting to explain how there happens to be two of him, but he is cut off by Diondre Cole breaking back into his song before he can do so.

Appearances

Season	Episode	Host	Notes
35	October 17, 2009	Gerard Butler	Guests: An environmental activist (Abby Elliott), James Franco (as himself), Lindsey Buckingham (Bill Hader).
35	November 21, 2009	Joseph Gordon-Levitt	Guests: Al Gore (as himself), Mindy Kaling (as herself), Buckingham (Hader).
35	December 19, 2009	James Franco	Guests: Mike Tyson (as himself), Jack McBrayer (as himself), Buckingham (Hader).
35	March 6, 2010	Zach Galifianakis	Guests: Paul Rudd (as himself), Frank Rich (as himself), Buckingham (Hader).
36	October 2, 2010	Bryan Cranston	Guests: Morgan Freeman (as himself), Ernest Borgnine (as himself), Buckingham (Hader).
36	December 4, 2010	Robert De Niro	Guests: De Niro (as himself), Robin Williams (as himself), Buckingham (Hader).
36	May 14, 2011	Ed Helms	Guests: Paul Simon (as himself), Chris Colfer (as himself), The real Lindsey Buckingham as an unexplained "another" Lindsey Buckingham, Lindsey Buckingham (Hader).
37	February 18, 2012	Maya Rudolph	Guests: Bill O'Reilly (as himself), Kate Upton (as herself), Buckingham (Hader).
38	December 15, 2012	Martin Short	Guests: Samuel L. Jackson (as himself), Carrie Brownstein (as herself), Buckingham (Hader).
40	February 15, 2015	40th Anniversary Special	As part of montage of famous musical sketches
45	April 25, 2020	no host	Quarantine Edition with guests: Charles Barkley and DJ Khaled
47	October 23, 2021	Jason Sudeikis	Guests: Oscar Isaac (as himself), Emily Ratajkowski (as herself), Nicholas Braun (as himself, although Cole mistook him for Lindsey Buckingham).

== Hollywood Dish ==
Bill Hader and Kristen Wiig play obnoxious celebrity interviewers Brady Trunk and Anastasia Sticks.

A typical Hollywood Dish sketch starts with Trunk and Sticks introducing themselves to their guest just before the interview starts. During the interview they distract their guest by making strange faces and gestures. The guest becomes more and more uncomfortable throughout the interview. They tempt the guest in giving an over-the-top reaction to some experience she has had. The guest becomes so uncomfortable she wants to leave, but is convinced to answer one more question. This question is about her opinion about a television show the guest has not seen. Bill Hader does a spit-take in response. The guest leaves when she realises the interviewers are not listening to her anymore. The sketch ends with a promo to the recording in which Trunk and Sticks question their guest's sanity, showing the inordinate reaction Trunk and Sticks wanted to squeeze out of the guest.

Appearances

Season	Episode	Host	Notes
35	November 7, 2009	Taylor Swift	
35	February 27, 2010	Jennifer Lopez	
36	November 13, 2010	Scarlett Johansson	

== Rodger Brush ==
Fred Armisen stars in this sketch where a talk show's female host is unavailable and the show's abrasive, vulgar and misogynistic producer fills in to answer the audience's questions. Bill Hader appears as a crew member getting the questions from the audience.

Appearances

Season	Episode	Host	Notes
35	November 21, 2009	Joseph Gordon-Levitt	Woman to Woman, usually hosted by Dr. Daniela Reese (Nasim Pedrad)
35	April 17, 2010	Ryan Phillippe	Teen Talk, usually hosted by Dr. Cathy Carson (Abby Elliott)
36	September 25, 2010	Amy Poehler	Maternity Matters, usually hosted by Dr. Christine Currant (Vanessa Bayer)
36	December 11, 2010	Paul Rudd	Sexually Speaking, usually hosted by Dr. LindaMarie Choice (Kristen Wiig)
38	September 15, 2012	Seth MacFarlane	Sex After 50, usually hosted by Dr. Lene Burrows-Fashunta (Cecily Strong)

== Secret Word ==
A parody of the 1960s game show Password, in which two contestants must guess hidden words based on clues from their celebrity partners. Bill Hader plays host Lyle Round, who often makes rude wisecracks about his wife; Kristen Wiig plays celebrity contestant Mindy Grayson, a washed-up stage actress. The celebrities spend more time displaying their egos and less on the game, which they are never good at playing. Kenan Thompson, as Grant Choad, took over Hader's role whenever Kristen returned to host.

The "Secret Word" sketches are written by James Anderson and Kent Sublette.

Appearances

Season	Episode	Host	Notes
35	November 21, 2009	Joseph Gordon-Levitt	Levitt plays South American singer Ricardo Consoles. Will Forte and Jenny Slate play Wiig and Gordon-Levitt's respective partners.
35	March 13, 2010	Jude Law	Law plays Russian ballet star Vladimir Kuchev. Kenan Thompson and Fred Armisen play Wiig and Law's respective partners.
36	October 9, 2010	Jane Lynch	Lynch plays comic Peggy Zellers. Armisen and Paul Brittain play and Lynch's respective partners.
36	January 15, 2011	Gwyneth Paltrow	Paltrow plays racist socialite Titsy Bismark Dublinson. Taran Killam and Thompson play Wiig and Paltrow's respective partners.
36	May 21, 2011	Justin Timberlake	Timberlake plays illusionist The Amazing Crandell. Abby Elliott and Bobby Moynihan play Wiig and Timberlake's respective partners.
37	November 12, 2011	Emma Stone	Stone plays pageant winner and ventriloquist Charlene Stumphries. Brittain and Killam play Wiig and Stone's respective partners.
37	February 4, 2012	Channing Tatum	Tatum plays Buster Allbright, an astronaut suffering flashbacks of alien anal probing (which comes up when his secret word is "probe"). Nasim Pedrad and Andy Samberg play Wiig and Tatum's respective partners.
37	May 19, 2012	Mick Jagger	Jagger plays closeted actor Chaz Bragman. Vanessa Bayer and Killam play Wiig and Jagger's respective partners.
42	November 19, 2016	Kristen Wiig	Cecily Strong plays actress Isabella Lola Coppola. Melissa Villaseñor and Moynihan play Wiig and Strong's respective partners (Moynihan's character is the same as the one from the Justin Timberlake sketch; here, his name is revealed to be Tavi).
46	December 19, 2020	Kristen Wiig	Kate McKinnon plays actress Elka Legerdi. Lauren Holt and Andrew Dismukes play Wiig and McKinnon's respective partners.

== Kickspit Underground Festival ==
As DJ Supersoak and Li'l Blaster, Jason Sudeikis and Nasim Pedrad host a series of commercials for bizarre music festivals, parodying the Gathering of the Juggalos. Bobby Moynihan appears in each one as special guest Ass Dan, and once as his identical twin brother, Butt Dave; Jay Pharoah appeared three times as "charity" promoter MC George Castanza.

The sketches are written by Mike O'Brien and Colin Jost; according to O'Brien, they were originally prompted by seeing a lengthy infomercial for the Gathering:

Colin and I decided we were going to write a parody. We came back at 3 a.m. I sat at the keyboard and he would doze in and out of sleep. Every once in a while he'd say something. "Hot dog explosion. Cast of Growing Pains." Then he'd go back to sleep. Then it would be both of us staring for a while. "Fart Monsters. Return of the Fart Monsters. Mrs. Potato Dick." And that's the first one where I really couldn't stop laughing.

Appearances

Season	Episode	Host	Notes
35	December 5, 2009	Blake Lively	Kickspit Underground Rock Festival
36	December 18, 2010	Jeff Bridges	Crunkmas Karnival
36	April 9, 2011	Helen Mirren	Crunk-Ass Easter Festival
37	October 8, 2011	Ben Stiller	Columbus Day Assblast
38	October 20, 2012	Bruno Mars	Donkey Punch the Ballot

The original sketch was first performed in dress rehearsal for the November 14, 2009, episode, featuring the episode's host January Jones instead of Pedrad, but was cut before airing. The version with Pedrad was performed in dress rehearsal for the November 21, 2009, episode, but was again cut before airing.

On the April 17, 2010, episode, the characters appeared in an "Underground Rock Minute" sketch introducing a new video from the "Thrilla Killa Klownz", played by Moynihan, as Ass Dan, and the episode's host Ryan Phillippe. The video was a parody of the video for the Insane Clown Posse's song "Miracles".

== Tina Tina Chanuse ==
Jenny Slate plays the proprietor of an array of custom doorbells, car horns and alarm clocks, each of which features Cheneuse's voice simply speaking a phrase (such as, in a doorbell for someone who likes computers, "Ding dong! Router! Netflix! What?").

Appearances

Season	Episode	Host	Notes
35	December 12, 2009	Taylor Lautner	Doorbells and More
35	February 27, 2010	Jennifer Lopez	Car Horns and More
35	April 24, 2010	Gabourey Sidibe	Alarm Clocks and More

== Garth and Kat ==
Fred Armisen and Kristen Wiig appear on Weekend Update as a musical duo who, having forgotten they were scheduled to perform, are forced to improvise holiday songs live on air. Garth and Kat insist that the songs are written in advance, and repeatedly beg Seth Meyers to continue performing, despite being wholly unprepared.

Wiig confirmed in an interview that Garth and Kat performances are unrehearsed; Armisen leads each song and she "just [tries] to follow." She told Movieline, "It's the most fun I have because so much of the show is writing, working, deadlines, trying to figure things out, punching up your sketch, knowing you're going to perform live. And that two and a half minutes of airtime is so freeing and fun."

Appearances

Season	Episode	Host	Notes
35	December 19, 2009	James Franco	
35	February 6, 2010	Ashton Kutcher	
35	May 15, 2010	Alec Baldwin	
36	October 30, 2010	Jon Hamm	
36	January 15, 2011	Gwyneth Paltrow	Paltrow appears as Garth & Kat's new songwriter, Kim Castle.
36	May 14, 2011	Ed Helms	
37	November 12, 2011	Emma Stone	Chris Martin (from that week's musical guest Coldplay) appears as Garth & Kat's new back-up singer.
37	April 14, 2012	Josh Brolin	
38	May 11, 2013	Kristen Wiig	This was Wiig's first appearance on SNL following her departure from the show.
40	Dec 20, 2014	Amy Adams	
40	February 15, 2015	40th Anniversary Special	As part of montage of famous musical sketches

== The Manuel Ortiz Show ==
Fred Armisen hosts a Latino talk show in which everyone dances wildly as each guest enters or exits.

Appearances

Season	Episode	Host	Notes
35	December 19, 2009	James Franco	
35	May 8, 2010	Betty White	
36	November 13, 2010	Scarlett Johansson	
37	October 15, 2011	Anna Faris	
37	April 7, 2012	Sofía Vergara	

== Bedelia ==
Nasim Pedrad plays an adolescent girl who finds her parents and other adults to be much more enthralling than kids her own age.

Appearances

Season	Episode	Host	Notes
35	April 10, 2010	Tina Fey	At a school dance, Bedelia would rather spend time with her mother (Fey), who's chaperoning, than with her classmates.
35	May 15, 2010	Alec Baldwin	Bedelia hangs out with her dad (Baldwin) at her birthday party cookout.
36	May 7, 2011	Tina Fey	Bedelia wants her mother (Fey) to attend a sleepover with her.

In the dress rehearsal for the December 18, 2010, episode (hosted by Jeff Bridges), a sketch appeared in which Bedelia wanted to hang out with her drama teacher (Bridges) rather than her classmates; the sketch was cut for the live episode.

== The Devil ==
Jason Sudeikis appears on Weekend Update to comment on the week's news as the Devil. Sudeikis has also appeared as Jesus in several sketches, portraying an almost identical personality and mannerisms as his portrayal of the Devil.

Appearances

Season	Episode	Host	Notes
35	April 10, 2010	Tina Fey	The Devil is outraged by the Catholic sex abuse scandal.
36	March 5, 2011	Miley Cyrus	The Devil is disgusted by the Westboro Baptist Church's funeral protests.
36	May 7, 2011	Tina Fey	The Devil is annoyed by Osama bin Laden's recent arrival in Hell.
37	November 12, 2011	Emma Stone	The Devil is horrified by the Penn State child sex abuse scandal.
38	May 18, 2013	Ben Affleck	Appears with other characters in the background of Stefon sketch.
47	October 23, 2021	Jason Sudeikis	

== Mort Mort Feingold - Accountant for the Stars ==
Mort Mort Feingold (Andy Samberg) is an old-school, low tech, Jewish CPA with an old-fashioned adding machine on his desk and stacks upon stacks of paper files all over his office. He specializes in preparing tax returns for wealthy celebrities, and the sketches lampoon the publicly perceived lifestyles, eccentricities, and vices of those celebrities through Mort Mort's comments about their financial records. Mort Mort himself is a composite of good-natured Jewish stereotypes, and throughout each sketch he delivers a steady stream of Borscht Belt comic style self-deprecating one liners about himself and about his clients' public images. A running gag in the sketches is that Mort Mort is extremely short of stature. In one installment of the sketch, he displays a photo of himself with his good friend Danny DeVito, which has been digitally manipulated to make Andy Samberg (in character as Mort Mort) appear to be several inches shorter than DeVito. The illusion of shortness is achieved in the live sketch via very simple forced perspective (specifically, Samberg is seated behind a normal-height desk on an unseen extremely low chair).

Appearances

Season	Episode	Host	Notes
35	April 17, 2010	Ryan Phillippe	Phillippe plays Robert Pattinson.
36	April 9, 2011	Helen Mirren	Mirren plays Helena Bonham Carter.

== Anthony Crispino ==
Bobby Moynihan appears on Weekend Update as a "second-hand news correspondent", offering the latest headlines, each of which he's slightly misunderstood (for example, that President Obama is "going to repeal the Bush haircuts").

Appearances

Season	Episode	Host	Notes
35	April 17, 2010	Ryan Phillippe	
36	October 2, 2010	Bryan Cranston	
36	January 8, 2011	Jim Carrey	
36	March 5, 2011	Miley Cyrus	
36	May 14, 2011	Ed Helms	
37	October 15, 2011	Anna Faris	
38	January 19, 2013	Jennifer Lawrence	
38	May 11, 2013	Kristen Wiig	
39	October 26, 2013	Edward Norton	
40	December 6, 2014	James Franco	
41	December 5, 2015	Ryan Gosling	Gosling appears as Angelo Skaggs.

Preceded by Recurring Saturday Night Live characters and sketches introduced 2008–09	Recurring Saturday Night Live characters and sketches (listed chronologically)	Succeeded by Recurring Saturday Night Live characters and sketches introduced 2010–11
