= Saturday Night Live season 39 =

Season of television series

Saturday Night Live
- Season 39
- No. of episodes: 21

Release
- Original network: NBC
- Original release: September 28, 2013 – May 17, 2014

Season chronology
- ← Previous season 38 Next → season 40

The thirty-ninth season of Saturday Night Live, an American sketch comedy series, originally aired in the United States on NBC from September 28, 2013, with host Tina Fey and musical guest Arcade Fire and concluded on May 17, 2014, with host Andy Samberg and musical guest St. Vincent with 21 episodes.

== Cast ==
At the end of the previous season, longtime cast members Fred Armisen, Bill Hader, and Jason Sudeikis all left the show after eleven, eight, and nine seasons, respectively. Soon after their departures, featured player Tim Robinson, who had been a cast member the previous season, decided to instead join the show's writing staff before this season began. Aidy Bryant, Kate McKinnon, and Cecily Strong were all promoted to repertory status.

Following Armisen, Sudeikis, Hader, and Robinson's departures from the cast, the show hired six new featured players, including SNL staff writer Mike O'Brien, who was promoted into the cast while also continuing as a writer. Besides O'Brien, the other new hires at the start of the season were Beck Bennett and Kyle Mooney of the sketch comedy group Good Neighbor, John Milhiser of the sketch group Serious Lunch, comedian and impressionist Noël Wells (known for her viral videos and impressions featured on sites such as Cracked.com), and stand-up comedian Brooks Wheelan. Midway through the season, the show also added a seventh featured player: Upright Citizens Brigade performer Sasheer Zamata. Zamata became the first black female cast member on the show since biracial Maya Rudolph's departure from the show in 2007. She made her first appearance on January 18, 2014, with host and musical guest Drake.

On May 12, 2013, NBC announced that Weekend Update anchor Seth Meyers would be the new host of Late Night in 2014, succeeding SNL alum Jimmy Fallon, as Fallon was taking over as the new host of The Tonight Show. Meyers remained Weekend Update anchor up until his departure from the show on February 1, 2014. Cecily Strong was brought up to co-anchor with Meyers, who had been on the show for thirteen seasons since 2001 (first doing sketches, then being head writer and "Weekend Update" anchor since 2006). After Meyers' departure, Colin Jost, a staff writer for the show since 2005 (and head writer for seasons 38 and 39), joined the cast on March 1, 2014, as the eighth featured player that season, and as Meyers' successor on Weekend Update, co-anchoring with Strong.

The addition of eight new cast members is the greatest since the 1995–96 season, during which nine cast members were added, making it the largest cast overhaul in eighteen years. The total of 18 cast members was an SNL record at the time, and some critics argued that the large cast contributed to how uneven the season was overall.

This would be the final season for longtime cast member Nasim Pedrad, who had been on the show for five seasons since 2009. Pedrad announced her departure from the show in June 2014 in order to work on the Lorne Michaels-produced sitcom Mulaney. Additionally, featured players Milhiser, Wells, and Wheelan were all let go after one season, and O'Brien returned to the writers' room for the next season, which would be his last overall after spending six seasons on the show since 2009.

This would also be the final season for longtime announcer Don Pardo, who died on August 18, 2014, at the age of 96. He had been the announcer for the show since its inception in 1975, missing only the 1981–82 season.

=== Cast roster ===
**Repertory players**

- Vanessa Bayer
- Aidy Bryant
- Taran Killam
- Kate McKinnon
- **Seth Meyers** (final episode: February 1, 2014)
- Bobby Moynihan
- Nasim Pedrad
- Jay Pharoah
- **Cecily Strong**
- Kenan Thompson

**Featured players**

- Beck Bennett
- **Colin Jost** (first episode: March 1, 2014)
- John Milhiser
- Kyle Mooney
- Mike O'Brien
- Noël Wells
- Brooks Wheelan
- Sasheer Zamata (first episode: January 18, 2014)

bold denotes Weekend Update anchors

== Controversy ==
During the season, the show came under criticism from critics (as well as African-American cast members Kenan Thompson and Jay Pharoah) for not including at least one black female cast member, a topic that was addressed on the November 2, 2013, show hosted by Kerry Washington. As a result, Lorne Michaels announced that the show would be holding auditions for a black female cast member, expected to join the show in January as a new featured player. On January 6, 2014, it was announced that UCB-NY performer Sasheer Zamata would be joining the cast as a featured player. She made her first appearance on January 18, 2014.

== Writers ==
At the start of the season, Rob Klein (who had been writing for the show since 2007) was promoted to co-head writer, alongside Seth Meyers and Colin Jost.

Prior to the start of the season, three new writers were hired: Claire Mulaney, younger sister of former writer John Mulaney; Mikey Day, a member of The Groundlings and cast member on MTV's Wild 'n Out; and Michael Che, a stand-up comic who had guest written for five episodes in season 38, was hired as a full-time writer. Additionally, cast member Tim Robinson (who joined the cast the previous season) was moved to the writing staff after one year as a featured player on the show. In December, Chicago Second City alum Katie Rich joined the writing staff. In January, comedians LaKendra Tookes and Leslie Jones were added to the writing staff. Both were part of the December casting call for a black female cast member.

Additionally, starting with the Miley Cyrus-hosted episode, John Solomon (who had been a writer for the show since 2006) was promoted to co-writing supervisor, alongside Marika Sawyer and Bryan Tucker.

This was also the final season for longtime writer Paula Pell (who had written for 18½ years since 1995), as she left midway through the season, after the Jimmy Fallon-hosted episode. Pell is the longest-tenured female writer in the history of the show.

Also, this was Seth Meyers' final season as a writer (a role he had been in for nine seasons since 2005; and head writer for eight calendar years since 2006), as he left the show after the Melissa McCarthy-hosted episode.

For the first half of the season, Meyers, Jost and Klein were co-head writers. After Meyers' departure, Bryan Tucker (who's been an SNL writer since 2005) replaced him as a co-head writer.

Newly hired writer Michael Che initially departed following this season to join The Daily Show as a correspondent, but returned for the start of the next season to co-anchor Weekend Update alongside Jost.

This was also the final season for longtime writers Alex Baze (Weekend Update writer for 10 years since 2004, and who was named the head of the segment in 2011), Marika Sawyer and John Solomon (both of whom had been with the show for eight years since 2006), as well as the only season for LaKendra Tookes.

== Episodes ==
No. overall	No. in season	Host	Musical guest	Original release date	Ratings/ Share
746	1	Tina Fey	Arcade Fire	September 28, 2013	4.7/12
Arcade Fire performs "Reflektor" and "Afterlife". Also, Arcade Fire members Will Butler, Régine Chassagne and Win Butler appear in the "New Cast Member or Arcade Fire" sketch.; Aaron Paul appears in the cold open and the "E-Meth commercial" sketch, reprising Jesse Pinkman from Breaking Bad (the show's series finale airing the following day) and appears as Drunk Uncle's nephew during Weekend Update.; Beck Bennett, John Milhiser, Kyle Mooney, Mike O'Brien, Noël Wells and Brooks Wheelan's first episode as cast members; Cecily Strong's first episode as Weekend Update co-anchor.
747	2	Miley Cyrus	Miley Cyrus	October 5, 2013	4.5/13
Miley Cyrus performs "Wrecking Ball" and an unplugged version of "We Can't Stop".; Kenan Thompson introduces Cyrus' first musical performance.; Seth Meyers introduces Cyrus' second musical performance.
748	3	Bruce Willis	Katy Perry	October 12, 2013	4.3/11
Katy Perry performs "Roar" and "Walking on Air".; Aaron Paul appears in the pre-filmed "E-Meth" sketch, a repeat from the episode Tina Fey hosted during the season premiere.
749	4	Edward Norton	Janelle Monáe	October 26, 2013	3.9/10
Janelle Monáe performs "Dance Apocalyptic" and "Electric Lady".; Alec Baldwin and Miley Cyrus appear in the opening monologue. Baldwin also narrates and appears in the fake Wes Anderson trailer. Cyrus also cameos in the "12 Days Not a Slave" sketch.
750	5	Kerry Washington	Eminem	November 2, 2013	4.9/12
Eminem performs "Berzerk" and "Survival" with Skylar Grey.; Rick Rubin serves as Eminem's DJ during "Berzerk".; Al Sharpton appears in the cold open.; An excerpt from a season twelve performance featuring Velvet Underground frontman Lou Reed, who had died on October 27 from liver disease, was featured after the show's Update segment.
751	6	Lady Gaga	Lady Gaga	November 16, 2013	4.9/12
Lady Gaga performs "Do What U Want" with R. Kelly and "Gypsy".; Bobby Moynihan introduces both of Gaga's musical performances
752	7	Josh Hutcherson	HAIM	November 23, 2013	4.1/10
HAIM performs "The Wire" and "Don't Save Me" and appears in the "Josie" sketch.
753	8	Paul Rudd	One Direction	December 7, 2013	4.9/12
One Direction performs "Story of My Life" and "Through the Dark" and appear in the opening monologue and in the pre-taped "Dan Charles" sketch.; Fred Armisen and Kristen Wiig appear in The Sound of Music Live! cold open, reprising their characters from The Lawrence Welk Show sketches.; Rudd's Anchorman series co-stars Will Ferrell, David Koechner (SNL alumn) and Steve Carell appear in the opening monologue. Ferrell and Koechner later reprise their "drunken salesmen" characters for the "Bill Brasky" sketch.
754	9	John Goodman	Kings of Leon	December 14, 2013	4.5/11
Kings of Leon performs "Temple" and "Wait for Me" and appear in the "Guy Fieri Holiday Special" sketch.; Robert De Niro and Sylvester Stallone appear in the "Three Wise Guys" sketch.; Wale appears in the H&M music video.
755	10	Jimmy Fallon	Justin Timberlake	December 21, 2013	6.3/16
Justin Timberlake performs "Only When I Walk Away" and "Pair of Wings" and appears in the "Wrappinville" sketch, the Celebrity Family Feud sketch (parodying Fallon), and The Barry Gibb Talk Show sketch.; Paul McCartney appears in the opening monologue.; Madonna and Barry Gibb appear in The Barry Gibb Talk Show sketch. Madonna also co-introduces Timberlake's first performance.; Michael Bloomberg appears during Weekend Update.; Chris Rock appears during the goodnights.
756	11	Drake	Drake	January 18, 2014	4.7/12
Drake performs a medley of "Started from the Bottom" and "Trophies" and a medley of "Hold On, We're Going Home" and "From Time" with singer-songwriter Jhené Aiko.; Sasheer Zamata's first episode as a cast member.; Kenan Thompson introduces Drake's first musical performance.; Vanessa Bayer introduces Drake's second musical performance.
757	12	Jonah Hill	Bastille	January 25, 2014	4.8/12
Bastille performs "Pompeii" and "Oblivion".; Hill's The Wolf of Wall Street co-star Leonardo DiCaprio appears during the opening monologue.; Michael Cera appears in the pretaped "me" sketch.
758	13	Melissa McCarthy	Imagine Dragons	February 1, 2014	5.4/13
Imagine Dragons performs "Radioactive" with Kendrick Lamar and "Demons".; Amy Poehler, Bill Hader (in character as Stefon), Andy Samberg and Fred Armisen (reprising his David Paterson impersonation) appear during Weekend Update.; Seth Meyers' final episode as cast member and as anchor of Weekend Update.; A still of Pete Seeger, who had died five days earlier, was shown in complete silence following Weekend Update.
759	14	Jim Parsons	Beck	March 1, 2014	4.6/12
Beck performs "Blue Moon" and "Wave".; J. Tillman sang backing vocals and played guitar for both of Beck's performances.; Colin Jost's first episode as a cast member and Weekend Update co-anchor.
760	15	Lena Dunham	The National	March 8, 2014	4.1/11
The National performs "Graceless" and "I Need My Girl".; Liam Neeson appears in the cold open.; Jon Hamm appears in the "What are You Even Doing? You're Being Crazy" sketch.; Fred Armisen appears during Weekend Update in character as one of "Vladimir Putin's Best Friends from Growing Up".
761	16	Louis C.K.	Sam Smith	March 29, 2014	4.0/10
Sam Smith performs "Stay with Me" and "Lay Me Down".
762	17	Anna Kendrick	Pharrell Williams	April 5, 2014	4.0/10
Pharrell Williams performs "Happy" and "Marilyn Monroe" and appears in the "Pharrell Audition" sketch.; Hans Zimmer conducts the orchestra during Pharrell Williams' second performance.; Icona Pop appears in the pre-taped "Dongs All Over the World" sketch.; The song "Louxor j'adore" by Katerine was played during the Les jeunes de Paris sketch.
763	18	Seth Rogen	Ed Sheeran	April 12, 2014	3.9/10
Ed Sheeran performs "Sing" and "Don't".; Zooey Deschanel, James Franco and Taylor Swift appear in the opening monologue. Franco also appears in the pre-taped "Monster Pals" sketch.
764	19	Andrew Garfield	Coldplay	May 3, 2014	3.9/10
Coldplay performs "Magic" and "A Sky Full of Stars". Additionally, Chris Martin appears in the "Spider-Man Kiss" sketch.; Emma Stone appears in the opening monologue and in the "Spider-Man Kiss" sketch.; Kiefer Sutherland and Mary Lynn Rajskub appear in the pre-taped "Beygency" sketch.; SNL writer Leslie Jones appears during Weekend Update.
765	20	Charlize Theron	The Black Keys	May 10, 2014	3.8/10
The Black Keys performs "Fever" and "Bullet in the Brain".; Barbara Walters appears during Weekend Update.
766	21	Andy Samberg	St. Vincent	May 17, 2014	4.0/10
St. Vincent performs "Digital Witness" and "Birth in Reverse".; Maya Rudolph appears during the cold open (reprising her impression of Beyoncé), the "Vogelchecks" sketch, and the second SNL Digital Short (reprising her impression of Oprah Winfrey).; Bill Hader, Seth Meyers and Martin Short appear in the opening monologue. Hader also appears during the "Vogelchecks" sketch.; Lil Jon appears in the first SNL Digital Short.; Paul Rudd appears during Weekend Update and the "Vogelchecks" sketch.; Fred Armisen and Kristen Wiig appear in the "Vogelchecks" sketch. Wiig also appears during the "Bvlgari watch" sketch.; Tatiana Maslany, Akiva Schaffer, Jorma Taccone and Pharrell Williams appear during the second SNL Digital Short.; 2 Chainz appears in the "Blizzard Man" sketch.; Cecily Strong's final episode as Weekend Update co-anchor.; Don Pardo's final episode as the announcer; John Milhiser, Mike O’Brien, Nasim Pedrad, Noël Wells, and Brooks Wheelan’s final episode as cast members.

== Specials ==
Title	Original release date	US viewers (millions)
"Saturday Night Live Halloween"	October 31, 2013	5.32
A collection of Halloween-based sketches and scary movie parodies, including: "Clinton Halloween Party" (featuring an appearance by Barack Obama) from the season 33 episode hosted by Brian Williams; "Vincent Price's Halloween Special 1959" from the season 34 episode hosted by Jon Hamm; "Most Haunted" from the season 32 episode hosted by Hugh Laurie; "Halloween Greetings from Tonto, Tarzan, and Frankenstein" from the season 15 episode hosted by James Woods; "The Merryville Brothers Halloween Ride" from the season 38 episode hosted by Bruno Mars; The Twilight parody Firelight from the season 35 episode hosted by Taylor Swift; Weekend Update: Stefon's Halloween tips from the season 38 episode hosted by Bruno Mars; "Turner Classic Movies: The Bride of Blackenstein," from the season 36 episode hosted by Jesse Eisenberg; "Aw, Nuts! Mom's a Ghost!" from the season 38 episode hosted by Kristen Wiig; "Jeff Montgomery, The Trick-Or-Treating Sex Offender" from the season 34 episode hosted by Jon Hamm
"Saturday Night Live Thanksgiving"	November 27, 2013	4.87
A collection of Thanksgiving sketches including: "Debbie Downer" from the season 30 episode hosted by Luke Wilson; Paul Simon's Monologue Worries from season 2; "The Ladies Man" from the season 24 episode hosted by Jennifer Love Hewitt; "The Regurgitating Family" from the season 25 episode hosted by Julianna Margulies; Weekend Update: Adam Sandler and Kevin Nealon singing "The Thanksgiving Song" from the season 18 episode hosted by Sinbad; Weekend Update: Garth and Kat promote their Thanksgiving album from the season 37 episode hosted by Emma Stone.; "Martha Stewart Living" from the season 27 episode hosted by Billy Bob Thornton; "Nikey Turkey" from the season 16 episode hosted by Dennis Hopper; "The Californians" and "Your Hometown Tourism Ad" from the season 38 episode hosted by Jeremy Renner; "Fuzzy Memories" from the season 21 episode hosted by David Schwimmer; "Ed Grimley Thanksgiving" from the season 10 episode hosted by Ed Asner; "Family Dinner Arguments" from the season 27 episode hosted by Gwyneth Paltrow; "Jarret's Room" from the season 28 episode hosted by Brittany Murphy; "Sarcastic Thanksgiving Dinner" from the season 35 episode hosted by Joseph Gordon-Levitt; "Bill Swerski's Superfans" from the season 17 episode hosted by Macaulay Culkin; "The Loud Family" from the season 4 episode hosted by Carrie Fisher; "Penelope" from the season 36 episode hosted by Anne Hathaway
"Saturday Night Live Christmas"	December 4, 2013	7.42
A collection of Christmas and December holiday-based sketches including: Amy Poehler, Maya Rudolph and Kristen Wiig singing "Santa's My Boyfriend"; "Homelessville" and "Dick in a Box" from the season 32 episode hosted by Justin Timberlake; opening monologue and "Michael Bublé Christmas Duets" from the season 37 episode hosted by Jimmy Fallon; "Winter Wonderland" performed by the cast from the season 1 episode hosted by Candice Bergen; "Glengarry Glen Santa's Workshop" from the season 31 episode hosted by Alec Baldwin; "A Holiday Wish" from the season 12 episode hosted by Chevy Chase, Steve Martin and Martin Short; Weekend Update: Adam Sandler sings "The Chanukah Song" from the season 20 episode hosted by Roseanne.; Jeff Bridges and Cookie Monster singing "Silver Bells" from season 36; TV Funhouse: "Christmastime for the Jews" from the season 31 episode hosted by Jack Black; John Malkovich reads The Night Before Christmas in season 34.; "Consumer Probe: Holiday Edition" from the season 2 episode hosted by Candice Bergen; Weekend Update: The Girl You Wish You Hadn't Started A Conversation With At A Party, "You're a Rat Bastard, Charlie Brown", "A Tony Bennett Christmas" and "What Up With That?" from the season 38 episode hosted by Martin Short; "Martha Stewart Topless Christmas Special" from the season 22 episode hosted by Martin Short; "The Robert Goulet All-Holiday Special" from the season 27 episode hosted by Hugh Jackman; Weekend Update: Drunk Uncle from the season 37 episode hosted by Steve Buscemi; "Season's Greetings from Saturday Night Live" from the season 26 episode hosted by Val Kilmer; "Delicious Dish" from the season 24 episode hosted by Alec Baldwin; "Mary Katherine Gallagher" from the season 22 episode hosted by Rosie O'Donnell
"SNL Best of This Season"	January 4, 2014	5.6/14
A collection of sketches from seasons 38 and 39, including: "Obama's Address" from the season 39 episode hosted by John Goodman; The opening monologue from the season 39 episode hosted by Paul Rudd featuring musical guest One Direction and special appearances by Will Ferrell, David Koechner, and Steve Carell; "Girls promo" from the season 39 episode hosted by Tina Fey; "Shallon: Stranger Danger" and The Midnight Coterie of Sinister Intruders from the season 39 episode hosted by Edward Norton; "Girlfriends Talk Show" from the season 38 episode hosted by Anne Hathaway; "Waking Up with Kimye" from the season 39 episode hosted by Lady Gaga; "Boy Dance Party" from the season 39 episode hosted by Bruce Willis; Several Weekend Update clips and segments from various season 39 episodes; "Our Love" and "The Baby Man Boss" from the season 39 episode hosted by Josh Hutcherson; "How's He Doing?" and "Good Neighbor: Ice Cream" from the season 39 episode hosted by Kerry Washington; "We Did Stop (The Government)" from the season 39 episode hosted by Miley Cyrus
"SNL Presents: SNL Sports Spectacular"	January 30, 2014	4.79
A collection of sketches from episodes hosted by professional athletes and other sports stars, hosted by Seth Meyers, including: Pamela Bell sings the national anthem at the 2006 World Series from the season 32 episode hosted by Hugh Laurie.; Derek Jeter's opening monologue and "Derek Jeter's Taco Hole" from season 27; "Schmitt's Gay Beer Commercial" and "Daily Affirmation with Stuart Smalley" from the season 17 episode hosted by Michael Jordan; "United Way" and "Locker Team Motivation" from the season 32 episode hosted by Peyton Manning; Weekend Update: Charles Barkley and Shaquille O'Neal from the season 39 episode hosted by Kerry Washington; "Cookie Dough Sport Commercial" from the season 23 episode hosted by Matthew Perry; "What's Up with That?" from the season 35 episode hosted by James Franco; "Broncos Locker Room" from the season 37 episode hosted by Jimmy Fallon; "SportsCenter" from the season 24 episode hosted by Ray Romano; Kannon AE-1 from the season 8 episode hosted by Stevie Wonder; "Bernard" from the season 24 episode hosted by Kelsey Grammer; "MacGruber", "MacGruber II", "MacGruber III" from the season 35 episode hosted by Charles Barkley; "Outside the Lines" from the season 38 episode hosted by Melissa McCarthy; "Super Bowl Promo" from the season 37 episode hosted by Channing Tatum; "Fernando's Hideaway" from the season 10 episode hosted by Mr. T and Hulk Hogan; "Read to Achieve" from the season 33 episode hosted by LeBron James; "Little Brothers" from the season 37 episode hosted by Eli Manning; "Lillehammer '94 Figure Skating" from the season 19 episode hosted by Nancy Kerrigan; "Synchronized Swimming" from the season 10 premiere that had no host; Weekend Update: All Drug Olympics from the season 14 episode hosted by Tom Hanks; "Vagisil Superstars of Bowling Tournament 1989" from the season 35 episode hosted by Blake Lively; "Yankee Stadium Stories" from the season 34 episode hosted by James Franco; TV Funhouse: "Sexual Harassment and You" from the season 30 episode hosted by Tom Brady; "Bowl Madness" from the season 37 episode hosted by Charles Barkley; "Little Chocolate Donuts" from the first season 3 episode hosted by Buck Henry; Weekend Update: Billie Jean King from the season 39 episode hosted by Jimmy Fallon; "Locker Room Motivation" from the season 34 episode hosted by Michael Phelps
"SNL Shorts"	April 24, 2014	N/A
A collection of filmed shorts including: "Djesus Uncrossed" from the season 38 episode hosted by Christoph Waltz; "Deep Thoughts: On How Kids Like To Be Tricked" from the season 16 episode hosted by Kevin Bacon; "Wayne and Garth: Truth or Dare with Madonna" from the season 16 episode hosted by Delta Burke; "Lazy Sunday" from the season 31 episode hosted by Jack Black; "Swan Lake" from the season 3 episode hosted by Steve Martin (22-Apr-1978); "Synchronized Swimmers" from season 10 (6-Oct-1984); "Deep Thoughts: Hambone & Flippy" (possibly from S23E11); "Don' You Go Rounin' Roun To Re Ro" from the season 36 episode hosted by Russell Brand; "Sad Mouse" from the season 38 episode hosted by Bruno Mars; "Deep Thoughts: Laughter as the best medicine" from season 17, episode hosted by Michael Jordan; "Flirty Neighbors" from the season 39 episode hosted by Anna Kendrick; "United Way" from the season 32 episode hosted by Peyton Manning"; "Ambiguously Gay Duo: It Takes Two To Tango" from the season 22 episode hosted by Tom Hanks; "Deep Thoughts: On Telling Kids Where Rain Comes From" from the season 16 episode hosted by Sting; "(Do It On My) Twin Bed" from the season 39 episode hosted by Jimmy Fallon; "Prose and Cons" from the season 7 episode with musical guest Rod Stewart; "MacGruber", "MacGruber II", "MacGruber III" from the season 35 episode hosted by Charles Barkley; "La Dolce Gilda" from the season 3 episode hosted by Michael Sarrazin; "Star Wars Screen Tests" from the season 22 episode hosted by Kevin Spacey; "Real Housewives of Disney" from the season 37 episode hosted by Lindsay Lohan; The Midnight Coterie of Sinister Intruders from the season 39 episode hosted by Edward Norton; "Chris for President" from the season 39 episode hosted by Louis C.K.; "Love Is a Dream" from the season 14 episode hosted by Melanie Griffith; "The Golords" from the season 23 episode hosted by Julianne Moore; "Push Button To Explode Building" from the season 7 episode hosted by Susan St. James; "Lincoln" from the season 38 episode hosted by Louis C.K.; "The Hit" from the season 39 episode hosted by Jonah Hill; "Doogie Howser M.D." from the season 34 episode hosted by Neil Patrick Harris; "Deep Thoughts: On Laughing At Grandpa" from the season 17 episode hosted by Kiefer Sutherland and the season 18 episode hosted by Nicolas Cage; "White Like Eddie" from the season 10 episode hosted by Eddie Murphy; "Boy Dance Party" from the season 39 episode hosted by Bruce Willis; "Danielle" from the season 38 episode hosted by Jennifer Lawrence; "History of Punk" from the season 38 episode hosted by Vince Vaughn; "Deep Thoughts: On What Frightens Ants The Most" from the season 18 episode hosted by Jason Alexander; "Dick in a Box" from the season 32 episode hosted by Justin Timberlake; "The Baby and The German Intellectual" from the season 26 episode hosted by Jennifer Lopez; "A Film by Gary Weis: Homeward Bound" from the season 1 episode hosted by Candice Bergen (20-Dec-1975)
