= Recurring Saturday Night Live characters and sketches introduced 2008–09 =

The following is a list of recurring Saturday Night Live characters and sketches introduced between September 13, 2008, and May 16, 2009, the thirty-fourth season of the show.

== Googie Rene's stores ==
Rene (Kenan Thompson) sells discounted garments with mysterious stains.

Appearances

Season	Episode	Host	Notes
34	September 27, 2008	Anna Faris	Googie Rene's Slightly Stained Wedding Dress Basement; this sketch was previously included in the dress rehearsal for the September 13 episode, but was cut from that episode's live broadcast
36	October 23, 2010	Emma Stone	Googie Rene's Partially Damaged Halloween Costume Discount Basement
36	May 7, 2011	Tina Fey	Googie Rene's Slightly Damaged Prom Wear Barn

A sketch featuring "Googie Rene's Partially Damaged Christmas Decorations" was included in the dress rehearsal for the December 10, 2011, episode, hosted by Katy Perry, but was cut for the live broadcast.

== The Lawrence Welk Show ==
A parody of the original "mildly-entertaining" Lawrence Welk Show, this PBS rerun, hosted by Fred Armisen as Welk, features the singing act The Maharelle Sisters, from the Finger Lakes. The performance in the original Maharelle sisters skit closely resembles that of Rosemary Clooney and Vera-Ellen in the 1954 movie White Christmas. Each performance begins by featuring each of three attractive, flirtatious women, before introducing the fourth sister, Dooneese (Kristen Wiig), (sometimes spelled "Judice"; spellings differ in SNL sources) whose deformities include an extremely tall forehead, tiny hands the size of an infant's, and an odd canine tooth. As each of the women sings in turn, Dooneese's contribution at the end is inevitably a weird or disturbing rant, such as describing eating cats or having worms in her hair. She often makes inappropriate sexual advances toward any men co-starring in the performance.

The three normal sisters have been played by both guests and cast members, including Jenny Slate, Abby Elliott, Michaela Watkins, Casey Wilson, Nasim Pedrad, Vanessa Bayer, Amy Poehler, Ana Gasteyer, Maya Rudolph, Cecily Strong and Anne Hathaway.

Season	Episode	Host	Notes
34	October 4, 2008	Anne Hathaway	Hathaway plays Maharelle sister Janice. Amy Poehler and Casey Wilson play the other two sisters, Holly and Nora.
34	May 16, 2009	Will Ferrell	Ferrell plays Lawrence Welk Show performer Ted Nathers. Casey Wilson, Michaela Watkins, and Abby Elliott play the other sisters (who are unnamed).
35	December 19, 2009	James Franco	Franco plays Lawrence Welk Show performer Rico Garlando. Jenny Slate, Abby Elliott, and Nasim Pedrad play the other sisters (Rhonda, Shirley, and Nancy, respectively).
35	May 8, 2010	Betty White	White plays the singing sisters' mother. Rachel Dratch, Tina Fey, and Molly Shannon make cameo appearances in the beginning of the sketch as The Marvelous Jugglettes. Amy Poehler, Maya Rudolph, and Ana Gasteyer make special appearances as Maharelle sisters Janet, Peggy, and Clara.
36	April 2, 2011	Elton John	John plays Lawrence Welk Show performer Frances Lynn Mulge. Abby Elliott, Nasim Pedrad, and Vanessa Bayer play the other sisters (Shirley, Nancy, and Toni, respectively).
37	October 1, 2011	Melissa McCarthy	McCarthy plays Cousin Gert, who has her own deformities, including superhuman strength. Abby Elliott, Nasim Pedrad, and Vanessa Bayer play the other sisters (Shirley, Nancy, and Toni).
37	May 19, 2012	Mick Jagger	Jagger did not appear in the sketch (which served as this episode's cold open). Jon Hamm appeared in cameo as Lawrence Welk Show performer Johnny Prosciutto. Abby Elliott, Nasim Pedrad, and Vanessa Bayer play the other sisters (Shirley, Nancy, and Toni). Kate McKinnon appears as Johnny Prosciutto's mother.
38	May 11, 2013	Kristen Wiig	Kristen Wiig comes back as Dooneese. Nasim Pedrad, Vanessa Bayer, and Cecily Strong play the other sisters (Nancy, Toni, and Sandy). Jason Sudeikis plays Lawrence Welk Show performer Dorian Permes.
39	December 7, 2013	Paul Rudd	Kristen Wiig and Fred Armisen come back and reprise their roles as Dooneese and Lawrence Welk in a parody of The Sound of Music Live!. Kate McKinnon plays Maria, Taran Killam plays Captain von Trapp, and Cecily Strong, Beck Bennett, Nasim Pedrad, Bobby Moynihan, and Noel Wells play the von Trapp children.
50	February 16, 2025	50th Anniversary Special	Kristen Wiig comes back as Dooneese. Scarlett Johansson, Kim Kardashian, and Ana Gasteyer play the other sisters (Janice, Holly, and Margaret). Will Ferrell reprises his impression of Robert Goulet.

== Jeff Montgomery ==
A Will Forte character.

Appearances

Season	Episode	Host	Notes
34	October 25, 2008	Jon Hamm	43-year-old Jeff Montgomery comes trick-or-treating at the home of Bob Peterson (Hamm). Montgomery indicates he's costumed as a sex offender for Halloween, but is evasive as to whether he is also a real-life sex offender introducing himself to neighbors to comply with the law.
34	November 22, 2008	Tim McGraw	Montgomery appears at a large Thanksgiving gathering, where it's eventually realized that none of the hosts or guests know who he is. He eventually mentions that he's an escapee from a mental institution.

A sketch featuring Jeff Montgomery and his father (played by special guest Dan Aykroyd) terrorizing their neighbors was included in the dress rehearsal for the February 14, 2009 episode (hosted by Alec Baldwin), but was cut for the live broadcast.

A sketch featuring Jeff Montgomery trick-or-treating was included in the dress rehearsal for the October 17, 2009, episode (hosted by Gerard Butler), but was cut for the live broadcast.

== Stefon ==
Bill Hader plays Stefon, a club kid and city correspondent for Weekend Update. He is asked by Seth Meyers to offer tips on wholesome things for tourists to do in New York City, but instead offers tips on the hottest (or more accurately, most bizarre) New York nightlife. May 18, 2013 marked the final appearance of Stefon as a recurring character, as Hader concluded his final season as SNL cast member.

Appearances

Season	Episode	Host	Notes
34	November 1, 2008	Ben Affleck	Stefon is introduced in a sketch where he and Affleck are the Zolesky Brothers, making a pitch for a coming-of-age film interspersed with gay sex scenes.
35	April 24, 2010	Gabourey Sidibe	Stefon's first Weekend Update appearance, discussing family vacation spots.
35	May 15, 2010	Alec Baldwin	
36	October 23, 2010	Emma Stone	
36	December 11, 2010	Paul Rudd	
36	December 18, 2010	Jeff Bridges	As one of Seth Meyers' favorite trio of commentators, Stefon is joined by New York governor David Paterson (Fred Armisen) and Snooki (Bobby Moynihan) in singing a Christmas song.
36	February 12, 2011	Russell Brand	
36	May 7, 2011	Tina Fey	
36	May 21, 2011	Justin Timberlake	Only appearance where Hader did not break character; his appearance lasted roughly 30 seconds.
37	October 8, 2011	Ben Stiller	Stefon and Derek Zoolander (Stiller) promote a charity to help fat kids.
37	December 10, 2011	Katy Perry	Also appears in promos for this episode.
37	February 18, 2012	Maya Rudolph	Appeared in the opening monologue.
37	March 11, 2012	Jonah Hill	Kisses Seth Meyers for the first time in this episode.
37	May 19, 2012	Mick Jagger	
38	October 20, 2012	Bruno Mars	
38	March 9, 2013	Justin Timberlake	
38	May 18, 2013	Ben Affleck	Ben Affleck makes a cameo appearance reprising his role as Stefon's brother, David Zolefsky. Stefon's appearance in this episode marked his last as a recurring character.
39	February 1, 2014	Melissa McCarthy	Stefon makes his first guest appearance along with Amy Poehler on Seth Meyers' final Weekend Update.
40	October 11, 2014	Bill Hader	Second guest appearance and Hader's first as SNL host. Stefon reveals he is pregnant.
40	February 15, 2015	SNL 40th Anniversary Special	Appeared alongside Edward Norton, who was dressed as Stefon and doing an impression of him, as well as Seth Meyers mentioning their unnamed children.
43	March 17, 2018	Bill Hader	Stefon co-creator John Mulaney appears as Stefon's lawyer, Shy.

== Grady Wilson ==
Kenan Thompson plays the Sanford and Son character Grady Wilson as the host of a series of instructional sex films.

Appearances

Season	Episode	Host	Notes
34	November 1, 2008	Ben Affleck	"Grady Wilson's Put the Fire Back in your Marriage Techniques"
35	September 26, 2009	Megan Fox	"Grady Wilson's Burning Up the Bedsheets"
35	January 16, 2010	Sigourney Weaver	"Grady Wilson's Fifty and Freaky"; Weaver appears as a Dutch woman.
35	May 15, 2010	Alec Baldwin	"Grady Wilson's Intimate & International"; Baldwin appears as a Greek man, Kostos.
36	January 8, 2011	Jim Carrey	"Grady Wilson's Tantric and Tasty"; Carrey appears as the erotic shaman Leelicious.

== The Vogelchecks ==
Fred Armisen, Kristen Wiig and Bill Hader star in this sketch about a family that expresses affection, at the slightest provocation, with slobbery French kissing and other disturbingly intimate acts. In the sketch, another member of the family (usually played by the episode's host) brings home a new girlfriend/boyfriend to meet his parents (Armisen and Wiig) and brother Dwayne (Hader). The girlfriend is initially put off by the family's eager physical affection, but is won over by a heartfelt speech from Armisen.

Appearances

Season	Episode	Host	Notes
34	November 15, 2008	Paul Rudd	Austin Vogelcheck (Rudd) brings his college roommate Kevin (Andy Samberg) home for a weekend with the Vogelcheck family.
35	December 19, 2009	James Franco	Lonny Vogelcheck (Franco) brings his girlfriend Lindsey (Abby Elliott) home for Christmas. Grandpa Josef (Will Forte) and Grandma Vogelcheck (Nasim Pedrad) also attend. This sketch originally appeared in the dress rehearsal for the December 12, 2009, episode hosted by Taylor Lautner, but was cut for the live broadcast.
35	March 6, 2010	Zach Galifianakis	Ronny Vogelcheck (Bobby Moynihan) brings his girlfriend Shelley (Jenny Slate) home for the funeral of Great-Grandpa Opel Vogelcheck (Will Forte), where she meets his family. Galifianakis appears as the priest, Father Yankovic.
36	December 11, 2010	Paul Rudd	Austin returns with his girlfriend Amanda (Vanessa Bayer), and the Vogelchecks greet their Romanian relatives Aunt Elaine (Nasim Pedrad) and Uncle Vlad (Paul Brittain) for Christmas.
37	November 19, 2011	Jason Segel	Jacob Vogelcheck (Segel) brings his girlfriend Lucy (Vanessa Bayer) home for Thanksgiving. Paul Rudd returns as Austin in the sketch.
39	May 17, 2014	Andy Samberg	Brecken Vogelcheck (Samberg) brings his boyfriend Matt (Taran Killam) to watch the football draft. Paul Rudd reprises his role and Maya Rudolph is a nurse to Grandma Vogelcheck (Kate McKinnon).

== Dateline ==
Bill Hader plays Dateline correspondent Keith Morrison hosting "Real-Life Crimes and Stories of Real People in Bad Situations", a series of short interviews with victims of pain and suffering. The sketch revolves around Morrison's sinister persona: during the interviews, Hader utters trite remarks, makes creepy faces and sounds, expresses disgust at awful things not happening, and admits he gets a creepy delight out of other people's suffering.

Appearances

Season	Episode	Host	Notes
34	November 22, 2008	Tim McGraw	Morrison interviews a woman (Kristen Wiig) whose boyfriend was found dead in a car trunk; a couple (Jason Sudeikis and Casey Wilson) attacked by sharks; and a man (McGraw) whose wife murdered their neighbors.
34	March 14, 2009	Tracy Morgan	Morrison interviews a man (Andy Samberg) who walked in on a convenience store robbery; a couple (Abby Elliott and Kenan Thompson) who had the roof cave in on their wedding; and a convicted murderer and cannibal (Morgan).
37	December 3, 2011	Steve Buscemi	Morrison covers the 'Mystery of the Chopped-up Guy' wherein the man accused of chopping up the guy (Buscemi) admits he chopped up the guy immediately. Morrison then speaks to others involved in the case despite there being nothing to investigate.

Hader reprised his Keith Morrison impression in the September 24, 2009, episode of Weekend Update Thursday, where he interviewed President Obama (Fred Armisen) about the "death panel" issue.

== Shana ==
Kristen Wiig plays an outwardly sexy woman (strongly resembling Marilyn Monroe) who nonetheless does everything in the least sexy way possible. In each sketch she enters a room where several male coworkers were present, all of whom are initially attracted by her curvaceous contours, her sweet childlike voice, her fetching walk, and her shy and demure demeanor. However, her behavior is quickly punctuated with belches, farts, accidental urination or defecation, loud braying laughs, tasteless and vulgar remarks, and fits of spastic, uncoordinated movement. By the end of the sketch, all of the men except one (usually played by the episode's host) are completely repulsed by her; the holdout is even more smitten than when she first arrived.

In an interview with Alec Baldwin, in which he complimented Wiig on her ability to switch between sexy and unsexy characters, Wiig replied:

I have to say, one of the greatest gifts that I've gotten from SNL is getting out of my comfort zone. I realized, and I think Lorne [Michaels] realized, probably the first handful of years that I was there, most of my characters were ladies in their forties with short hair and weird sweaters, that no one wanted at their dinner party. The good thing about being at SNL, for me creatively, is to think, "Okay, I'm comfortable enough. I really want to try something that's not something that I normally do." That's when I actually first came up with the character Shana, the one that’s sexy but says gross things."

Appearances

Season	Episode	Host	Notes
34	December 6, 2008	John Malkovich	
35	January 9, 2010	Charles Barkley	
36	October 2, 2010	Bryan Cranston	
37	October 8, 2011	Ben Stiller	

== Gilly ==
A mischievous schoolgirl played by Kristen Wiig. In the standard Gilly sketch, Mr. Dillon (Will Forte) is attempting to teach his class of young students, but the class is repeatedly interrupted by pranks. After each prank, Mr. Dillon asks first Liam (Bobby Moynihan), then Sam (Kenan Thompson), if they are responsible, and the boys deny it (especially easy for Sam as his arms are both in casts). A female student usually Paula (Abby Elliott) then says that Gilly did it, and Gilly offers an insincere "sorry." The cycle repeats with the pranks becoming more dangerous and violent.

Appearances

Season	Episode	Host	Notes
34	January 17, 2009	Rosario Dawson	
34	April 11, 2009	Zac Efron	Science Fair Finals
35	October 20, 2009	Drew Barrymore	Gilly is joined by her Italian cousin, Gigli (Barrymore).
35	December 17, 2009	Christmas special	Gilly hosts the SNL Christmas special.
36	October 9, 2010	Jane Lynch	As Sue Sylvester, Lynch introduces new student Gilly to the Glee Club.
37	April 7, 2012	Sofia Vergara	Gilly disrupts Mrs. Roberts' (Vergara) sex education class, and we see a flashforward to Gilly's death.
38	May 11, 2013	Kristen Wiig	Appeared during Wiig's monologue performance alongside Lorne Michaels.
46	March 27, 2021	Maya Rudolph	Appeared in the prerecorded "The Maya-ing" sketch, where she is shown as the Grady twins from The Shining.

== Angie Tempura ==
Michaela Watkins appears on Weekend Update as a snarky blogger for gossip website bitchpleeze.com.

Appearances

Season	Episode	Host	Notes
34	February 14, 2009	Alec Baldwin	
34	April 11, 2009	Zac Efron	

== Game Time with Randy And Greg ==
Kenan Thompson and Bill Hader star in these sketches, in which sports presenter Randy Dukes desperately tries to convince the audience that his co-host, Greg, is not an alien, despite everything in Greg's behavior proving otherwise.

Appearances

Season	Episode	Host	Notes
34	March 7, 2009	Dwayne Johnson	"Game Time with Dave and Greg" : Greg's first co-presenter is Dave Delmani, played by Dwayne Johnson. Randy Dukes is a guest in the end of the sketch.
35	October 17, 2009	Gerard Butler	Randy's first appearance as a presenter
35	January 30, 2010	Jon Hamm	

== Hamilton ==
Hamilton, played by Will Forte, is a creepy man with a soft-spoken voice, blonde bob cut and large round sunglasses, who commandeers the microphone at various events. For some reason, women find him irresistibly alluring.

Appearances

Season	Episode	Host	Notes
34	December 13, 2008	Hugh Laurie	At a wedding, Hamilton toasts the bride and groom before lamenting the recent election of President Obama. (Hamilton was not named in this episode.)
34	May 16, 2009	Will Ferrell	At a funeral, Hamilton speaks about the recent deaths of his cousin and mother before excoriating the policies of President Obama. (Hamilton was not named in this episode.)
35	October 10, 2009	Drew Barrymore	At a book reading by Debbie Turner (Barrymore), who has written a memoir ("Living With The Devil") of her incredibly unhealthy yet passionate relationship with Hamilton, he appears and convinces her (by singing the Usher song "Love in This Club") to give him another chance.
35	April 24, 2010	Gabourey Sidibe	At a public event featuring Sidibe (playing herself), her former lover Hamilton shows up to ask for her hand in marriage.
37	May 12, 2012	Will Ferrell	Hamilton offers a toast at a dinner for a 25th wedding anniversary. (NOTE: Forte had left the cast by this point, and was just coming back for a cameo)
49	April 6, 2024	Kristen Wiig	Hamilton offers a toast at a retirement party. (NOTE: Forte had left the cast by this point, and was just coming back for a cameo)

The dress rehearsal for the March 6, 2010, episode featured a sketch in which Hamilton interrupted a lesbian wedding to beg one of the brides for a second chance; the sketch was cut from the live episode.

Preceded by Recurring Saturday Night Live characters and sketches introduced 2007–08	Recurring Saturday Night Live characters and sketches (listed chronologically)	Succeeded by Recurring Saturday Night Live characters and sketches introduced 2009–10
