= Saturday Night Live season 38 =

38th season of the show

Saturday Night Live
- Season 38
- No. of episodes: 21

Release
- Original network: NBC
- Original release: September 15, 2012 – May 18, 2013

Season chronology
- ← Previous season 37 Next → season 39

The thirty-eighth season of Saturday Night Live, an American sketch comedy series, originally aired in the United States on NBC between September 15, 2012, and May 18, 2013.

Also airing this season were two election-themed episodes of Saturday Night Live Weekend Update Thursday, which aired on September 20, 2012, and September 27, 2012. Two months before the season premiere, original writer and occasional featured player Tom Davis died after a two-year battle with throat and neck cancer.

== Cast ==
Prior to the start of the season, longtime cast members Andy Samberg and Kristen Wiig, both of whom had been on the show for seven seasons since 2005, decided not to return following the end of the previous season. Following Samberg and Wiig's departures, Abby Elliott was let go after four seasons on the show since 2008. Vanessa Bayer, Taran Killam, and Jay Pharoah were all upgraded to repertory status, while Kate McKinnon remained a featured player.

To fill the void, the show hired three new cast members – Chicago improvisers Aidy Bryant, Tim Robinson, and Cecily Strong – as the replacements for Wiig, Samberg, and Elliott. According to the official press release, "Bryant trained at the iO Chicago, Annoyance Theatre and she was also part of the ensemble that performed on the Second City E.T.C Stage. Robinson also trained at the Second City, he performed on their Mainstage and was also part of their National Touring Company. Like Robinson, Strong had also performed as part of the National Touring Company and trained at the iO Theater".

This was the final season for longtime cast members Fred Armisen, Bill Hader, and Jason Sudeikis. Armisen had been on the show for 11 seasons since 2002, Sudeikis had been on for 10 since 2003 (two as a writer, and nine as a cast member), and Hader had been on for eight since 2005. This would also be the only season for featured player Tim Robinson, who would leave his spot in the cast to instead join the writing staff the following season.

Jay Pharoah debuted his Barack Obama impersonation this season, taking over the role from Armisen.

=== Cast roster ===
**Repertory players**

- Fred Armisen
- Vanessa Bayer
- Bill Hader
- Taran Killam
- **Seth Meyers**
- Bobby Moynihan
- Nasim Pedrad
- Jay Pharoah
- Jason Sudeikis
- Kenan Thompson

**Featured players**

- Aidy Bryant
- Kate McKinnon
- Tim Robinson
- Cecily Strong

bold denotes Weekend Update anchor

== Writers ==
Starting with this season, writing supervisor Colin Jost (who has been writing for the show since 2005) is named as the show's co-head writer, alongside Seth Meyers (Jost had previously been writing supervisor for the past three seasons).

Additionally, prior to the start of the season, Upright Citizens Brigade Theater performers Josh Patten and Neil Casey joined the writing staff (though this would be Casey's only season with the show).

Also, starting with this season, Marika Sawyer (who had been writing on SNL since 2006) is named as the show's co-writing supervisor, alongside Bryan Tucker.

This was also the final season for longtime writer Jim Downey (who had been writing for the show on-and-off since 1977), as he retired at the end of the season, after 30 non-consecutive years with the show. Downey is the longest-tenured writer in the show's history.

== Episodes ==
No. overall	No. in season	Host	Musical guest(s)	Original release date	Ratings/ Share
725	1	Seth MacFarlane	Frank Ocean	September 15, 2012	4.8/12
Frank Ocean performs "Thinkin Bout You" and the second half/single version of "Pyramids". John Mayer plays guitar on both songs.; In the opening monologue, MacFarlane utilizes his character voices of Peter, Stewie & Brian Griffin and Glenn Quagmire from Family Guy, and Roger Smith from American Dad! He also does the voices of George Takei, Droopy the Dog, Marty McFly and Kermit the Frog.; Psy appears in the "Gangnam Style" sketch alongside Bobby Moynihan's impersonation.; Starting with this episode, Jay Pharoah takes over impersonating President Barack Obama from Fred Armisen.; Aidy Bryant, Tim Robinson and Cecily Strong's first episode as cast members.
726	2	Joseph Gordon-Levitt	Mumford & Sons	September 22, 2012	5.0/12
Mumford & Sons performs "I Will Wait" and "Below My Feet" and appears in the Song Memories sketch in which the band performs "You've Got to Hide Your Love Away" as a Beatles tribute band.
727	3	Daniel Craig	Muse	October 6, 2012	4.5/11
Muse performs "Madness" and "Panic Station".; Chris Parnell reprises his Jim Lehrer impression in the cold open.; Caroll Spinney appears as Big Bird on Weekend Update.
728	4	Christina Applegate	Passion Pit	October 13, 2012	4.6/11
Passion Pit performs "Take a Walk" and "Carried Away".; Usain Bolt appears in the cold open and "The Californians" sketch.; Aidy Bryant does not appear in this episode, but is credited in the opening montage.
729	5	Bruno Mars	Bruno Mars	October 20, 2012	5.4/14
Bruno Mars performs "Locked Out of Heaven" and "Young Girls".; Tom Hanks appears in the cold open, introduces Mars' first musical performance and appears in the "Merryville Brothers" sketch.; Bill Hader introduces Mars' second musical performance as Stefon.
730	6	Louis C.K.	fun.	November 3, 2012	5.0/12
fun. performs "Some Nights" and "Carry On".; Tim Robinson does not appear in this episode, but is credited in the opening montage.
731	7	Anne Hathaway	Rihanna	November 10, 2012	5.0/12
Rihanna performs "Diamonds" and "Stay".
732	8	Jeremy Renner	Maroon 5	November 17, 2012	5.1/12
Maroon 5 performs "One More Night" and "Daylight". Additionally, Adam Levine appears in "The Stand-Off" sketch, which was pre-recorded.; New Jersey Governor Chris Christie appears on Weekend Update.; This episode contains a cartoon, entitled "Cool Drones", animated by Augenblick Studios.
733	9	Jamie Foxx	Ne-Yo	December 8, 2012	4.6/11
Ne-Yo performs "Let Me Love You (Until You Learn to Love Yourself)" and "She Is".; 2 Chainz appears during Foxx's monologue.; Dermot Mulroney appears in the "Dylan McDermott or Dermot Mulroney" sketch.; Charlie Day appears in the "Maine Justice" sketch.
734	10	Martin Short	Paul McCartney	December 15, 2012	5.1/12
Paul McCartney performs "My Valentine" with Joe Walsh on guitar, "Cut Me Some Slack" with the surviving members of Nirvana (Dave Grohl, Krist Novoselic, and Pat Smear), and "Wonderful Christmastime". McCartney also appears in the "Pageant Auditions" sketch.; Short brings back his characters Jackie Rogers Jr. and Ed Grimley (which he performs in a part of his monologue).; Jimmy Fallon, Tina Fey, Tom Hanks, Samuel L. Jackson, Paul Shaffer, and Kristen Wiig appear in the opening monologue.; Alec Baldwin appears as Tony Bennett in "The Tony Bennett Show" sketch.; Carrie Brownstein and Samuel L. Jackson appear in "What Up with That?", in which Martin Short reprises his Jackie Rogers Jr. character.; Patricia Clarkson and writer Jim Downey appear in the cut-for-time pre-recorded "Malibu High" sketch.; At the beginning of the show, in lieu of the traditional cold open, the New York City Children's Chorus performs a rendition of "Silent Night" in remembrance of the victims of the Sandy Hook Elementary School shooting, which had occurred a day earlier. The choir also joins McCartney on "Wonderful Christmastime".
735	11	Jennifer Lawrence	The Lumineers	January 19, 2013	4.9/12
The Lumineers performs "Ho Hey" and "Stubborn Love".
736	12	Adam Levine	Kendrick Lamar	January 26, 2013	5.0/12
Kendrick Lamar performs "Swimming Pools (Drank)" and "Poetic Justice" and appears in the SNL Digital Short.; Cameron Diaz, Andy Samberg and Jerry Seinfeld appear in the opening monologue. Samberg also appears in the SNL Digital Short.; Akiva Schaffer, Jorma Taccone and Danny McBride appear in the SNL Digital Short.; Levine's Maroon 5 bandmate Mickey Madden appears in the "Band Face-Off" sketch.
737	13	Justin Bieber	Justin Bieber	February 9, 2013	4.9/12
Justin Bieber performs the acoustic version of "As Long as You Love Me" with guitarist Dan Kanter and "Nothing Like Us".; Whoopi Goldberg appears in the opening monologue and introduces Bieber's first performance.; Jason Sudekis introduces Bieber's second musical performance.
738	14	Christoph Waltz	Alabama Shakes	February 16, 2013	4.6/12
Alabama Shakes performs "Hold On" and "Always Alright".
739	15	Kevin Hart	Macklemore and Ryan Lewis	March 2, 2013	4.8/12
Macklemore and Ryan Lewis perform "Thrift Shop" with Wanz and "Can't Hold Us" with Ray Dalton.; Longtime announcer Don Pardo was unavailable due to a broken hip. Instead, former cast member Darrell Hammond fills in as announcer (Hammond would become the permanent announcer upon Pardo's death in 2014.)
740	16	Justin Timberlake	Justin Timberlake	March 9, 2013	5.9/15
Justin Timberlake performs "Suit & Tie" with Jay-Z and "Mirrors".; Dan Aykroyd, Alec Baldwin, Candice Bergen, Chevy Chase, Tom Hanks, Steve Martin, Martin Short, Paul Simon and future cast member Mike O'Brien appear in the "Five-Timers Club" opening monologue. Aykroyd and Martin reprise the characters "The Festrunk Brothers" in the "It's a Date" sketch. Short, Martin, and Chase also introduce Timberlake's second number as the Three Amigos.; Andy Samberg appears in "It's a Date" and "Maine Justice". "It's a Date" was written by Samberg along with former SNL writers Akiva Schaffer and Jorma Taccone of The Lonely Island.
741	17	Melissa McCarthy	Phoenix	April 6, 2013	4.8/12
Phoenix performs "Entertainment" and a medley of "Trying to Be Cool" and "Drakkar Noir".; Dennis Rodman appears in the cold opening.; Peter Dinklage appears on Weekend Update.
742	18	Vince Vaughn	Miguel	April 13, 2013	4.6/12
Miguel performs "Adorn" and "How Many Drinks?"; Steve Jones appears in the pre-recorded "History of Punk" sketch.
743	19	Zach Galifianakis	Of Monsters and Men	May 4, 2013	4.4/11
Of Monsters and Men performs "Little Talks" and "Mountain Sound".; Nikolaj Coster-Waldau cameos in the "Game of Game of Thrones" sketch.; Galifianakis's co-stars from The Hangover series, Bradley Cooper and Ed Helms, appear in the Jennifer Aniston lookalike sketch.; Jon Hamm appears in the pre-recorded edited version of the Darrell's House sketch.
744	20	Kristen Wiig	Vampire Weekend	May 11, 2013	4.6/12
Vampire Weekend performs "Diane Young" and "Unbelievers".; Jonah Hill and Maya Rudolph appear in the opening monologue.; Rudolph also appears in "The Californians".; Kristen Wiig reprised her roles as Gilly in a pre-taped portion of the monologue, Kareena (of The Californians), Kat (of Garth and Kat) on Weekend Update, the Target Lady, and Dooneese, one of the Finger Lakes singers.; Aidy Bryant introduces Vampire Weekend's second performance with Wiig.
745	21	Ben Affleck	Kanye West	May 18, 2013	4.7/12
Kanye West performs "Black Skinhead" and "New Slaves".; Affleck's then wife, Jennifer Garner, appears in the opening monologue.; Amy Poehler returns to Weekend Update for a segment of "Really?!? with Seth & Amy" and resumes her co-anchor duties.; Anderson Cooper appears on Weekend Update for a pre-taped sketch involving recurring character Stefon.; Kim Gordon, Steve Jones, Aimee Mann, J Mascis, Michael Penn and Fred Armisen's Portlandia co-star Carrie Brownstein appear in his final sketch, "It's a Lovely Day."; Fred Armisen, Bill Hader, Tim Robinson, and Jason Sudeikis's final episode as cast members.

== Specials ==
Title	Original release date	US viewers (millions)
"Saturday Night Live Christmas"	November 28, 2012	7.36
A collection of memorable holiday-themed sketches from past and present eras. Sketches include: "Santa's My Boyfriend", Jimmy Fallon's Christmas song monologue, "Turner Classic Movies presents: This, You Call a Wonderful Life", "The Mark Jensen Family Christmas Special", Garrett Morris' performance of "Winter Wonderland," "Glengarry Glen Santa's Workshop," "Steve Martin's Holiday Wish," Weekend Update: Adam Sandler's ""The Chanukah Song" from the season 20 episode hosted by Roseanne Barr, "Homelessville Mascot vs. Salvation Army Santa," Robert De Niro's monologue from season 30 (featuring an appearance by Kermit the Frog), "TV Funhouse: Christmastime for the Jews," Weekend Update: Stefon's Christmas Clubs from the season 37 episode hosted by Katy Perry, John Malkovich's monologue from season 34, the "Dick in a Box" Digital Short from the season 32 episode hosted by Justin Timberlake, "Consumer Probe," "Michael Buble's Holiday Duets," "The Vogelchecks' Christmas," "Martha Stewart's Topless Holiday Special," "Robert Goulet's Christmas Special," Weekend Update: Drunk Uncle Rambles About the Holidays, "What Up with That?" from the season 35 episode hosted by James Franco, "NPR: Schweddy Balls", "Mary Katherine Gallagher in the School Choir," and "Seasons Greetings From Saturday Night Live" from the season 26 episode hosted by Lucy Liu.

=== Saturday Night Live Weekend Update Thursday ===
The third season of Saturday Night Live Weekend Update Thursday, a limited-run series based on Saturday Night Live's "Weekend Update" sketch, has aired in conjunction with this season. The specials focused on the United States presidential election. The show was hosted by Seth Meyers, Update's then current host.

Title	Original release date	US viewers (millions)
"Season 3, Episode 1"	September 20, 2012	5.15
"Season 3, Episode 2"	September 27, 2012	4.67
