= Stefon =

Saturday Night Live character portrayed by Bill Hader

- Saturday Night Live character
- Stefon, portrayed by Bill Hader
- First appearance: November 1, 2008
- Last appearance: May 18, 2013 (regular); March 17, 2018 (guest)
- Created by: Bill Hader; John Mulaney
- Portrayed by: Bill Hader; Edward Norton (SNL40)

In-universe information
- Gender: Male
- Title: City Correspondent
- Occupation: Filmmaker; Correspondent for SNL's Weekend Update
- Family: David Zolesky (brother)
- Spouse: Seth Meyers (m. 2013)
- Significant others: Derek Zoolander (2011); Anderson Cooper (2013)
- Children: 1 (unnamed son)
- Nationality: American

Stefon Meyers (né Zolesky (Note: In his debut appearance, Stefon and his brother David were referred to as the Zolesky Brothers.)) is a fictional character portrayed by Bill Hader on the American sketch-comedy television show Saturday Night Live (SNL). Created by Hader and writer John Mulaney, Stefon is based on people Hader and Mulaney encountered in their daily lives, including a club promoter and a barista. Stefon first appeared in the sketch "Movie Pitch with Stefon" on the November 1, 2008, episode hosted by Ben Affleck, later becoming a recurring character on Weekend Update from 2010 until 2013.

Stefon is described as a "city correspondent"; when asked about recommendations for events and destinations in New York City, Stefon suggests unusual nightclubs and parties with bizarre characters and themes. The character is also shown to be infatuated with the Weekend Update anchor, Seth Meyers, and in his final appearance as a recurring character, the two proclaimed their love for each other. Because lines for Weekend Update are read from cue cards, Mulaney constantly changed the script prior to the live broadcast to make Hader break character.

Widely regarded as Hader's most memorable character on Saturday Night Live, Stefon has become a fan favorite and has made multiple guest appearances since Hader left the show; however, the character has also been criticized due to his stereotypical nature.

== Development and production ==
Stefon was created by American sketch-comedy television show Saturday Night Live (SNL) cast member Bill Hader and writer John Mulaney. The character was inspired by people Hader and Mulaney had encountered in their daily lives; these include a club promoter who sent Mulaney an e-mail about a club that "had everything", including "rooms full of broken glass" as a highlight. His voice and mannerisms are based on those of a barista at a Chelsea, Manhattan, coffee shop Hader frequented. Mulaney took inspiration for Stefon's look from 2000s club fashion and the 2003 film Party Monster. He chose an Ed Hardy shirt because he assumed it would look like the fashion from the film.

Stefon was originally written for a sketch for the November 1, 2008, SNL episode hosted by Ben Affleck. In the sketch, Stefon and Affleck's character, David Zolesky, were pitching a film to a studio. It was well received, leading Hader and Mulaney to write a similar sketch featuring Stefon when Bradley Cooper hosted the show. The reception for the new sketch was more adverse when it played at dress rehearsal. This made them feel that the character was not working, with Mulaney remarking that there were too many individuals for a skit centered on a single character. Doug Abeles, the head writer of Saturday Night Live's satirical news segment Weekend Update, suggested that the character should be introduced as a correspondent on the feature instead. During production of the character's first appearance on Weekend Update, Mulaney assumed the character would be cut after rehearsal, but Stefon was positively received and was invited to reappear two shows later.

Hader and Mulaney together created the character's idiosyncratic manner, including his exuberant descriptions of fictional nightclubs. They wrote long scripts so SNL head writer and Weekend Update anchor Seth Meyers could pick which jokes to include. Mulaney said that the eventual format of Stefon's club recommendations was inspired by how the character proposed his ideas in the initial 2008 skit. Hader described his role in the writing process for the character as an "editor" and would pitch parts that included odd voices. Mulaney left SNL in 2012 but periodically returned to write the character's lines.

After the dress rehearsal for Stefon's first appearance on Weekend Update, a line from the script had to be changed because it received no response. As the lines for Weekend Update are read from cue cards, Hader, who was unaware of the change during the show, broke character. Mulaney was amused by this and decided to continue to change the script before the live broadcast to make Hader laugh. To make sure Hader did not stumble on his lines, Mulaney would tell him the new jokes shortly before he entered the set. Mulaney characterized getting Hader to crack as a "group effort", adding that cast member Andy Samberg would stand near the camera, cross his hands, and look at Hader, tempting him to laugh. Hader also attributed his frequent corpsing as Stefon to the character's animated personality, which made him immerse himself in the role and lose his composure. Despite Stefon's popularity among fans, Hader felt pressure while portraying the role, as he often struggled to stay in character.

Due to Hader leaving SNL at the end of the 2012–2013 season, he and Mulaney arranged plans for Stefon's final appearance. Hader had written notes the year prior for it to be a prerecorded sketch where Meyers interrupts Stefon's wedding with journalist Anderson Cooper, similar to the 1967 film The Graduate. The idea was not enthusiastically received by the staff, including SNL creator and producer Lorne Michaels, due to them believing that Stefon worked better as a live sketch. Meyers instead recommended that Stefon appear on Weekend Update as usual before the character flees, followed by the original skit for a sense of surprise. Another suggestion for Stefon's final appearance was for him to board a spaceship and return to his home planet with his boyfriend, but this was abandoned in favor of the initial idea. Rhys Thomas directed the taped sketch, which was filmed on Tuesday before the show.

== Character ==
Introduced as a "city correspondent", Stefon appears on Weekend Update to recommend unusual destinations for tourists travelling to New York. He starts the recommendations with the phrase "New York's hottest club" and continues with the description of the club, usually containing odd personalities such as "leprechauns that look like Farrah Fawcett", "a doorman who always high-fives children of divorce", or various types of midgets described as human objects, such as "human DVRs" or "human piñatas". Stefon wears long-sleeved Ed Hardy shirts and has an asymmetrical, highlighted haircut. In his appearances on Weekend Update, Stefon claims that his mother goes by the name Ms. Stefon, his father is English musician David Bowie, he lives in a trash can outside a RadioShack store at the corner of 23rd Street and 7th Avenue in Manhattan, and he has a dog named Bark Ruffalo.

Stefon has a nervous and palpable personality and often touches his face. Tess Lynch, writing for Grantland, characterized Stefon's persona as intriguingly relatable. She noted his eagerness to suggest offbeat clubs, juxtaposed with an underlying apprehension. Stefon is shown to be infatuated with Meyers; he expresses disappointment when Meyers mentions his girlfriend and calls for the audience's pity. According to Mulaney, he thought it was reasonable that Stefon would be attracted to Meyers, so he and Hader created Stefon's romance one joke at a time. Hader also expressed that the character's sexuality did not matter to the sketch, stating, "He was just bad at his job and did a lot of drugs, [...]. And then of course he would be into Seth [Meyers], and Seth wouldn't like him, so it was just organic that this relationship happened."

In the book Saturday Night Live and Philosophy: Deep Thoughts Through the Decades, Kati Sudnick and Erik Garrett mention Stefon as an example of the issues of a technocratic elite. They stated that "[o]ur inability to understand most of Stefon's terms illustrates how the public is at the mercy of these experts. For example, when we hear from economic forecasters predicting an economic slump, we trust them even when we don't understand them." According to anthropologists Britt E. Halvorson and Joshua O. Reno in their book Imagining the Heartland: White Supremacy and the American Midwest, the character's absurdity highlights the divide between open-minded and narrow-minded perspectives. Additionally, they describe the sketch as fitting a form of homonationalism, which is characterized by the inclusion of queer subjects through racial and national differences.

== Appearances ==
=== Saturday Night Live ===
Stefon debuted in a sketch in 2008 as the brother of Ben Affleck's more serious character, David Zolesky; the character was then introduced as a correspondent on Weekend Update the following season in 2010. Stefon returned during the season 35 finale of SNL, two episodes after his initial appearance, and the fourth episode of season 36 hosted by Emma Stone. Stefon appeared on Weekend Update again during an episode hosted by Paul Rudd in December 2010, where the character performed an altered version of "The Twelve Days of Christmas" as part of his appearance, and the next episode, where he performed "O Christmas Tree" with other recurring characters, David Paterson (Fred Armisen) and Snooki (Bobby Moynihan). The next year, Stefon showed up in an episode hosted by Russell Brand, when he recommended Valentine's Day destinations, as well as another episode presented by Tina Fey. Stefon made a short appearance in the season 36 finale of SNL, where he and Meyers sign off Weekend Update.

On the third episode of season 37, Stefon appeared with the character Derek Zoolander (Ben Stiller) from the eponymous film. He also made an appearance in the Katy Perry episode as well as its promos. Stefon made a short cameo appearance with singer-songwriter Paul Simon in the monologue of the 2012 episode hosted by Maya Rudolph, and in the Weekend Update segment of the Jonah Hill episode, Stefon kissed Meyers for the first time. The character made another appearance in the season 37 finale, the Bruno Mars episode of season 38, where he suggested Halloween-related activities in New York City, and in the episode hosted by Justin Timberlake.

The character made his last recurring appearance on Weekend Update at the end of season 38 because Hader was leaving SNL. Former Weekend Update co-anchor Amy Poehler made a guest appearance for a "Really?!?" segment with Meyers before Stefon emerged, expressing disapproval of Poehler. After Stefon's usual comment on "New York's hottest club", Meyers criticized his recommendations, making Stefon flee NBC Studios to get married. After Poehler advised Meyers to follow Stefon, Meyers pursued Stefon to the wedding at the Marble Collegiate Church on Fifth Avenue but found Stefon was marrying journalist Anderson Cooper. Seth enters the church, finds Stefon, and takes him back to Studio 8H, where they proclaim their love for each other. The guests at the wedding include many of the idiosyncratic people Stefon has mentioned during his Weekend Update segments. Ben Affleck made a cameo appearance, reprising his role as David Zolesky from Stefon's debut sketch. After Seth and Stefon return to the studio, characters from Weekend Update gather to congratulate them. The wedding segment is a reference to the 1967 film The Graduate. (Note: CNN said the segment is a parody of Wayne's World 2 (1993), which references The Graduate.)

In February 2014, Stefon returned to Weekend Update as a guest along with Amy Poehler to bid farewell to Meyers in his final Weekend Update as Meyers prepared to become the new host of Late Night. During Hader's first time hosting of SNL the same year, Stefon returned to Weekend Update, hosted by Colin Jost and Michael Che, to recommend New York clubs for tourists interested in autumn activities and ended the sketch by announcing his pregnancy. As part of the Weekend Update segment of the Saturday Night Live 40th Anniversary Special in 2015, Edward Norton portrayed Stefon but was confronted by the real Stefon (portrayed by Hader) and Meyers. On Hader's second time hosting in 2018, Stefon returned to Weekend Update for a St. Patrick's Day-themed segment of New York City recommendations. Stefon, who usually uses the term "midget" to describe his bizarre recommendations, did not use the term to avoid being insensitive; he consulted his attorney and "conceptual piss artist" Shy (John Mulaney) for a better term, ultimately using "little people".

During an interview with The Guardian in 2022, Hader said SNL had suggested he reprise the role, but he declined due to the political climate at the time and fearing that the character could be seen as stereotypical. In an interview with The Independent the following year, Hader stated he was open to playing Stefon again, saying that he had not met anyone who was offended by the character.

=== Outside Saturday Night Live ===
In December 2011, Hader (as Stefon) and Seth Meyers made an appearance at the benefit concert A Funny Affair for Autism, where Stefon gave club recommendations for Christmas. The pair also made an appearance on the 2012 edition of Night of Too Many Stars.

When Late Night with Seth Meyers premiered on February 24, 2014, a Stefon matryoshka doll was unveiled as part of the decor of Meyers's desk.

=== Unproduced movie ===
Paramount Pictures began discussions for a feature film featuring Stefon. The film was intended to be a mockumentary in which Stefon would visit New York hotspots as a correspondent for Weekend Update. Meyers had pitched that the movie would start with his character dead since he assumed he would not be starring in the film, and Mulaney wanted director Garry Marshall to portray SNL creator and producer Lorne Michaels. Hader and Mulaney later rejected the offer because, according to Hader, "in [their] mind, it never worked as a sketch".

== Reception ==
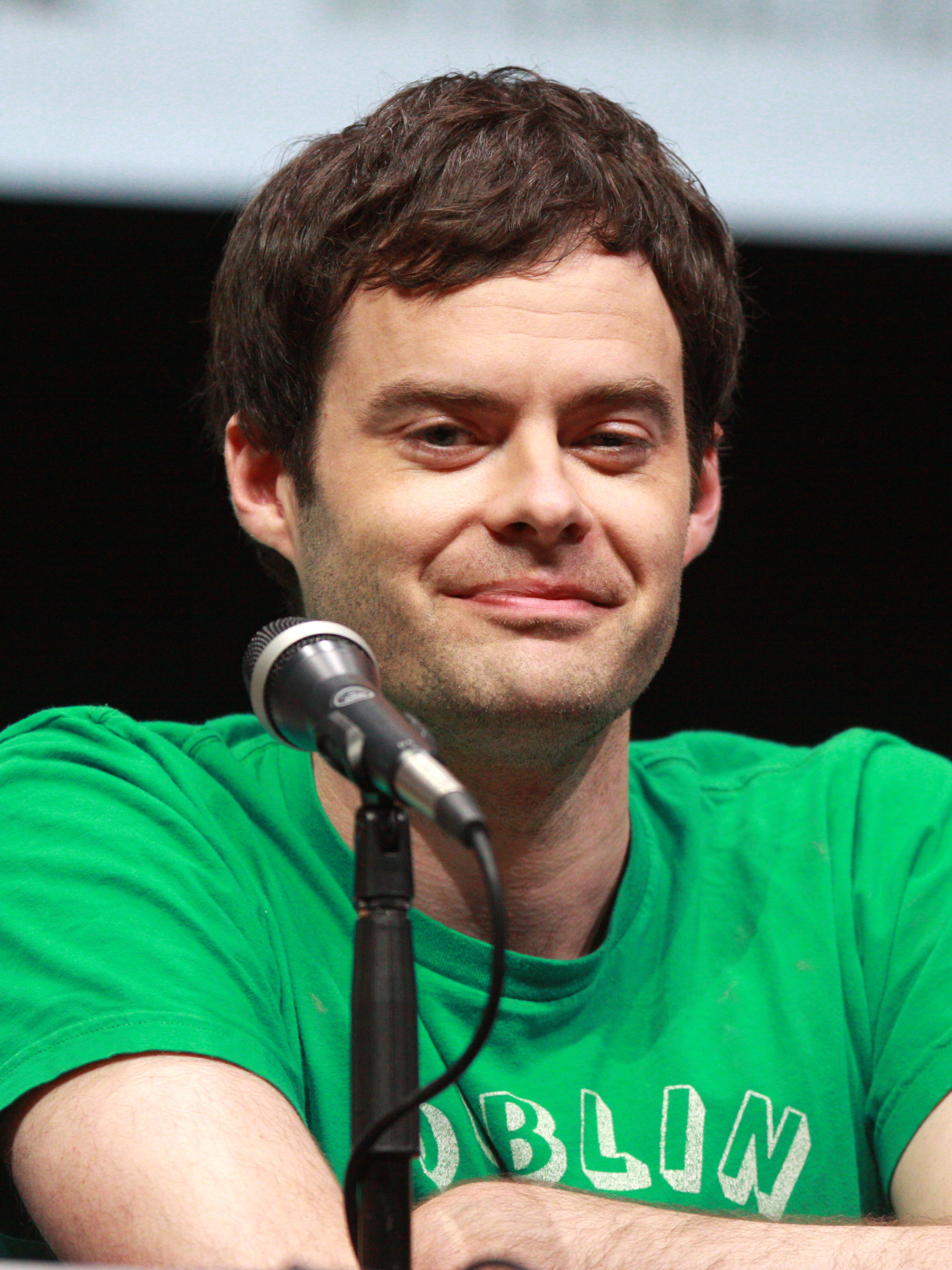
Stefon has been considered Bill Hader's (pictured in 2013) most memorable character on Saturday Night Live.

Stefon has had a generally positive reception, with James Poniewozik of Time describing it as one of the best contemporary SNL skits. David Reddish of Queerty wrote that he loved Stefon "in all his messy, gay glory" and that "even though Hader is straight, he made the character vulnerable and lovable". David Sims of The A.V. Club and Daniel Holloway of Variety said Stefon was one of the few recurring characters they never grew tired of. Tess Lynch of Grantland and Laura Bennett of The New Republic said Meyers and Stefon's chemistry made the character stand out. According to Jordan Crucchiola of Wired, Stefon was "too funny to let go of", and Brian Welk of TheWrap said that although Stefon often covers his face with his hands due to Hader breaking, it has made the character "forever endearing". Stefon's final appearance as a recurring character on Weekend Update also received praise. Zack Sharf of IndieWire considered it "one of the best sketches in recent SNL history", while Erik Voss of Vulture said there was "no better sendoff than a gay wedding between Stefon and Seth Meyers".

Stefon has become a fan favorite and has been considered to be Hader's most memorable character on Saturday Night Live. During one of the character's earlier appearances, Ken Tucker from Entertainment Weekly observed that the character had quickly garnered widespread adoration. The character has been included in many lists of the best Saturday Night Live characters, ranking first in Rolling Stone's as well as TVLine's, second on MovieWeb's, and third on Entertainment Weekly's. Hader has frequently been approached by fans who claim to know someone who acts like Stefon. Due to the character's popularity, numerous online users have quoted him and written fan fiction about him.

Joe Reid of Polygon thought that the character being written by Mulaney, who is a straight man, might be the reason why the gay community never embraced him. Joanna Campbell, the former executive director of Little People of America, has criticized the character's derogatory use of the term "midget". Hader has since expressed his regret for using the word.

== See also ==
- List of recurring Saturday Night Live characters and sketches (introduced 2008–2009)
