= Saturday Night Live season 36 =

Saturday Night Live
- Season 36
- No. of episodes: 22

Release
- Original network: NBC
- Original release: September 25, 2010 – May 21, 2011

Season chronology
- ← Previous season 35 Next → season 37

The thirty-sixth season of Saturday Night Live, an American sketch comedy series, originally aired in the United States on NBC between September 25, 2010, and May 21, 2011.

Longtime announcer Don Pardo announced that he would pre-record his parts from his home in Arizona rather than perform live in New York City.

== Cast ==
Prior to the start of the season, longtime cast member Will Forte left the show after a total of eight seasons from 2002 to 2010. Featured player Jenny Slate was then let go from the show after one season. Abby Elliott and Bobby Moynihan were both upgraded to repertory status, while Nasim Pedrad remained a featured player.

Following Forte and Slate's departures, the show hired four new cast members: ImprovOlympic alumni Vanessa Bayer and Paul Brittain, stand-up comic and impressionist Jay Pharoah, and comedic actor Taran Killam of The Groundlings. Killam is the second cast member after Kenan Thompson to be a cast member on a Nickelodeon kids' sketch show (The Amanda Show) and the second cast member after Jeff Richards to be a cast member on MADtv.

=== Cast roster ===
**Repertory players**

- Fred Armisen
- Abby Elliott
- Bill Hader
- **Seth Meyers**
- Bobby Moynihan
- Andy Samberg
- Jason Sudeikis
- Kenan Thompson
- Kristen Wiig

**Featured players**

- Vanessa Bayer
- Paul Brittain
- Taran Killam
- Nasim Pedrad
- Jay Pharoah

bold denotes Weekend Update anchor

== Writers ==
In August 2010, Michaels hired Second City Theater writers Tom Flanigan and Shelly Gossman. Portlandia co-creator Jonathan Krisel joined the staff as a writer, producer, and creative collaborator on several Digital Shorts. Heather Anne Campbell, a performer from the Upright Citizens Brigade Theatre in Los Angeles, was also added to the writing staff. Sarah Schneider, a regular writer and performer for CollegeHumor, was a guest writer for the last five episodes of the season before joining full-time for season 37.

This was also the final season for longtime writer/Lonely Island member Akiva Schaffer (a role he had been in since 2005), as he left the show, after six years, but would contribute to SNL Digital Shorts over the following season.

Additionally, this was the final season for longtime Weekend Update writer Doug Abeles (who had written for the segment since 2001), as he left the show after 10 years; as well as Simon Rich (who previously joined the writing staff in 2007), as he left after four years.

== Episodes ==
No. overall	No. in season	Host	Musical guest(s)	Original release date	Ratings/ Share
681	1	Amy Poehler	Katy Perry	September 25, 2010	5.3/13
Katy Perry performs "California Gurls" and "Teenage Dream", and appears in Bronx Beat and the SNL Digital Short. Back-up dancer Kherington Payne appears in both of Perry's performances.; Rachel Dratch, Jimmy Fallon, Tina Fey, and Justin Timberlake appear in the opening monologue. Timberlake also appears in the "Actor II Actor" sketch.; Maya Rudolph appears in the Bronx Beat sketch, reprising her role as Jodi Deitz.; New York Governor David Paterson appears on Weekend Update, alongside Fred Armisen's portrayal of Paterson.; Peter Sarsgaard appears in the SNL Digital Short.; Amy Poehler reprises her roles as Betty Caruso and Amber.; Vanessa Bayer, Paul Brittain, Taran Killam, and Jay Pharoah's first episode as cast members.
682	2	Bryan Cranston	Kanye West	October 2, 2010	4.8/12
Kanye West performs "Power" and "Runaway". Pusha T performs with him on the second song.; Ernest Borgnine and Morgan Freeman appear in the "What Up with That?" sketch; this would be the last live-action television appearance for Borgnine before his death in 2012.; Helen Mirren appears in the SNL Digital Short.
683	3	Jane Lynch	Bruno Mars	October 9, 2010	4.8/12
Bruno Mars performs "Just the Way You Are" and a medley of the songs "Nothin' on You" and "Grenade".; Kristen Wiig received a Primetime Emmy Award nomination for Outstanding Supporting Actress in a Comedy Series for this episode.
684	4	Emma Stone	Kings of Leon	October 23, 2010	4.5/11
Kings of Leon performs "Radioactive" and "Pyro".; SNL writer John Mulaney appears on a Weekend Update segment called "I Love It".; The song Ta Douleur by Camille is played during the Les jeunes de Paris sketch.
685	5	Jon Hamm	Rihanna	October 30, 2010	4.6/11
Rihanna performs "What's My Name?" and "Only Girl (In the World)" and appears in the SNL Digital Short.; Debut of "Greetings from American America", an animated short created by former SNL head writer Fred Wolf. David Spade provided the voice of a chihuahua in the short.; Writer and future cast member Colin Jost appears in the "Back to the Future" sketch as the scene marker.
686	6	Scarlett Johansson	Arcade Fire	November 13, 2010	4.7/12
Arcade Fire performs "We Used to Wait" and "Sprawl II (Mountains Beyond Mountains)" and appears in the SNL Digital Short. Owen Pallett plays violin during both of Arcade Fire's performances.; Yeah Yeah Yeahs guitarist Nick Zinner plays the synthesizer during Arcade Fire's second performance.
687	7	Anne Hathaway	Florence + the Machine	November 20, 2010	4.7/12
Florence + the Machine performs "Dog Days Are Over" and "You Got the Love".
688	8	Robert De Niro	Diddy-Dirty Money	December 4, 2010	5.0/12
Diddy-Dirty Money performs "Coming Home" and "Ass on the Floor". Additionally, Sean "Diddy" Combs appears in the "Blizzard Man" sketch.; Swizz Beatz performs with Diddy-Dirty Money for their second song; Robin Williams appears in the "What Up with That?" sketch.; Ben Stiller appears in the "Movie Fan" and "It's a Living" sketches.; The episode's final segment features Dana Carvey as the voice of a hippie in an animated short by former SNL writer Fred Wolf.
689	9	Paul Rudd	Paul McCartney	December 11, 2010	5.3/13
Paul McCartney performs "Jet", "Band on the Run", a medley of "A Day in the Life" and "Give Peace a Chance", and as an encore, "Get Back", replacing the extended good-byes. Additionally, McCartney appears in the opening monologue, the SNL Digital Short, and Weekend Update.; Chef Mario Batali appears in the Digital Short.
690	10	Jeff Bridges	Eminem & Lil Wayne	December 18, 2010	4.9/12
For the first set, Eminem and Lil Wayne perform "No Love". For the second set, Eminem performs "Won't Back Down" and Lil Wayne performs "6 Foot 7 Foot".; David Rudman plays Cookie Monster in the opening monologue. Cookie Monster started his own campaign on Facebook, similar to that of Betty White, to audition for SNL the month before, though he did not get the part.; Akon, Jorma Taccone, Akiva Schaffer, John McEnroe, Blake Lively, and Jessica Alba appear in the SNL Digital Short.; At the end of the episode, Bridges exclaimed "Rest in peace, Captain Beefheart!"; Beefheart, who had performed on SNL in 1980, died the day before the episode aired.; Bill Hader suffered a panic attack while impersonating Julian Assange. Hader has opened up about the experience in the years since the incident. Lorne Michaels calmed him down backstage after the sketch telling Hader, “you can work here as long as you want”.
691	11	Jim Carrey	The Black Keys	January 8, 2011	7.8/18
The Black Keys perform "Howlin' for You" and "Tighten Up".; Jim Carrey reprises his Charles Bronson impression from In Living Color.; The start of this broadcast was delayed 20 minutes due to the Colts-Jets AFC wild card game's running long.
692	12	Gwyneth Paltrow	Cee Lo Green	January 15, 2011	5.1/12
Cee Lo Green performs "Forget You" and "Bright Lights Bigger City" and appears in the opening monologue, the "Bar Mitzvah" sketch and the "Forget You" sketch.; Pee-wee Herman and Anderson Cooper appear in the SNL Digital Short.
693	13	Jesse Eisenberg	Nicki Minaj	January 29, 2011	5.1/12
Nicki Minaj performs "Right Thru Me" and "Moment 4 Life" and appears in the SNL Digital Short and the "Bride of Blackenstein" sketch.; Mark Zuckerberg appears in the opening monologue, alongside Andy Samberg's portrayal of Zuckerberg.; Jorma Taccone, Akiva Schaffer, and John Waters appear in the SNL Digital Short.
694	14	Dana Carvey	Linkin Park	February 5, 2011	5.6/13
Linkin Park performs "Waiting for the End" and "When They Come for Me".; Mike Myers appears in the cold open to reprise his role as the title character in a Wayne's World sketch and introduces Linkin Park's second performance.; Jon Lovitz appears in the opening monologue and introduces Linkin Park's second performance.; Justin Bieber appears in Church Chat and a pre-taped parody of The Roommate.; Jesse Eisenberg appears in the pre-recorded "Deidra Wurtz: Downsizing Expert" sketch commercial.; Carvey's sons Dex and Tom appear in the goodnights.; Carvey reprises his characters of Garth Algar and The Church Lady, as well as his impressions of Mickey Rooney and Regis Philbin.
695	15	Russell Brand	Chris Brown	February 12, 2011	5.0/12
Chris Brown performs "Yeah 3x" and "No BS".; As of 2026, due to Brand's copious sexual assault charges and Brown's own legal issues, this episode is widely regarded as the most unfortunate pairing of headliners in the show's history.
696	16	Miley Cyrus	The Strokes	March 5, 2011	5.4/13
The Strokes perform "Under Cover of Darkness" and "Life is Simple in the Moonlight".
697	17	Zach Galifianakis	Jessie J	March 12, 2011	4.8/12
Jessie J performs "Price Tag" with B.o.B and "Mamma Knows Best".; Seth Meyers ends Weekend Update by encouraging viewers to donate to Red Cross relief for the 2011 Tōhoku earthquake and tsunami.; Seth Meyers made an appearance in "The Original Kings of Catchphrase Comedy Tour" sketch as comedian Boston Powers. According to Meyers, it was his first appearance in a sketch in two years.
698	18	Elton John	Elton John	April 2, 2011	5.0/12
Elton John and Leon Russell perform "Hey Ahab" and "Monkey Suit", as well as a post-show encore performance of "The Bitch Is Back", though only John is credited as the official musical guest.; Will Forte appears in the "ESPN Classic" sketch, reprising his role as Greg Stink.; Tom Hanks appears in the "ESPN Classic" sketch, as Michael Caine in the "Knights of the Realm" sketch, and in the SNL Digital Short. Hanks also introduces John and Russell's first performance.; Carmelo Anthony appears in the "ESPN Classic" sketch, the SNL Digital Short and introduces John and Russell's second performance.; Jake Gyllenhaal appears on Weekend Update.
699	19	Helen Mirren	Foo Fighters	April 9, 2011	4.7/12
Foo Fighters performs "Rope" and "Walk". Additionally, Dave Grohl appears in the SNL Digital Short and the "Bongo's Clown Room" sketch.
700	20	Tina Fey	Ellie Goulding	May 7, 2011	5.3/15
Ellie Goulding performs "Lights" and "Your Song".; Maya Rudolph appears in the opening monologue, the "Birthing Seminar" sketch, and the "Googie Rene's Slightly Damaged Prom Wear Barn" sketch.; Darrell Hammond appears as Donald Trump in the "GOP 2012 Undeclared Candidates Debate" sketch.; Michael Bolton, Jorma Taccone, and Akiva Schaffer appear in the SNL Digital Short.; Tina Fey reprises her impersonation of Sarah Palin in the "GOP 2012 Undeclared Candidates Debate" sketch.; Tina Fey received a Primetime Emmy Award nomination for Outstanding Guest Actress in a Comedy Series for this episode.
701	21	Ed Helms	Paul Simon	May 14, 2011	4.9/12
Paul Simon performs "Rewrite" and "So Beautiful or So What" and appears in the "What Up with That?" sketch.; Chris Colfer and Lindsey Buckingham also appear in "What Up with That?".; Jon Hamm, Jimmy Fallon, Stephen Colbert and Steve Carell appear in the pre-filmed live-action segment of The Ambiguously Gay Duo cartoon "The Dark, Clenched Hole of Evil".
702	22	Justin Timberlake	Lady Gaga	May 21, 2011	7.0/17
Lady Gaga performs a medley of "The Edge of Glory" and "Judas" and "Born This Way" and appears in the "Liquorville" sketch, the SNL Digital Short "3-Way (The Golden Rule)", and the "What's That Name?" sketch.; Susan Sarandon and Patricia Clarkson appear in the SNL Digital Short "3-Way (The Golden Rule)", reprising their roles from the "Motherlover" Digital Short.; Bradley Cooper appears on Weekend Update.; Jimmy Fallon appears as Barry Gibb in The Barry Gibb Talk Show sketch.

== Specials ==
Title	Original release date
"The Women of SNL"	November 1, 2010
A collection of past and present sketches highlighting SNL's female cast members, shown as a parody of The Real Housewives reality series. Rachel Dratch, Nora Dunn, Tina Fey, Ana Gasteyer, Jan Hooks, Julia Louis-Dreyfus, Laraine Newman, Cheri Oteri, Amy Poehler, Maya Rudolph, Molly Shannon and Kristen Wiig appeared in new material made exclusively for the special. Andy Cohen made a cameo as the host the special. Originally this special was supposed to air in the previous season but was scrapped and replaced with a special about the history of Saturday Night Live in the 2000s. NBC re-aired the special on May 18, 2014.
"Saturday Night Live Backstage"	February 20, 2011
A documentary showing the creation of a typical Saturday Night Live episode. Originally a special celebrating the 35th anniversary of the show was planned but was scrapped and replaced with this special instead.
