= The Barry Gibb Talk Show =

Recurring sketch on Saturday Night Live

Opening title for The Barry Gibb Talk Show.

The Barry Gibb Talk Show is a recurring sketch on Saturday Night Live about a talk show starring Bee Gees lead singer Barry Gibb (played by Jimmy Fallon) and his brother, Robin Gibb (Justin Timberlake). The sketch was created by writers Ken Scarborough and Steve Higgins based on an idea from Fallon.

The sketch is characterized by Barry Gibb's accent as well as his falsetto voice, which he breaks into randomly while speaking, and his extremely short temper with his guests, usually political figures. Meanwhile, Robin provides lackluster answers to Barry's questions (usually "No. No, I don't"). as well as humorous backup for their call and response falsetto singing, particularly in the opening and closing credits.

The sketch uses the music of the Bee Gees' 1975 song "Nights on Broadway" (with parody lyrics) as its theme.

The real Barry and Robin Gibb joined Fallon and Timberlake to perform on the March 16, 2010, episode of Late Night with Jimmy Fallon.

Robin died in 2012. On December 21, 2013, Barry Gibb and Madonna appeared in the sixth episode of the sketch.

On three occasions that this sketch aired on SNL, the episode's host (Timberlake in 2009 and 2011, Fallon in 2014) won the Primetime Emmy Award for Outstanding Guest Actor in a Comedy Series. Timberlake was nominated for a third award in this category when the sketch aired in 2013. Fallon also won the award in 2012.

== Episodes ==
=== October 11, 2003 ===
Justin Timberlake hosted and performed as the musical guest on the episode containing the premiere of The Barry Gibb Talk Show. Barry's guests included Al Franken (played by Jeff Richards), Arianna Huffington (Rachel Dratch) and the then-Lieutenant Governor of California, Cruz Bustamante (Horatio Sanz). At the time, both Huffington and Bustamante were running for Governor of California amidst the recall election that eventually ousted Gray Davis. The show is memorable for Timberlake's inability to maintain a straight face during Fallon's rantings. He can be seen lowering his head occasionally in an attempt to disguise his laughter. This was the only Barry Gibb Talk Show sketch performed while Fallon was still a cast member.

=== April 9, 2005 ===
Host Cameron Diaz was dating Timberlake at the time. Fallon returned because he was about to premiere in Fever Pitch with Drew Barrymore. Barry's guests were Nancy Pelosi (Diaz), Ann Coulter (Barrymore), and New Mexico Governor Bill Richardson (Sanz).

=== December 16, 2006 ===
In the sketch's third airing, Timberlake hosted for the second time and Fallon returned to portray Barry, whose guests were former Supreme Court justice Sandra Day O'Connor (Kristen Wiig), Thomas Friedman (Fred Armisen), and Jimmy Carter (Darrell Hammond).

=== May 9, 2009 ===
For Timberlake's third hosting turn, Fallon returned to the Barry Gibb role. Barry welcomed Speaker of the House Nancy Pelosi (Kristen Wiig), CNN commentator Roland S. Martin (Kenan Thompson), and NYU Economics Professor Nouriel Roubini (Armisen). The sketch referenced the Shamwow guy.

=== May 21, 2011 ===
Fallon returned for the season finale, Timberlake's fourth hosting turn. Guests included Rachel Maddow (Abby Elliott), Roland S. Martin (Thompson), and Ben Bernanke (Armisen), but the Gibbs spent little time conversing with them except for Bernanke, who occasionally interrupted (drinking water, cell phone ringing). Barry yelled "I survived The Rapture!", referring to the then-recent end of the world predictions. After Robin revives Barry using gold medallions that produce the same result as a defibrillator, the Gibbs close the sketch by rapping the "Rappers Delight" lyrics over the closing theme.

=== December 21, 2013 ===
Fallon hosted while Timberlake was the musical guest for the episode. Guests included Megyn Kelly (Cecily Strong), Paul Ryan (Taran Killam), and Madonna (as herself). At the end of the sketch the real Barry Gibb made an appearance, singing and dancing with Fallon and Timberlake, comically pointing to Fallon's chest hair at "Talkin’ about chest hair. Talkin’ about crazy cool medallions!"

=== January 27, 2024 ===
Timberlake was the musical guest for the episode hosted by Dakota Johnson. Fallon returned to cameo as Barry Gibb. Guests included liberal lawyer Elie Mystal (Kenan Thompson), politician Andrew Yang (Bowen Yang), and online political commentator "JoJoFromJerz" / Joanne Carducci (Dakota Johnson).

== See also ==
- Recurring Saturday Night Live characters and sketches
