= Nasim Pedrad =

American actress (born 1981)

- نسیم پدراد
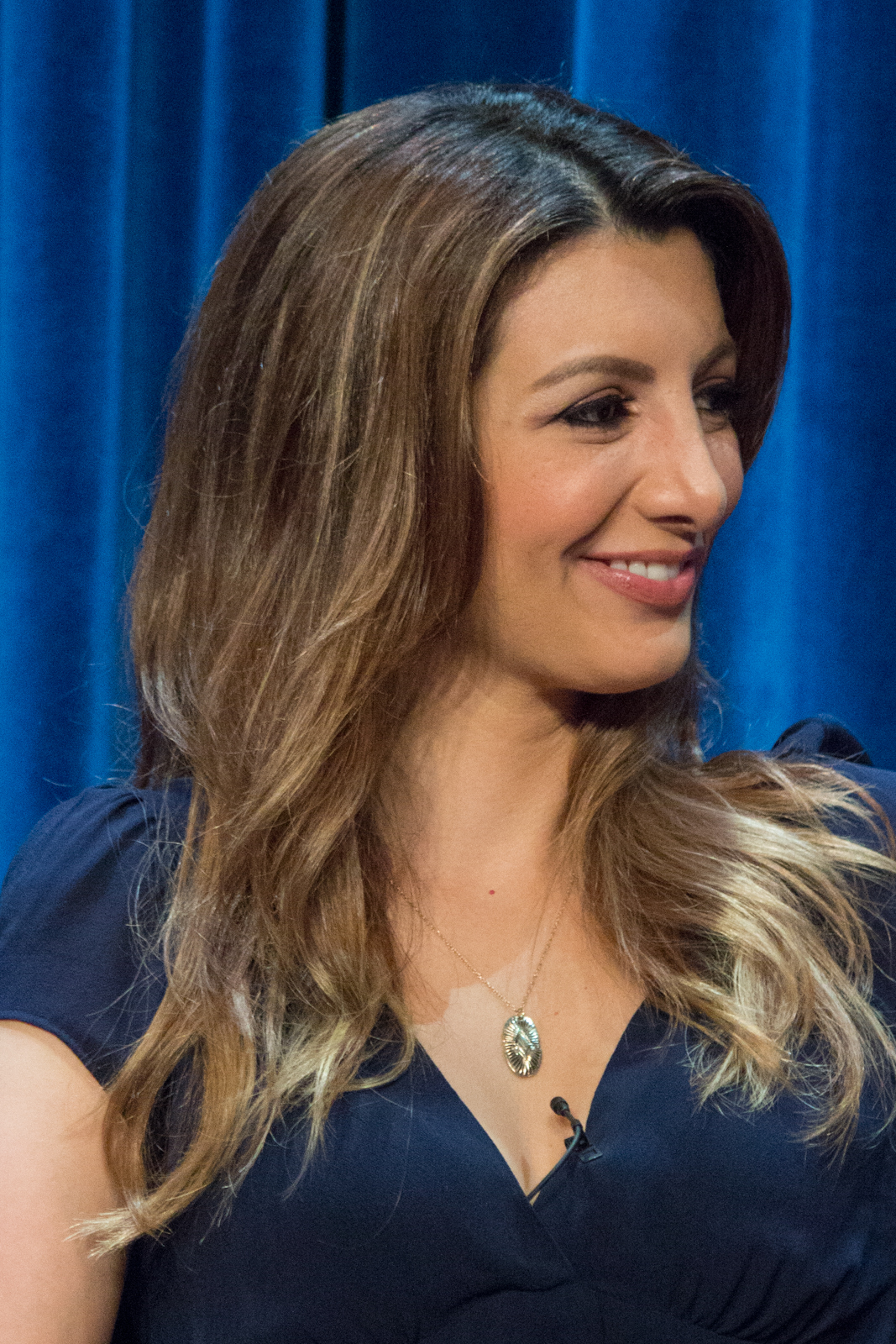
- Pedrad in 2014
- Born: 18 November 1981 (age 44); Tehran, Iran
- Education: University of California, Los Angeles (BFA)
- Occupations: Actress; comedian
- Years active: 2002–present

Nasim Pedrad (Persian: نسیم پدراد; born November 18, 1981) is an Iranian-born American actress and comedian. She was a cast member on the NBC sketch comedy and variety series Saturday Night Live from 2009 to 2014. She later went on to star in the Fox sitcoms Mulaney (2014–2015) and New Girl (2015–2018), the Fox horror comedy series Scream Queens (2015), and the TBS science fiction comedy series People of Earth (2017). Pedrad also created, produced, and starred in the TBS/The Roku Channel sitcom Chad (2021–2024).

In film, Pedrad has had voice roles in animated films including The Lorax (2012), and Despicable Me 2 (2013), and starring roles in the comedy films Cooties (2014) and Desperados (2020), as well as the fantasy film Aladdin (2019).

== Early life ==
Nasim Pedrad was born on 18 November 1981 in Tehran, Iran. Her family left Tehran soon after she was born; her father was able to immigrate to the United States immediately, but Pedrad and her mother were not, so they had to stay in Germany, reuniting with her father when she was three years old. Her younger sister, Nina, is a comedy writer.

Pedrad graduated from UCLA School of Theater, Film and Television in 2003. She was a member of the UCLA Spring Sing Company.

== Career ==
=== Early work ===
Pedrad was a performer with the Sunday Company at The Groundlings in Los Angeles. She frequently performed her one-woman show Me, Myself & Iran at the Los Angeles divisions of ImprovOlympic and the Upright Citizens Brigade Theatre. The show was selected for the 2007 HBO Comedy Festival in Las Vegas. She received an LA Weekly Best Comedic Performance of the Year Award as the lead in the comedic spoof After School Special.

In 2006, Pedrad made her first television appearance on an episode of Gilmore Girls as a waitress with two lines. In 2007, she made a guest appearance on The Winner. She had a recurring role on ER as Nurse Suri. In 2009, she had a guest appearance on It's Always Sunny in Philadelphia.

Pedrad joined the cast of Saturday Night Live in 2009 as part of the 35th (2009–2010) season. Pedrad became a repertory player in the 2011–12 season after two years of being a featured player. Pedrad left SNL in 2014 to work on Mulaney.

=== 2011–present ===
In 2011, Pedrad was a recurring voice on the Fox animated series Allen Gregory. She appeared in a small role in the 2011 film No Strings Attached. In 2012, she had a supporting voice role in the animated feature film The Lorax and a small appearance in The Dictator. In 2013, Pedrad had another supporting voice role, in Despicable Me 2. In the autumn of 2014, she left Saturday Night Live to star in a new Fox sitcom, Mulaney. On October 18, 2014, Fox shut down production of the series by reducing the 16-episode order by three episodes. Filming for the thirteenth episode had just been completed prior to the order reduction, and the fourteenth episode was about to enter production.

From 2015 to 2018, Pedrad had a recurring guest role as LAPD officer Aly Nelson on the Fox sitcom New Girl. She portrayed Gigi Caldwell in Season One of the Fox horror-comedy Scream Queens.

In 2016, Pedrad appeared in a commercial for Old Navy alongside comedian Kumail Nanjiani and other SNL cast members Cecily Strong and Jay Pharoah.

In 2017, Pedrad joined the cast of season 2 of the TBS comedy series People of Earth. Later that same year, she also made guest appearances on Curb Your Enthusiasm and Brooklyn Nine-Nine.

In 2020, Pedrad starred as Wesley in the Netflix film Desperados.

In 2021, Pedrad starred in the TBS TV series Chad which she also created, wrote, and directed.

== Filmography ==
=== Film ===
Year	Title	Role	Notes
2005	The 73 Virgins	Zahra	Short film
2008	A Thousand Words	The Photographer	Short film
2011	No Strings Attached	Writer	
2012	The Dictator	Female GMW Host	
2012	The Lorax	Isabella Once-ler (voice)	
2013	Despicable Me 2	Jillian (voice)	
2014	Cooties	Rebekkah Halverson	
2019	Corporate Animals	Suzy	
2019	Aladdin	Dalia	
2020	Desperados	Wesley Darya	
2023	Wish	Sania (voice)	
2024	Beverly Hills Cop: Axel F	Ashley	
2026	Jumanji: Open World		

=== Television ===
Year	Title	Role	Notes
2006	Gilmore Girls	Waitress	Episode: "Bridesmaids Revisited"
2007	The Winner	Waitress	Episode: "What Happens in Albany, Stays in Albany"
2007–2009	ER	Nurse Suri	9 episodes
2009	It's Always Sunny in Philadelphia	Lucy	Episode: "The Waitress Is Getting Married"
2009–2014, 2018	Saturday Night Live	Various characters	109 episodes
2011	Allen Gregory	Val / Brinique (voice)	7 episodes
2013	The Awesomes	Various voices	5 episodes
2014–2015	TripTank	Various voices	9 episodes
2014–2015	Mulaney	Jane Parvana	Starring role; 13 episodes
2015–2018	New Girl	Aly Nelson	Recurring role, 28 episodes
2015	Scream Queens	Gigi Caldwell	10 episodes
2016	The Mindy Project	Dr. Yasmin Maloof	Episode: "Nurses' Strike"
2017	People of Earth	Special Agent Alex Foster	10 episodes
2017	Big Mouth	Fatima (voice)	Episode: "Girls Are Horny Too"
2017	Curb Your Enthusiasm	Numa	Episode: "Foisted!"
2018	Brooklyn Nine-Nine	Kate Peralta	Episode: "DFW"
2018	No Activity	Belle	Episode: "Honesty & Action"
2021–2024	Chad	Chad	Also creator, writer, director, and executive producer
2021	Just Beyond	Miss Genevieve	Episode: "Leave Them Kids Alone"
2022–2023	Pretzel and the Puppies	Greta (voice)	17 episodes
2022	The Boys Presents: Diabolical	Cherry (voice)	Episode: "Boyd in 3D"
2022	Big Nate	Barbara (voice)	Episode: "Randy's Mom Has Got It Goin' On"
2023–2025	Star Wars: Young Jedi Adventures	Zia Zanna (voice)	16 episodes
2024	Angry Birds Mystery Island	Rosie (voice)	8 episodes
2024	High Potential	Nedda Donovan	1 episode

== See also ==
- List of Iranian actresses
