= Recurring Saturday Night Live characters and sketches introduced 2007–08 =

The following is a list of recurring Saturday Night Live characters and sketches introduced between September 29, 2007, and May 17, 2008, the thirty-third season of SNL.

== Nicholas Fehn ==
Claiming to be a political comedian, Nicholas Fehn (Fred Armisen) takes the top headlines from newspapers and offers his own "skewed view" of them. However, he never actually manages to say anything satirical or clever, often simply shouting "C'mon!" or "No!" and sometimes "Who asked?!" When confronted with his lack of humorous material, he will try to defend himself, but will get only about a dozen or so words into each thought when he will go off on a tangent, resulting in his argument going nowhere. On a live episode of WTF with Marc Maron, Armisen revealed that Fehn was partially inspired by Maron, David Cross, and himself.

Appearances

Season	Episode	Host	Notes
33	October 13, 2007	Jon Bon Jovi	
33	March 1, 2008	Elliot Page	
33	April 12, 2008	Ashton Kutcher	
34	September 13, 2008	Michael Phelps	
34	October 25, 2008	Jon Hamm	
35	November 7, 2009	Taylor Swift	
37	January 7, 2012	Charles Barkley	

== Jean K. Jean ==
Jean K. Jean, portrayed by Kenan Thompson, is a black comedian signed by Def Jam France, who speaks perfect American English, and whose act consists of Americanized urban quips and zings. The punchline of these zings incorporate French words or references. Once accomplishing the zing, he shouts "Zut Alors!", stands up, and grooves to a hip-hop beat, waits three seconds and gives the cut-off hand signal (swift hand movement across the neck). The music stops sharply on his cue, he sits back down, and shouts "Incroyable!" His attire consists of various outfits, but the only stereotypical French items appearing in all of his appearances is a beret and a scarf. Jean K. Jean is occasionally introduced as being from Paris but according to one segment he claims to be from Marseille.

Appearances

Season	Episode	Host	Notes
33	March 8, 2008	Amy Adams	
33	May 10, 2008	Shia LaBeouf	
34	October 18, 2008	Josh Brolin	
34	April 4, 2009	Seth Rogen	
35	September 26, 2009	Megan Fox	
35	February 6, 2010	Ashton Kutcher	
36	April 9, 2011	Helen Mirren	
38	October 13, 2012	Christina Applegate	
38	May 18, 2013	Ben Affleck	Appears with other characters in the background of Stefon sketch.
51	March 14, 2026	Harry Styles	Appears outside of Weekend Update, in the sketch "Sparkle of the Sea".

== The Suze Orman Show ==
A parody of the financial advice program The Suze Orman Show, starring Kristen Wiig as Suze Orman.

Appearances

Season	Episode	Host	Notes
33	March 15, 2008	Jonah Hill	
33	May 10, 2008	Shia LaBeouf	
34	October 18, 2008	Josh Brolin	
35	April 24, 2010	Gabourey Sidibe	
36	October 9, 2010	Jane Lynch	

Wiig also appeared as Orman on the October 1, 2009, episode of Weekend Update Thursday.

== Adam Grossman ==
Jonah Hill plays a precocious six-year-old comedian who performs Borscht Belt humor while visiting a hibachi restaurant with his divorced father, Evan (Bill Hader).

Appearances

Season	Episode	Host	Notes
33	March 15, 2008	Jonah Hill	Adam and his recently divorced father have a lively dinner at Benihana.
37	March 10, 2012	Jonah Hill	Adam joins his father on a date with a woman (Vanessa Bayer) he met on J-Date at Benihana.
39	January 25, 2014	Jonah Hill	Adam and his new stepmother Debbie (Vanessa Bayer) dine at Benihana.
44	November 3, 2018	Jonah Hill	Adam and his nanny (Leslie Jones) eat at Benihana and talk to a couple (Mikey Day and Kenan Thompson).

== Clancy and Jackie ==
Clancy T. Bachleratt (Will Forte) and Jackie Snad (Kristen Wiig) sing tunes from their album of songs about spaceships, toddlers, Model T cars, and jars of beer.

Appearances

Season	Episode	Host	Notes
33	March 15, 2008	Jonah Hill	Hill appears as Tim Jacklepappy.
34	April 4, 2009	Seth Rogen	Rogen appears as Kirby Spabblespoov.
47	January 22, 2022	Will Forte	Kenan Thompson appears as Jevner Keeblerelv.

== Sue ==
Kristen Wiig plays Sue, who loves surprises but has trouble keeping them secret.

Appearances

Season	Episode	Host	Notes
33	April 5, 2008	Christopher Walken	Grandpa (Walken) is surprising his granddaughter with a birthday party.
34	October 18, 2008	Josh Brolin	At a Japanese restaurant, Chris (Brolin) tells his friends he'll be proposing to his girlfriend.
35	December 12, 2009	Taylor Lautner	Alex (Lautner) and Ashley (Abby Elliott) tell Aunt Sue they want to surprise Ashley's parents about her pregnancy.
37	December 3, 2011	Steve Buscemi	A manager (Buscemi) tells his employees he wants to surprise their co-worker with a promotion.
42	November 19, 2016	Kristen Wiig	A woman (Cecily Strong) plans to surprise her mother (Vanessa Bayer) with the return of her brother Paul (Pete Davidson) from the military.
46	December 19, 2020	Kristen Wiig	A family plans to surprise their grandpa (Alex Moffat) about (Lauren Holt)'s homecoming.

== Family Reunion ==
A celebrity (the host playing himself) attends an extended-family reunion where everyone is a caricature of his personality and/or characters over the years.

Appearances

Season	Episode	Host	Notes
33	April 5, 2008	Christopher Walken	Walken Family Reunion
40	October 25, 2014	Jim Carrey	Carrey Family Reunion
44	May 4, 2019	Adam Sandler	Sandler Family Reunion

A "Franco Family Reunion" was mentioned during the December 9, 2017 episode hosted by James Franco.

== The Cougar Den ==
Deidre Nicks (Amy Poehler), Toni Ward (Casey Wilson), and Jacqueline Seka (Kristen Wiig) host a talk show for "cougars", older women who date younger men. Other characters in this sketch include Kenneth (Kenan Thompson) the stage director and Kiki Deamore (Cameron Diaz), the show's most frequent guest.

Appearances

Season	Episode	Host	Notes
33	April 12, 2008	Ashton Kutcher	Kutcher plays Kiki's new "boy biscuit", tennis coach Jaden.
34	September 20, 2008	James Franco	Franco plays Kiki's new boyfriend, emo musician Madison.
34	February 14, 2009	Alec Baldwin	New host Barbara Lincoln (Michaela Watkins) replaces Deidre. Baldwin plays male cougar Blaine Bagby.

This sketch also appeared in the dress rehearsal for the November 14, 2009, episode hosted by January Jones, but was cut for the live episode.

== Judy Grimes ==
Judy Grimes is Weekend Update's Travel Expert, played by Kristen Wiig. Grimes suffers from extreme stage fright, causing her to appear visibly nervous and talk in long, fast-paced sentences; she often uses the phrase "just kidding" to punctuate her run-on sentences. In her first appearance she talked in small portions and laughed nervously throughout them, but now it has shifted into very long parts.

Appearances

Season	Episode	Host	Notes
33	April 12, 2008	Ashton Kutcher	
34	September 27, 2008	Anna Faris	
34	January 17, 2009	Rosario Dawson	
35	September 26, 2009	Megan Fox	
35	April 24, 2010	Gabourey Sidibe	
37	November 5, 2011	Charlie Day	

== Scared Straight ==
As part of the Scared Straight juvenile diversion program, Captain Sikorsky, a frustrated police officer played by Jason Sudeikis, Sikorsky invites two imprisoned convicts, Lorenzo MacIntosh (Kenan Thompson) and another played by the episode's host, to warn three juvenile delinquents (Bill Hader, Bobby Moynihan and Andy Samberg) about the dangers of a criminal lifestyle and conditions in prison, like frequent violence, sexual abuse, and substance use.

However, each story the convicts share about their crimes or incarceration is easily recognized by the youths as the plot from a classic American movie. As they identify each movie, the convicts turn the film into a reference to prison rape. In one example, MacIntosh warns that, following the delinquents mentioning The Wizard of Oz, "It won't be a lion, a tin man and a scarecrow. It'll be you, lyin’ down, while ten men make you a scared ho!"

In another example, after the youths make the connection to Groundhog Day, Tracy Morgan’s character Kendrick MacEntire and MacIntosh warn the young offenders that, in prison, a groundhog “won’t pop out of the ground”, but, rather, “It’ll pop out of a hole in yo’ cellmate’s pants!” They additionally warn that, even if their cellmate’s “groundhog” doesn’t cast a shadow, it won’t be springtime; it’ll be “ding-a-ling” time.

In every sketch, after the second or third innuendo of a movie reference, Sikorsky is always forced to rein in either MacIntosh or the other convict. MacIntosh typically responds in a halfhearted apology and playfully downplays his transgression.

Appearances

Season	Episode	Host	Notes
33	May 10, 2008	Shia LaBeouf	LaBeouf appears as one of the teenagers (with Hader and Samberg); Lorenzo MacIntosh (Thompson) is the only convict. Gone in 60 Seconds, The Goonies, Weekend at Bernie's.
34	November 15, 2008	Paul Rudd	Rudd appears as one of the teenagers (with Hader and Samberg); Lorenzo MacIntosh (Thompson) is the only convict. Misery, Teen Wolf, Bill & Ted's Excellent Adventure.
34	March 14, 2009	Tracy Morgan	Morgan plays fellow convict Kendrick MacEntire. Sideways, Groundhog Day, E.T. the Extra-Terrestrial .
35	November 7, 2009	Taylor Swift	Swift plays "Skeet Devlin", a male fellow convict. Top Gun, The Sound of Music, Back to the Future.
35	January 9, 2010	Charles Barkley	Barkley plays Lorenzo MacIntosh's father, Marvin. Aladdin, The Matrix, Jerry Maguire.
35	May 8, 2010	Betty White	White plays Lorenzo MacIntosh's grandmother and fellow convict, Loretta MacIntosh. Willy Wonka & the Chocolate Factory, The Wizard of Oz.
36	March 12, 2011	Zach Galifianakis	Galifianakis plays a dangerously psychotic convict, Larry Bernstein, who is forced to wear a strait jacket and be tied to a board to speak to the young punks. Home Alone, The King's Speech, The Hangover.
37	March 4, 2012	Lindsay Lohan	Lindsay Lohan plays herself—a proud convict. Pee-wee's Big Adventure, Forrest Gump, Herbie: Fully Loaded, Freaky Friday, The Parent Trap, Mean Girls.
50	February 16, 2025	50th Anniversary Special	Eddie Murphy plays "All the Way" Ray May and Will Ferrell plays "Big Red." Marcello Hernandez, Mikey Day, and Michael Longfellow play the teens. Harry Potter and the Sorcerer's Stone, The Nutty Professor, Elf.

This sketch was included in the dress rehearsal for the October 8, 2011, episode (hosted by Ben Stiller), but was cut for the final broadcast.

Preceded by Recurring Saturday Night Live characters and sketches introduced 2006–07	Recurring Saturday Night Live characters and sketches (listed chronologically)	Succeeded by Recurring Saturday Night Live characters and sketches introduced 2008–09
