= Recurring Saturday Night Live characters and sketches introduced 2006–07 =

List of characters and sketches introduced in the 32nd season of Saturday Night Live

The following is a list of recurring Saturday Night Live characters and sketches introduced between September 30, 2006, and May 19, 2007, the thirty-second season of SNL.

== Jon Bovi ==
Jon Bovi is a Bon Jovi opposite band played by Will Forte and Jason Sudeikis. All of their songs consist of popular hits, usually but not always by Bon Jovi, with the lyrics reversed; for example, "Your love is like bad medicine/Bad medicine is what I need," becomes, "Your hate is like good medicine/Good medicine is not what I need."

After debuting in a 2006 sketch with Jaime Pressly, all subsequent Jon Bovi appearances were on Weekend Update.

Appearances

Season	Episode	Host	Notes
32	October 7, 2006	Jaime Pressly	Jon Bovi audition in the office of record executive Jackie Downs (Pressly), performing take-offs of Bon Jovi's "Wanted: Dead or Alive" ("Unwanted: Alive or Dead") and "Bad Medicine" ("Good Medicine"), Usher's "Yeah" ("No"), and Mötley Crüe's "Girls, Girls, Girls" ("Boys, Boys, Boys"). She signs them to a 50-year recording contract. Over the cover of their album Jon Bovi Does Not Sing The Hits Of Scorpions, we hear Jon Bovi's version of Scorpions' "Rock You Like a Hurricane" ("Roll Me Like a Pleasant Day").
34	March 7, 2009	Dwayne Johnson	Songs parodied: Wanted Dead or Alive; Livin' on a Prayer; Legs and Sharp Dressed Man by ZZ Top; Open Arms by Journey; Baby Got Back by Sir Mix-A-Lot
34	April 11, 2009	Zac Efron	Songs parodied: Bad Medicine; Bridge over Troubled Water by Simon & Garfunkel; That's What Friends Are For by Rod Stewart; Eye of the Tiger by Survivor; Bette Davis Eyes by Kim Carnes
35	November 14, 2009	January Jones	Songs parodied: Bad Medicine; Blaze of Glory; Ebony and Ivory by Paul McCartney and Stevie Wonder; Single Ladies by Beyoncé; Who Let the Dogs Out by Baha Men

A Christmas-themed sketch that was cut from a dress rehearsal was reenacted on the Late Night with Seth Meyers segment "Second-Chance Theater" on February 13, 2019. The following songs were parodied:

- Livin' on a Prayer
- You Give Love a Bad Name
- Alone by Heart
- Up Where We Belong by Jennifer Warnes and Joe Cocker
- Jessie's Girl by Rick Springfield

== Two Gay Guys ==
Portrayed by Fred Armisen and Bill Hader, the "Two Gay Guys from New Jersey" appear on Weekend Update to comment about current events. They embody many stereotypes of New Jersey residents, similar to the characters of The Sopranos (including dropping hints about Mafia connections and activities). They wear matching track suits and gold medallions. The couple interact with each other like good friends, while sprinkling their conversations with reminders that they are in a homosexual relationship.

Appearances

Season	Episode	Host	Notes
32	October 28, 2006	Hugh Laurie	As "a same-sex couple from Jersey", the guys comment on the New Jersey Supreme Court ruling that gay couples deserve the same rights as married couples.
32	December 16, 2006	Justin Timberlake	The guys comment on the New Jersey legislature's vote to recognize civil unions for same-sex couples.
32	April 14, 2007	Shia LaBeouf	Two Gay Guys from Connecticut
34	April 11, 2009	Zac Efron	The guys discuss their recent marriage.
35	October 17, 2009	Gerard Butler	As "two gay guys from New Jersey who are in the military," the guys comment on the Don't Ask, Don't Tell policy, which President Obama had recently announced he would end.
38	November 10, 2012	Anne Hathaway	Two Gay Guys from Maine

== Blizzard Man ==
Andy Samberg plays a terrible, yet acclaimed, white rapper. Each sketch takes place in a recording studio where Blizzard Man is asked to come in and work with a major rap star.

Appearances

Season	Episode	Host	Notes
32	November 18, 2006	Ludacris	Ludacris (as himself) convinces his producers (Jason Sudeikis and Maya Rudolph) to let him feature Blizzard Man on his new recording.
32	January 20, 2007	Jeremy Piven	A music producer (Piven) convinces Common (as himself) to work with Blizzard Man.
33	November 22, 2008	Tim McGraw	Ludacris (as himself) replaces collaborator T-Pain with Blizzard Man; McGraw plays Blizzard Man's manager.
35	December 4, 2010	Robert De Niro	Sean Combs (as himself) brings Blizzard Man into the studio; they are joined by Blizzard Man's mother (De Niro).
39	May 17, 2014	Andy Samberg	Blizzard Man collaborates with guest star 2 Chainz (as himself)

== Aunt Linda ==
Portrayed by Kristen Wiig, Aunt Linda is Amy Poehler's (fictitious) aunt, who appears on Weekend Update to give almost entirely negative reviews of recent films. But instead of allocating the films a star rating or thumbs up, she reviews each film with her own catchphrases, such as "Whaaat?" or "Oh, brother!" For example, when reviewing Ocean's Thirteen, she gives it "13 Ghaas!" and a "Puhhhleez!"

Her reason for disliking the film is often due to her own misunderstandings, such as when she thought Happy Feet was supposed to be a live action film, or when she thought Ocean's Thirteen was going to be the thirteenth film in the series.

She sometimes ends her appearances by praising a film that you wouldn't expect her to like, such as when she praised Saw III and was asked by a half-stunned Amy Poehler "you went to see Saw?" Aunt Linda responded, "See it! I liked it so much I kidnapped Tobin Bell and forced him to play a game with me!"

Wiig writes Aunt Linda's appearances with Paula Pell. The character originated when Wiig was performing with the Groundlings, as she described in an interview:

It was a woman who was on the plane who was watching the in-flight movie, which was The Matrix, and she was so confused by it. She didn’t understand anything and she just kept talking to the people, like, "What is going on?" I tried it as a sketch at SNL five times. It went to dress maybe three times, and finally someone was like, "Why don’t you try her at Update?" so that's how she eventually got on the show.

Appearances

Season	Episode	Host	Notes
32	November 11, 2006	Alec Baldwin	Aunt Linda is not impressed with Babel, Happy Feet, or Flushed Away, but loved Saw III for its pacing, performances, and soundtrack.
32	December 2, 2006	Matthew Fox	Aunt Linda criticizes Borat, Casino Royale, and "Apaclypto" (Apocalypto), finding all disappointing, but ends the segment deciding to see the Rockefeller Center Christmas Tree.
32	February 24, 2007	Rainn Wilson	Aunt Linda pans Oscar-nominated films The Queen, The Pursuit of Happyness and Letters from Iwo Jima, but liked The Fast and the Furious: Tokyo Drift.
32	May 19, 2007	Zach Braff	Aunt Linda doesn't like Pirates of the Caribbean: Dead Man's Chest, Ocean's Thirteen, or Rush Hour 3.
34	November 1, 2008	Ben Affleck	Aunt Linda doesn't like new TV series Life on Mars and Knight Rider, but praises Californication's "great storylines, realistic acting, and genitals."
35	April 10, 2010	Tina Fey	Aunt Linda disapproves of Clash of the Titans, Alice in Wonderland, Tooth Fairy, and Avatar.
49	April 6, 2024	Kristen Wiig	Aunt Linda despises Barbie, Oppenheimer and The Bear, but loves PAW Patrol: The Mighty Movie.

Wiig, in her episode of Inside the Actors Studio, revived the Aunt Linda character in a review of Citizen Kane, which she criticized for its length, lack of color, and twist ending. When asked to name a film she liked, Aunt Linda replied: "Jumanji."

== Bronx Beat ==
Blunt, disgusted Bronx housewives Betty Caruso (Amy Poehler) and Jodi Deitz (Maya Rudolph) host a talk show. In most of this sketch's iterations, the ladies fawn over an attractive male guest.

Season	Episode	Host	Notes
32	January 13, 2007	Jake Gyllenhaal	Gyllenhaal plays Frank O’Connor, the author of a mountain biking guide.
32	February 10, 2007	Forest Whitaker	Whitaker and Kristen Wiig play Joseph Humphries and Cora Reynolds, two doctors promoting a blood drive; Betty and Jodi insist the doctors are in love with each other.
32	March 24, 2007	Peyton Manning	Manning plays Joseph Ryan, a zookeeper.
32	May 19, 2007	Zach Braff	Braff plays Mike Drucker, an intern.
33	November 3, 2007	Brian Williams	Williams plays Paul Dooley, a firefighter.
34	December 13, 2008	Hugh Laurie	Laurie plays Jeffrey Billings, a butcher who opened a new shop. Betty and Jodi are fascinated by his English accent and insist he say words like "schedule" and "vitamin."
36	September 25, 2010	Amy Poehler	Musical guest Katy Perry plays Maureen DiCicco, a provocatively dressed library volunteer (in reference to recent real-life criticism of Perry for appearing on Sesame Street in a low-cut dress).
37	February 18, 2012	Maya Rudolph	There are no guests in the studio, so the show's crew members Lou and Tony (Andy Samberg and Justin Timberlake, in a cameo) sit down with Betty and Jodi.
41	December 19, 2015	Tina Fey & Amy Poehler	Fey plays Betty's cousin Karen from Philadelphia.
50	February 16, 2025	50th Anniversary Special	Miles Teller plays himself and Mike Myers reprises his role as Linda Richman.

One sketch appeared in the dress rehearsal for the May 8, 2010, episode (hosted by Betty White), but was cut for the live episode.

== MacGruber ==
Will Forte plays a special operations agent in a parody of MacGyver. The character starred in its own film in 2010.

Appearances

Season	Episode	Host	Notes
32	January 20, 2007	Jeremy Piven	MacGruber asks his assistants for disgusting things like dog feces, which they refuse to help with.
32	May 12, 2007	Molly Shannon	
33	October 6, 2007	Seth Rogen	
33	March 15, 2008	Jonah Hill	
33	May 10, 2008	Shia LaBeouf	
34	October 18, 2008	Josh Brolin	
34	March 7, 2009	Dwayne Johnson	MacGyver (cameo by Richard Dean Anderson) is revealed to be MacGruber's father. Five weeks earlier, MacGruber and MacGyver had appeared together in a series of Super Bowl commercials (promoting Pepsi) that resembled MacGruber sketches.
35	January 10, 2010	Charles Barkley	
35	May 8, 2010	Betty White	
47	January 22, 2022	Will Forte	Ryan Phillippe appears as his character Piper from the MacGruber film and TV series.

== Really?!? ==
A Weekend Update Segment

Season	Episode	Host	With	Topic
32	January 20, 2007	Jeremy Piven	Seth and Amy	Michael Vick
32	April 21, 2007	Scarlett Johansson	Seth and Amy	Alberto Gonzales
33	October 6, 2007	Seth Rogen	Seth and Amy	Larry Craig
33	March 15, 2008	Jonah Hill	Seth and Amy	Eliot Spitzer
34	December 13, 2008	Hugh Laurie	Seth and Amy	Rod Blagojevich
34	February 7, 2009	Bradley Cooper	Seth	Kellogg's
34	March 14, 2009	Tracy Morgan	Tracy	Strip Clubs
34	May 16, 2009	Will Ferrell	Seth and Amy	Arizona State
35	November 7, 2009	Taylor Swift	Seth and Amy	Goldman Sachs
35	March 13, 2010	Jude Law	Seth and Jerry	Eric Massa
35	May 8, 2010	Betty White	Seth, Amy, and Tina	Times Square, Greece's Debt
36	September 25, 2010	Amy Poehler	Seth and Amy	Mahmoud Ahmadinejad
36	May 21, 2011	Justin Timberlake	Seth	Arnold Schwarzenegger
37	November 19, 2011	Jason Segel	Seth and Kermit	Congress Nutrition
37	February 18, 2012	Maya Rudolph	Seth and Amy	Birth Control Hearing
37	May 12, 2012	Will Ferrell	Seth	Time Magazine
38	March 2, 2013	Kevin Hart	Seth and Kevin	Voting Rights Act
38	May 18, 2013	Ben Affleck	Seth and Amy	Tea Party Tax
44	October 13, 2018	Seth Meyers	Seth, Colin, and Michael	Trump and Kanye

== Danny Hoover ==
Danny Hoover, portrayed by Andy Samberg, is a sick child who joins the broadcast hosts of a live sporting event as a guest through an organization such as the Make-A-Wish Foundation. His first play-by-play comment is apt and gets praise from the hosts. He then continues to make that same comment after each successive play, despite it no longer making sense. The hosts get increasingly agitated at his absurd commentary and in their annoyance eventually call into question the severity of his medical condition.

Appearances

Season	Episode	Host	Notes
32	January 20, 2007	Jeremy Piven	Danny joins an NFL on CBS broadcast with Jim Nantz (Piven) and Phil Simms (Jason Sudeikis).
35	January 9, 2010	Charles Barkley	Danny joins an Inside the NBA broadcast with Charles Barkley (himself) and Kevin Harlan (Jason Sudeikis).

== The Dakota Fanning Show ==
Precocious child actress Dakota Fanning (Amy Poehler) hosts her own talk show, which she describes as "the only forum for child actors to discuss cinema, theater, politics, philosophy, and the cultural zeitgeist at large." The highly intellectual Dakota has trouble relating to her guests; for example, while talking to Dylan and Cole Sprouse about their sitcom The Suite Life of Zack & Cody, Dakota says the word "hotel" "invokes images of [the film] Hotel Rwanda, about the Rwandan genocide", prompting Dylan Sprouse to say, "Dakota, you're scaring us." Her references are frequently lost on the show's cheerful bandleader, Reggie Hudson (Kenan Thompson), leading her to make condescending remarks such as "If it isn't in the check-out line at Wal-Mart, Reggie hasn't read it." Dakota herself often professes to be "not familiar" with popular entertainment such as Family Guy, ESPN, or Harry Potter. Kristen Wiig appears as Dakota's mother, whom she addresses as Catherine, despite her mother's requests to call her Mom.

Poehler also played Dakota Fanning in a sketch on the September 29, 2007, episode, where she presented a Kid's Choice Award (while commenting, "It's so weird that they asked me, Dakota Fanning, to present the award for Best TV Show, because I don't even own a TV!").

Season	Episode	Host	Notes
32	February 3, 2007	Drew Barrymore	Barrymore appears as Abigail Breslin; Bill Hader appears as Daniel Radcliffe.
32	April 14, 2007	Shia LaBeouf	LaBeouf and Andy Samberg appear as Cole and Dylan Sprouse; musical guest Avril Lavigne appears as Dakota's sister Elle Fanning.
33	March 1, 2008	Elliot Page	Page appears as Miley Cyrus. Dakota introduces a new segment, "Kids Speak," where she goes out to ask kids on the street their opinions on issues such as "Did Stalin bring down the Soviet Union? Or was it an experiment doomed to fail?" and "Bonjour tristesse: masterpiece or overrated?"

== Song Memories ==
Four buddies (Jason Sudeikis, Bill Hader, Will Forte and the host) hear a favorite old song playing and sing along to the chorus together, while sharing disturbing memories during the verses. Most sketches end with the group performing a non-sequitur activity (e.g. staging a robbery, accidental gun discharge, Tea Party protest) and a stylized "The End". The final sketch ends with guests Mumford & Sons leading the cast into the audience for a sing-along. Andy Samberg replaced Forte in the "Wild World" sketch featuring Ed Helms and Kenan Thompson replaced him in the "You've Got To Hide Your Love Away" sketch featuring Joseph Gordon-Levitt.

Appearances

Season	Episode	Host	Notes
32	February 24, 2007	Rainn Wilson	"Danny's Song" by Kenny Loggins
32	May 19, 2007	Zach Braff	"The Weight" by The Band
33	April 12, 2008	Ashton Kutcher	"Amie" by The Pure Prairie League
34	November 15, 2008	Paul Rudd	"Garden Party" by Rick Nelson
34	February 7, 2009	Bradley Cooper	"To Be with You" by Mr. Big
35	April 17, 2010	Ryan Phillippe	"Breakfast at Tiffany's" by Deep Blue Something
36	May 14, 2011	Ed Helms	"Wild World" by Cat Stevens
38	September 22, 2012	Joseph Gordon-Levitt	"You've Got to Hide Your Love Away" by The Beatles, performed by musical guest Mumford & Sons

== La Rivista Della Televisione ==
Bill Hader plays Vinny Vedecci, the rude, sexist host of an Italian talk show; that week's SNL guest plays themselves as a guest on the show. Vedecci welcomes the guest and begins speaking to them in rapid Italian, prompting the guest to admit they don't speak Italian. Vedecci speaks angrily (in Italian) to his director (Fred Armisen), who is seen at a table offstage eating spaghetti with his silent assistant (Will Forte and later Paul Brittain). Vedecci then proceeds to ask the guest weird questions in slightly broken English. He sometimes leads the conversation to another celebrity (who may or may not have anything to do with the guest), and proceeds to interrupt the interview with a brief, perfect imitation of that celebrity. Often, Vedecci's young son (Bobby Moynihan) will run on-stage to ask the guest a question that, while in English, is mumbled to hell and back; the guest's flummoxed response leads the boy to begin wailing until his father pacifies him with a cigarette or other adult vice.

Appearances

Season	Episode	Host	Notes
32	March 17, 2007	Julia Louis-Dreyfus	
32	May 19, 2007	Zach Braff	Vedecci brings up Peter Falk (for no apparent reason) and does an imitation of Falk as Columbo. He shows a clip of Scrubs dubbed in Italian and turned into a drama. Two puppets appear, and Vedecci encourages Braff to kiss one; when he does, the puppet vomits in Braff's face.
33	October 13, 2007	Jon Bon Jovi	Bon Jovi's home state of New Jersey lead Vedecci and the director to imitate Silvio Dante and Paulie Walnuts from The Sopranos. Vedecci shows a clip from a children's cigarette commercial featuring Bon Jovi's song "Blaze of Glory". Bon Jovi mentions that his grandmother spoke Italian, but none of the words Vedecci has used sound familiar.
33	May 10, 2008	Shia LaBeouf	Vedecci discusses LaBeouf's films—confusing Transformers with transsexuals—and shows a clip from Temple of Doom in which Vedecci has dubbed Italian. He then prompts LaBeouf to say Harrison Ford’s iconic line from Raiders of the Lost Ark: “I hate snakes!” Snakes are supposed to drop from the ceiling, but do not fall until later, during a question about the film Disturbia.
34	December 6, 2008	John Malkovich	Vedecci refers to the film Being John Malkovich and shows a clip of his own, extremely pornographic film, Being Vinny Vedecci.
34	April 4, 2009	Seth Rogen	Vedecci comments that Rogen is "very strange-looking," and in Italy is known as the "Bear Man." His Italian films are called "Attack of the Bear Man" (Knocked Up), "Police Bear Man" (Observe and Report), "Bearman and Miri Make a Porno" (Zack and Miri Make a Porno), and "Bearman and a Really, Really Handsome Man" (referencing Rogen and Hader's roles in Superbad). Vedecci does an impression of Rogen and then attempts to capture him using a bottle of S.Pellegrino in a bear trap.
35	October 10, 2009	Drew Barrymore	Vedecci refers to David Letterman's recent infidelity scandal, then takes a moment to apologize to the 87 female staffers he's slept with. Barrymore discusses her new film, Whip It, leading Vedecci to harass her into singing the Devo song with him and the director.
36	December 4, 2010	Robert De Niro	De Niro and the director perform De Niro impressions and Vedecci says the director's was better. Vedecci's son wants to act out a scene from a De Niro film, but is too drunk. Vedecci introduces the deer from The Deer Hunter, who he says wants revenge, and De Niro kills the deer only to discover it was a man in costume. Vedecci then tricks De Niro into doing lines from Taxi Driver.

This sketch also appeared in the dress rehearsal for the April 21, 2007, episode, hosted by Scarlett Johansson, but was cut for the live broadcast.

== Penelope ==
Each installment of this sketch takes place at a party or gathering of some sort. Kristen Wiig plays Penelope, a guest at the party who speaks in a shaking, nervous voice, compulsively twirls her curly brown hair around her fingers and is obsessed with one-upping or even two-upping any anecdote that any other guest at the party tells about themselves.

In each sketch, one party guest, usually the episode's host, becomes fed up with Penelope's one-upmanship and begins a tit-for-tat one-upmanship battle with Penelope which becomes increasingly absurd, in the style very reminiscent of the classic Four Yorkshiremen sketch. The first installment of the sketch simply ended with the character played by episode host, Peyton Manning, angrily storming off, leaving Penelope alone, muttering to herself. However, in most subsequent installments, after her one-upmanship rival stormed off in disgust, Penelope would do one of the absurd things she had claimed to be able to do in the one-upmanship battle (such as turning invisible, becoming black and white, or shrinking herself so small that she could use a stalk of celery as a raft), causing the viewer to wonder if, in fact, all of her statements were true.

Appearances

Season	Episode	Host	Notes
32	March 24, 2007	Peyton Manning	Housewarming party
32	May 12, 2007	Molly Shannon	Apartment building tenant's meeting. At the end, Penelope turns herself invisible.
33	September 29, 2007	LeBron James	James, as himself, fed up with Penelope's one-upmanship, challenges her to a one-on-one basketball match, which she wins.
33	March 8, 2008	Amy Adams	Traffic school. At the end, Penelope shrinks herself to be two inches tall.
34	January 10, 2009	Neil Patrick Harris	At the end, Penelope's best friend is revealed to be Liza Minnelli and a tomato (in a cameo).
35	November 7, 2009	Taylor Swift	Wedding reception. At the end, Penelope turns into a "black and white movie star from the thirties."
36	November 20, 2010	Anne Hathaway	Thanksgiving charity meal event. At the end, Penelope shrinks to miniature size and relaxes on a piece of celery in a pot of soup.

Preceded by Recurring Saturday Night Live characters and sketches introduced 2005–06	Recurring Saturday Night Live characters and sketches (listed chronologically)	Succeeded by Recurring Saturday Night Live characters and sketches introduced 2007–08
