= Recurring Saturday Night Live characters and sketches introduced 2005–06 =

The following is a list of recurring Saturday Night Live characters and sketches introduced between October 1, 2005, and May 20, 2006, the thirty-first season of SNL.

== Voice Recording Woman ==
Rachel Dratch plays Julie, a woman who provides the voice for automated speech recognition systems used by "companies such as United Airlines, Blue Cross and Amtrak." She interacts with other people in the same fashion as the automated system; for example, after she prompts her date to "please say your age" and he responds that he's 29, she says, "I think you said 19. Did I get that right?"

Appearances

Season	Episode	Host	Notes
31	October 8, 2005	Jon Heder	Julie meets Gary (Heder) on a blind date. At the end, she "mishears" his invitation to go to a movie: "Let me see if I have this correct: I think you said you wanted to go... back to my place. Did I get that right?" Gary's happy to go along with it.
31	April 8, 2006	Antonio Banderas	Julie meets Alberto (Banderas) at a party. While they are talking, Alberto struggles with his English, prompting Julie to ask if he'd like to continue the conversation in Spanish with her counterpart, Juan (Fred Armisen).

== Deep House Dish ==
DJ Dynasty Handbag (Kenan Thompson) and co-host Tiara Zee (Rachel Dratch), replaced in December 2006 by T'Shane (Andy Samberg), host a showcase for house music acts. Both Tiara and T'Shane appear to have mental difficulties, perhaps from heavy drug use, and are berated constantly by DJ Dynasty Handbag.

Each sketch features that week's SNL host, along with various cast members, as musical performers.

Appearances

Season	Episode	Host	Notes
31	November 19, 2005	Eva Longoria	Longoria plays Ms. Drama Martinez. Amy Poehler plays Tres Latraj. Bill Hader and Fred Armisen play DJ Frontal Assault and DJ Dimitrios.
31	January 14, 2006	Scarlett Johansson	Johansson plays Mrs. Donna Smalls English. Poehler plays Kayleesha Kang. Chris Parnell plays DJ Intro.
31	April 15, 2006	Lindsay Lohan	Hader and Armisen play DJ Frontal Assault and DJ Dimitrios.
32	December 2, 2006	Matthew Fox	The first appearance of new co-host T'Shane (Samberg).
32	January 13, 2007	Jake Gyllenhaal	
32	March 17, 2007	Julia Louis-Dreyfus	
32	May 19, 2007	Zach Braff	
34	September 27, 2008	Anna Faris	
35	October 3, 2009	Ryan Reynolds	Reynolds plays Danny McCooz. Musical guest Lady Gaga appears as herself with Madonna, and the two women get into a catfight. Kristen Wiig plays Miss Ice Tia.

== Vincent Price's Holiday Special ==
Bill Hader plays a caricature of horror actor Vincent Price, hosting a cheesy (and invariably botched) holiday special.

Appearances

Season	Episode	Host	Holiday and Year	Notes
31	November 19, 2005	Eva Longoria	Thanksgiving (1958)	Longoria plays Lucille Ball. Darrell Hammond plays Clark Gable. Kristen Wiig plays Judy Garland. Horatio Sanz plays Alfred Hitchcock. Fred Armisen plays Desi Arnez (as Ricky Ricardo). Amy Poehler plays a Chesterfield girl in a commercial.
31	March 11, 2006	Matt Dillon	St. Patrick's Day (1961)	Dillon plays Rod Serling. Wiig plays Katharine Hepburn. Hammond plays Don Knotts (as Barney Fife).
34	October 25, 2008	Jon Hamm	Halloween (1959)	Hamm plays James Mason. Wiig plays Gloria Swanson. Armisen plays Liberace.
34	February 14, 2009	Alec Baldwin	Valentine's Day (1966)	Baldwin plays Richard Burton. Wiig plays Carol Channing. Casey Wilson plays Elizabeth Taylor. Armisen plays Liberace.
35	December 19, 2009	James Franco	Christmas (1954)	Franco plays James Dean. Wiig plays Katharine Hepburn. Armisen plays Liberace. Abby Elliott plays Marilyn Monroe in a commercial for asbestos.
36	October 30, 2010	Jon Hamm	Halloween (1960)	Hamm plays John F. Kennedy. Wiig plays Judy Garland. Armisen plays Liberace. Nasim Pedrad plays Kennedy's campaign manager Candy DiCenzo.

The dress rehearsal for the May 20, 2006, episode, hosted by Kevin Spacey, included a Memorial Day version of this sketch that featured Spacey as Jack Lemmon, Wiig as Carol Channing, and Sanz as Alfred Hitchcock in a commercial for Psycho, but the sketch was cut for the live episode. The dress rehearsal for the October 28, 2006, episode, hosted by Hugh Laurie, featured a Halloween 1960 version of the sketch, but was also cut for the live episode.

== Target Lady ==
Kristen Wiig plays a nerdy, dowdy, rather dim middle-aged woman, who is extremely proud to be a Target cashier. She has an awestruck reverence for her employer, although she struggles to comprehend some basic facts, such as understanding that its logo (referred to as "the Target circles") represents a stylized bullseye. She speaks with a strange, unidentifiable accent, pronouncing long vowel sounds with an extra "r"; for example, "Target" becomes "Terget." (When Justin Timberlake complains that his lips are chapped and swollen, she remarks that it makes him look like "Angelina Jerlerr".)

As she rings up each customer, she provides unrequested and sometimes judgmental commentary on their selections. One of the items will usually attract her extreme interest, like a set of children's floaties, whereafter she runs off to find one for herself, leaving the register and customer unattended. Her uses for the items are usually peculiar, like using Degree deodorant to slow her adult slide or using satin handcuffs to stabilize household plants. Uses of large bills or unusual ringing situations cause her excitement. For example, receiving a United States fifty-dollar bill excites her to place the bill under the plastic tray. In another situation, she eats half an almond before performing a voided transaction, to support her blood sugar. She particularly loves candles ("kerndels"), and any customer with a candle among their purchases will send her into a giddy, babbling flutter.

The character was inspired by a brief conversation between Wiig and a clerk at a Los Angeles Target store, although Wiig said she was influenced by "just the accent, nothing [the clerk] actually said." Wiig originated the character while at The Groundlings, and performed it as part of her audition for SNL in 2005. "When I first did the Target lady at Groundlings, it was just a black box and me," she said in an interview. "And then the first time I showed up on set and there was a Target set with a cash register, I teared up a little bit."

In 2024, Wiig reprised her character for commercials for Target, promoting Target Circle Week ("I'm back in stock and ready to rock! It's Terget Cirkerr Week!").

Appearances

Season	Episode	Host	Notes
31	December 3, 2005	Dane Cook	Cook plays a creepy Target trainee.
31	January 21, 2006	Peter Sarsgaard	Sarsgaard plays a manager who can't help customers while the Target Lady disappears from the cash register, because he's enjoying a flavored coffee while "having one of the best breaks of [his] career."
32	December 16, 2006	Justin Timberlake	Timberlake plays a stock boy with very chapped lips, who draws the Target Lady's romantic interest.
32	February 3, 2007	Drew Barrymore	Barrymore plays a trainee very similar to the Target Lady.
33	March 15, 2008	Jonah Hill	Hill plays a Target employee, whom the Target Lady offers some romantic advice.
34	November 1, 2008	Ben Affleck	Affleck plays a UPS delivery driver with a crush on the Target Lady.
34	May 9, 2009	Justin Timberlake	Timberlake plays the Target Lady's elderly female friend, Peg, who describes a series of misadventures—"I was pushin’ a wash machine up a hill when my fashion sandal got caught on a decorative yard prick"—that led to her wearing a cervical collar. The women laugh and agree that each new misstep is "classic Peg!"
37	January 14, 2012	Daniel Radcliffe	Radcliffe plays a stock boy trying to win the Target Lady's romantic attention. Bill Hader plays "Mr. Evenings."
38	May 11, 2013	Kristen Wiig	The Target Lady has a hectic shift; she rushes a woman through the check-out lane, confronts a lesbian about wearing vests, seeks advice from a customer about a ghost "suffering between realms," and is confused about the use of Maxi-Pads.

The dress rehearsal for the April 14, 2007, episode, hosted by Shia LaBeouf, included a sketch in which LaBeouf played a Target cafe clerk who scared customers with ghost stories, but the sketch was cut for the live episode.

== Two A-Holes ==
Jason Sudeikis and Kristen Wiig portray two nameless "assholes," a preppy self-absorbed couple who love chewing gum, pop culture references, and completely ignoring the people around them. The male a-hole is a fast-talking, Bluetooth-wearing guy who does most of the talking, showering questions at his companion, whom he addresses as "babe." The female a-hole stares at her phone while absentmindedly playing with her hair, occasionally whining and performing a celebrity "impression" that is impressive only to her other half.

The sketches are written by Wiig and Sudeikis, with occasional help from John Lutz. Sudeikis described the characters' origin:

One night, we were just sort of writing late ... I said, "Hey, we should write a scene about a couple trying to buy a tree." And then, popped in the gum to just sort of stay awake. Kristen says that she sort of played that character because she didn't want to be there. I then played a variation of a guy I know exists in the world, you know, he loves her deeply, but is a jerk to other people.

One of Wiig's lines in the sketch's first appearance, "He looked like a rabbit," became a recurring joke in later sketches. According to Sudeikis, Wiig wrote the original line, which Sudeikis didn't understand and "was not that into," but he agreed to keep it after Lutz advocated for it.

Appearances

Season	Episode	Host	Notes
31	December 17, 2005	Jack Black	"Two A-Holes Buying a Christmas Tree." Black plays a tree salesman. After the salesman leaves, Wiig comments that "he looked like a rabbit"; Sudeikis later tells a concessions employee (Finesse Mitchell), "Hey, uh, the other guy looks like a rabbit!".
31	March 11, 2006	Matt Dillon	"Two A-Holes at a Travel Agency." Dillon plays a travel agent. After he leaves, Wiig and Sudeikis agree that "he looked like a rabbit."
31	May 20, 2006	Kevin Spacey	"Two A-Holes at a Crime Scene." Spacey plays a detective, interviewing the Two A-Holes about the car theft they witnessed. Describing the perp, Wiig says first that "he looked like Jesus" and later that "he looked like a rabbit."
32	October 21, 2006	John C. Reilly	"Two A-Holes Work Out with a Trainer." Reilly plays Matt, a personal trainer. Wiig imitates Astro, the dog from The Jetsons; in Astro's voice, she says "Roo rook rike a rabbit."
32	December 9, 2006	Annette Bening	"Two A-Holes in a Live Nativity Scene." Bening plays the director of a nativity scene featuring the Two A-Holes as Mary and Joseph. Wiig tells the director, "You look like Mrs. Brady."
32	January 20, 2007	Jeremy Piven	"Two A-Holes at an Adoption Agency." Piven plays an adoption agency employee. Wiig impersonates Borat and says, of the painting of a rabbit behind the employee's desk, "That painting looks like a rabbit."
33	May 17, 2008	Steve Carell	"Two A-Holes Do Karaoke." Carell plays karaoke host Peter Pops. Wiig and Sudeikis insist on telling jokes instead of singing; Wiig imitates "a cow eating grass" and "Yoda eating grass", and tells Pops, "You look like Eddie Rabbitt."
34	October 25, 2008	Jon Hamm	"Two A-Holes At An Ad Agency in the 1960s." A parody of Mad Men, featuring cameos by Elisabeth Moss and John Slattery. The Two A-Holes are unimpressed by Don Draper's pitch to promote their invention, a hula hoop attached to suspenders. Wiig imitates Marilyn Monroe and tells Roger Sterling (Slattery), "Your pocket square looks like a rabbit."

== Mike's ==
Mike (Fred Armisen) and his daughter Lexie (Scarlett Johansson) star in a crudely produced commercial for Mike's boutique store specializing in some gaudy item, claiming that if you display an item from their store in your home, "people will think you're a millionaire or somethin'." Each iteration features a new version of the catchphrase, "Ya gotta get a chand-a-lee-eh!"

Appearances

Season	Episode	Host	Notes
31	January 14, 2006	Scarlett Johansson	"Mike & Toni's Chandelier Galaxy." Rachel Dratch appears in this episode only as Mike's wife, Toni.
32	April 21, 2007	Scarlett Johansson	"Mike's Marbleopolis" (selling marble columns).
35	October 3, 2009	Ryan Reynolds	"Mike's Fountainry" (selling porcelain fountains). Cameo appearance by Johansson, who was married to Reynolds at the time. Reynolds played Mike's son-in-law, Nick.
36	November 13, 2010	Scarlett Johansson	"Mike's Busteria" (selling ceramic busts).

== Introverts' Night Out ==
Neil (Will Forte), Jean (Kristen Wiig) and the host are a group of stiff, socially awkward coworkers who attempt to have a night out at a bar, though they are clearly uncomfortable and unfamiliar with the social situations they find themselves in. Regardless, they attempt to navigate through the bar's social scene as best they can. The sketch ends with them spending the entire night at the bar and doing something extremely unexpected, given the introverted nature of their characters.

This sketch was intended to debut in an episode hosted by Natalie Portman (airdate March 4, 2006), but it was cut after the dress rehearsal. The script was then eventually reused a few episodes later.

Appearances

Season	Episode	Host	Notes
31	April 15, 2006	Lindsay Lohan	Neil, Jean, and Sally (played by Lohan) go to a bar, apparently the first time any of them had gone out in a long time. The sketch ends with the three becoming intoxicated, they discuss having a threesome.
32	December 9, 2006	Annette Bening	
32	February 24, 2007	Rainn Wilson	
34	January 31, 2009	Steve Martin	Neil, Jean, and Glenn (played by Martin) venture into a sports bar during the Super Bowl. The night ends with the three unintentionally ingesting ecstasy, believing the pills to be breath mints.

== Natalie Raps ==
Natalie Portman raps during interviews about her scandalous activities and shedding her good girl image.

Appearances

Season	Episode	Host	Notes
31	March 4, 2006	Natalie Portman	Portman is interviewed by Chris Parnell.
37	May 12, 2012	Will Ferrell	Portman appears in the 100th SNL Digital Short.
43	February 3, 2018	Natalie Portman	Portman is interviewed by Beck Bennett. Guest appearance by Andy Samberg.

Preceded by Recurring Saturday Night Live characters and sketches introduced 2004–05	Recurring Saturday Night Live characters and sketches (listed chronologically)	Succeeded by Recurring Saturday Night Live characters and sketches introduced 2006–07
