= Saturday Night Live season 40 =

Season 40 of the television series

Saturday Night Live
- Season 40
- No. of episodes: 21

Release
- Original network: NBC
- Original release: September 27, 2014 – May 16, 2015

Season chronology
- ← Previous season 39 Next → season 41

Saturday Night Live premiered its fortieth season during the 2014–15 television season on NBC. The season premiered on September 27, 2014, with host Chris Pratt and musical guest Ariana Grande and came to a conclusion on May 16, 2015, with host Louis C.K. and musical guest Rihanna. Former cast member Darrell Hammond succeeded Don Pardo, who had died in August, as the show's new announcer. The premiere included an interstitial photograph of Pardo – SNL's announcer since it premiered in 1975 (with the exception of season 7 and episode 14 of season 21 – where Hammond took his place).

This season was alternatively known as Saturday Night Live 40 and SNL40.

== Cast ==
As part of an ongoing rebuilding process, which executive producer Lorne Michaels indicated would result in cast changes for the 2014–15 season, a number of those changes were announced prior to the start of the season. Longtime cast member Nasim Pedrad, who had been on the show for five seasons since 2009, announced her departure in June 2014, as she was to star on the Lorne Michaels-produced sitcom Mulaney. Following Pedrad's departure, featured players John Milhiser, Noël Wells, and Brooks Wheelan were all let go following the finale, after only one season with the cast. Additionally, Mike O'Brien, a writer for the show for four seasons before joining the cast at the start of the previous season, returned to the writers' room for this season, which would be his last as a writer. Despite his departure from the cast, O'Brien still made occasional appearances in several sketches throughout the season. Overall, of the eight cast members introduced during the previous season, only Beck Bennett, Kyle Mooney, Colin Jost, and Sasheer Zamata returned. Bennett, Jost, Mooney and Zamata remained as featured players.

To fill the void following Pedrad, Milhiser, O'Brien, Wells, and Wheelan's departures, two comedians joined the cast at the start of the season: stand-up comic Pete Davidson, the first SNL cast member to have been born in the 1990s, and former SNL writer Michael Che as a Weekend Update co-anchor, replacing Cecily Strong, who remained in the cast. Che left SNL at the end of the previous season to become a correspondent on The Daily Show. After making appearances on Weekend Update and in several sketches, writer Leslie Jones was promoted to the cast on October 20, 2014 as a featured player.

Coinciding with the show's fortieth anniversary, SNL introduced a new logo created by design firm Pentagram.

=== Cast roster ===
**Repertory players**

- Vanessa Bayer
- Aidy Bryant
- Taran Killam
- Kate McKinnon
- Bobby Moynihan
- Jay Pharoah
- Cecily Strong
- Kenan Thompson

**bold** denotes Weekend Update anchors

**Featured players**

- Beck Bennett
- **Michael Che**
- Pete Davidson
- Leslie Jones (first episode: October 25, 2014)
- **Colin Jost**
- Kyle Mooney
- Sasheer Zamata

== Writers ==
Prior to the start of the season, five new writers were hired: Alison Rich, a performer with the Upright Citizens Brigade in New York; Nick Rutherford, a member of Los Angeles-based comedy group Good Neighbor; Natasha Rothwell, a performer with the Upright Citizens Brigade in New York; Streeter Seidell, CollegeHumor front page editor; and Jeremy Beiler, writer on Inside Amy Schumer.

Dave McCary (a film segment director who was hired the previous season) is named as a writer this season. McCary is also part of Good Neighbor, alongside co-writer Rutherford, and cast members Kyle Mooney and Beck Bennett.

Due to the departures of previous writing supervisors Marika Sawyer and John Solomon), fellow writers Chris Kelly, Sarah Schneider (both of whom previously joined the writing staff in 2011), and Kent Sublette (a writer since 2007) were named as the show's new writing supervisors.

Leslie Jones left the writing staff after the third episode, after she was promoted to the cast with Jim Carrey's episode.

As for the Weekend Update writing staff, Pete Schultz (who joined the Update writing staff in 2011), was named as the segment's head writer. Additionally, starting with the Cameron Diaz-hosted episode, Dennis McNicholas (who previously wrote for the show from 1995 to 2004; and was head writer for those last four seasons) returns to the writing staff, as a writer solely for Weekend Update. Megan Callahan-Shah also joins the Weekend Update writing staff with the Dwayne Johnson hosted episode.

This was the final season for Mike O'Brien, (an SNL writer for six years since 2009; who briefly returned to the writing staff this season after being in the cast for the previous one), and also Claire Mulaney, who joined the staff in 2013, as well as the only season for writers Natasha Rothwell, Nick Rutherford, and Alison Rich.

== Episodes ==
No. overall	No. in season	Host	Musical guest(s)	Original release date	Ratings/ Share
767	1	Chris Pratt	Ariana Grande	September 27, 2014	4.0/10
Ariana Grande performs "Break Free" and "Love Me Harder" (the latter with the Weeknd) and appears as She-Ra in the "He-Man and Lion-O" sketch.; Pratt's then-wife Anna Faris appears during the opening monologue.; Writer and future cast member Mikey Day appears in the pre-recorded "Marvel" commercial.; SNL writer Leslie Jones appears during Weekend Update and the "NFL Intros" sketch.; Michael Che and Pete Davidson's first episode as cast members, and Che's first episode as Weekend Update co-anchor.; Darrell Hammond's first episode as announcer.; After Weekend Update, an image of Don Pardo – SNL's nearly four decades long announcer, who died six weeks earlier – is shown in silence.
768	2	Sarah Silverman	Maroon 5	October 4, 2014	3.9/10
Maroon 5 performs "Animals" and "Maps".; Adam Levine appears as Freddie Mercury in the "Joan Rivers" sketch and as himself in the "Car Ride" sketch.; An image of Joan Rivers, who died a month earlier, is shown in silence following the "Joan Rivers" sketch.; Former cast member and current writer Mike O'Brien makes an appearance in the "Whites" commercial.
769	3	Bill Hader	Hozier	October 11, 2014	3.8/10
Hozier performs "Take Me to Church" and "Angel of Small Death & the Codeine Scene".; Writer and future cast member Mikey Day appears in the cold open.; Hader's Skeleton Twins co-star Kristen Wiig (SNL alumni) appears during the opening monologue, in the Hollywood Game Night sketch, introduces the tribute to Jan Hooks (alongside Hader), and introduces Hozier's second performance.; Harvey Fierstein appears during the opening monologue.; A tribute to Jan Hooks, who died two days earlier, is shown by re-airing "Love is a Dream", a sketch from 1988 with Phil Hartman.; SNL writer Leslie Jones appears during the "39 Cents" commercial.; Long time production designer Akira Yoshimura appears during the pre-recorded "Group Hopper" trailer.; Hader portrayed The Cat in the Hat in one sketch, a role he would later voice in a 2026 animated film.
770	4	Jim Carrey	Iggy Azalea	October 25, 2014	4.1/10
Iggy Azalea performs a medley of "Fancy" and "Black Widow" with Rita Ora and "Beg for It" with MØ and appears in the "Halloween Party" sketch (a dance-off to Sia's "Chandelier" music video).; Carrey's Dumb and Dumber series co-star Jeff Daniels appears in the "Carrey Family Reunion" sketch.; Leslie Jones' first episode as a cast member.
771	5	Chris Rock	Prince	November 1, 2014	4.9/10
Prince and 3RDEYEGIRL perform a medley including the songs "Clouds" (with Lianne La Havas), "Plectrumelectrum", "Marz" and "Anotherlove".; This episode marks Prince's final television performance before his death in 2016.
772	6	Woody Harrelson	Kendrick Lamar	November 15, 2014	4.1/10
Kendrick Lamar performs "I" and "Pay for It" (the latter with Chantal Kreviazuk and Jay Rock), and appears in the "Young Tarts & Old Farts" pre-taped sketch.; Harrelson's The Hunger Games series co-stars Josh Hutcherson, Liam Hemsworth and Jennifer Lawrence appear in the opening monologue.; Uzo Aduba appears in "The Dudleys" commercial.; Edward Norton appears in the unaired "Tweet" sketch.
773	7	Cameron Diaz	Mark Ronson & Bruno Mars	November 22, 2014	4.1/10
Mark Ronson and Bruno Mars perform "Uptown Funk" and "Feel Right" with Mystikal.; A memorial picture of Mike Nichols, who had died of a heart attack three days before, was shown after a "High School Theater Show" sketch.
774	8	James Franco	Nicki Minaj	December 6, 2014	4.4/10
Nicki Minaj performs "Bed of Lies" with Skylar Grey and a medley of "Only" and "All Things Go" and appears as Beyoncé in the "Jingle Ballerz Special" sketch, as Kim Kardashian on Weekend Update, and as herself in the "Brain Space" sketch.; Seth Rogen appears in the opening monologue and in the "Porn Stars With James Franco and Seth Rogen" sketch.; Mike O'Brien appears in the pre-recorded "Grow a Guy" short film.
775	9	Martin Freeman	Charli XCX	December 13, 2014	3.9/10
Charli XCX performs "Boom Clap" and "Break the Rules".
776	10	Amy Adams	One Direction	December 20, 2014	4.0/10
One Direction performs "Night Changes" and "Ready to Run" and appear in the "Girlfriends Talk Show" sketch.; Mike Myers appears as Dr. Evil in the cold open.; Kristen Wiig appears in the opening monologue and on Weekend Update.; Fred Armisen appears on Weekend Update and in the "A Very Cuban Christmas" sketch.
777	11	Kevin Hart	Sia	January 17, 2015	4.1/10
Sia performs "Elastic Heart" with Maddie Ziegler and "Chandelier".
778	12	Blake Shelton	Blake Shelton	January 24, 2015	4.7/10
Blake Shelton performs "Neon Light" and "Boys 'Round Here".; Taran Killam introduces Shelton's first musical performance.; Kate McKinnon introduces Shelton's second musical performance.
779	13	J. K. Simmons	D'Angelo	January 31, 2015	4.3/10
D'Angelo and the Vanguard performs "Really Love" and "The Charade".; Fred Armisen appears in the opening monologue.; Mike O'Brien and Jason Sudeikis appear in the pre-recorded "The Jay-Z Story" short film.
780	14	Dakota Johnson	Alabama Shakes	February 28, 2015	3.8/9
Alabama Shakes performs "Don't Wanna Fight" and "Gimme All Your Love".; Melanie Griffith and Don Johnson (Johnson's parents) appear during the opening monologue.; A title card in memory of Leonard Nimoy appears after the Star Trek-themed sketch.
781	15	Chris Hemsworth	Zac Brown Band	March 7, 2015	4.0/10
Zac Brown Band performs "Homegrown" and "Heavy Is the Head" with Chris Cornell.; Luke and Liam Hemsworth appear in the opening monologue.
782	16	Dwayne Johnson	George Ezra	March 28, 2015	3.7/9
George Ezra performs "Budapest" and "Blame It on Me".
783	17	Michael Keaton	Carly Rae Jepsen	April 4, 2015	3.7/9
Carly Rae Jepsen performs "I Really Like You" and "All That".; Mike O'Brien appears in the pre-recorded "Prom Queen" segment.; Norman Reedus appears as Daryl Dixon on Weekend Update.
784	18	Taraji P. Henson	Mumford & Sons	April 11, 2015	3.8/10
Mumford & Sons performs "The Wolf" and "Believe".; Darrell Hammond appears as Bill Clinton in the cold open.; Nikolaj Coster-Waldau appears in the pre-recorded "Game of Thrones: South Centros" sketch.; Billy Crystal appears on Weekend Update.; Numerous Muppets appear in a pre-recorded "Cookie Visits Sesame Street" sketch including Big Bird (Caroll Spinney), Elmo (Ryan Dillon), Cookie Monster (David Rudman), Count von Count (Matt Vogel), Mr. Snuffleupagus (Martin P. Robinson), Bert and Ernie (Eric Jacobson and Billy Barkhurst), Murray Monster (Joey Mazzarino), and Abby Cadabby (Leslie Carrara-Rudolph) with background appearances by the Two-Headed Monster, a Honker, and an Anything Muppet.
785	19	Scarlett Johansson	Wiz Khalifa	May 2, 2015	3.4/9
Wiz Khalifa performs "See You Again" with Charlie Puth and "We Dem Boyz", and appears during the pre-recorded "Blazer" sketch.
786	20	Reese Witherspoon	Florence + the Machine	May 9, 2015	3.7/10
Florence + the Machine performs "Ship to Wreck" and "What Kind of Man".; The mothers of Vanessa Bayer, Beck Bennett, Aidy Bryant, Pete Davidson, Kate McKinnon, Kyle Mooney, Bobby Moynihan, Jay Pharoah, Cecily Strong, Kenan Thompson, Sasheer Zamata, and Reese Witherspoon appear in the monologue – each speaking one line.
787	21	Louis C.K.	Rihanna	May 16, 2015	3.8/10
Rihanna performs "Bitch Better Have My Money" and "American Oxygen".; Darrell Hammond appears as Bill Clinton in the cold open.; Mikey Day appears on Weekend Update.

== Specials ==
Title	Original release date	US viewers (millions)
"SNL's NFL Saturday"	January 31, 2015	3.80
A selection of past sketches related to the NFL were shown. Aired sketches included: "Bob Swerski's Quiz Masters", from the season 17 episode hosted by Chevy Chase; "Schmitt's Gay", featuring Chris Farley and Adam Sandler, from the season 17 episode hosted by Steve Martin; "Sexual Harassment and You", a TV Funhouse short by Robert Smigel, from the season 30 episode hosted by Tom Brady; "NFL on CBS", from the season 32 episode hosted by Jeremy Piven; "Text Message Evidence", from the season 37 episode hosted by Eli Manning; "United Way" and "Locker Room Motivation", from the season 32 episode hosted by Peyton Manning; "Tebow", from the season 37 episode hosted by Jimmy Fallon; "NBC Football Promo", from the season 37 episode hosted by Channing Tatum; "Super Champions", from the season 39 episode hosted by Melissa McCarthy; "ESPN Bowl Madness", from the season 37 episode hosted by Charles Barkley
"An SNL Valentine"	February 14, 2015	N/A
Previous skits with a Valentine's Day theme are presented. Aired sketches included: "Dancing in the Dark" from the season 3 episode hosted by Steve Martin; "Some Dumb Little Thing from CVS" from the season 39 episode hosted by Melissa McCarthy; "The Best of T.T. & Mario" from the season 30 episode hosted by Jason Bateman; "The Love Toilet" from the season 17 episode hosted by Macaulay Culkin; Weekend Update: Daisy Rose discusses romantic comedy-themed sitcoms from the season 40 episode hosted by Jim Carrey; "A Sexy Valentine's Day Message" from the season 38 episode hosted by Justin Bieber; Weekend Update: Adam Sandler sings "Red-Hooded Sweatshirt" from the season 18 episode hosted by Alec Baldwin; "Nerds Prom Night" from the season 3 episode hosted by Buck Henry; "The Date" from the season 35 episode hosted by Megan Fox; Weekend Update: Jimmy Fallon on Valentine's Day from the season 24 episode hosted by Brendan Fraser; "The Continental" from the season 15 episode hosted by Christopher Walken; "Romantic Speech" from the season 39 episode hosted by Louis C.K.; "Gatorade Love Bucket" from the season 26 episode hosted by Mena Suvari; "Love-Ahs" from the season 27 episode hosted by Drew Barrymore; "I Just Had Sex" from the season 36 episode hosted by Jeff Bridges; "Les Jeunes de Paris" from the season 36 episode hosted by Emma Stone
"SNL 40th Red Carpet Live"	February 15, 2015	N/A
A special hosted by Matt Lauer, Savannah Guthrie, Carson Daly and Al Roker. They interviewed past hosts, current and previous cast members, and musical legends who had previously performed on the show.
"Saturday Night Live 40th Anniversary Special"	February 15, 2015	23.1 (Live+SD); 26.5 (Live+3); 5.1 million (repeat))
A three and a half hour prime-time special celebrating SNL's 40th year on the air. This special assembled together a large list of current and former cast members, hosts, and musical acts from throughout the show's forty seasons. This special became NBC's most-watched prime-time, non-sports, entertainment telecast since the ER season finale in 2004.
