= Saturday Night Live season 37 =

Season of television series

Saturday Night Live
- Season 37
- No. of episodes: 22

Release
- Original network: NBC
- Original release: September 24, 2011 – May 19, 2012

Season chronology
- ← Previous season 36 Next → season 38

The thirty-seventh season of Saturday Night Live, an American sketch comedy series, originally aired in the United States on NBC between September 24, 2011, and May 19, 2012.

== Cast ==
The season began with minimal changes to the cast, as everyone from the prior year returned. The only major change was Nasim Pedrad being upgraded to repertory status. Vanessa Bayer, Paul Brittain, Taran Killam, and Jay Pharoah all remained as featured players.

Brittain, who had joined the show for season 36 alongside Bayer, Killam, and Pharoah, exited abruptly halfway through this season, making his final appearance on January 14, 2012. Following Brittain's departure, impressionist and writer Kate McKinnon, previously a cast member on The Big Gay Sketch Show, joined the cast midseason, as a featured player, making her debut on April 7, 2012, following a March 28, 2012, report of her being hired. McKinnon is SNL's first openly gay cast member hired since Terry Sweeney in 1985, and the show's first openly gay female cast member (Denny Dillon from the 1980–81 season was SNL's first lesbian cast member but Dillon's sexuality was not public knowledge until much later).

This was the final season for longtime cast members Andy Samberg and Kristen Wiig, who had both been on for seven seasons since 2005, as well as for Abby Elliott, who had been a cast member for four seasons since 2008. Elliott was let go from the show following the finale, while Wiig and Samberg both left on their own terms.

=== Cast roster ===
**Repertory players**

- Fred Armisen
- Abby Elliott
- Bill Hader
- **Seth Meyers**
- Bobby Moynihan
- Nasim Pedrad
- Andy Samberg
- Jason Sudeikis
- Kenan Thompson
- Kristen Wiig

**Featured players**

- Vanessa Bayer
- Paul Brittain (final episode: January 14, 2012)
- Taran Killam
- Kate McKinnon (first episode: April 7, 2012)
- Jay Pharoah

bold denotes Weekend Update anchor

== Writers ==
This season saw several new writers. CollegeHumor writer Sarah Schneider was added to the writing staff, after serving as a guest writer for the last five episodes of season 36. Also added were Chris Kelly, who previously wrote for Funny or Die and The Onion News Network; Zach Kanin, who worked on the Harvard Lampoon; and Peter Schultz, a performer from the Upright Citizens Brigade Theater, who was hired to write for Weekend Update.

Additionally, starting with this season, writers Erik Kenward (who has been with the show since 2001) and John Mulaney (who previously joined the writing staff in 2008) are named as producers of the show. Mulaney was previously a writing supervisor for the past two seasons, and Bryan Tucker and Colin Jost continue on as the two writing supervisors, this season.

This was also the last season for writer/producer Mulaney, after four years with the show.

The season saw the deaths of three former SNL writers. Nelson Lyon died at the age of 73 due to liver cancer; Lyon wrote for the show during its seventh season. Mark O'Donnell, who also wrote during the show's seventh season, died of a heart attack at the age of 58 outside his apartment in New York. Tom Davis, who was one of the original SNL writers and appeared in multiple sketches over the years died after a three-year battle with throat and neck cancer.

== Episodes ==
No. overall	No. in season	Host	Musical guest(s)	Original release date	Ratings/ Share
703	1	Alec Baldwin	Radiohead	September 24, 2011	5.0/13
Radiohead performs "Lotus Flower" and "Staircase".; Steve Martin and Seth Rogen appear in the opening monologue.; Clive Deamer plays additional drums and percussion for both of Radiohead's performances.; Jay Pharoah, although credited, does not appear in this episode.
704	2	Melissa McCarthy	Lady Antebellum	October 1, 2011	5.2/13
Lady Antebellum performs "We Owned the Night" and "Just a Kiss".
705	3	Ben Stiller	Foster the People	October 8, 2011	4.8/12
Foster the People performs "Pumped Up Kicks" and "Houdini".; Hugh Jackman appears as Daniel Radcliffe in The Best of Both Worlds with Hugh Jackman, alongside Andy Samberg's impersonation of Jackman.; Stiller reprises his role as Derek Zoolander from the movie Zoolander during Weekend Update.; Kenny G plays soprano sax during Foster the People's performance of "Houdini".; Writer Mike O'Brien appears as Max Weinberg during the "Bruce Springsteen: Just the Stories" sketch.
706	4	Anna Faris	Drake	October 15, 2011	4.8/12
Drake performs "Headlines" and "Make Me Proud" and appears in the SNL Digital Short and Weekend Update.; Nicki Minaj joins Drake for his second performance.
707	5	Charlie Day	Maroon 5	November 5, 2011	4.9/11
Maroon 5 performs "Moves Like Jagger" and "Stereo Hearts". Adam Levine also appears in the "Kings of Catchphrase Comedy" commercial and the Greek Economy sketch.; Gym Class Heroes' Travie McCoy joins Maroon 5 for their second performance.; Day's It's Always Sunny in Philadelphia co-star Danny DeVito appears in the opening monologue.
708	6	Emma Stone	Coldplay	November 12, 2011	4.5/11
Coldplay performs "Paradise" and "Every Teardrop Is a Waterfall" and appears in the "Someone Like You" sketch. Chris Martin also appears in the "Garth and Kat" segment on Weekend Update.; Stone's The Amazing Spider-Man co-star Andrew Garfield appears in the opening monologue.; The song A Cause Des Garçons by Yelle is played during the Les jeunes de Paris sketch.
709	7	Jason Segel	Florence + The Machine	November 19, 2011	4.6/11
Florence + the Machine performs "Shake It Out" and "No Light, No Light". Florence Welch also appears in the "New Jack Thanksgiving" sketch and the "Massachusetts Afternoon" sketch.; The Muppets - Kermit the Frog (Steve Whitmire), Miss Piggy (Eric Jacobson), Rowlf the Dog (Bill Barretta), Fozzie Bear (Jacobson), Gonzo the Great (Dave Goelz), Scooter (David Rudman), Camilla the Chicken (Matt Vogel) and Statler and Waldorf (Whitmire and Goelz respectively) appear in the opening monologue. Additionally, Kermit the Frog appears in a Weekend Update segment, and Rowlf and Gonzo appear in the "Massachusetts Afternoon" sketch.; Paul Rudd appears in the "Vogelchecks' Thanksgiving" sketch and the "Massachusetts Afternoon" sketch.; James Franco is shown in a family photo at the end of the "Vogelchecks' Thanksgiving" sketch, reprising his role as a member of the Vogelcheck family.; Former Utah Governor (and candidate for the 2012 Republican presidential primary) Jon Huntsman Jr. appears on Weekend Update.; Olivia Wilde appears in the SNL Digital Short.
710	8	Steve Buscemi	The Black Keys	December 3, 2011	4.8/11
The Black Keys perform "Lonely Boy" and "Gold on the Ceiling".; Maya Rudolph appears as Whitney Houston in "The Miley Cyrus Show" sketch.
711	9	Katy Perry	Robyn	December 10, 2011	4.8/11
Robyn performs "Call Your Girlfriend" and "Dancing on My Own".; Darrell Hammond appears in the cold open as Donald Trump.; Matt Damon and Val Kilmer appear in the SNL Digital Short.; Alec Baldwin appears on Weekend Update.
712	10	Jimmy Fallon	Michael Bublé	December 17, 2011	5.3/13
Michael Bublé performs "Holly Jolly Christmas" and "Have Yourself a Merry Little Christmas". Additionally, Bublé appears in the opening monologue and in the "Michael Bublé's Christmas Duets" sketch.; Rachel Dratch and Amy Poehler appear in the "Boston Teens" cold open.; Chris Kattan, Tracy Morgan and Horatio Sanz make cameo appearances to reprise "Christmas is Number One" with host Jimmy Fallon. Additionally, Sanz and Kattan appear in the "Beethoven's 9th Symphony" sketch.; Tina Fey, Jude Law and Amy Poehler appear on Weekend Update.; Will Arnett cameos during the goodnights.
713	11	Charles Barkley	Kelly Clarkson	January 7, 2012	7.4/18
Kelly Clarkson performs "Stronger (What Doesn't Kill You)" and "Mr. Know It All".; This episode was delayed due to the Lions at Saints football game.
714	12	Daniel Radcliffe	Lana Del Rey	January 14, 2012	5.2/12
Lana Del Rey performs "Video Games" and "Blue Jeans".; Paul Brittain's final episode as a cast member.
715	13	Channing Tatum	Bon Iver	February 4, 2012	4.7/11
Bon Iver performs "Holocene" and "Beth/Rest".
716	14	Zooey Deschanel	Karmin	February 11, 2012	5.0/12
Karmin performs "Brokenhearted" and "I Told You So".; Jean Dujardin appears in the Les jeunes de Paris sketch.; Nicolas Cage appears on Weekend Update alongside Andy Samberg's portrayal of Nicolas Cage.; After the crab sketch, a picture of Whitney Houston alongside Molly Shannon from a Mary Katherine Gallagher sketch was shown; Houston's death had been reported just hours before the episode premiered.
717	15	Maya Rudolph	Sleigh Bells	February 18, 2012	4.9/12
Sleigh Bells perform "Comeback Kid" and "End of the Line".; Paul Simon appears in the opening monologue.; Amy Poehler appears during the Bronx Beat sketch (reprising her role as Betty Caruso), Weekend Update, and "The Obama Show" sketch (reprising her impersonation of Hillary Clinton).; Justin Timberlake appears during the Bronx Beat sketch and the "Blue Ivy" sketch (impersonating Justin Vernon).; Bill O'Reilly and Kate Upton appear during "What Up with That?".
718	16	Lindsay Lohan	Jack White	March 3, 2012	5.5/14
Jack White performs "Love Interruption" and "Sixteen Saltines".; Ruby Amanfu performs backing vocals during White's first performance.; Jimmy Fallon and Jon Hamm appear in the opening monologue. Hamm also appears during Weekend Update.; SNL writer and future cast member Mike O'Brien appears during the cold open as one of Mitt Romney's sons.
719	17	Jonah Hill	The Shins	March 10, 2012	4.3/11
The Shins perform "Simple Song" and "It's Only Life".; Tom Hanks appears in the opening monologue.; John McEnroe appears in the SNL Digital Short.
720	18	Sofía Vergara	One Direction	April 7, 2012	5.0/16
One Direction performs "What Makes You Beautiful" and "One Thing" and appears in "The Manuel Ortiz Show" sketch.; Manolo Gonzalez appears in the opening monologue.; Kate McKinnon's first episode as a cast member.
721	19	Josh Brolin	Gotye	April 14, 2012	4.6/11
Gotye performs "Somebody That I Used to Know" and "Eyes Wide Open" and appears in the second SNL Digital Short.; This episode featured the first installment of “The Californians”, “Stuart Has Cancer”.; Kimbra joins Gotye on his first performance.; Steven Spielberg appears in the first SNL Digital Short.
722	20	Eli Manning	Rihanna	May 5, 2012	5.2/13
Rihanna performs a medley of "Birthday Cake" and "Talk That Talk" and "Where Have You Been".; Manning's wife Abby McGrew appears in the opening monologue, along with Manning's New York Giants teammates Chris Snee, David Baas, David Diehl, and Shaun O'Hara.; Sacha Baron Cohen (as Admiral General Aladeen from The Dictator) and Martin Scorsese appear on Weekend Update.; A short clip of the Beastie Boys performing "Sure Shot" from season 20 is shown after Weekend Update; and featured group Adam Yauch, who had died the previous day.
723	21	Will Ferrell	Usher	May 12, 2012	5.1/13
Usher performs "Scream" and "Climax" and appears in the SNL Digital Short and the "2012 Funkytown Debate" sketch.; Ferrell's mother, Betty Kay Ferrell, appears in the opening monologue.; Ana Gasteyer appears in the "LGBT Prom" sketch, reprising her role as Bobbi Mohan-Culp.; Will Forte appears in the "ESPN Classic" sketch and the "25th Anniversary Celebration" sketch, reprising his roles as Greg Stink and Hamilton respectively.; Justin Bieber, Michael Bolton, Julian Casablancas, Jon Hamm, Natalie Portman, Akiva Schaffer, Jorma Taccone and Justin Timberlake appear in the 100th SNL Digital Short.; Liam Neeson appears on Weekend Update with Andy Samberg as Nicolas Cage.; Fred Armisen's final episode impersonating President Barack Obama before giving it to Jay Pharaoh.
724	22	Mick Jagger	Mick Jagger (with Arcade Fire, Foo Fighters, Jeff Beck)	May 19, 2012	5.2/13
Mick Jagger performs "The Last Time" with Arcade Fire (The Strokes' bassist Nikolai Fraiture also appears with the group), a medley of "19th Nervous Breakdown" and "It's Only Rock 'n Roll (But I Like It)" with Foo Fighters, and "Tea Party", an original blues tune with Jeff Beck and the SNL Band. At the end of the show, Arcade Fire performs a medley of the Rolling Stones' "She's a Rainbow" and "Ruby Tuesday" as a tribute to the departing Kristen Wiig.; Jon Hamm appears in the "Lawrence Welk Show" cold open.; Chris Parnell appears in the SNL Digital Short, "Lazy Sunday 2". He also appears during the goodnights.; Steve Martin appears in "The Californians" sketch. He also appears during the goodnights.; Jason Sudeikis introduces Jagger's second musical performance.; Rachel Dratch, Will Forte, Chris Kattan, Amy Poehler and Lorne Michaels appear during the goodnights.; Abby Elliott, Andy Samberg and Kristen Wiig's final episode as cast members.
