= Paul Brittain =

American actor & comedian (born 1977)

- Born: February 16, 1977 (age 49); Naperville, Illinois, U.S.
- Occupations: Actor, comedian
- Years active: 2007–present
- Relatives: Bob Newhart (uncle)

Paul Brittain (born February 16, 1977) is an American actor and comedian. He is best known for his tenure as a cast member on the NBC sketch comedy series Saturday Night Live from 2010 to 2012.

== Early life and education ==
Brittain was born and raised in Naperville, Illinois. He graduated from Naperville North High School in 1995. He attended the University of Illinois at Urbana–Champaign, where he majored in finance and Spanish, graduating in 2000.

Brittain is the nephew of comedian Bob Newhart.

== Career ==
He is a veteran performer at the iO Theater in Chicago where he trained with SNL castmate Vanessa Bayer and performed as a member with numerous improv and sketch groups. He has appeared on Sports Action Team.

=== Saturday Night Live ===
Brittain joined the cast of Saturday Night Live for the 36th season on September 25, 2010. His recurring characters included Lord Cecil Wyndemere (a childlike, 48-year-old lord), Goran "Funky Boy" Bogdan (a Croatian stand-up comic who punctuates his jokes with "Oooh, funky boy!"), and "Sex Ed" Vincent (a low-rent sex counselor who holds seminars in shady hotels). Brittain's celebrity impressions included Ron Paul, James Franco, and Johnny Depp. Brittain's uncle, Bob Newhart hosted SNL in its fifth (1979–1980) and 20th (1994–1995) seasons, making Brittain the second SNL cast member to be the nephew of a celebrity who hosted SNL more than once (after Jason Sudeikis, whose uncle is semi-frequent 1990s host George Wendt).

Brittain exited SNL midway through his second season, making his final appearance on January 14, 2012.

==== Recurring characters ====
- Marius, one of the French teens in "Les Jeunes de Paris"
- Goran "Funky Boy" Bogdan, a Croatian stand-up comic
- "Sex" Ed Vincent, a middle-aged "sex expert" who holds couples seminars
- Lord Cecil Wyndemere, a foppish man-child who's actually 48 years old

==== Celebrity impressions ====
- Johnny Depp
- James Franco
- Vili Fualaau
- Harry Reid
- Dax Holt
- Ron Paul
- Michael Gelman
- Osama bin Laden
- Tom Felton (as Draco Malfoy)

== Filmography ==
=== Film ===
Year	Title	Role	Notes
2012	Hotel Transylvania	Zombie Plumber, Hydra Head (voice)	
2013	Grown Ups 2	Male Cheerleader	Cameo
2015	Hotel Transylvania 2	Pandragora (voice)	
2016	Sasq-Watch!	Nigel	
2017	Killing Gunther	Gabe	
2019	The Night Is Young	Connor	
2023	Leo	Eli's Dad, Stopwatch #2, Stopwatch #3 (voice)	

=== Television ===
Year	Title	Role	Notes
2010–2012	Saturday Night Live	Himself / Various Characters	Featured player (seasons 36 and 37)
2013	Hello Ladies	Paul	Episode: "The Wedding"
2013–2014	Trophy Wife	Tevin	Recurring role, 5 episodes
2014	Kroll Show	The Kid / Mateas Soto	2 episodes
2014–2015	Comedy Bang! Bang!	Jones Calvins / Richard Bunn	2 episodes
2017	Shrink	Gil Reeves	Episode: "Cool Ranch"
2022–2025	The Simpsons	Brandon / Shawn Garrett Evanson (voice)	Episodes: "From Beer to Paternity", "Thrifty Ways to Thieve Your Mother"
2026	Strip Law	(voice)	Episode: "Crypt Law Presents: Fearacle on 31st Day"
