= Saturday Night Live season 32 =

Saturday Night Live
- Season 32
- No. of episodes: 20

Release
- Original network: NBC
- Original release: September 30, 2006 – May 19, 2007

Season chronology
- ← Previous season 31 Next → season 33

The thirty-second season of Saturday Night Live, an American sketch comedy series, originally aired in the United States on NBC between September 30, 2006, and May 19, 2007.

== History ==
As in the previous season, The Lonely Island created another popular SNL Digital Short that aired around Christmas time; this time, it was the R&B video spoof "Dick in a Box" (featuring host Justin Timberlake). The short won a Creative Arts Emmy for Outstanding Music and Lyrics.

== Cast ==
Before the start of the season, the show suffered "massive budget cuts" at NBC. Lorne Michaels said that cutting staff was chosen over reducing from 20 the number of original episodes produced. As a result, longtime cast members Chris Parnell and Horatio Sanz, who had both been on the show for eight seasons since 1998, were fired from the show, along with Finesse Mitchell, who had been a cast member for three seasons since 2003. This was the second time Parnell had been fired from the show due to budget cuts, the first being after the 2000–01 season ended. In addition, longtime cast members Rachel Dratch (who had been on the show for seven seasons since 1999) and Tina Fey (who had been a staff writer since 1997, and a cast member for six seasons since 2000) left the show on their own terms, as both were to begin work on the NBC sitcom 30 Rock.

Bill Hader, Andy Samberg, Jason Sudeikis, and Kristen Wiig were all promoted to repertory status. This was the smallest cast in recent memory, with only 11 people.

With Fey's departure, Seth Meyers became Amy Poehler's co-anchor on Weekend Update. Don Roy King was hired as director, replacing Beth McCarthy-Miller.

=== Cast roster ===
Repertory players

- Fred Armisen
- Will Forte
- Bill Hader
- Darrell Hammond
- **Seth Meyers**
- **Amy Poehler**
- Maya Rudolph
- Andy Samberg
- Jason Sudeikis
- Kenan Thompson
- Kristen Wiig

bold denotes Weekend Update anchor

== Writers ==
With this season, Paula Pell (who had been a writer on the show since 1995) is named as a co-head writer, alongside Seth Meyers and Harper Steele.

Future writing supervisors Marika Sawyer and John Solomon join the writing staff with this season.

Longtime writer Jim Downey also returns to the writing staff this season.

Lastly, this is the final season for longtime writer Matt Murray (who had been with the show since 2000), as he left the show after seven years.

== Episodes ==
| No. overall | No. in season | Host | Musical guest(s) | Original release date |
|---|---|---|---|---|
| 605 | 1 | Dane Cook | The Killers | September 30, 2006 |
The Killers perform "When You Were Young" and "Bones", the latter with SNL Band members Lenny Pickett, Earl Gardner, and Steve Turre.; Brian Williams appears in a brief sketch immediately before Weekend Update; in it, Williams briefly talks to Poehler believing he would be the new co-anchor, and appearing visibly disappointed when Meyers revealed he was picked instead.; Seth Meyers' first episode as Weekend Update co-anchor.; Don Roy King's first episode as director.
| 606 | 2 | Jaime Pressly | Corinne Bailey Rae | October 7, 2006 |
Corinne Bailey Rae performs "Put Your Records On" and "Like a Star".
| 607 | 3 | John C. Reilly | My Chemical Romance | October 21, 2006 |
My Chemical Romance performs "Welcome to the Black Parade" and "Cancer".; Will Ferrell, Reilly's Talladega Nights: The Ballad of Ricky Bobby co-star, appears as James Lipton in the opening monologue.
| 608 | 4 | Hugh Laurie | Beck | October 28, 2006 |
Beck performs "Nausea" and "Clap Hands".; Sacha Baron Cohen and Ken Davitian appear in the cold open, reprising their Borat roles as Borat Sagdiyev and Azamat Bagatov.; Laurie performs "The Protest Song" from A Bit of Fry & Laurie.
| 609 | 5 | Alec Baldwin | Christina Aguilera | November 11, 2006 |
Christina Aguilera performs "Ain't No Other Man," "Hurt," and "Steppin' Out with My Baby" with Tony Bennett. Additionally, Bennett appears in The Tony Bennett Show sketch.; Tina Fey and Tracy Morgan, Baldwin's 30 Rock co-stars, appear in the opening monologue.; Takeru Kobayashi appears in the pre-filmed TV Funhouse cartoon "Kobayashi".; Steve Martin, Paul McCartney, and Martin Short appear in the "Platinum Lounge" sketch.
| 610 | 6 | Ludacris | Ludacris | November 18, 2006 |
Ludacris performs "Money Maker" and "Runaway Love" with Mary J. Blige.; Jason Sudeikis' first episode impersonating George W. Bush, taking over the role from Will Forte.; Amy Poehler, Maya Rudolph, and Kristen Wiig introduce Ludacris' first musical performance.; Kenan Thompson introduces Ludacris' second musical performance.
| 611 | 7 | Matthew Fox | Tenacious D | December 2, 2006 |
Tenacious D performs "Kickapoo" and "The Metal", with JR Reed, Fred Armisen, Bill Hader, Amy Poehler, Maya Rudolph, Andy Samberg, Jason Sudekis, and Kristen Wiig appearing during the latter performance.
| 612 | 8 | Annette Bening | Gwen Stefani; Akon | December 9, 2006 |
Gwen Stefani performs "Wind It Up".; Akon performs "I Wanna Love You".; Alec Baldwin appears in the opening monologue and the pre-filmed "Valtrex" sketch, a repeat from the episode he hosted earlier in the season.; Matthew Fox appears in an SNL Digital Short.
| 613 | 9 | Justin Timberlake | Justin Timberlake | December 16, 2006 |
Justin Timberlake performs "My Love" and "What Goes Around... Comes Around".; Jimmy Fallon appears in The Barry Gibb Talk Show sketch and introduces Timberlake's second performance.; Cameron Diaz, Timberlake's then-girlfriend, introduces his first performance.; After the episode, NBC put an uncensored version of the Digital Short "Dick in a Box" on its website and YouTube. It quickly became an Internet phenomenon, much like "Lazy Sunday" did a year earlier, and won an Emmy in 2007.
| 614 | 10 | Jake Gyllenhaal | The Shins | January 13, 2007 |
The Shins perform "Phantom Limb" and "New Slang".
| 615 | 11 | Jeremy Piven | AFI | January 20, 2007 |
AFI performs "Love Like Winter" and "Miss Murder".; Common appears in the "Blizzard Man" sketch.; A picture of Michael DiBari, a cameraman who had died of cancer earlier in the week, was shown before the goodnights.
| 616 | 12 | Drew Barrymore | Lily Allen | February 3, 2007 |
Lily Allen performs "Smile" and "LDN".; Horatio Sanz appears as Elton John in the "Versace Super Bowl Party".; Barrymore reprises her role as Charlie McGee from the movie Firestarter in the "Firestarter Brand Smoked Sausages" sketch.
| 617 | 13 | Forest Whitaker | Keith Urban | February 10, 2007 |
Keith Urban performs "Stupid Boy" and "Once in a Lifetime".
| 618 | 14 | Rainn Wilson | Arcade Fire | February 24, 2007 |
Arcade Fire performs "Intervention" and "Keep the Car Running", and appear in the SNL Digital Short. Following the show, the band performs "Rebellion (Lies)" and "Wake Up" for the studio audience.; Rashida Jones, Wilson's The Office co-star, appears during the opening monologue in character.
| 619 | 15 | Julia Louis-Dreyfus | Snow Patrol | March 17, 2007 |
Snow Patrol performs "You're All I Have" and "Chasing Cars".; Chris Rock appears in the cold open.
| 620 | 16 | Peyton Manning | Carrie Underwood | March 24, 2007 |
Carrie Underwood performs "Before He Cheats" and "Wasted".; Archie Manning, Eli Manning, and Olivia Manning, Manning's father, brother, and mother, respectively, appear in the opening monologue. Additionally, Eli and Cooper Manning, Manning's other brother, appear during the goodnights, wheeling out a cake to celebrate the fact that Peyton Manning was hosting the show on his thirty-first birthday.; Dan Aykroyd appears on Weekend Update.
| 621 | 17 | Shia LaBeouf | Avril Lavigne | April 14, 2007 |
Avril Lavigne performs "Girlfriend" and "I Can Do Better," and appears as Elle Fanning in the Dakota Fanning Show sketch.; Alec Baldwin appears in the pre-filmed "Hathaway Mustache Ride Company" sketch.
| 622 | 18 | Scarlett Johansson | Björk | April 21, 2007 |
Björk performs "Earth Intruders" and "Wanderlust".; New York Senator Chuck Schumer appears in the pre-filmed portion of the cold open.
| 623 | 19 | Molly Shannon | Linkin Park | May 12, 2007 |
Linkin Park performs "What I've Done" and "Bleed It Out".
| 624 | 20 | Zach Braff | Maroon 5 | May 19, 2007 |
Maroon 5 performs "Makes Me Wonder" and "Won't Go Home Without You".; Braff's Scrubs co-stars Donald Faison and Sarah Chalke were in attendance for this episode.

== Specials ==
| Title | Original release date |
|---|---|
| "The Best of Darrell Hammond" | November 4, 2006 |
This is the first (and only) time a "Best Of" special was made while the cast member in question was still in the cast at the time. Sketches include "Hardball," "Celebrity Jeopardy," "Meet the Press," "First Presidential Debate," "CBS Evening Anthrax Update," "Californians for Schwarzenegger," "Jesse Jackson," "Bill Kurtis Looping Session," "The O'Reilly Factor," "NBC Special Report," "Geraldo," "Guiliani's Press Conference," "Jimmy Carter in Cuba," "Ashcroft's Press Conference," "Celebration of Women Week," and "White House Friends".
| "The Best of 2006–2007" | May 5, 2007 |
This special aired as a compilation of some of the season's most memorable sketches. Because it aired before the season ended, no sketches from subsequent episodes hosted by Zach Braff and Molly Shannon were included in the special.
| "SNL in the '90s: Pop Culture Nation" | May 6, 2007 |
Topics discussed include: Lorne Michaels preventing another Jean Doumanian-esque era by keeping his cast and repopulating the show with featured players (instead of letting the entire cast go and hiring new people), sketches centered on the 1992 U.S. Presidential election, how Wayne's World became popular on and off the show, SNL's raunchy turn with the hiring of Adam Sandler, David Spade, and Chris Farley, the departure of Phil Hartman, season 20 as yet another series low point, cast feuds, Lorne Michaels overhauling his show once again with new cast members and writers, how the female cast members gained prominence in a male-oriented show, SNL gaining popularity for its sketches on the Bill Clinton/Monica Lewinsky sex scandal and the upcoming U.S. election for the year 2000, and the famous "Blue Oyster Cult/More Cowbell" sketch from the season 25 Christopher Walken episode. Alec Baldwin, Dana Carvey, Tom Davis, James Downey, Jimmy Fallon, Will Ferrell, Tina Fey, Al Franken, Ana Gasteyer, John Goodman, Darrell Hammond, Tim Herlihy, Chris Kattan, David Koechner, Norm Macdonald, Tim Meadows, Adam McKay, Lorne Michaels, Mike Myers, Kevin Nealon, Don Ohlmeyer, Cheri Oteri, Colin Quinn, Chris Rock, Molly Shannon, Sarah Silverman, Robert Smigel, David Spade, Julia Sweeney gave insight in the special.
