= Mike O'Brien (actor) =

American actor and writer (born 1976)

- Born: Michael Patrick O'Brien; June 22, 1976 (age 50); Blissfield, Michigan, U.S.
- Education: University of Michigan
- Notable work: Saturday Night Live; A.P. Bio

Comedy career
- Medium: Television, film, acting, writing
- Genres: Improvisational comedy, sketch comedy

Michael Patrick O'Brien (born June 22, 1976) is an American comedian. He was a writer on the NBC sketch comedy series Saturday Night Live from 2009 to 2015, and a featured player for one season. He is also the creator of the 2018 NBC comedy series A.P. Bio.

== Career ==
O'Brien was born in Blissfield, Michigan, to Connie and James O’Brien. He graduated from the University of Michigan in 1999, where he majored in film-video and was the founder and editor of a monthly comedy newspaper named The Anti-Daily.

O'Brien moved to Chicago and began taking improv and sketch classes. At iO Chicago he performed with a group called The Reckoning (2001–present). He trained at the Second City in Chicago, eventually joining the company's mainstage, where he performed for one year as a part of "America: All Better".

=== Saturday Night Live ===
O'Brien worked as a staff writer on Saturday Night Live for seven seasons, joining the show in 2009, and also appeared as a featured player for the 2013–14 season. After his sole season as a featured player, he left the cast but continued to write for the show in his final season from 2014 to 2015. Some of O'Brien's sketches include "Monster Pals" starring James Franco as well as "Puppet Class" starring Bill Hader. His short films "Grow a Guy" and "The Jay-Z Story" were each given the title card, "A Mike O'Brien Picture" in season 40. After leaving the writing staff in season 41, O'Brien continued to contribute short films under the title, A Mike O'Brien Picture for a brief period.

=== 7 Minutes in Heaven with Mike O'Brien ===
In 2011, O'Brien introduced 7 Minutes in Heaven with Mike O'Brien, a comedy routine in which he interviews celebrities in a closet and closes by trying to kiss the celebrity.

=== Tasty Radio ===
In 2015, O'Brien released a sketch comedy album entitled Tasty Radio, which features Bill Hader, Fred Armisen, Jason Sudeikis, Vanessa Bayer, Seth Meyers, John Mulaney, Jorma Taccone, John Lutz and Scarlett Johansson.

=== A.P. Bio ===
In 2018, he created the comedy series A.P. Bio, starring Glenn Howerton and Patton Oswalt. O'Brien's former SNL colleagues Lorne Michaels and Seth Meyers are also executive producers on the show. The series premiered on February 1, 2018. The series was canceled after two seasons on May 24, 2019. On July 17, 2019, it was announced that A.P. Bio would return for a third season on NBCU's streaming platform Peacock in 2020, and the show was renewed for a fourth season which ran in 2021 before the show was canceled again.

== Filmography ==
=== As actor ===
Year	Title	Role	Notes
2009–16	Saturday Night Live	Various	TV Series: 44 Episodes
2013	Portlandia	Birthday Invitee	TV Series: 1 Episode
2014	Late Night with Seth Meyers	Coffeehouse Customer	TV Series: 1 Episode
2014–15	Above Average Presents	Husband	TV Series: 2 Episodes
2015	Staten Island Summer	Chuck	
2015	Documentary Now!	Young Alexander Krauss	TV Series: 1 Episode
2016	Brother Nature	Nick (Karaoke)	
2016	Comedy Bang! Bang!	H. Marcus McGwire	TV Series: 1 Episode
2016–17	Virtually Mike and Nora	Various	TV Series: 5 Episode
2017	Idiotsitter		TV Series: 1 Episode
2019	Sword of Trust	Yach	
2019	Booksmart	Pat the Pizza Guy	
2021	I Think You Should Leave with Tim Robinson	Jeff	TV Series: 1 Episode
2024	What We Do in the Shadows	Jerry the Vampire	TV Series: recurring

=== As writer ===
Year	Title	Notes
2009–16	Saturday Night Live	TV Series: 103 Episodes
2009–12	Saturday Night Live Weekend Update Thursday	TV Series: 5 Episodes
2013	28th Independent Spirit Awards	TV Special
2014–16	Above Average Presents	TV Series: 3 Episodes
2016–17	Virtually Mike and Nora	TV Series: 5 Episodes; Also Executive Producer/Director
2017	Man Seeking Woman	TV Series: 2 Episodes; Also Supervising Producer: 3 Episodes
2018–21	A.P. Bio	TV Series: 42 Episodes; Also Creator/Executive Producer; Also Director: 1 Episode
2019	Sword of Trust	
2021	I Think You Should Leave with Tim Robinson	TV Series: 1 Episode

== Bibliography ==
- O'Brien, Mike (December 7, 2015). "How to live an alternative–comedy lifestyle". Shouts & Murmurs. The New Yorker. Vol. 91, no. 39. p. 37.
