= Saturday Night Live season 35 =

Saturday Night Live
- Season 35
- No. of episodes: 22

Release
- Original network: NBC
- Original release: September 26, 2009 – May 15, 2010

Season chronology
- ← Previous season 34 Next → season 36

The thirty-fifth season of Saturday Night Live (also branded SNL 35), an American sketch comedy series, originally aired in the United States on NBC between September 26, 2009, and May 15, 2010.

A total of 22 episodes were broadcast during the show's eight-month-long season, which included a two-week break in February due to the 2010 Winter Olympics. The season was accompanied by three prime-time episodes of Saturday Night Live Weekend Update Thursday and three prime-time SNL clip shows.

This season introduced a new opening montage, which was shot using the Canon EOS 5D Mark II and Canon EOS 7D digital SLR cameras. Typical elements are recorded at thirty frames per second (fps), with slow-motion sequences shot at sixty fps, both in full 1080p high definition.

A notable moment of the season was when an internet campaign was created to get actress Betty White to host an episode of the show. The campaign was started in early 2010 on Facebook and the group was called "Betty White to Host SNL (please?)!" The campaign was successful, and White became the oldest person ever to host the show. For White's episode, Lorne Michaels brought back former cast members Rachel Dratch, Tina Fey, Ana Gasteyer, Amy Poehler, Maya Rudolph and Molly Shannon. The episode garnered the show's highest ratings in over a year. with a rating of 5.8 in the 18–49 rating, demographic and with 12.1 million viewers overall.

== Cast ==
Prior to the start of the season, Darrell Hammond, who was the last cast member from the 1990s, left the show. At the time, Hammond became the longest-running cast member with a total of 14 seasons, though he would later be surpassed by Kenan Thompson in 2017. Following Hammond's departure, featured players Michaela Watkins and Casey Wilson were both let go from the show after the finale of the previous season. Wilson had been on the show for two seasons, while Watkins had been on for only one. To account for the absences of Watkins and Wilson, the show brought in two new female featured players as replacements, comedian and writer Nasim Pedrad of The Groundlings and stand-up comic Jenny Slate. Abby Elliott and Bobby Moynihan remained as featured players.

This would be the final season for longtime cast member Will Forte, who had been on the show for 8 seasons since 2002. This would also be the only season for Slate, who was let go at the end of the season.

=== Cast roster ===
**Repertory players**

- Fred Armisen
- Will Forte
- Bill Hader
- **Seth Meyers**
- Andy Samberg
- Jason Sudeikis
- Kenan Thompson
- Kristen Wiig

**Featured players**

- Abby Elliott
- Bobby Moynihan
- Nasim Pedrad
- Jenny Slate

bold denotes Weekend Update anchor

== Writers ==
Second City theater performer Mike O'Brien joins the writing staff. He would join the cast for the show's thirty-ninth season.

Additionally, starting with this season, writers Colin Jost (who has been writing for the show since 2005), Emily Spivey (who had been writing for the show since 2001), and John Mulaney (who was hired at the start of the previous season in 2008), were named as this season's writing supervisors, replacing Paula Pell (who took a brief leave of absence).

Starting with the Tina-Fey hosted episode, Pell (who had been a writer on the show since 1995, and was gone for most of the season) returns to the writing staff. This episode would also be the last for longtime writer Spivey, as she left the show following this episode, after nine years as a writer.

Also, starting with the following Ryan Phillipe-hosted episode, Bryan Tucker (a writer for the show since 2005) is named as the new co-writer supervisor, alongside Jost and Mulaney.

Season 35 would also prove to be the final season for fellow longtime writer/Lonely Island member Jorma Taccone (who had been a writer since 2005), as he left the show after five years. He would make contributions to select future Lonely Island sketches.

This was also the final season for another longtime writer, John Lutz (who had been with writing staff since 2004), as he left the show after 6½ years.

== Episodes ==
No. overall	No. in season	Host	Musical guest	Original release date	Ratings/ Share
659	1	Megan Fox	U2	September 26, 2009	4.6/11
U2 performs "Breathe", "Moment of Surrender" and "Ultraviolet (Light My Way)".; A new opening sequence, which mentions SNL's 35 years on-air, debuts with this episode.; During the "Biker Chick Chat" sketch, Slate accidentally says, "You stood up for yourself, and I fuckin' love you for that." Most of the sketch before and after consisted of everyone saying "Friggin'," "frickin'" or "freakin'". Slate quickly holds her breath after realizing her mistake.; Brian Austin Green cameoed in the Transformers Digital Short.; Nasim Pedrad and Jenny Slate's first episode as cast members.
660	2	Ryan Reynolds	Lady Gaga	October 3, 2009	4.7/12
Lady Gaga performs "Paparazzi" and a medley of songs including "Bad Romance", "LoveGame" and "Poker Face". She appears with Madonna in Deep House Dish, and in another sketch after her second performance.; Elijah Wood appears in the SNL Digital Short.; Scarlett Johansson (Reynolds' then-wife) appears in the "Porcelain Fountains" ad portraying the same Lexi character she played during her two hosting appearances.; Darrell Hammond appears as California Governor Arnold Schwarzenegger during Weekend Update.
661	3	Drew Barrymore	Regina Spektor	October 10, 2009	4.6/11
Regina Spektor performs "Eet" and "The Calculation".; Justin Long (Barrymore's then-partner) appears as Matthew McConaughey in a sketch called "Celebrity Ghost Stories". He summarized the plot of McConaughey's movie, Ghosts of Girlfriends Past.
662	4	Gerard Butler	Shakira	October 17, 2009	4.8/11
Shakira performs "She Wolf" and "Did It Again".; Dwayne Johnson made a cameo reprising his role as "The Rock" Obama in the cold opening.; For the original airing, in lieu of the typical advertisements, outtakes from dress rehearsals from the 1990s and 2000s were shown, as Anheuser-Busch had bought the entire adspace run to promote their limited-run beer Bud Light Golden Wheat.; James Franco appears as himself in the sketch "What Up with That?".; Saoirse Ronan appears in the audience during the "What Up with That?" sketch.
663	5	Taylor Swift	Taylor Swift	November 7, 2009	5.0/12
Taylor Swift performs "You Belong with Me", "Untouchable" and, during the monologue, her "Monologue Song."; Amy Poehler returned to do another "Really?! with Seth and Amy" during Weekend Update. Poehler also introduced Swift's second performance.
664	6	January Jones	Black Eyed Peas	November 14, 2009	4.7/12
Black Eyed Peas performs "I Gotta Feeling", "Meet Me Halfway" and "Boom Boom Pow". The last song closed out the show and was played over the goodnights. They also appear in the Today Show sketch.; Darrell Hammond cameoed as Lou Dobbs on Weekend Update.
665	7	Joseph Gordon-Levitt	Dave Matthews Band	November 21, 2009	4.3/11
Dave Matthews Band performs "You and Me" and "Shake Me Like a Monkey".; Joseph Gordon-Levitt's opening monologue is a song and dance tribute to Donald O'Connor's "Make 'Em Laugh" number in Singin' in the Rain.; Dave Matthews cameoed as Ozzy Osbourne in "The Mellow Show with Jack Johnson", while Bill Hader portrayed Matthews.; Al Gore cameoed in the "What Up with That?" sketch and on Weekend Update, promoting NBC "Green Week" and his new book.; Mindy Kaling cameoed in "What Up with That?" as the second guest.
666	8	Blake Lively	Rihanna	December 5, 2009	4.4/12
Rihanna performs "Russian Roulette" and "Hard" and appears in the SNL Digital Short.; Young Jeezy performs with Rihanna for her second song.; On this episode's installment of Weekend Update, Abby Elliott appears as actress-singer Brittany Murphy, following a report about Murphy's alleged firing from a recent film. This portion of Update was cut from reruns in light of Murphy's death later that month.
667	9	Taylor Lautner	Bon Jovi	December 12, 2009	5.1/12
Bon Jovi performs "Superman Tonight" and "When We Were Beautiful".; A memoriam picture of Heino Ripp, the original technical director, was shown before the goodnights.
668	10	James Franco	Muse	December 19, 2009	4.4/11
Muse performs "Uprising" and "Starlight".; Mike Tyson and Jack McBrayer appear during "What Up with That?".
669	11	Charles Barkley	Alicia Keys	January 9, 2010	4.4/19
Alicia Keys performs "Try Sleeping with a Broken Heart" and "Empire State of Mind (Part II) Broken Down" and appears in the SNL Digital Short.; SNL writers Hannibal Buress, Jessi Klein, and John Lutz appear in the opening monologue.; The original east coast airing was delayed 35 minutes due to the Cowboys-Eagles NFC Wild Card game's running long. Barkley acknowledges this delay in his monologue.; This episode attracted 10.4 million viewers, and was the second highest-rated episode of the season.
670	12	Sigourney Weaver	The Ting Tings	January 16, 2010	5.4/14
The Ting Tings performs "That's Not My Name" and "Shut Up and Let Me Go".; Darrell Hammond cameoed as Jay Leno in the cold open.; James Cameron cameoed as himself in the SNL Digital Short.; Future SNL cast member Colin Jost and writer John Mulaney appear in the SNL Digital Short.
671	13	Jon Hamm	Michael Bublé	January 30, 2010	5.0/12
Michael Bublé performs "Haven't Met You Yet" and "Baby (You've Got What It Takes)" and appears in the "Hamm and Bublé" sketch.; Sharon Jones sang with Michael Bublé for his second song.
672	14	Ashton Kutcher	Them Crooked Vultures	February 6, 2010	5.3/13
Them Crooked Vultures performs "Mind Eraser, No Chaser" and "New Fang". As well, Dave Grohl appears in a sketch after Them Crooked Vultures' second performance.
673	15	Jennifer Lopez	Jennifer Lopez	February 27, 2010	6.3/15
Jennifer Lopez performs "Until It Beats No More" and "Starting Over".
674	16	Zach Galifianakis	Vampire Weekend	March 6, 2010	5.0/12
Vampire Weekend performs "Cousins" and "Giving Up the Gun".; Brian Williams, Jack McBrayer, Jane Krakowski, Mehmet Oz, Anthony Anderson, and Jeremy Sisto all appear during the SNL Digital Short, "Zach Drops by the Set".; Paul Rudd and Frank Rich appear during "What Up with That?".; Galifianakis shaved his beard before the last sketch of the show and wears a fake beard during the goodnights.
675	17	Jude Law	Pearl Jam	March 13, 2010	4.5/11
Pearl Jam performs "Just Breathe" and "Unthought Known" and appears in the "Twilight Zone" Nightmare at 20,000 Feet parody.; Julian Casablancas sang "Boombox" with The Lonely Island in the SNL Digital Short.; Jerry Seinfeld cameoed on Weekend Update to do "Really?! With Seth and Jerry".
676	18	Tina Fey	Justin Bieber	April 10, 2010	5.7/14
Justin Bieber performs "Baby" and "U Smile" and appears in two sketches. Bieber also appears in Fey's monologue.; Mark Sanchez and Steve Martin made cameo appearances during Fey's monologue.; Fey reprises her impersonation of Sarah Palin on the fake commercial "The Sarah Palin Network".; Fey received a 2010 Emmy Award nomination as herself for Guest Actress in a Comedy.
677	19	Ryan Phillippe	Kesha	April 17, 2010	5.2/13
Kesha performs "Tik Tok" and "Your Love Is My Drug".; Phillippe promoted the film MacGruber, the first new SNL movie in over a decade.
678	20	Gabourey Sidibe	MGMT	April 24, 2010	4.7/12
MGMT performs "Flash Delirium" and "Brian Eno".; SNL writer John Mulaney delivers a Weekend Update commentary on girl scout cookies. Stefon also makes his Update debut, written by Mulaney and Bill Hader.
679	21	Betty White	Jay-Z	May 8, 2010	8.8/21
In early 2010, an online campaign was created on Facebook to get White to host an episode of the show. The group was called Betty White to Host SNL (please?)! The movement was sparked by White's appearance in a Snickers commercial aired during Super Bowl XLIV. Because of this, White is the first person to ever host based on an internet movement created by fans. The commercial itself aired during one of the commercial breaks.; With this episode, White, at age 88, is the oldest person ever to host the show, surpassing Miskel Spillman, the winner of SNL's "Anyone Can Host" contest in 1977.; For the first set, Jay-Z performs a medley of "Public Service Announcement", "On to the Next One", "99 Problems", "'03 Bonnie & Clyde", and "Empire State of Mind," featuring back-up singer Bridget Kelly. During "99 Problems", Jay-Z's band samples "Points of Authority" by Linkin Park. For the second set, Jay-Z performs "Young Forever" with Mr Hudson, which he dedicated to White.; Former SNL cast members Rachel Dratch, Tina Fey, Ana Gasteyer, Amy Poehler, Maya Rudolph and Molly Shannon appear throughout the show. Gasteyer and Shannon reprised their characters from The Delicious Dish sketches. Shannon also reprised her character Sally O'Malley during Weekend Update. Rudolph reprised her impression of Whitney Houston during Weekend Update. Fey and Poehler returned to Update as well, to participate in Really!?!.; During the goodnights, Kristen Wiig and Kenan Thompson presented two flower bouquets to White.; This episode was nominated for seven 2010 Emmy Awards.; White won an Emmy for Guest Actress in a Comedy for hosting.; This episode was re-aired on January 1, 2022 as a tribute to White, as she had died the previous day on December 31, 2021.; TV Ratings: 14.952 million viewers
680	22	Alec Baldwin	Tom Petty and the Heartbreakers	May 15, 2010	5.8/14
Tom Petty and the Heartbreakers performs "I Should Have Known It" and "Jefferson Jericho Blues". Additionally, Petty appears in the SNL Digital Short.; Steve Martin made a filmed cameo appearance in the opening monologue.; Will Forte and Jenny Slate's final episode as cast members.

== Specials ==
Title	Original release date
"Saturday Night Live Presents: A Very Gilly Christmas"	December 17, 2009
Holiday-themed sketches from past episodes are aired, including Adam Sandler's "The Hanukkah Song", Justin Timberlake and Andy Samberg's "Dick In A Box" Digital Short, Delicious Dish and many more. Alec Baldwin and Steve Martin make guest appearances. Kristen Wiig hosts as her character Gilly, with Will Forte, Kenan Thompson, Bobby Moynihan and Abby Elliott reprising their roles as the sketch's supporting characters.
"Saturday Night Live Presents: Sports All-Stars"	January 31, 2010
Will Forte and Jason Sudeikis host the show as Pete Twinkle and Greg Stink, their recurring ESPN Classic sports announcer characters. Sketches featuring appearances by professional athletes including: Peyton Manning, Derek Jeter, LeBron James, Michael Jordan, Tom Brady, Charles Barkley and others are shown (most of which previously appeared in last year's SNL clip show special about sports-related sketches).
"Saturday Night Live in the 2000s: Time and Again"	April 15, 2010
The special featured insight on the show during the 2000s: topics discussed include Jimmy Fallon and Tina Fey as the new Weekend Update anchors after the departure of Colin Quinn, how SNL became popular for its spoofs on the 2000 United States presidential election, how the show's humor survived the 9/11 attacks and the anthrax scare, Will Ferrell's departure at the end of season 27 and the search for a replacement cast member to play George W. Bush, SNL's shaky years between seasons 28 and 30 due to Jimmy Fallon's and Horatio Sanz's cracking up on camera, Jimmy Fallon's departure from the show, Amy Poehler teaming up with Tina Fey for Weekend Update, the hiring of Bill Hader, Andy Samberg, and Kristen Wiig, and SNL regaining its popularity with the Digital Shorts, its return from the WGA strike of 2007–2008, the introduction of new fan-favorite hosts like Justin Timberlake and Jon Hamm, and the 2008 U.S. Presidential Election. Fred Armisen, Alec Baldwin, Rachel Dratch, Abby Elliott, Jimmy Fallon, Will Ferrell, Tina Fey, Will Forte, Bill Hader, Darrell Hammond, Chris Kattan, Marci Klein, John McCain, Seth Meyers, Lorne Michaels, Tracy Morgan, Bobby Moynihan, Chris Parnell, Amy Poehler, Maya Rudolph, Andy Samberg, Horatio Sanz, Akiva Schaffer, Molly Shannon, Michael Shoemaker, Jason Sudeikis, Jorma Taccone, Kenan Thompson, Justin Timberlake, Christopher Walken and Kristen Wiig gave insight in the special.

=== Saturday Night Live Weekend Update Thursday ===
The second season of Saturday Night Live Weekend Update Thursday, a limited-run series based on Saturday Night Live's "Weekend Update" sketch, aired in conjunction with this season. The show is hosted by Seth Meyers, Update's current host, and former Update co-host Amy Poehler. Like the sketch, the show is a parody of local news broadcasts and satirizes contemporary news stories and figures. As of June 2010, three episodes have aired. An additional three episodes were scheduled to air in spring 2010, but were scrapped.

Episode number	Original airdate	Notes
Episode 1	September 17, 2009	Amy Poehler appears as a special guest to co-anchor Update alongside Seth Meyers.; Darrell Hammond appears as former president Jimmy Carter.
Episode 2	September 24, 2009	Amy Poehler returns as a special guest to co-anchor Update alongside Seth Meyers.; Former Saturday Night Live cast member Darrell Hammond appears as Bill Clinton and Megan Fox parodies the finale of the soap opera Guiding Light.; Newly hired Saturday Night Live featured player Nasim Pedrad appears for the first time in the cold open as Kathy Griffin.
Episode 3	October 1, 2009	Darrell Hammond appears as Dennis Franz and Maya Rudolph appears as Oprah Winfrey.; This is the first Weekend Update Thursday episode not to feature a cold open.

== MacGruber film ==
The first SNL film since 2000's The Ladies Man, MacGruber was released on May 21, 2010. The film, starring SNL cast members Will Forte and Kristen Wiig and former cast member Maya Rudolph, is based on the "MacGruber" sketches from the show. It received mixed reviews from critics and, in spite of a wide initial release, was a box office bomb. After a two-week opening commitment during which it was shown in 2,546 theaters, it was dropped from all but 177 theaters starting in its third week.
