= Saturday Night Live season 34 =

Saturday Night Live
- Season 34
- No. of episodes: 22

Release
- Original network: NBC
- Original release: September 13, 2008 – May 16, 2009

Season chronology
- ← Previous season 33 Next → season 35

The thirty-fourth season of Saturday Night Live, an American sketch comedy series, originally aired in the United States on NBC between September 13, 2008, and May 16, 2009.

This season is notable for its take on the 2008 presidential election, which saw the show's ratings rapidly increase and multiple award wins.

== Presidential election coverage ==
SNL's coverage of the 2008 presidential election caused ratings to increase rapidly. The season premiere opened with Tina Fey playing Republican vice-presidential nominee Sarah Palin (alongside a pregnant Amy Poehler as Hillary Clinton) in a "non-partisan message on sexism". The phrase "I can see Russia from my house!" was coined by SNL producer Mike Shoemaker during this sketch.

== Accolades ==
The show won a Peabody Award for its political satire in 2009. Tina Fey won a Primetime Emmy Award for Outstanding Guest Actress in a Comedy Series for her portrayal of Sarah Palin. The show also won a Writers Guild of America Award for Comedy/Variety Talk Series.

== Cast ==
The entire cast of the previous year returned for season 34. Added to the cast was Upright Citizens Brigade Theater performer Bobby Moynihan.

Longtime cast member Amy Poehler went on maternity leave during the season, after giving birth to her son hours before the October 25, 2008 episode hosted by Jon Hamm. Shortly after Poehler's leave, the show added two new female cast members: Abby Elliott, daughter of former SNL cast member Chris Elliott, and Michaela Watkins of The Groundlings both joined the show as featured players on November 15, 2008. Poehler, who had been with the show for 7½ seasons since 2001, returned for the December 6 episode hosted by John Malkovich, and made her final appearance as a cast member the following week on the December 13 show hosted by Hugh Laurie. Poehler announced it would be her final show at the end of Weekend Update, leaving Seth Meyers to anchor Weekend Update on his own from the remainder of this season, until the end of Season 38. At the time of her departure, Poehler's eight-season run was SNL's longest for a female cast member, having surpassed Molly Shannon and Rachel Dratch.

It would also be the final season for longtime cast member Darrell Hammond, who was the last remaining cast member to have joined in the 1990s. Hammond had been on the show for 14 seasons since 1995 and was holding the distinction of the longest tenured cast member until fellow Season 34 member Kenan Thompson surpassed him in 2017. Hammond would go on to make multiple cameo appearances in later episodes and take over as announcer for Don Pardo, who died in 2014 before the start of Season 40. Following Hammond's departure, featured players Watkins and Casey Wilson were both let go following the end of the season.

=== Cast roster ===
**Repertory players**

- Fred Armisen
- Will Forte
- Bill Hader
- Darrell Hammond
- **Seth Meyers**
- **Amy Poehler** (final episode: December 13, 2008)
- Andy Samberg
- Jason Sudeikis
- Kenan Thompson
- Kristen Wiig

**Featured players**

- Abby Elliott (first episode: November 15, 2008)
- Bobby Moynihan
- Michaela Watkins (first episode: November 15, 2008)
- Casey Wilson

bold denotes Weekend Update anchor

== Writers ==
Seth Meyers became the sole head writer for the season.

Paula Pell, who had been co-head writer for the previous two seasons, returned to her previous role as writing supervisor. Pell had been a writer for the show since 1995.

The other former co-head writer, Harper Steele left the show prior to the start of the season. Steele was a writer for 13 seasons, holding the position of head writer for the previous four.

Additionally, John Mulaney was hired as a writer for this season.

== Episodes ==
No. overall	No. in season	Host	Musical guest(s)	Original release date	Ratings/ Share
637	1	Michael Phelps	Lil Wayne	September 13, 2008	7.4/18
Lil Wayne performs "Got Money" and "Lollipop".; Tina Fey appears as Sarah Palin and Amy Poehler appears as Hillary Clinton in A Nonpartisan Message from Governor Sarah Palin & Senator Hillary Clinton in the cold open.; William Shatner and Michael Phelps' mother Debbie make cameo appearances in the opening monologue. Guy Fieri was sitting next to Shatner in the audience, but wasn’t a part of the show.; Jared Fogle cameos in "The Michael Phelps Diet" sketch.; At the end of the episode, before the goodnights, a dedication screen was put up for producer/agent Bernie Brillstein, who had died a month before this episode aired. Brillstein helped in getting Saturday Night Live picked up as a TV series.; Senator Barack Obama was scheduled to make a second cameo appearance in this episode. However, Obama canceled his appearance due to the results of Hurricane Ike.; Bobby Moynihan's first episode as a cast member.
638	2	James Franco	Kings of Leon	September 20, 2008	8.5/18
Kings of Leon perform "Sex on Fire" and "Use Somebody".; Cameron Diaz makes a guest appearance, reprising her role as Kiki Deamore in the recurring sketch "The Cougar Den".; Blake Lively makes a cameo appearance in the SNL Digital Short.; Kumail Nanjiani appears briefly during the "New York Times" sketch.
639	3	Anna Faris	Duffy	September 27, 2008	6.0/15
Duffy performs "Mercy" and "Stepping Stone".; Tina Fey returned as Governor Sarah Palin in the cold open, being interviewed by Katie Couric, played by Amy Poehler.; Chris Parnell makes a guest appearance in a debate sketch as Jim Lehrer.
640	4	Anne Hathaway	The Killers	October 4, 2008	7.4/18
The Killers performed "Human" and "Spaceman".; Queen Latifah appeared as Gwen Ifill and Tina Fey returned as Sarah Palin in a parody of the Vice Presidential Debate, with Jason Sudeikis as Joe Biden in the cold open.; An edited version of the sketch parodying the economic bailout was posted on NBC.com, removing references to Herbert and Marion Sandler's (played by Darrell Hammond and Casey Wilson, respectively) corrupt activities and removing the graphic labeling the couple as "people who should be shot." Lorne Michaels admitted he did not know the Sandlers were a real couple; he believed they were simply characters written for the sketch. The Netflix version (and versions of this sketch shown on Hulu and Saturday Night Live's mobile app) of this episode includes the scene with the Sandlers, but edited it to remove the "People Who Should Be Shot" lower-third and cut the part where Herbert Sandler thanks Barney Frank for letting them get away with what they did to Wachovia Bank.; Andy Samberg plays Mark Wahlberg in a sketch where Wahlberg talks to animals, which is referenced by Wahlberg in the following episode.
641	5	Josh Brolin	Adele	October 18, 2008	10.7/24
Adele performs "Chasing Pavements" and "Cold Shoulder".; Tina Fey returned again as Sarah Palin, and was joined by Mark Wahlberg, Alec Baldwin and the real Sarah Palin making guest appearances in the cold opening. Wahlberg also appeared in a brief sketch making amends with Andy Samberg, referring to a sketch from the previous episode. Sarah Palin also appeared on "Weekend Update".; Oliver Stone makes a cameo in the opening monologue while Brolin impersonates George W. Bush.; The New York Underground short film was directed by Noah Baumbach.
642	6	Jon Hamm	Coldplay	October 25, 2008	7.1/18
Coldplay performs "Viva La Vida", "Lost!", "Yellow", and "Lovers in Japan", which was cut off.; Co-stars Elisabeth Moss and John Slattery appeared in the "Ad Agency" sketch as their Mad Men characters Peggy Olson and Roger Sterling, respectively.; Amy Poehler did not appear, having given birth hours before this episode aired; Seth Meyers anchored Update by himself, announcing at the beginning of the segment "Amy Poehler is not here tonight, because she's having a baby" to tremendous applause, then continuing with "tonight's other top stories."; Maya Rudolph appears as Michelle Obama in the Obama Variety Hour sketch, and performs a brief cover of "Can't Take My Eyes Off You", replacing "I love you, baby" with "we love you, Amy", with Kenan Thompson at the end of Update, wishing Poehler the best during her maternity leave.
643	7	Ben Affleck	David Cook	November 1, 2008	9.0/20
David Cook performs "Light On" and "Declaration".; John and Cindy McCain appear as themselves and Tina Fey makes an appearance as Sarah Palin in the cold opening. The episode aired only three days before the 2008 presidential election. McCain also appeared in "Weekend Update".; Seth Meyers anchors "Weekend Update" by himself.; This episode marks the first appearance of Bill Hader's Stefon character, though he wouldn't be a Weekend Update character until next season's episode hosted by Gabourey Sidibe. Also, Kenan Thompson debuts his Grady Wilson character.
644	8	Paul Rudd	Beyoncé	November 15, 2008	6.8/21
Beyoncé performs "If I Were a Boy" and "Single Ladies", and appears in a sketch about a music video of the latter.; Justin Timberlake makes a cameo during Weekend Update and in the "Single Ladies" sketch as one of the three backup dancers.; Abby Elliott and Michaela Watkins' first episode as cast members.
645	9	Tim McGraw	Ludacris & T-Pain	November 22, 2008	5.9/16
Ludacris and T-Pain perform "One More Drink" and "Chopped & Skrewed". Both Ludacris and T-Pain appear in the "Blizzard Man Replaces T-Pain" sketch.; Justin Timberlake was originally scheduled to be the host and musical guest for this episode, but he had to cancel at the last minute, as he explained in the previous episode.
646	10	John Malkovich	T.I.	December 6, 2008	7.3/20
T.I. performs "Whatever You Like" and "Swing Ya Rag" with Swizz Beatz.; Amy Poehler returns as Hillary Clinton in the cold opening and co-anchored "Weekend Update" with Seth Meyers after four weeks of being absent due to the birth of her son, Archie.; Jamie-Lynn Sigler, Molly Sims, and Justin Timberlake appear in the "Jizz in My Pants" digital short along with Jorma Taccone, Akiva Schaffer, and Andy Samberg.; During the production of this episode, James Franco was around the SNL set throughout the entire week, shooting a documentary feature. Franco wanted initially some footage for a class project of his, but after realizing just how much access he was granted to the set, he decided to make a full documentary on the entire process the cast and crew go through in order to prepare for an SNL episode.
647	11	Hugh Laurie	Kanye West	December 13, 2008	7.4/22
Kanye West performed "Love Lockdown" and a medley including "Heartless" and "Pinocchio Story".; Maya Rudolph performs in a "Bronx Beat" sketch with Amy Poehler.; Amy Poehler's final episode as a cast member; she announces her departure at the end of Weekend Update, being interrupted at one point by Fred Armisen as New York governor David Paterson walking in front of the camera, having left shortly before; as Meyers and Poehler sign off Update, they share a long hug as the segment ends.; Shortly after this broadcast, Paterson himself openly complained about Armisen's portrayal of him, saying the impression was insensitive to the blind and visually impaired (Paterson would later appear with Armisen on the premiere episode of season 36)
648	12	Neil Patrick Harris	Taylor Swift	January 10, 2009	9.5/24
Taylor Swift appears in the "Save Broadway" sketch as Annie, and performs "Love Story" and "Forever & Always".; Liza Minnelli appears in the "Group Therapy" sketch.; Harris reprises his RENT character of Mark Cohen on "Save Broadway" sketch, which he played during the Los Angeles production in 1997. In the same sketch Fred Armisen, a former drummer for the Blue Man Group, plays the center blue man.
649	13	Rosario Dawson	Fleet Foxes	January 17, 2009	6.6/16
Fleet Foxes performs "Mykonos" and "Blue Ridge Mountains".
650	14	Steve Martin	Jason Mraz	January 31, 2009	6.4/15
Jason Mraz performs "I'm Yours" and "Lucky" with Colbie Caillat.; Steve Martin (15th time as host) performed "Late for School" on his banjo from his new album "The Crow: New Songs for the 5-String Banjo" with Michael Daves, Craig Eastman, Brittany Haas, and Skip Ward. This marked the first time since 1978 that Martin had performed music on the SNL stage.; During the original broadcast Richard Dean Anderson, who played MacGyver on the TV series, reprised his role in three MacGruber Pepsi ads as a helper to MacGruber.; This episode marks the last time Martin would host SNL until Season 48, though he would continue to make cameos and served as de facto host for SNL's 40th Anniversary Special in 2015.
651	15	Bradley Cooper	TV on the Radio	February 7, 2009	5.8/12
TV on the Radio performs "Golden Age" and "Dancing Choose".; James Lipton makes a cameo during the monologue.; The Lonely Island and T-Pain premiered "I'm on a Boat" from the Lonely Island's Incredibad album in the SNL Digital Short.; Drew Barrymore appears during the closing credits.
652	16	Alec Baldwin	Jonas Brothers	February 14, 2009	7.1/19
The Jonas Brothers perform "Tonight" and "Video Girl". They also appear in a sketch and an SNL Digital Short.; Former castmember Dan Aykroyd appears as John Boehner in the cold opening.; Baldwin’s 30 Rock co-star Jack McBrayer makes a guest appearance in the opening monologue.; Cameron Diaz once again reprises her role as Kiki Deamore in the recurring sketch "The Cougar Den".; Alec Baldwin's nieces Alaia and Hailey make a cameo introducing the Jonas Brothers' second song.
653	17	Dwayne Johnson	Ray LaMontagne	March 7, 2009	6.8/17
Ray LaMontagne performs "You Are the Best Thing" and "Trouble".; Richard Dean Anderson returned as MacGyver for three more MacGruber shorts.; Justin Timberlake and his wife Jessica Biel appeared as Irving Hillman and Jessica Rabbit, respectively, in "Weekend Update".; Writer John Mulaney makes an appearance in the “Activia Commercial” sketch.
654	18	Tracy Morgan	Kelly Clarkson	March 14, 2009	7.6/21
Kelly Clarkson performs "My Life Would Suck Without You" and "I Do Not Hook Up".; Morgan’s 30 Rock co-star Tina Fey, John Cena, Emily Spivey, and Simon Rich appear in the cold open.; Tracy Morgan reprises his roles as Brian Fellow in Brian Fellow's Safari Planet and as Astronaut Jones.; Writers James Anderson, Colin Jost, John Mulaney, John Lutz, and Bryan Tucker appear in the SNL Digital Short.
655	19	Seth Rogen	Phoenix	April 4, 2009	5.5/12
Phoenix performs "Lisztomania," "1901" and "Too Young", which was cut off.; Seth Rogen reprises his impression of Rowlf the Dog from his first appearance on SNL.; Rogen appears in the SNL Digital Short for the music video of The Lonely Island's "Like a Boss". Rogen replaced Akiva Schaffer's vocals; however, Akiva Schaffer did make an appearance as the gun dealer. Fellow Lonely Island member Jorma Taccone also makes an appearance in the video delivering a harassment lawsuit to Andy Samberg.
656	20	Zac Efron	Yeah Yeah Yeahs	April 11, 2009	5.1
Yeah Yeah Yeahs perform "Zero" and "Maps".
657	21	Justin Timberlake	Ciara	May 9, 2009	6.0
Ciara performs "Love Sex Magic" with Justin Timberlake and "Never Ever".; Timberlake’s wife Jessica Biel introduces "Love Sex Magic".; Susan Sarandon and Patricia Clarkson made guest appearances during the Digital Short.; Chris Pine, Zachary Quinto and Leonard Nimoy cameoed on Weekend Update in a commentary on the theatrical release of Star Trek.; Jimmy Fallon reprised his role as Barry Gibb for another installment of "The Barry Gibb Talk Show".; Justin Timberlake (third time as host) won an Emmy for hosting this episode.
658	22	Will Ferrell	Green Day	May 16, 2009	5.7
Green Day performs "Know Your Enemy", "21 Guns" and, in a cut performance, "East Jesus Nowhere", during which Will Ferrell played cowbell. The band also appears in "Goodnight Saigon".; Tom Hanks plays himself in "Celebrity Jeopardy!", and in "Goodnight Saigon".; Norm Macdonald appears in "Celebrity Jeopardy!" as Burt Reynolds, and in "Goodnight Saigon".; Amy Poehler returned to co-anchor Weekend Update, and she accompanied Will Ferrell on a triangle for "Goodnight Saigon".; Maya Rudolph reprised her character Glenda Goodwin in the funeral sketch and sang with Will Ferrell for "Goodnight Saigon".; Paul Rudd, Artie Lange, Elisabeth Moss, and Anne Hathaway also appear in "Goodnight Saigon".; Will Ferrell reprised his impersonations of George W. Bush, Alex Trebek, and Harry Caray.; Darrell Hammond, Michaela Watkins and Casey Wilson's final episode as cast members.; This episode premiered the same night as the series finale of its rival sketch show MADtv, which also featured Artie Lange.

== Specials ==
Title	Original release date	US viewers (millions)
"Saturday Night Live Presidential Bash 2008"	November 3, 2008	N/A
A selection of sketches relating to the 2008 election.
