= Vanessa Bayer =

American actress and comedian (born 1981)

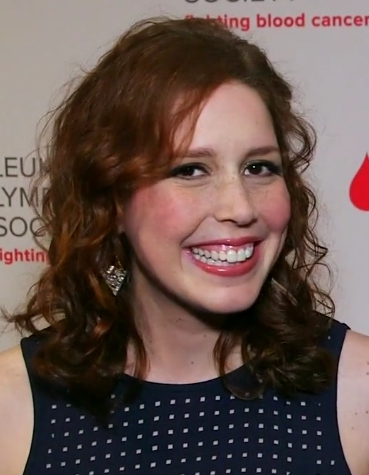
- Bayer at the Leukemia & Lymphoma Society in 2015
- Born: November 14, 1981 (age 44); Orange, Ohio, U.S.
- Education: University of Pennsylvania (BA)
- Occupations: Actress; comedian
- Years active: 2002–present

Vanessa Bayer (born November 14, 1981) is an American actress and comedian. She was a cast member on the NBC sketch comedy series Saturday Night Live from 2010 to 2017, for which she was nominated for an Emmy. She co-created, co-executive produced, and starred in the Showtime comedy I Love That for You, loosely based on her experience as a survivor of childhood leukemia. She has appeared in such films as Trainwreck (2015), Office Christmas Party (2016), Carrie Pilby (2016), Ibiza (2018), and Wander Darkly (2020).

== Early life and education ==
Bayer was born on November 14, 1981, in Orange, Ohio, a suburb of Cleveland, and raised in nearby Moreland Hills. She is the daughter of Carolyn and Todd Bayer. Bayer's family is Jewish, and she has stated that her Jewish upbringing "influenced her life and comedy". She has an older brother, Jonah, who is a music journalist and plays guitar with the rock group United Nations.

At age 15, Bayer was diagnosed with acute lymphoblastic leukemia (ALL). She stated how while battling the disease, she discovered the meaning of comic relief. "I don't know if it made me funnier, but it was so amazing, how it made everything be O.K.", she said.

Bayer is a 2000 graduate of Orange High School. In 2004, she graduated from the Annenberg School for Communication of the University of Pennsylvania, where she majored in communications and French.

While attending college, she interned on the television shows Sesame Street and Late Night with Conan O'Brien and participated in the cast of Bloomers, an all-female musical and sketch comedy troupe.

== Career ==
As of 2012, Bayer was collaborating with her brother Jonah on the web series Sound Advice for Above Average, where she stars as Janessa Slater, a media coach who helps famous musicians change their images. She was part of the all-Jewish cast of The Second City's stage show Jewsical: The Musical, a musical that presented a comedic take on Jewish life and culture. She played Kate Clark in the Chicago-based feature comedy Off the Cuff. She performed improvisational comedy at Chicago's ImprovOlympic, where she trained with SNL castmate Paul Brittain, and at the Annoyance Theatre and The Second City.

=== Saturday Night Live ===
Bayer joined the cast of Saturday Night Live as a featured player on September 25, 2010. She was promoted to repertory status for the 2012–2013 seasons. In 2014, she was nominated for an American Comedy Award for her work on the show, and in 2017, was nominated for a Primetime Emmy Award for Outstanding Supporting Actress in a Comedy Series. She departed SNL on May 20, 2017, after seven years.

Her recurring characters included:

- Laura Parsons, a child actress always performing roles originally played by adults, including from Forrest Gump, The Wolf of Wall Street, Brokeback Mountain and Dallas Buyers Club
- Brecky, a former porn star who creates homemade commercials to obtain free luxury items (with Cecily Strong)
- Rebecca Stern-Markowicz, a co-host of J-Pop America Fun Time Now, which celebrates Japanese culture, (with Taran Killam and Jason Sudeikis)
- Rosa, a housemaid, in "The Californians"
- Miss Meadows, an unrealistically perky poetry teacher trying to connect with her delinquent students
- An unnamed director of talk show Mornin' Miami
- Jacob the Bar Mitzvah Boy, who appears on Weekend Update to perform a rehearsed speech with forced jokes about a given subject
- One of three workshop elves who perform their jobs poorly in the hope that their master will "punish" them (with Kenan Thompson)
- Dawn Lazarus, an inept meteorologist who appears on Weekend Update and struggles to discuss the weather
- A housewife who cooks for her husband and his friends in a series of increasingly absurd Totino's commercials
- One of two Weekend Update guests who claim to be "best friends" with various world dictators, and gossip about petty drama in their social circle (with Fred Armisen)

=== Celebrity impressions ===
- Amelia Earhart
- Dianna Agron
- Diane Keaton
- Elisabeth Hasselbeck
- Hillary Clinton
- Ivanka Trump
- Jennifer Aniston
- Jacqueline Bisset
- Keri Russell
- Kourtney Kardashian
- Lady Gaga
- Margaret Thatcher
- Mary-Louise Parker
- Michelle Friedland
- Miley Cyrus
- Molly Ringwald
- Rachel Dolezal
- Sara Gilbert
- Susan Lucci
- Zosia Mamet

=== Post-SNL career ===
Bayer appeared on ABC's Single Parents in 2019 in a recurring role as Mia Cooper, the ex-wife of Taran Killam's character.

Starting in 2018, she had a recurring role on NBC's Will & Grace as Amy, a former baker who loses her job because of Karen and subsequently works for Karen's baseball team.

Bayer is the co-creator, co-executive producer and star of the Showtime comedy I Love That for You, which premiered on May 1, 2022, and is loosely based on her life as a survivor of childhood leukemia.

Bayer appeared in two episodes of What We Do in the Shadows as Evie Russell, a vampire who drains energy from humans by resorting to passive aggressive and wholly fabricated stories of various horrible things that supposedly happened to her. She has a rivalry with energy Vampire Colin Robinson, played by Mark Proksch, who uses boring long-winded explanations to get the same result. Bayer played Madame Jen in the 2025 fantasy comedy Freakier Friday. In 2026, she appears in the tenth season of Scrubs in the recurring role of Sibby Wilson.

== Philanthropy ==
After Bayer was diagnosed with leukemia as a teenager, the Make-A-Wish Foundation granted her wish to send her family on vacation to Hawaii. In gratitude and recognition, Bayer is involved with the foundation. In 2015, she hosted its Evening of Wishes Dinner to help raise funds for wishes for children with life-threatening illnesses.

In June 2019, Bayer published the children's book How Do You Care for a Very Sick Bear?, which teaches children how to support friends with long-term illnesses.

== Filmography ==
=== Film ===
Vanessa Bayer film appearances
Year	Title	Role	Notes
2009	Off the Cuff	Kate Clark	
2010	Stages of Emily	Jocelyn	Short film
2012	Adventures in the Sin Bin	Superdawg Waitress	
2013	Despicable Me 2	Flight Attendant (voice)	Cameo
2015	Trainwreck	Nikki	
2016	Carrie Pilby	Tara	
2016	Office Christmas Party	Allison Parker	
2017	The Polka King	Bitsy Bear	
2018	Ibiza	Nikki	
2020	Wander Darkly	Maggie	
2021	Barb and Star Go to Vista Del Mar	Debbie	
2022	DC League of Super-Pets	PB (voice)	
2025	Freakier Friday	Madame Jen	
2025	Maddie's Secret	Julie	
2026	Hoppers	Diane (voice)	
2027	The Comeback King		Filming

=== Television ===
Vanessa Bayer television appearances
Year	Title	Role	Notes
2010–2017	Saturday Night Live	Various	Series regular Nominated – 2014 American Comedy Award for Comedy Supporting Actress – TV; Nominated – 2014 Online Film & Television Association Award for Best Female Performance in a Fiction Program; Nominated – 2015 Online Film & Television Association Award for Best Female Performance in a Fiction Program; Nominated – Primetime Emmy Award for Outstanding Supporting Actress in a Comedy Series
2011	I Wanna Have Your Baby	Connie	Episode: "Corrine & Jerry"
2012	Sugarboy	Chip's wife	
2013	The Mindy Project	Mary	Episode: "Sk8er Man"
2014	Comedy Bang! Bang!	Susan Armhold	Episode: "Patton Oswalt Wears a Black Blazer & Dress Shoes"
2014	Wallykazam!	Rockelle (voice)	Episode: "The Rock Can Talk"
2014	TripTank	Various (voice)	2 episodes
2014–2017	Portlandia	Various	4 episodes
2015	Man Seeking Woman	Laura	2 episodes
2015	The Awesomes	Dr. Jill Stein-Awesome-Kaplan (voice)	4 episodes
2016	Modern Family	Marjorie	Episode: "Snow Ball"
2016–2019	Drunk History	Various	3 episodes
2017	The Simpsons	Dr. Clarity Hoffman-Roth (voice)	Episode: "A Father's Watch"
2017	Crashing	Herself	Episode: "Julie"
2018	Love	Sarah	Episode: "Sarah from College"
2018–2020	Will & Grace	Amy / Friday	6 episodes
2019–2020	Single Parents	Mia	3 episodes
2019–2023	What We Do in the Shadows	Evie Russell	2 episodes
2019	I Think You Should Leave with Tim Robinson	Brenda	Episode: "Instagram"
2019	Trolls: The Beat Goes On!	Baha (voice)	Episode: "Finn Cascade"
2019	Helpsters	Rita Reader	Episode: "Rita Reader/Cody Gets a Cold"
2020	Shrill	Justine	Episode: "WAHAM"
2020	Brooklyn Nine-Nine	Officer Debbie Fogle	Recurring role (season 7); 3 episodes
2022–2024	Alice's Wonderland Bakery	Tweedle Do (voice)	Recurring role
2022	I Love That for You	Joanna Gold	Series regular; also creator and executive producer
2022	Barry	Morgan Dawn-Cherry	Episode: "710N"
2024	City Island	Ms. Webster (voice)	Episode: "The Internet"
2024	Elsbeth	DeeDee Dashers	Episode: "Gold, Frankincense, and Murder"
2024	No Good Deed	Cynthia	Episode: "Open House"
2025–present	Iron Man and His Awesome Friends	Swarm (voice)	Recurring role
2025	Mid-Century Modern	Liz	Episode: "Working Girls"
2026–present	Scrubs	Sibby Wilson	Recurring role
2027	Stewie	Morgan (voice)	Main role
