= Saturday Night Live season 33 =

Saturday Night Live
- Season 33
- No. of episodes: 12

Release
- Original network: NBC
- Original release: September 29, 2007 – May 17, 2008

Season chronology
- ← Previous season 32 Next → season 34

The thirty-third season of Saturday Night Live, an American sketch comedy series, originally aired in the United States on NBC between September 29, 2007, and May 17, 2008. Due to the 2007–08 Writers Guild of America strike, there were only 12 episodes produced in this season instead of the usual 20, making this the shortest season in the series run and beating out both the sixth (1980–1981) season and the thirteenth (1987–1988) season, which had thirteen episodes each and were also cut short due to WGA strikes. (Note: The only difference being that the hiatus in season 33 did not abruptly end the season like it had with seasons 6 and 13. In addition, season six was also cut short due to NBC executives putting Saturday Night Live on hiatus for retooling following Jean Doumanian's termination and the hiring of Dick Ebersol to salvage the show.) This is also the only season in SNL history not to have a new Christmas episode, since the WGA strike spanned from November 2007 to February 2008.

== Strike ==
On November 5, 2007, after the episode hosted by Brian Williams, the Writers Guild of America went on strike. It was announced that SNL would air its next episode on November 10, 2007 (with host Dwayne Johnson and musical guest Amy Winehouse), live on air, with a future episode to follow, featuring Jonah Hill and musical guest Kid Rock. However, on November 7, 2007, SNL's official website confirmed that those episodes were canceled and reruns would be seen beginning November 10, and would continue during the duration of the strike.

During the strike on November 17, 2007, the cast of the show, along with host Michael Cera and musical guest Yo La Tengo performed an "episode" of the show entitled Saturday Night Live - On Strike! at the Upright Citizens Brigade Theatre (co-founded by cast member Amy Poehler) in New York City. Every cast member except for Maya Rudolph (who had at that point left the cast) appeared, with former cast members Horatio Sanz and Rachel Dratch and musician Norah Jones making cameo appearances.

On February 12, 2008, the strike was announced to be officially over with a 92.5% vote. Production continued on February 18, 2008 for the February 23, 2008 episode, hosted by longtime former SNL cast member Tina Fey with musical guest Carrie Underwood.

To make up for lost time and wages, four episodes were produced back-to-back between February 23 and March 15. The "four in a row" marathon had not been done since season one in 1976.

== Cast ==
No changes to the cast happened over the summer and everyone from last season returned. Prior to the start of the season, Maya Rudolph, who had been on the show for seven seasons since 2000, announced she would be leaving the cast. However, she changed her mind ahead of the season premiere and remained on the show. When the show shut down in November due to the strike, Rudolph did not renew her contract.

Casey Wilson, a comedian and writer who frequently performed at the Upright Citizens Brigade Theater, was hired in January 2008 to fill the void left by Rudolph. However, because of the strike, Wilson did not appear on SNL until the show returned on February 23, 2008.

During the show's hiatus, Lorne Michaels held auditions for someone to play Barack Obama in political sketches for the upcoming 2008 election. Jordan Peele and Donald Glover were among those who auditioned for the role. Ultimately, cast member Fred Armisen was given the part, and he debuted as Obama in the first post-strike episode. Armisen's portrayal attracted some criticism as the comic is not himself black, but of Asian and Latino descent.

=== Cast roster ===
**Repertory players**

- Fred Armisen
- Will Forte
- Bill Hader
- Darrell Hammond
- **Seth Meyers**
- **Amy Poehler**
- Maya Rudolph (final episode: November 3, 2007)
- Andy Samberg
- Jason Sudeikis
- Kenan Thompson
- Kristen Wiig

**Featured players**

- Casey Wilson (first episode: February 23, 2008)

bold denotes Weekend Update anchor

== Writers ==
Future head writer Kent Sublette joins the writing staff this season. Rob Klein (a future head writer during different seasons) also joins the writing staff with this season. Simon Rich also joins the writing staff this season.

This was the final season for longtime head writer Harper Steele (who had been a writer for the show since 1995), as she left the show after 13 years. Steele (who became head writer in 2004) was head writer for four seasons.

This was also the final season for longtime writer Robert Smigel (who previously wrote for the show from 1985 to 1993; and had been producing the TV Funhouse cartoons for 12 years since 1996), as he permanently left the show after 20 non-consecutive years.; as well as longtime Weekend Update writer Charlie Grandy (who had writing for Update since 2001), as he left after seven years.

== Episodes ==
No. overall	No. in season	Host	Musical guest	Original release date
625	1	LeBron James	Kanye West	September 29, 2007
Kanye West performs a medley of "Stronger" and "Good Life" and a medley of "Champion" and "Everything I Am". After rapping part of "Everything I Am" using the original lyrics, Kanye West freestyles, notably saying "I meant to mess up" and expressing surprise that NBC would have him back on the air after his comments directed towards George W. Bush during "A Concert for Hurricane Relief". Additionally, West appears in the 106 & Park sketch.; Adam Levine and Jake Gyllenhaal appear in the SNL Digital Short.; Stephen Colbert and Steve Carell again voice the title characters in The Ambiguously Gay Duo sketch.; A microphone problem blocked the beginning of Don Pardo's introductions.
626	2	Seth Rogen	Spoon	October 6, 2007
Spoon performs "The Underdog" and "You Got Yr. Cherry Bomb".; Chevy Chase appears during Weekend Update.
627	3	Jon Bon Jovi	Foo Fighters	October 13, 2007
Foo Fighters perform "The Pretender". Additionally, Dave Grohl and Taylor Hawkins appear in the SNL Digital Short.; Bon Jovi performs "Lost Highway" and "Who Says You Can't Go Home".; Bon Jovi's former bandmate Richie Sambora appears in the monologue.; Jack Nicholson introduces Bon Jovi's second performance during the goodnights.
628	4	Brian Williams	Feist	November 3, 2007
Feist performs "1234" and "I Feel It All".; Barack Obama and Horatio Sanz appear during the cold open. Additionally, Sanz appears during the "Democratic Debate" sketch, in both cases reprising his impersonation of Bill Richardson.; Bono, Al Roker, and Matt Lauer appear in the SNL Digital Short.; Maya Rudolph's final episode as a cast member.
629	5	Tina Fey	Carrie Underwood	February 23, 2008
Carrie Underwood performs "All-American Girl" and "Flat on the Floor".; Amber Lee Ettinger appears as Obama Girl during the cold open.; Steve Martin appears during the opening monologue.; Former Arkansas Governor (and candidate for the 2008 Republican presidential primary) Mike Huckabee appears during Weekend Update.; Don Pardo makes a rare on-screen appearance during the good nights in celebration of his 90th birthday, which had been celebrated the previous day.; Casey Wilson's first episode as a cast member.
630	6	Ellen Page	Wilco	March 1, 2008
Wilco performs "Hate It Here" and "Walken".; Vincent D'Onofrio (as his character of Robert Goren from Law & Order: Criminal Intent) and New York Senator (and candidate for the 2008 Democratic presidential primary) Hillary Clinton appear during the cold open.; Former New York City mayor Rudy Giuliani appears during "Weekend Update".
631	7	Amy Adams	Vampire Weekend	March 8, 2008
Vampire Weekend performs "A-Punk" and "M79".
632	8	Jonah Hill	Mariah Carey	March 15, 2008
Mariah Carey performs "Touch My Body" and "Migrate", the latter with T-Pain.; Writer Jim Downey appears during the SNL Digital Short.; Tracy Morgan appears during Weekend Update.; Janet Jackson was originally confirmed to be the musical guest, but she had the flu and declined on the Tuesday before the live show.
633	9	Christopher Walken	Panic! at the Disco	April 5, 2008
Panic! at the Disco performs "Nine in the Afternoon" and "I Write Sins Not Tragedies".; Connecticut Senator Christopher Dodd appears during the SNL Digital Short.; Tina Fey appears during the "Annuale" sketch commercial, a repeat from the episode she hosted.
634	10	Ashton Kutcher	Gnarls Barkley	April 12, 2008
Gnarls Barkley performs "Run (I'm a Natural Disaster)" and "Who's Gonna Save My Soul".; Kutcher's then-wife, Demi Moore, appears in the opening monologue.; Cameron Diaz appears during "The Cougar Den" sketch.; The three-part pre-taped sketch "Death By Chocolate" is directed by Jason Reitman.
635	11	Shia LaBeouf	My Morning Jacket	May 10, 2008
My Morning Jacket performs "I'm Amazed" and "Evil Urges".
636	12	Steve Carell	Usher	May 17, 2008
Usher performs "This Ain't Sex" and "Love in This Club" (the latter with Young Jeezy) and appears during the "CPR Training" sketch.; Carell's wife Nancy Walls appears during the opening monologue.; Ricky Gervais appears during the SNL Digital Short.; Arizona Senator (and candidate for the 2008 Republican presidential primary) John McCain appears in the "McCain 2008" sketch and during "Weekend Update".

== Canceled episodes with booked guests ==
Airdate	Host	Musical Guest	Comments
November 10, 2007	Dwayne Johnson	Amy Winehouse	Dwayne "The Rock" Johnson hosted a season 34 episode in March 2009, with musical guest Ray LaMontagne. Winehouse never appeared as a musical guest prior to her death in 2011.
November 17, 2007	Jonah Hill	Kid Rock	Jonah Hill ended up hosting in March 2008, with musical guest Mariah Carey (originally, it was Janet Jackson, but she cancelled due to the flu). Kid Rock has yet to return to the show as musical guest (the last time he appeared was on the season 25 finale hosted by Jackie Chan).
December 1, 2007	Ben Affleck	Not announced	Ben Affleck ended up hosting for the fourth time on the November 1, 2008 broadcast with musical guest David Cook.
December 8, 2007	Edie Falco	Not announced	Cancelled due to writer's strike.
December 15, 2007	Tom Hanks	Not announced	Tom Hanks would have hosted a Christmas episode of SNL to coincide with the premiere of the movie Charlie Wilson's War.

== Specials ==
Title	Original release date
"SNL Family Thanksgiving Leftovers"	November 24, 2007
This special featured Thanksgiving and family-themed moments from SNL. Sketches in the special were "Debbie Downer" from the season 30 episode hosted by Luke Wilson, "Paul's Monologue Worries", "The Ladies' Man", "The Bird Family" from the season 25 episode hosted by Juliana Marguiles, "Adam Sandler's Turkey Song", "Martha Stewart Living", "Nikey Turkey", "Big Kids", "Fuzzy Memories", "Ed Grimley's Thanksgiving", "Dysfunctional Family Dinner", "Jarret's Room", "Swerski's Super Fans' Thanksgiving", "The Loud Family", and "Greetings from Tonto, Tarzan, and Frankenstein".
"The Best of Mike Myers"	June 15, 2008
The special featured an updated version of his "best of" which included new material. The new material featured Myers and the current cast talking about him and the studio. Sketches included: "Wayne's World Meets Aerosmith", "Coffee Talk with Barbra Streisand", "Simon", "Lothar of the Hill People" and more. This special also featured Myers' personal favorite sketches that he performed with Phil Hartman and Chris Farley.
