= MacGruber =

Recurring sketch on Saturday Night Live

- Logo and screenshot during the opening
- Created by: Jorma Taccone
- Written by: Will Forte; John Solomon; Jorma Taccone
- Directed by: Jorma Taccone; John Solomon
- Starring: Will Forte; Maya Rudolph; Kristen Wiig
- Country of origin: United States
- No. of seasons: 6
- No. of episodes: 35

Production
- Production locations: Studio 8H, GE Building, Rockefeller Center; New York City, New York
- Running time: approx. 1 minute
- Production companies: Broadway Video; SNL Studios

Original release
- Network: Saturday Night Live (2006–2010); Super Bowl XLIII (2009)
- Release: January 20, 2007 – November 15, 2025

Related
- MacGyver

MacGruber is a recurring sketch on the NBC television series Saturday Night Live, first appearing on the show in January 2007. The sketch is a parody of the 1985–1992 adventure series MacGyver. The sketch stars Will Forte as special operations agent MacGruber, who is tasked in each episode with deactivating a ticking bomb but becomes distracted by personal issues, resulting in the bomb's detonation. Though it is implied that MacGruber and his companions die in the explosion, the sketch normally returns for subsequent installments, with the characters having survived but MacGruber's behavior worsening because of his distractions.

MacGruber's popularity has led to a film based on the character, which was released on May 21, 2010. A television series for the streaming service Peacock premiered on December 16, 2021.

== Creation ==
The character of MacGruber was created by SNL writer Jorma Taccone. The sketches are written by Forte, Taccone and John Solomon and directed by Taccone, except for the March 2008 and May 2008 installments, which were directed by Solomon.

== Premise ==
In the sketch's first appearance of each SNL episode, MacGruber finds himself and his assistants trapped in a control room with a ticking time bomb. MacGruber's female assistant (played in 2007 by Maya Rudolph and later by Kristen Wiig and then by Chloe Fineman) and another assistant (usually played by that week's SNL host) "recap" their situation, explaining that they are in an abandoned mine, abandoned factory, or other adventure-type setting (it is a running gag that they are always locked in the control room, no matter how illogical the idea of a control room is in the context of the location where they are trapped), and that the bomb will detonate in about 15–20 seconds. As he attempts to deactivate the bomb, MacGruber calls for people to pass him ordinary objects such as rubber bands or bubble gum wrappers (a reference to the sorts of objects typically used by MacGyver in devising a way out of a jam), but MacGruber inevitably loses focus before finishing the job and the bomb explodes, ending the sketch. The replacement of his female assistant from Maya Rudolph's character to Kristen Wiig's is explained in the film adaptation of the sketch.

The sketch typically reappears for a second or third installment later in the episode, with the characters appearing none the worse for wear but MacGruber growing increasingly unhinged and his assistants becoming more disillusioned in his capabilities. Each installment ends with the bomb's detonation.

=== Family ===
MacGruber's father is the famed Angus MacGyver (Richard Dean Anderson), making his full name MacGruber MacGyver. His grandmother is portrayed by Betty White, who becomes his fiancée in her appearance. MacGruber also has an estranged homosexual son (Shia LaBeouf), whom he sends to a camp to become heterosexual over a three-sketch arc. He also has an older half-brother named Khaluber (The Great Khali) who does not speak English.

=== Themes ===
The personal issues that have distracted MacGruber and prevented him from stopping the bomb include alcoholism (Molly Shannon/Linkin Park episode), his son's homosexuality (Shia LaBeouf/My Morning Jacket episode), losing his savings due to the current economic crisis (Josh Brolin/Adele episode), discovering his long-lost father (Dwayne Johnson/Ray LaMontagne episode), his addiction to plastic surgery (Seth Rogen/Spoon episode), accusing his coworkers of talking about him behind his back (Jonah Hill/Mariah Carey episode), his grandmother telling embarrassing stories from his childhood (Betty White/Jay-Z episode), his racism (Charles Barkley/Alicia Keys episode), his belief in COVID-19 misinformation (Will Forte/Måneskin episode) and the fact that he is in the Epstein files (Glen Powell/Olivia Dean episode).

== MacGyver/Pepsi cross-over ==
During the January 31, 2009, episode of SNL, MacGyver star Richard Dean Anderson appeared with Forte in three Pepsi commercials designed to resemble MacGruber sketches. In the commercials, MacGyver complains about the poor job MacGruber is doing and accuses him of being a sellout. The commercials were later included as part of the SNL episode on Hulu.

In the second commercial, later re-aired during Super Bowl XLIII, MacGruber and MacGyver are locked in the control room of an "illegal supply ship", where MacGruber becomes distracted by the temptation of Pepsi and announces he has changed his name to "Pepsuber." In the third commercial, the MacGruber theme song lyrics and MacGruber's dialogue have been replaced by the single word "Pepsi" repeated over and over and over. When his companions finally get fed up with this and ask if he can say anything but Pepsi, MacGruber holds up a Diet Pepsi, but is only able to say "Diet Pep-" before the control room explodes, and the commercial ends.

Anderson returned to SNL on the March 7, 2009, episode, in which it was revealed that MacGyver is actually MacGruber's long-lost father (making the latter's full name "MacGruber MacGyver"), who left his mother (Abby Elliott) for a stripper named Lacey when MacGruber was a baby.

== List of MacGruber sketches and characters ==
Recurring characters in MacGruber
Character	Played By	First Appearance	Notes
MacGruber MacGyver	Will Forte	January 20, 2007	The main character; a spoof of MacGyver.
Casey Sullivan	Maya Rudolph	January 20, 2007	MacGruber's assistant.
Vicki St. Elmo	Kristen Wiig	March 15, 2008	MacGruber's assistant; replaced Casey.
Tawny Jenkins	Chloe Fineman	November 15, 2025	MacGruber's assistant; replaced Vicki.

Episode list for MacGruber skits
Original Airdate	Guest Star	Character	Distraction	Plot
January 20, 2007	Jeremy Piven	Jojo	Assistants refusing to supply disgusting things that MacGruber needs	Skit 1: At an abandoned factory, MacGruber asks Jojo (Piven) and Casey to pick up a small dog poop from the ground, but they refuse. As MacGruber angrily tries to pick it up, the factory explodes. Skit 2: At the Cedarville Dam, MacGruber tries to defuse dynamite with pine needles, a paper cup, and asks for some pubic hair from Jojo, who refuses to give him any. MacGruber approaches to forcefully remove the hair from Jojo as the dam explodes. Skit 3: In a prison boat, MacGruber asks Jojo to hand a bucket of sperm, to which Jojo immediately refuses. MacGruber tries to mention their limited time, and the bomb detonates.
May 12, 2007	Molly Shannon	April	Alcoholism	Skit 1: At a boobytrapped bridge, MacGruber asks Casey and April (Shannon) to hand him ingredients to make a Bloody Caesar and drinks it as the bomb goes off. Skit 2: At a POW prison camp, a drunk MacGruber asks April to hand him a guitar, to which he plays a drunken version of his theme song before the place explodes. Skit 3: At a drug lord's headquarters, MacGruber, having developed severe drinking problem, lazily and drunkenly eats a hamburger while shirtless. With Casey having left him, April asks MacGruber to defuse a bomb that he himself made while he was drunk. April eventually has had enough of his bad behavior and leaves as well, leaving MacGruber alone as the bomb explodes.
October 6, 2007	Seth Rogen	Caleb	Fear of aging^{1}	Skit 1: At a deserted silver mine, after Casey and Caleb (Rogen) hand him some of the materials to create a contraption to defuse the bomb, MacGruber's bandanna falls off, revealing his balding scalp. He then tells the two to look away, and he gets distracted by his vanity when he ties his bandanna back on that the bomb detonates. Skit 2: After getting some plastic surgery and some hair plugs, at a deserted desert tower, MacGruber introduces Casey and Caleb to his new (and much younger) girlfriend Taylor, who somehow ended up in the bomb room. After Casey and Caleb hand him materials, calling them "mom and dad", respectively, Taylor tells MacGruber that their friends got tickets to see Dave Matthews Band in concert. MacGruber gets distracted by Casey and Caleb's lack of reaction to this as the bomb detonates. Skit 3: In an abandoned monastery, MacGruber is setting on a stool despondently, having ruined his face after travelling to South America—where the medical standards are a lot more relaxed—for more surgeries after being cut off by his regular surgeon. He asks Casey for a mirror piece so he can look at the results of his latest plastic surgery. He then turns around, looking hideous, and saying happily, "Not so bad!", right before the place explodes.
March 15, 2008	Jonah Hill	Isaac	Co-worker gossip^{2}	Skit 1: In an abandoned bank, MacGruber is repeatedly distracted from defusing the bomb by passive-aggressively lashing out at Isaac (Hill), before revealing that a co-worker has accused Isaac of criticising and undermining MacGruber behind his back. MacGruber reveals that his feelings are hurt by this as the bomb explodes. Skit 2: At the abandoned paint factory, MacGruber has become paranoid and spiteful, interpreting everything that Isaac and Vicky say to him as a personal attack. His insecurities lead him to be chronically indecisive and he is unable to decide on what tools to use to defuse the bomb, eventually bursting into tears. When Isaac claims that he couldn't do any worse than him, MacGruber challenges him to defuse the bomb instead. After mockingly counting down during Isaac's efforts, MacGruber reaches zero only for nothing to happen; as soon as he realizes the count was off, the bomb explodes.
May 10, 2008	Shia LaBeouf	Merrill, MacGruber's son	Son's homosexuality^{3}	Skit 1: At a chemical warfare silo, MacGruber is working with his previously estranged son Merill (LaBeouf). When MacGruber asks for oil, Merill reluctantly hands over a tube of anal lubricant. MacGruber asks why he happened to have it, and Merill explains he's been experimenting. When MacGruber asks who the lucky girl is, Merill reluctantly answers 'Scott'. MacGruber stares at him disgusted until the bomb explodes. Skit 2: At a rebel training camp, Merill (who was sent by MacGruber to a gay conversion camp) refuses to work with his father who is making his son quote Bible verses and talk about women. When Merill tries to leave, MacGruber tries to stop him, only for a dildo to fall out of Merill's bag. After an awkward few seconds, the bomb explodes. Skit 3: In an angel dust production lab, MacGruber is upset to find Merill has brought Scott along. Merill claims Scott is just a friend, despite Scott obviously flirting with him, and that he's happy in his relationship with Vicky. MacGruber challenges him to kiss Vicky, however as soon as their lips touch Merill vomits into her mouth just as the bomb explodes.
October 18, 2008	Josh Brolin	Kyle	Loss of stock market investments	Skit 1: In an abandoned oil refinery, MacGruber, confident that the defusing will be easy, decides to check his stocks online, only to find out in shock that he invested poorly and lost money in the stock market as the bomb explodes. Skit 2: At an Italian Mafia hideout, MacGruber asks Kyle (Brolin) to lend him money, but Kyle refuses, so he wants his watch so he can sell it. When he refuses, MacGruber breaks a bottle and threatens both Kyle and Vicky into handing over all the accessories, including Vicky's watch. When he looks her watch to see how much time is left, the bomb explodes. Skit 3: On a human traffic supply ship, a demented MacGruber tries to convince Vicky and Kyle to pay him money to fart a ping pong ball out of his butt. When they refuse, he does it anyway, and then the ship explodes shortly after.
January 31, 2009	Richard Dean Anderson	Angus MacGyver	Bickering with MacGyver/Pepsi obsession. Skits aired as commercials for Pepsi during the Super Bowl	Skit 1: In an abandoned oil refinery, MacGruber gets into an argument with MacGyver (Anderson) over the stupidity of his name. After a while, he asks Vicky to hand him a can of Pepsi, and is about to drink it as the dynamite explodes. Skit 2: In the second commercial, later re-aired during Super Bowl XLIII, MacGruber and MacGyver are locked in the control room of an "illegal supply ship", where MacGruber becomes distracted by the temptation of Pepsi and announces he has legally changed his name to "Pepsuber." Skit 3: At an Italian Mafia hideout, MacGruber's obsession with Pepsi goes so far that he holds two cans of Pepsi in each hand, and only speaks the single word "Pepsi" repeatedly over and over, causing a huge language barrier between MacGruber and his companions. Fed up, MacGyver asks if his son can stop saying "Pepsi". MacGruber holds up two cans of Diet Pepsi, and is about to say "Diet Pepsi", but the hideout explodes.
March 7, 2009	Richard Dean Anderson	Angus MacGyver	MacGyver is revealed to be MacGruber's long lost father. Deals with father issues when MacGruber finds out why MacGyver abandoned him as a baby.^{4}	Skit 1: At a toxic oil refinery, as MacGruber tries to defuse dynamite, MacGyver (Anderson) reveals that he is MacGruber's dad, and a flashback of MacGruber's birth is shown, which took place in a room at an abandoned hospital in 1972 with a bomb that detonates. In the present, as MacGruber tries to say, "dad", the refinery explodes. Skit 2: At a smuggler's compound, as he prepares to defuse a bomb, MacGruber wonders why he was abandoned, triggering another flashback that takes place at the MacGyver home in December 1973. As he tries to leave his wife and baby MacGruber in favor of a stripper, the door is locked and the house blows up. Back in the present, MacGruber is shocked about his dad being a jerk, and MacGyver tries to leave, only to find out the door is locked, then the bomb explodes. Skit 3: With his relationship with MacGyver falling apart, at a hijacked cocaine tanker, MacGruber tries having Vicky hand over materials for bomb defusing while refusing to acknowledge MacGyver by name, while MacGyver refuses to acknowledge MacGruber by name as well. MacGruber claims that, when MacGyver dies, he will scatter his ashes in a toilet and will poop on them, then flush them down the drain. As he tries to get back to defusing the bomb, the tanker explodes. The scene goes to many years later in 2040 in outer space (Spaceport: 2040), an older MacGruber flushes MacGyver's ashes after taking a dump. He ends up being unable to defuse a bomb because one second remained, and the spaceship that he and Vicky were on explodes.
January 10, 2010	Charles Barkley	Darrel	MacGruber's racist attitude towards Darrel and his clumsy attempts at being politically correct around him.	Skit 1: On a chemical weapons steamer, MacGruber uses inappropriate slang when addressing Darrel (Barkley), whose name he continuously mispronounces. He starts to tell a racist joke when the bomb explodes. Skit 2: After taking time off work and visiting Africa to learn about their culture, at a heroin czar's headquarters, MacGruber, now dressed in traditional African clothes, attempts to make amends with Darrel, while still mispronouncing his name. Just when the two are about to shake hands, MacGruber shouts that Darrel has a gun and maces him, just before the bomb explodes. Skit 3: After completing a corporate sensitivity training course, in an insurgent cave, MacGruber attempts to use politically correct terms when speaking to Darrel, while still mispronouncing his name. He requests a black pen, but refers to it as an "African-American pen." Darrel gets fed up, but is maced again by MacGruber while handing the pen to him. After requesting a yellow pen as an "Asian pen," MacGruber admits he is racist when the bomb explodes.
May 8, 2010	Betty White	Nana, MacGruber's grandmother	Embarrassing stories about MacGruber's childhood and eventually MacGruber proposes marriage to his grandmother.	Skit 1: At a hijacked insane asylum, as MacGruber asks Vicky and Nana (White) for tools to defuse a time bomb, Nana reminds him to say "please" and "thank you" as he's handed over said tools. Nana then starts telling Vicky embarrassing childhood stories about MacGruber, despite his protests, such as finger painting with his feces, resulting in him being called "Poopcasso", as well as the fact that he was breast fed till he was 12, didn't have his first kiss till he was 16, and when he was born, they thought he was a girl for 2 months due to having micropenis, with the last causing MacGruber to furiously snap at Nana and insults her being on a motor scooter and her having white hair, much to the shock and anger of Vicky. When he tries to apologize for his outburst due to being under stress, as he shows the bomb he was trying to defuse, it explodes. Skit 2: At a clandestine guerilla airport, as MacGruber tries to defuse a mini-hydrogen bomb, Nana asks if MacGruber still had scars from a breast reduction surgery that he denies having. In his frustration, he tells her to keep her mouth shut and stop talking about childhood stories since he's trying to defuse a bomb. After being handed a paper clip and a cord from Vicky, Nana seemingly passes out to the former's shock, but MacGruber tells Vicky that Nana was just playing dead, which he claims she does it all the time for attention. When he tells Vicky to check for a pulse on Nana just in case he's wrong, MacGruber catches Nana briefly opening her eye before the bomb explodes. Skit 3: At a booby-trapped bridge, decides to end his feud with Nana (after having not spoken with each other for a couple of weeks), due to it being Mother's Day at the time. He confesses his love to Nana and actually proposes marrying to her, to which she says, "Are you out of your f**cking mind?", before actually saying "Yes". As MacGruber and Nana are about to kiss, the bomb detonates.
January 22, 2022	Ryan Phillippe	Dixon Piper, MacGruber's second assistant from the 2010 film and 2021 television series	COVID-19 misinformation, fake news and far right political polarization	Skit 1: At a Federal Resurve Bank, MacGruber burns the masks he, Vicky, and Piper (Phillipe) were wearing, and discusses his stance against face masks during the COVID-19 pandemic (claiming by burning them, he's freeing them from tyranny) and vaccines (which he thought meant putting trackers in his body), going as far as having produced a fake card from a Sizzler napkin, and also confuses the word "asymptomatic" with "antisemitic" before the bomb explodes. Skit 2: At a chemical weapons factory, MacGruber, this time with a surgical mask with a hole in it, despite his claims that he's following the science and safety protocols, asks his assistants for, and downs, ivermectin and hydroxychloroquine while drinking bleach. He reveals he has COVID-19, syphilis, herpes and actual parasitic worms, then pranks his assistants with spaghetti noodles. After asking for a roll of toilet paper with Anthony Fauci's face on it and an anti-Joe Biden t-shirt, he tries to introduce them to QAnon just before the bomb explodes. Skit 3: At a research facility, despite having had an intervention after losing friends and family, and claiming on social media that he's got his act together and trying to go outside more, MacGruber, now dressed as Jake Angeli (the so-called QAnon Shaman), has become a right-wing conspiracy theorist who tells his assistants about the QAnon theory (like celebrities eating babies). He also tells them that he supports anarchist and far-right ideologies like limited government, "my body, my choice" only for men (anti-vaccination and anti-abortion), and suppressing voting rights for non-White people, thinking that it's what creates an average American. He then proclaims himself to be an "Oath Keeper" and a "Proud Boy", and as Vicky and Piper try to remind him of the bomb, he keeps denying its existence and rants about being opposed to CNN, cancel culture, and Hollywood's wealthy elite before the bomb explodes.
November 15, 2025	Glen Powell	Colton, one of MacGruber's assistants.	MacGruber is in the Epstein Files.	Skit 1: At an FBI black site, MacGruber, Tawny (Chloe Fineman), and Colton (Powell) attempt to defuse a bomb when Colton reveals he has possession of the Epstein files. MacGruber looks through them and discovers some troubling information. He distracts his assistants with requests then puts the list through a nearby shredder. As he denies he is on the Epstein List, the bomb detonates. Skit 2: At a deep state facility, Colton has a backup copy of the Epstein files, which MacGruber uses a Sharpie to redact his name from and instead add Tawny and Colton's names to. He tapes the list to the bomb and prepares to blow all three of them up, but the bomb is faulty and does not explode. MacGruber forcibly hits the bomb against the wall multiple times until it explodes, only to discover moments before that Colton had made another backup. Skit 3: At an abandoned monastery, MacGruber admits to Colton and Tawny he is in the files. Colton suggests MacGruber testify openly against Epstein, but after hearing the bribes people are willing to give for his silence, MacGruber instead mocks them before the bomb explodes.

^1 The second part of installment also featured cast member Kristen Wiig as Taylor, MacGruber's new girlfriend.
^2 This installment also featured cast member Bill Hader as MacGruber's life coach (though the third part of this "MacGruber" installment never aired on TV and was, instead, put on NBC.com's Saturday Night Live video page).
^3 The third part of this installment also featured cast member Andy Samberg as Scott, Merrill's secret boyfriend.
^4 The first and second parts of this installment also featured cast member Abby Elliott as MacGruber's mother and Michaela Watkins as MacGyver's assistant.

== Feature film ==
On the June 1, 2009 episode of Late Night with Jimmy Fallon, Forte confirmed that a MacGruber film was being written by him, Taccone, and Solomon. The film stars Forte, Wiig, Val Kilmer, and Ryan Phillippe. The film was released on May 21, 2010, after being pushed back from April 23, 2010.

The film stirred up controversy with Lee Zlotoff, creator of the TV series MacGyver, whose contract stipulates he retained the right to a film version of the TV series which inspired the parody sketches. Zlotoff's lawyer sent several cease-and-desist letters and continued to meet with litigators to determine a course of action. As of 2010, no suit has been brought.

== Television series ==
In January 2020, it was announced that a television series is in development. Will Forte will reprise his role as well as executive produce the series with John Solomon and Jorma Taccone the latter of whom will direct the series. The show is being developed for NBCUniversal's streaming service Peacock. On August 10, 2020, it was announced that the production had been given a series order. In June 2021, Sam Elliott, Laurence Fishburne and Billy Zane joined the cast. The series premiered on December 16, 2021.

== See also ==
- Recurring Saturday Night Live characters and sketches
