= MacGruber (TV series) =

American action comedy television series

- Promotional poster
- Genre: Action comedy
- Created by: Will Forte; Jorma Taccone; John Solomon
- Based on: MacGruber by Jorma Taccone
- Starring: Will Forte; Kristen Wiig; Ryan Phillippe; Sam Elliott; Laurence Fishburne; Billy Zane; Timothy V. Murphy
- Country of origin: United States
- Original language: English
- No. of seasons: 1
- No. of episodes: 8

Production
- Executive producers: Will Forte; Jorma Taccone; John Solomon; Lorne Michaels; John Goldwyn; Andrew Singer; Erin David
- Production companies: Broadway Video; Forte Solomon Taccone Productions; Universal Television

Original release
- Network: Peacock
- Release: December 16, 2021

Related
- MacGruber (film)

MacGruber is an American action comedy television series based on the recurring Saturday Night Live sketch of the same name, a parody of the action-adventure series MacGyver. Produced as a sequel to the 2010 film, the series stars Will Forte as the title character, who goes up against Brigadier Commander Enos Queeth, a villain from his past. Kristen Wiig, Ryan Phillippe, Sam Elliott, Laurence Fishburne, Billy Zane, and Timothy V. Murphy also star. Co-produced by Universal Television and Broadway Video, filming took place in Albuquerque, New Mexico. The series was released on Peacock on December 16, 2021.

== Cast ==
=== Main ===
- Will Forte as MacGruber
- Kristen Wiig as Vicki St. Elmo
- Ryan Phillippe as Dixon Piper
- Sam Elliott as Perry, MacGruber's father
- Laurence Fishburne as General Barrett Fasoose
- Billy Zane as Brigadier Commander Enos Queeth

=== Recurring ===
- Joseph Lee Anderson as Major Harold Kernst
- Timothy V. Murphy as Constantine Bach
- Marielle Heller as MacGruber's mom
- Maya Rudolph as Casey
- Stephanie Czajkowski as Bex Dawson
- Ella Ayberk as Irina Poliskaya
- Mac Ericsson as Lil' MacGruber
- Vartan as Baker Jaxx
- Ryan Kendrick as Mac's Dad
- Angel Rosario Jr. as Chance Tucker
- Landon Ashworth as Rodney
- Sofia Embid as Stacy Piper

== Episodes ==
No.	Title	Directed by	Written by	Original release date
1	"A Good Day to Die"	Jorma Taccone	Jorma Taccone & John Solomon & Will Forte	December 16, 2021
Ten years after the events of the film, MacGruber is serving his sentence for killing Cunth in self-defense, only to be released when the president's daughter is kidnapped in a hostage situation. MacGruber is offered to be traded, at the expense of his life, which he accepts. However he makes a few stops, to try to reconnect with his colleagues whom he has thrown under the bus during his murder trial. Piper now works as a driving instructor after losing his honors due to MacGruber's arrogance and refuses to forgive him. Vicki is now dating MacGruber's commander, General Fasoose, which MacGruber accepts. He also leaves a note on a man's door (Sam Elliot) before heading back to base. The trade becomes successful, but when the military tries to pull MacGruber out, they are overpowered by the hostage leader, Enos Queeth.
2	"The Hungry Lion"	Jorma Taccone	Tim McAuliffe	December 16, 2021
3	"Brimstone"	John Solomon	Kassia Miller	December 16, 2021
4	"The Scientist"	John Solomon	David Noel	December 16, 2021
5	"Through the Looking Glass"	Jorma Taccone	Nguyen Le	December 16, 2021
6	"The Storm"	Jorma Taccone	Jorma Taccone & John Solomon & Will Forte	December 16, 2021
7	"The Architect"	John Solomon	Jorma Taccone & John Solomon & Will Forte	December 16, 2021
8	"Havencroft"	John Solomon	Jorma Taccone & John Solomon & Will Forte	December 16, 2021

== Production ==
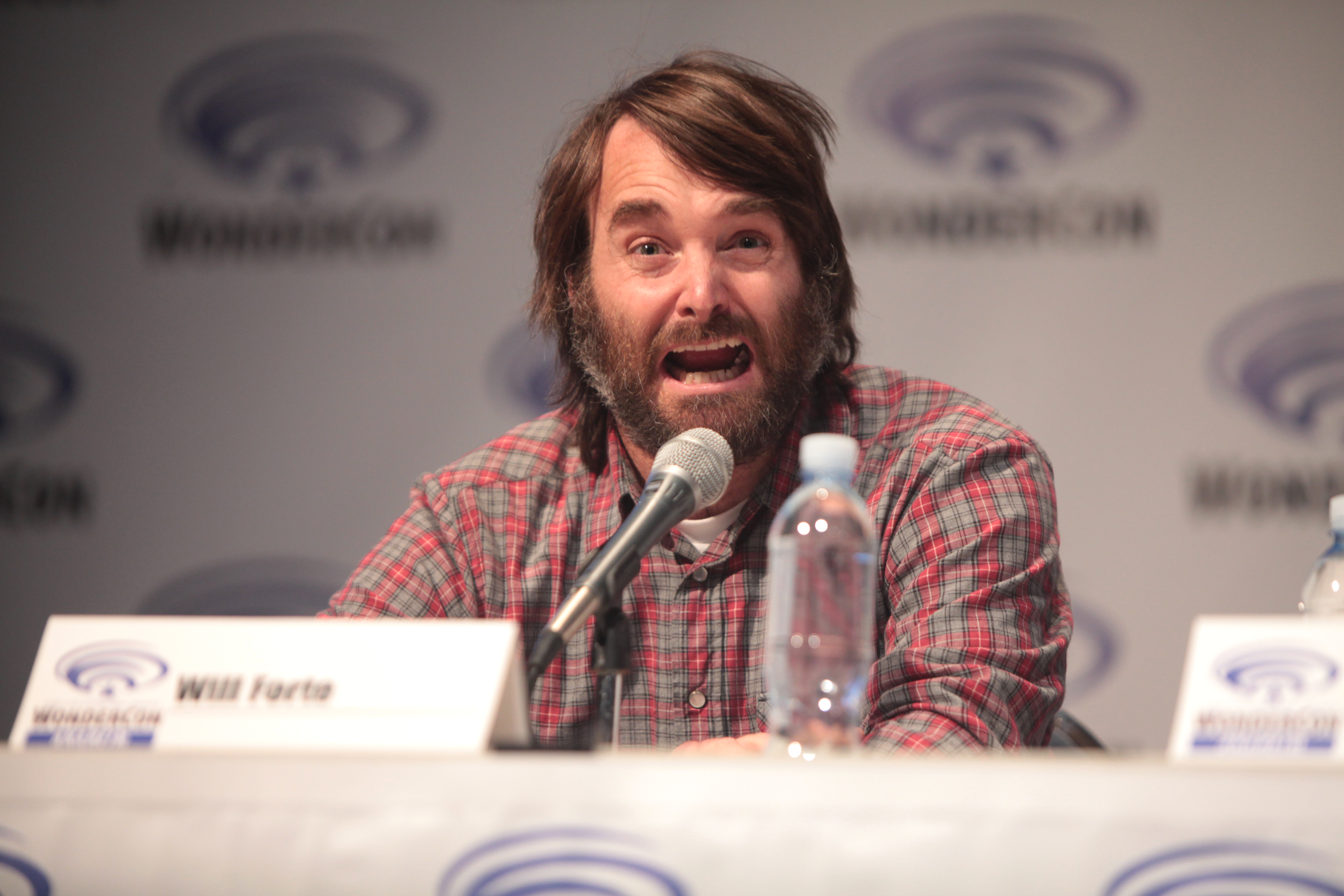
MacGruber creator and star Will Forte

MacGruber was a recurring sketch on Saturday Night Live from 2007 to 2010, co-created by comedian Will Forte and writers Jorma Taccone and John Solomon. Forte starred as the title character, an absurdist parody of the MacGyver television franchise. The sketches proved popular enough for a 2010 film adaptation of the character. Though the film was a box-office bomb in its original theatrical release, a growing cult following in the ensuing years, and continued enthusiasm from the creative team, led to development of a sequel. Focus shifted to a television project when another film was not seen to be financially viable.

Following the cancelation of the sitcom The Last Man on Earth, which Forte created and starred in and Solomon wrote and directed, their focus returned to a MacGruber revival, which was pitched with Taccone to television networks in early 2019. In November 2019, Forte mentioned the possibility of Kristen Wiig and Ryan Phillippe returning to reprise their roles from the film.

The MacGruber series was officially announced on January 16, 2020 when NBCUniversal, the distributor of both Saturday Night Live and the 2010 film, revealed the inaugural development slate for their then-upcoming streaming service Peacock. By April 2020, the scripts for all eight episodes were near completion. In August 2020, production was delayed due to the COVID-19 pandemic. On August 10, 2020, the series was officially given a series order, with Wiig and Phillippe in negotiations to star.

Taccone invited director Christopher Nolan, who had publicly discussed his enjoyment of the 2010 film, to the initial table read for the series. Nolan was unable to attend, but sent an email regarding his anticipation for the project, including that "the world is waiting, the world is watching," which Taccone said was "an amazing way to start the read-through." In June 2021, production began in Albuquerque, New Mexico, and it was confirmed that Wiig and Phillippe would reprise their roles, with Sam Elliott, Laurence Fishburne, and Mickey Rourke being added to the cast. By August 2021, Rourke left the series and was replaced by Billy Zane. Joseph Lee Anderson would join the cast in a recurring role, with Timothy V. Murphy reprising his role from the film. Filming concluded on August 23, 2021.

All eight episodes were released on Peacock on December 16, 2021.

== Reception ==
On the review aggregator website Rotten Tomatoes, 85% of 20 critics' reviews are positive, with an average rating of 7.4/10. The website's consensus reads: "MacGruber won't convert anyone who isn't already in on the joke, but it reaffirms that deadpan buffoonery is Will Forte's forte." On Metacritic, the series has a score of 64 out of 100 based on 11 critic reviews indicating "generally favorable reviews".
