= A Night at the Roxbury =

1998 film by John Fortenberry

- Theatrical release poster
- Directed by: John Fortenberry
- Written by: Will Ferrell; Chris Kattan; Steve Koren
- Produced by: Lorne Michaels; Amy Heckerling
- Starring: Will Ferrell; Chris Kattan; Dan Hedaya; Molly Shannon; Richard Grieco
- Cinematography: Francis Kenny
- Edited by: Jay Kamen
- Music by: David Kitay
- Production companies: SNL Studios; Broadway Video
- Distributed by: Paramount Pictures
- Release date: October 2, 1998
- Running time: 82 minutes
- Country: United States
- Language: English
- Budget: $17 million
- Box office: $30.3 million

A Night at the Roxbury is a 1998 American buddy comedy film based on a recurring sketch on television's long-running Saturday Night Live called "The Roxbury Guys". Saturday Night Live regulars Will Ferrell, Chris Kattan, Molly Shannon, Mark McKinney, and Colin Quinn star. This film expands on the original Saturday Night Live sketches where the Roxbury Guys were joined by that week's host, and bobbed their heads to Haddaway's hit song "What Is Love" while being comically rejected by women at various clubs.

Other roles include Jennifer Coolidge as a police officer, Chazz Palminteri's uncredited role as gregarious night club impresario Mr. Benny Zadir, and Colin Quinn as his bodyguard Dooey. Former SNL cast member Mark McKinney has a cameo as a priest officiating a wedding.

A Night at the Roxbury was released by Paramount Pictures on October 2, 1998. The film received negative reviews from critics and grossed $30.3 million against a $17 million budget.

== Plot ==
Steve and Doug Butabi are brothers who spend much of their plentiful leisure time frequenting nightclubs, where they bob their heads in unison to Eurodance, a European subgenre of electronic dance music, and fail miserably at picking up women. Their goal is to party at the Roxbury, a fabled Los Angeles nightclub where they are continually denied entry by a hulking bouncer.

By day, the two men work at an artificial plant store owned by their wealthy father, Kamehl. They spend most of their time goofing off, daydreaming about opening a club as cool as the Roxbury together, with Doug using credit card transactions as an excuse to flirt with a card approval associate via telephone that he calls "Credit Vixen." The store shares a wall with a lighting emporium owned by Fred Sanderson. Mr. Butabi and Mr. Sanderson hope that Steve and Emily, Sanderson's daughter, will marry, uniting the families and the businesses to form the first plant-lamp emporium.

After a day at the beach, the brothers decide that night was to be the night they would finally get into the Roxbury. Returning home, Doug gets into a heated argument with their father about going out clubbing instead of staying home for a dinner party with Emily and her parents. The angered Mr. Butabi then refuses them access to their BMW and their cell phones. When the brothers leave anyway, they are given enormous, embarrassingly outdated cell phones by their more sympathetic mother, Barbara, and allowed use of the plant store's Ford Econoline delivery van. The brothers go to the Roxbury, but when they are asked their names, they are once again told their names are not on the list and are denied entry.

After discovering that they might bribe their way into the club—and after realizing the $8.25 with which they initially attempted to bribe the bouncer was insufficient—the brothers drive around looking for an ATM slamming on the brakes repeatedly while in traffic causing them to get into a fender-bender with Richard Grieco. Grieco explains to the girl with him in the passenger seat that his Ferrari is a racing car and therefore illegal. Fearing a lawsuit even though the brothers show no signs of wanting to pursue legal action, Grieco uses his fame to get them into the popular club. There, Doug and Steve meet the owner of the Roxbury, Benny Zadir, who listens to their idea for their own nightclub. He likes them and sets up a meeting with them for the next day. The brothers also meet a pair of women at the Roxbury: Vivica and Cambi, who see them talking to Zadir and therefore conclude that they must be rich. The women later sleep with Doug and Steve, leading the brothers to think they are in serious relationships.

On the way to the after-party at Mr. Zadir's house, the brothers annoy his driver and bodyguard Dooey by making him stop to buy fluffy whip and making jokes about sleeping with his parents. As revenge, the next day, Dooey refuses them entry into Zadir's office for their meeting. He tells the brothers that Zadir was drunk out of his mind last night and does not know who they are. In reality, Zadir wants to see them, but does not have their contact information.

Vivica and Cambi break up with the Butabi brothers after realizing they are not actually wealthy. Afterwards, the brothers argue over who is at fault for their sudden misfortune and Doug moves out of their shared bedroom and into the guest house. Meanwhile, Steve is forced into an engagement with Emily by his father. The wedding is held in the backyard of the Butabi residence, but is interrupted by Doug. The brothers reconcile and leave, but their friend and personal trainer Craig reveals his feelings for Emily and marries her instead. Afterwards, Grieco consoles Mr. Butabi and helps him understand not only that Steve is not ready for marriage, but also that that Mr. Butabi is too hard on Doug.

After the Butabi brothers reconcile with their father and Doug moves back into their bedroom, the film ends as the brothers happen upon a hot new club. The building is unique in that the exterior is constructed to resemble the interior of a nightclub, and the interior resembles a street; this was an idea pitched by Doug and Steve to Zadir earlier in the film. Attempting to enter, they're asked their names and much to their surprise are told they are on the list. They walk into the club where they find Zadir, who reveals that to reward their idea, he has made them part-owners of the club. Their new-found success comes full circle when they meet two women in the club: Doug's phone operator from the credit card company ("Credit Vixen") and a police officer with whom Steve flirted while getting a ticket, both of whom enthusiastically accept the brothers' offer to dance.

== Cast ==
- Will Ferrell as Steve Butabi
- Chris Kattan as Doug Butabi
- Loni Anderson as Barbara Butabi
- Dan Hedaya as Kamehl Butabi
- Molly Shannon as Emily Sanderson
- Dwayne Hickman as Fred Sanderson
- Maree Cheatham as Mabel Sanderson
- Lochlyn Munro as Craig
- Richard Grieco as himself
- Kristen Dalton as Grieco's lady
- Jennifer Coolidge as Hottie Police Officer
- Meredith Scott Lynn as Credit Vixen
- Gigi Rice as Vivica
- Elisa Donovan as Cambi
- Michael Clarke Duncan as Roxbury bouncer
- Colin Quinn as Dooey
- Twink Caplan as Crying flower customer
- Eva Mendes as Bridesmaid
- Mark McKinney as Father Williams
- Chazz Palminteri as Mr. Benny Zadir
- Joe Ranft as the hottie dancer
- Agata Gotova as Waitress

== Production ==
Based on the sketch known as The Roxbury Guys, Amy Heckerling was a fan and asked co-creator Steve Koren to write a film script based on it. His original draft was described as being similar to Saturday Night Fever, but Heckerling was unimpressed as she considered the characters to be from Los Angeles and the sons of an immigrant who was disappointed in their lifestyle. Several jokes ended up on the cutting room floor including a gag where the Butabi brothers meet a coke dealer in the bathroom who offers them the substance by calling it different names. After finally breaking down and telling them what it is he is selling, the brothers were to respond by saying that they do not do drugs.

In May 2019, Kattan claimed in his memoir that he was pressured by producer Lorne Michaels to have sex with Amy Heckerling so she would direct the film (although she ultimately only produced, rather than directed it). This incident ultimately ended his friendship with Ferrell.

Shooting for the film occurred in Los Angeles between July 21, 1997, and September 18, 1997. The Roxbury was a real Los Angeles-area nightclub, located in West Hollywood on the Sunset Strip. It was a popular celebrity haunt in the mid-1990s; however, it closed in 1997, before the release of the movie. The exterior shots used to represent The Roxbury in the movie are actually those of a club formerly known as Billboard Live; ironically, Billboard Live is also the setting of the movie's first scene. The Mayan Theater in downtown Los Angeles served as the Roxbury's interior in the film.

The original real-life Roxbury location later became a taco restaurant, and most recently hosted a high-end gym as of 2024, while the Billboard Live location used for the Roxbury exterior shots in the movie is now a different nightclub, known as Keys. The two locations are only 1.3 miles apart on West Sunset Boulevard.

Film producer Elie Samaha opened a new Roxbury in Hollywood in 2011, but this club has also closed. Samaha later announced another revival of the Roxbury, to open in San Diego in late 2025, but the launch of this iteration of the club was also scrapped for reasons that remain unclear.

== Reception ==
On the review aggregator website Rotten Tomatoes, 11% of 54 critics' reviews are positive, with an average rating of 3.4/10. The website's consensus reads: "Has the same problems as the worst SNL movies: one-note characters and plots unreasonably stretched to feature length runtime." Metacritic, which uses a weighted average, assigned the film a score of 26 out of 100, based on 14 critics, indicating "generally unfavorable" reviews. General audiences, however, viewed the film more favorably, with Roxbury garnering a 69% user score on Rotten Tomatoes as of January 2026. Audiences polled by CinemaScore gave the film an average grade of "C−" on an A+ to F scale.

Anita Gates of The New York Times acknowledged the film's appeal, but reasoned that it was "a lot like the brothers themselves: undeniably pathetic but strangely lovable. Still, do you really want to spend an hour and a half with them in a dark room?" Roger Ebert observed that "the sad thing about A Night at the Roxbury is that the characters are in a one-joke movie, and they're the joke... It's the first comedy I've attended where you feel that to laugh would be cruel to the characters."

== Soundtrack ==
A Night at the Roxbury: Music from the Motion Picture

Soundtrack album by Various Artists
- Released: September 29, 1998
- Genres: Eurodance, dance-pop, house, synth-pop, disco, gapless playback
- Length: 60:40
- Label: DreamWorks
- Producer: David Kitay

The film's soundtrack album was released on September 29, 1998, by DreamWorks Records. It was one of only three film soundtracks that DreamWorks Records ever released which weren't related to their parent company DreamWorks Pictures, with the other two also being for comedy films owned by Paramount Pictures (1998's Dead Man on Campus and 2000's The Ladies Man). Paramount's parent company Viacom later acquired the live-action library of DreamWorks Pictures for $1.6 billion in 2006, although DreamWorks Records itself was sold to Universal Music Group for $100 million in 2003.

=== Track listing ===
No.	Title	Artist(s)	Length
1.	"What Is Love"	Haddaway	3:53
2.	"Bamboogie" (Radio Edit)	Bamboo	3:15
3.	"Make That Money" (Roxbury Remix)	Robi Rob's Clubworld	3:51
4.	"Disco Inferno"	Cyndi Lauper	3:18
5.	"Do Ya Think I'm Sexy"	N-Trance featuring Rod Stewart	3:25
6.	"Pop Muzik"	3rd Party	3:05
7.	"Insomnia" (Monster Mix)	Faithless	6:45
8.	"Be My Lover" (Club Mix)	La Bouche	5:35
9.	"This Is Your Night"	Amber	3:52
10.	"Beautiful Life"	Ace of Base	3:11
11.	"Where Do You Go" (Ocean Drive Mix)	No Mercy	7:21
12.	"A Little Bit of Ecstasy"	Jocelyn Enriquez	3:59
13.	"What Is Love" (Refreshmento Extro Radio Mix)	Haddaway
14.	"Careless Whisper"	Tamia	5:27

=== Certifications ===
Region	Certification	Certified units/sales
Canada (Music Canada)	Platinum	100,000^{^}
United States (RIAA)	Gold	500,000^{^}
^{^} Shipments figures based on certification alone.
