= SNL Studios =

American production company

- Type: Joint venture
- Industry: Production company
- Founded: 1997; 29 years ago
- Products: Saturday Night Live; A Night at the Roxbury; Superstar; The Ladies Man; Saturday Night Live UK
- Owners: Lorne Michaels; Universal Television (formerly NBC Studios); Paramount Pictures (1997–2004)

SNL Studios (also known as "Saturday Night Live Studios") is an American production company founded in 1997 as a joint venture between Saturday Night Live creator and producer Lorne Michaels, NBC Studios, and, initially, Paramount Pictures. Paramount's part of the venture was dissolved in 2004 following NBC's merger with Universal Pictures to form NBCUniversal. SNL Studios currently produces Saturday Night Live and its British version in association with Broadway Video (also owned by Michaels), and in the past also produced movies, mainly featuring Saturday Night Live sketch characters: A Night at the Roxbury, Superstar and The Ladies Man.

== History ==
=== Before SNL Studios ===
Prior to SNL Studios' formation, several films based on popular Saturday Night Live sketches were produced in addition to the series itself. The first of these was The Blues Brothers, released on June 20, 1980 by Universal Pictures (24 years prior to its merger with NBC), directed by John Landis and starring John Belushi and Dan Aykroyd, based on their band of the same name that performed on the show in sketches. The film received positive reviews from critics, grossed $115 million in theaters, and has since become a cult classic. However, it was the second SNL film, Wayne's World, released 12 years later on February 14, 1992, that would successfully kickstart the trend of films based on SNL sketches. Wanye's World starred Mike Myers and Dana Carvey and was based on Myers' own SNL sketch. Wayne's World, produced by SNL creator Lorne Michaels, was released by Paramount Pictures, which at the time had a film production deal with Michaels.

Throughout the 90's, Paramount would go on to release several titles based on SNL sketches; the only ones during that time that they weren't involved with were It's Pat (released by Touchstone Pictures) and Blues Brothers 2000 (released by Universal as they distributed the original movie). With the exceptions of Wayne's World and its sequel, many of these films were critically panned, and only a few were successful at the box office.

=== Formation and subsequent history ===
In 1997, a decision was made to create a production company centered around the SNL name; thus, SNL Studios was formed, originally established as a joint venture between Lorne Michaels, NBC Studios, and Paramount, the third of which left the venture after the NBC-Universal merger in 2004. Following the announcement of SNL Studios' creation, veteran Saturday Night Live producer Marci Klein was named as the president of SNL Studios Television in 1999, while Richard Feldman was appointed head of SNL Studios Films in June of the same year. A Night at the Roxbury was the first film produced under the name, released in 1998, though no on-screen logo was used until a year later with the release of Superstar. SNL Studios would also proceed to take over production of the SNL series from NBC Studios beginning in 1999, with Michaels' other company, Broadway Video, remaining on board.

To date, there have been no new films produced under the label after The Ladies Man. Another film based on an SNL sketch, MacGruber, would be released in 2010, although it would not carry the SNL Studios name. SNL Studios continues to produce the Saturday Night Live TV show.

== Filmography ==
=== Films ===
All films listed are distributed by Paramount Pictures.

Title	Release date
A Night at the Roxbury	October 2, 1998
Superstar	October 5, 1999
The Ladies Man	October 13, 2000

=== TV series ===
Title	Air date	Notes
Saturday Night Live	1999–present	Co-production with Broadway Video; previously co-produced by NBC Productions (1975–1996) and NBC Studios (1996–1999)
Saturday Night Live UK	2026–present	Co-production with Universal Television Alternative Studio UK, Broadway Video, and Sky Studios

== See also ==
- List of Saturday Night Live feature films
