= Landon Ashworth =

American actor and filmmaker (born 1984)

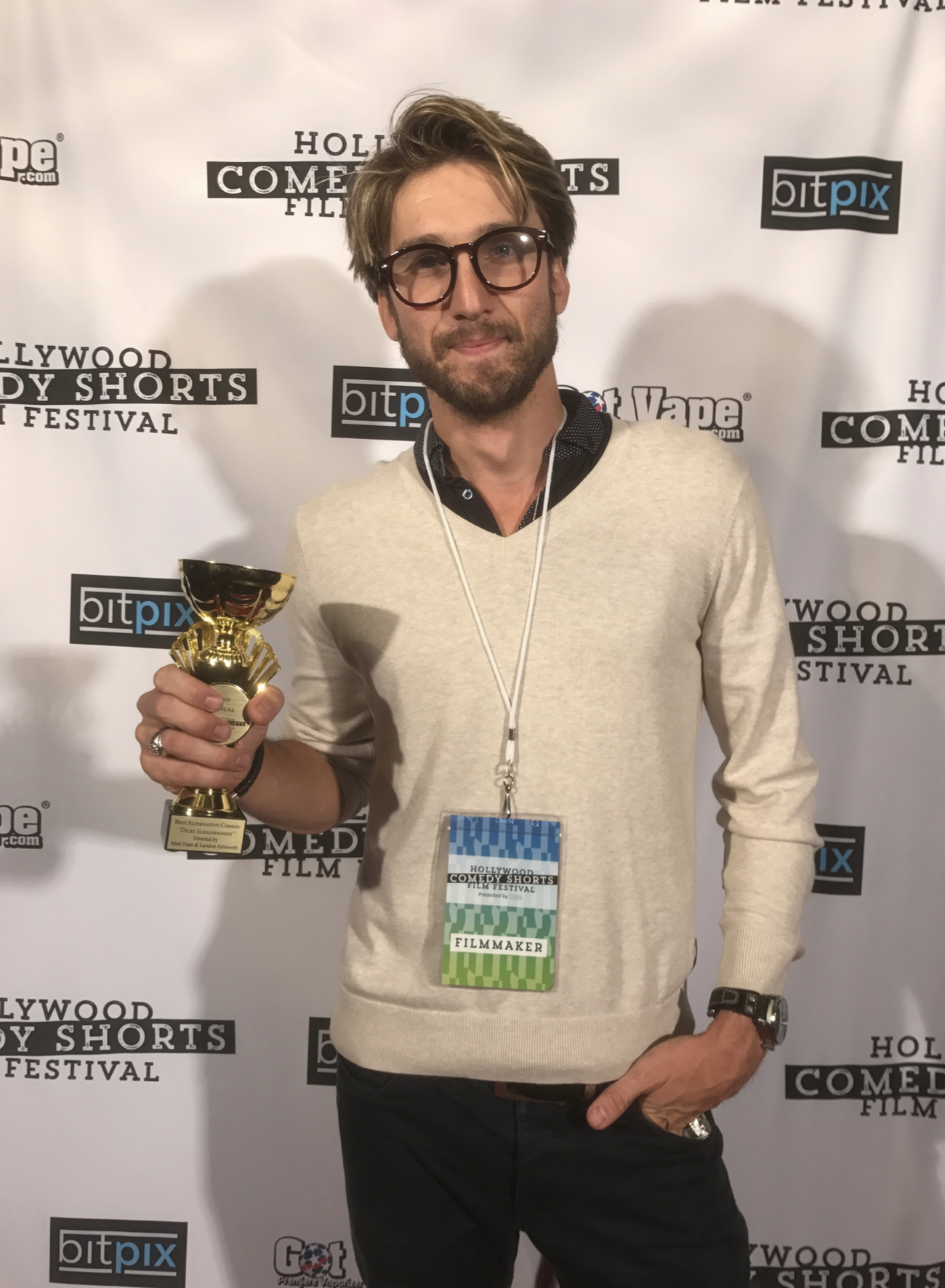
- Ashworth in 2019
- Occupations: Film actor; Television actor; Director; Screenwriter
- Years active: 2006–present

Landon Ashworth is an American actor, director, and pilot who is on the autism spectrum. He is a graduate of Embry Riddle Aeronautical University.

== Early life ==
Landon was diagnosed at a very early age with autism spectrum disorder, and in his adult life has been a vocal advocate for the autism community.

Ashworth aspired to become an astronaut. He graduated with an undergrad degree from Embry Riddle Aeronautical University with a Bachelors of Science and became a test pilot for NOAA flying whale protection missions. To build jet hours, he worked as a pilot for United Airlines. He also studied filmmaking.

Ashworth then moved to Los Angeles to attempt a career in the arts, starting in 2010, booking a role on Castle in 2011. He has appeared in over a dozen TV shows, and is a screenwriter and director.

== Career ==
Before entering the entertainment industry, Ashworth’s undergraduate degree was earned from Embry–Riddle Aeronautical University and trained as a civilian test pilot, logging flight hours for NOAA, a contractor providing aerial survey for SpaceX and later United Airlines.

He began acting professionally in the late 2000s, making early appearances on CSI: Miami, Castle, and Awake. He went on to work regularly in television, with guest roles on NCIS: Los Angeles, Super Fun Night, Code Black, Days of Our Lives, NCIS, Space Force, MacGruber, and The Resident.

Alongside acting, Ashworth established himself as a commercial director, particularly in the golf industry.

He transitioned into narrative filmmaking with award-winning shorts. In 2020, Ashworth became the only writer to win Best Screenplay at both the Raindance Film Festival in London and the Atlanta Film Festival in the same year.

Ashworth built a large digital audience by adapting unused commercial concepts into comedy sketches. His viral Texas Tot series and golf sketches helped him amass more than three million social media followers.

In 2024, Ashworth made his feature film directorial debut with the fantasy drama Go On, which he also wrote and starred in. The film co-stars Vincent Kartheiser and Laura Slade Wiggins, and entered production in Montezuma, New Mexico, under the oversight of the New Mexico Film Office.

=== Feature film directorial-debut ===
Ashworth wrote, directed, and stars in the 2024 fantasy drama Go On, marking his feature film directorial debut. The film was nominated for best picture at SoHo Film Festival, Albuquerque Film Festival, and won 2025 Best US Feature at the Catalina Film Festival. The film centers on two strangers stranded on a smoky, fire-scarred mountain, each grappling with their pasts as they confront grief, healing, and the unknown. Vincent Kartheiser (Mad Men) and Laura Slade Wiggins (Shameless) co-star alongside Ashworth. Production commenced in September 2024 in and around Montezuma, New Mexico. Ashworth has expressed that bringing such meaningful material to life in his first feature—and working with esteemed actors like Kartheiser and Wiggins—was an honor and fulfilled a longtime dream.

== Filmography ==
=== Television series ===
- Castle (2011)
- CSI: Miami (2012)
- Awake (2012)
- NCIS: Los Angeles (2013)
- Super Fun Night (2013)
- Code Black (2015)
- My Haunted House (2016)
- Days of Our Lives (2016)
- NCIS (2018)
- The Conan O'Brien Show (2019)
- Space Force (2020)
- MacGruber (2021)
- The Resident (2023)
- Boots (2025)

=== Film and television movies ===
- Role Models (2008)
- Land of the Lost (2009)
- A Warm Wind
- The Republic of Two (2013)
- Claire (2013)
- Turn Around Jake (2014)
- Human Resources (2015)
- Silent Retreat (2016)
- Becoming Bond (2017)
- Baby Splitters (2019)
- She Watches From the Woods (2021)
- My Professor's Guide to Murder (2023)

== Nominations and awards ==
Nominations and awards
Big Star Entertainment Awards	Won for Best Screenplay	2013
Austin Comedy Film Festival	Nominated for Best Actor and Director	2016
Boston International Comedy and Movie Festival	Won for Best Actor and Best Director	2016
Comedy Ninja Film and Screenplay Festival	Nominated for Best Actor and Best Director	2016
LA Comedy Shorts	Won for Best Film and Best Actor	2016
LA Comedy Shorts	Nominated for Best Screenplay	2016
LA Shorts Fest	Nominated for Best Short Film	2016
Atlanta Comedy Film Festival	Won for Best Actor	2019
Raindance Film Festival	Won for Best Pilot	2023
Atlanta Film Festival	Won for Best Pilot Screenplay	2023
Catalina International Film Festival	Won for Best Picture	2025
