= Becoming Bond =

- Directed by: Josh Greenbaum
- Written by: Josh Greenbaum
- Based on: George Lazenby as James Bond in On Her Majesty's Secret Service
- Produced by: David de Rothschild; Josh Greenbaum; Rafael Marmor; Christopher Leggett
- Starring: George Lazenby; Josh Lawson; Kassandra Clementi; Landon Ashworth; Jane Seymour; Jeff Garlin; Jake Johnson; Dana Carvey
- Cinematography: John W. Rutland
- Edited by: Billy McMillin
- Music by: John Piscitello
- Production company: Delirio Films
- Distributed by: Hulu
- Release date: May 20, 2017
- Running time: 95 minutes
- Country: United States
- Language: English

Becoming Bond is a 2017 American docudrama film that explores the early life and casting of Australian actor George Lazenby as James Bond in the film On Her Majesty's Secret Service, his eventual decision to leave the role and the effect it all had on his career and the rest of his life. The film employs the use of re-enacted dramatizations of Lazenby's life interspersed with actual interview footage of him. The film was written, produced, and directed by Josh Greenbaum, and premiered on Hulu on May 20, 2017.

== Plot ==
The story itself is told through an interview with Lazenby, with cutaways to reenactments where actors lip-synch to or voiceover Lazenby's dialogue. Lazenby describes his birth as an at-risk infant and how his humiliation at being the only student to fail in his school grade and attend graduation without receiving his certificate made an impact on him to never fail at anything again.

After getting a job as a car mechanic, he noticed that the car salesmen seemed to have a much more glamorous life, so he convinced the dealership manager to let him try his hand at sales. After failing to sell any cars, he attended a course from the popular "How to Win Friends and Influence People" symposium, where the only lesson he recalls learning is: "Listen first and let the other person do the talking." Pretty soon, he was successful at the job, and was the key contact for embassy staff vehicle transactions, which brought him in contact with the granddaughter of an Australian politician. When she moved to London, he followed as a steerage passenger, hoping to win her heart. Upon his arrival, he discovered she had abandoned him in pursuit of a player on the Oxford University cricket team. Fearing he had once again failed in life, his attempts to charm her set him on a path that would land him the role as one of the smoothest leading male characters in film history: James Bond, who always "gets the girl" in the end.

The Bond film, entitled On Her Majesty's Secret Service, was released in December 1969 to steady acclaim, box-office record sales and sent Lazenby into the path of one of Hollywood's next stars. Unfortunately, being James Bond meant surrendering his own sense of self, and he walked away from the fame and fortune that would have come with the role, after his one and only film in the franchise. Following a dwindling in his film career, Lazenby settled back in Australia, where he became a realtor, married, raised a family and led a happy and normal life.

In retrospect, Lazenby in the present day has found his peace in everything he did before and after Bond. Additionally, Lazenby was given much acclaim in modern times for his role as James Bond, with On Her Majesty's Secret Service held in high regard, and considered as one of the finest films in the franchise - and even the best by some.

== Cast ==
- George Lazenby as himself

Reenactment cast

- Josh Lawson as George
- Kassandra Clementi as Belinda
- Teressa Liane as June Green
- Landon Ashworth as Ken Gherety
- Nathan Lovejoy as Chook Warner
- Jane Seymour as Maggie
- Jeff Garlin as Harry Saltzman
- Jake Johnson as Peregrine Carruthers
- Dana Carvey as Johnny Carson

== Reception ==
Becoming Bond has received positive reviews from critics. On the review aggregation website Rotten Tomatoes, it holds an 78% approval rating with an average rating of 6.51/10 based on 18 reviews; the critical consensus reads: "Becoming Bond is an uproarious recreation of George Lazenby's colorful stint as Britain's greatest spy, evidencing that the gregarious Australian may be a greater raconteur than he was a 00". On Metacritic, which uses a weighted average, the film has a score of 65 out of 100 based on four reviews, indicating "generally favorable" reviews.

== See also ==
- List of original programs distributed by Hulu
