= Alien News Desk =

- Genre: Comedy
- Created by: Chris Prynoski; Austin Reading
- Starring: Will Forte; Heidi Gardner
- Theme music composer: Frank Ciampi
- Country of origin: United States
- Original language: English
- No. of seasons: 1
- No. of episodes: 12

Production
- Executive producers: Andrew Singer; Dennis McNicholas; Erik Kenward; Joel Kuwahara; Lorne Michaels; Scott Greenberg
- Running time: 22 minutes
- Production companies: Bento Box Entertainment; Broadway Video

Original release
- Network: Syfy
- Release: February 27 – May 4, 2019

Alien News Desk is an American adult animated television series created by Chris Prynoski and Austin Reading. The series stars Will Forte and Heidi Gardner. The series premiered on Syfy on February 27, 2019.

== Plot ==
The series focuses on alien news anchors Drexx Drudlarr and Tuva Van Void, as they tell the news about Earth from an alien's perspective.

== Cast ==
- Will Forte as Drexx Drudlarr, a neon pink squid-like alien.
- Heidi Gardner as Tuva Van Void, a teal alien robot.

== Episodes ==
No.	Title	Directed by	Written by	Original release date	Prod. code	U.S. viewers (millions)
1	"Ungrateful Wads of Protein"	Lauren Andrews	Sam West	February 27, 2019	101	0.19
Drexx and Tuva talk about Earth on "Invade It or Avoid It", The Academy Awards, fracking, the Royal Family, universities on "Eye on Education", airports, clowns, Pope Francis, Popeyes, horse jockeys, and casinos.
2	"Inane Utterings of a Brainwashed People"	Jeannette Moreno King	Scott Gairdner	March 6, 2019	102	0.20
Shocking reports on floating prisons, anti-poor fabrics, and a barbaric act known as ventriloquism.
3	"Udder Madness"	Jeannette Moreno King	Dennis McNicholas	March 16, 2019	103	0.13
Meet some special vehicles called "Indycars" and the grotesque pseudo-humans called "bodybuilders".
4	"Simultaneous Vortex Exit"	Lauren Andrews	Sam West	March 23, 2019	104	0.18
Drexx joins the gig economy, and Tuva fights robot appropriation.
5	"A Bunch of Space Bums"	Jeannette Moreno King	Scott Gairdner	March 30, 2019	105	0.28
Drexx and Tuva grapple with love, doping, and a very wordy segment name.
6	"A Very Norffy Gronksmas"	Lauren Andrews	Sam West	April 6, 2019	106	0.23
Where is Barack Obama? Who is The Spoiler? And what's the deal with Drake?
7	"Corrupt, Bloviating Narcissists"	Jeanette Moreno King	Josh Patten	April 13, 2019	107	0.18
Drexx and Tuva visit the kingdom of The Masters. Then, a handy guide on how to probe yourself.
8	"A Wasteland of Rehashed Dreck"	Lauren Andrews	Lauren Moser	April 20, 2019	108	0.21
What is 4/20 and why does it make humans giggle? Plus, a joyous celebration of Tax Day.
9	"Cumbersome Dongles"	Jeanette Moreno King	Lauren Moser and Josh Patten	April 27, 2019	109	0.47
The wall, the welfare queen, and a chef (Chris Parnell) cooks up the garbage humans call "food".
10	"Bloated Acquisition Piles"	Lauren Andrews	Scott Gairdner	April 27, 2019	110	0.30
A sexy report on corporate mergers. Plus, meet Drexx's pal Lord Xenu.
11	"Princes of Mange"	Jeanette Moreno King	Lauren Moser	May 4, 2019	111	0.23
Humanity's biggest threats: spidered-men, twins and the vengeful gods known as "mascots".
12	"The Ultimate Shape-Shifter Shaft"	Lauren Andrews	Dennis McNicholas	May 4, 2019	112	0.14
Drexx and Tuva reckon with the galaxy's ultimate shame: getting rebooted.
