= MacGruber (film) =

2010 film by Jorma Taccone

- Theatrical release poster
- Directed by: Jorma Taccone
- Screenplay by: Will Forte; John Solomon; Jorma Taccone
- Based on: MacGruber by: Will Forte; John Solomon; Jorma Taccone
- Produced by: Lorne Michaels; John Goldwyn
- Starring: Will Forte; Kristen Wiig; Ryan Phillippe; Powers Boothe; Maya Rudolph; Val Kilmer
- Cinematography: Brandon Trost
- Edited by: Jamie Gross
- Music by: Matthew Compton
- Production companies: Rogue Pictures; Relativity Media; Michaels-Goldwyn; Broadway Video
- Distributed by: Universal Pictures
- Release dates: March 15, 2010 (SXSW); May 21, 2010 (United States)
- Running time: 91 minutes
- Country: United States
- Language: English
- Budget: $10 million
- Box office: $9.3 million

MacGruber is a 2010 American action comedy film based on the Saturday Night Live sketch of the same name, which itself was a parody of action-adventure television series MacGyver. Directed by Jorma Taccone (in his directorial debut) and written by Taccone, Will Forte, and John Solomon, it stars Forte in the title role; Kristen Wiig as Vicki St. Elmo, MacGruber's work partner and love interest; Ryan Phillippe as Dixon Piper, a young lieutenant who becomes part of MacGruber's team; Maya Rudolph as Casey, MacGruber's deceased wife; and Val Kilmer as Dieter von Cunth, the villain.

The film expands the sketch's premise into a deadpan send-up of 1980s and 1990s action cinema, drawing inspiration from films such as Lethal Weapon. The creative team set out to construct a sincere action narrative around its absurd, narcissistic protagonist, while retaining the sketch's heightened vulgarity and unpredictable comedic tone. It was produced under a tight schedule while its writers were still working weekly on SNL. Shot in Albuquerque, New Mexico on a modest budget, MacGruber was given significant creative freedom, and employs stylized cinematography to closely mimic the action blockbusters it parodied. The film was released in the United States by Universal Pictures on May 21, 2010.

Famously considered one of SNL's biggest theatrical misfires, MacGruber opened to weak box-office returns, grossing $9.3 million worldwide against a $10 million budget. It also received mixed critical reviews, with some praising its committed performances and anti-comedy sensibility while others criticized its shock humor and uneven tone. Over time, however, the film has developed a substantial cult following, with critics and filmmakers alike reassessing its bold comedic style; its enduring popularity ultimately led to a television series continuation released on Peacock in 2021.

== Plot ==
In eastern Siberia's Dzhugdzhur Mountains, Dieter Von Cunth and his men take control of a nuclear X-5 warhead. In Ecuador, Col. Jim Faith and Lt. Dixon Piper are searching for former Green Beret, Navy SEAL and Army Ranger MacGruber. Finding him meditating in a chapel, they ask him to retrieve the warhead. He refuses. That night, MacGruber explodes into a fit of rage, waking from the flashback of Cunth killing his fiancée, Casey Fitzpatrick, at their wedding. He accepts the mission.

After a heated conversation with Faith and Piper at the Pentagon, MacGruber creates a list and travels to the U.S. to form his team to pursue Cunth. Recruiting all but his long-time friend Vicki St. Elmo and Brick Hughes. MacGruber meets Faith and Piper on the tarmac, while his team is in a van with his homemade C-4 explosives, which explode, killing his entire team. Faith takes MacGruber off the case. MacGruber convinces Piper to form a new team, and Vicki arrives at the Pentagon to join them in taking down Cunth.

They travel to Cunth's nightclub in Las Vegas. A driver in the parking lot is rude to MacGruber and angers him, so he repeats the license plate number KFBR392 obsessively to remember it. MacGruber gets on stage and announces who he is, his intentions, and where he will be the next day.

Their sting operation has Vicki portraying MacGruber. Hoss Bender, Cunth's henchman, attacks MacGruber and Piper's van, but MacGruber runs down and kills Bender. With Vicki disguised as Bender and Piper disguised as MacGruber, the team attempts to break into a warehouse to stop Cunth from getting the rocket operation passwords. MacGruber distracts the guards and Piper kills most of the men, but cannot stop the transfer of the passcodes. At Cunth's charity event MacGruber confronts and threatens him and his guards, who throw him out.

MacGruber returns to the Pentagon where Faith reprimands him and takes him off of the case. MacGruber and Piper have beers outside his trailer while MacGruber explains his history with Cunth: MacGruber met him and Casey Fitzpatrick while they were in college; Cunth was engaged to Casey until her affair with MacGruber, who asked her to abort Cunth's baby.

MacGruber uses Piper as a human shield to survive an ambush, escaping with Vicki. They believe that Piper was killed in the attack, but he reveals that he was wearing a bulletproof vest. Commending MacGruber on his quick thinking, only to realize that MacGruber wasn't aware of the vest, Piper leaves the team. Seeing MacGruber has been shot in the leg, Vicki takes him back to her house to remove the bullet. She confesses her love to him, admits she is a virgin, and they make love. MacGruber goes to his bride's grave in shame, but her ghost gives her blessing (and has sex with him on her tombstone).

At Vicki's, MacGruber discovers Cunth has kidnapped her and realizes Cunth plans to blow up Congress during the State of the Union. He calls Col. Faith to inform him and then finds and destroys the KFBR392 car. Cunth calls MacGruber to gloat, MacGruber traces the call and Piper agrees to help on one last mission. Making their way into Cunth's compound, they are captured and taken to Cunth, Vicki and the missile. They pound Cunth and crew into submission and MacGruber handcuffs Cunth to a handrail. They remove the warhead and guidance system, and escape as the missile explodes. Cunth escapes using an axe to chop off his handcuffed hand.

Six months later, at MacGruber and Vicki's wedding are his dead team members as ghosts. Mirroring his wedding to Casey, MacGruber spots Cunth with an RPG. He saves Vicki and battles Cunth, throwing him off a cliff behind the altar, shooting him with a machine gun and launching a grenade as he falls, incinerating the corpse, and finally urinating on it from the top of the cliff.

== Cast ==
- Will Forte as MacGruber
- Kristen Wiig as Vicki Gloria St. Elmo
- Ryan Phillippe as Lieutenant Dixon Piper
- Val Kilmer as Dieter Von Cunth
- Maya Rudolph as Casey Janine Fitzpatrick
- Powers Boothe as Colonel Jim Faith
- Timothy V. Murphy as Constantine Bach
- Chris Jericho as Frank Korver
- Montel Vontavious Porter as Vernon Freedom
- The Great Khali as Tug Phelps
- Big Show as Brick Hughes
- Mark Henry as Tut Beemer
- Kane as Tanker Lutz
- Rhys Coiro as Yerik Novikov
- Andy Mackenzie as Hoss Bender
- Derek Mears as Large henchman
- Kevin Skousen as Senator Garver
- Jasper Cole as Zeke Pleshette
- Brandon Trost as Brick's boyfriend
- Jason Trost as Smoking guard
- Chris Kittinger as Man in Tuxedo
- Marielle Heller as Clocky
- Amar'e Stoudemire as himself
- DJ Nu-Mark (uncredited) as Club DJ

== Production ==
What you see with this movie is exactly what we wanted to do. It's the three of us having a bunch of fun writing it, then having fun making it with a bunch of our friends—old friends and new friends. I think that fun comes across when you watch it. It's rare that you get that kind of creative freedom.

— Will Forte to The A.V. Club, 2010

MacGruber is based on a recurring sketch on Saturday Night Live, a parody of the television series MacGyver. It was created by writer Jorma Taccone, who pitched the idea to cast member/writer Will Forte over a period of several weeks. Forte was initially reluctant to commit to the sketch, deeming it too dumb, but accepted after persuasion from Taccone. The first sketch aired in January 2007, and led to multiple more segments in the following years. In 2009, the sketches were spun off into a series of commercials sponsored by Pepsi premiering during Super Bowl XLIII that featured the actor behind MacGyver, Richard Dean Anderson, as MacGruber's father. The advertisements led the character and sketches to receive a wider level of popularity.

Following the success of the advertisements, creator Lorne Michaels approached Forte, Taccone, and writer John Solomon with the idea to produce a MacGruber film, and they were at first skeptical. They began pitching ideas for a potential feature-length adaptation, deciding first and foremost it would not be the sketch repeated for its entire runtime. The film's central conceit was to produce a real action film, with MacGruber as comic relief. It was inspired by their love of 1980s–90s action films, such as Lethal Weapon, Rambo, and Die Hard. To this end, it is considerably more deadpan in its parody, with most characters outside MacGruber designed to be "as serious as possible". The most difficult part of the writing process was to portray MacGruber—an "insanely flawed [and] narcissistic" individual—as a likable lead character.

The film was written while simultaneously producing a weekly episode of SNL, and the show's production process left the trio fully deprived of sleep. This led to sequences deemed "crazier," such as a scene involving celery. There was concern the film might receive an NC-17 rating from the Motion Picture Association of America, which could lead to certain commercial disappointment. The script was written in five weeks by Taccone and Forte, with a first draft coming in at 177 pages and lacking a third act. It was subsequently re-written under budgetary concerns, which mostly involved deleting scenes containing special effects. Forte praised the level of creative freedom afforded to the filmmakers, noting that even the more outrageous jokes were allowed to remain in the final film.

On the June 1, 2009, episode of Late Night with Jimmy Fallon, Forte announced that MacGruber had been greenlit and production was to begin on August 9, with Jimmy Fallon adding on the July 29 episode that it would be filmed in Albuquerque, New Mexico. Cameos by WWE wrestlers Chris Jericho, The Big Show, Mark Henry, Kane, MVP and The Great Khali and actor Derek Mears, were later confirmed.

Following a short six-week period of preparation, the film was shot between August 10 and September 13, 2009, in Albuquerque, New Mexico. The film shoot employed a crew composed of local workers as a part of a tax credit. The quick film schedule of 28 days led to the filmmakers adjusting scenes to complete them on time, as the presence of automatic weapons on set would slow down the process. Keeping in line with their sources for parody, the filmmakers opted for cinematography emulating the style of blockbuster action films. This involved most prominently using smoke machines for interior areas, as they noticed similar scenes in Lethal Weapon inexplicably contain prominent smoke.

=== Legal disputes ===
Prior to the film's release, MacGruber stirred controversy with Lee David Zlotoff, creator of the TV series MacGyver, whose contract stipulates he retains the right to a film version of the TV series. In 2010, his lawyer sent several cease-and-desist letters and met with litigators to determine a course of action. No suit was brought.

== Marketing ==
Pictures were leaked on the Internet on January 6, 2010. A two-minute red band trailer was released on January 19, 2010, and the next day, January 20, a green band trailer was released.

On April 19, 2010, Forte, Wiig, and Phillippe hosted WWE Raw from the Izod Center in East Rutherford, New Jersey in character to promote the film.

Phillippe guest hosted Saturday Night Live on April 17, 2010, and made reference to the film in his opening monologue.

== Release ==
Initially set for a release date of April 23, 2010, the film eventually opened on May 21, 2010, in the United States.

=== Box office ===
The film grossed $1,569,025 on its opening day, and $4,043,945 for its opening weekend. The film earned a total of $8,460,995 by the end of its third weekend, against its $10 million production cost.

In July 2010, Parade listed the film #2 on its list of "Biggest Box Office Flops of 2010."

MacGruber realized a third-week drop of showings of 94%, from 2,546 to 177 theaters. The film was removed from theaters after the third week.

=== Critical response ===
On the review aggregator website Rotten Tomatoes, 47% of 152 critics' reviews are positive. The website's consensus reads: "It too often mistakes shock value for real humor, but MacGruber is better than many SNL films – and better than it probably should be." Metacritic, which uses a weighted average, assigned the film a score of 43 out of 100, based on 24 critics, indicating "mixed or average" reviews. Audiences polled by CinemaScore gave the film an average grade of "C−" on an A+ to F scale.

John DeFore of The Hollywood Reporter felt it was "utterly disposable but diverting." Peter Travers of Rolling Stone praised the "unabashed affection" of Taccone's directorial style while commending Forte's performance as "contagious." The Boston Globe's Ty Burr deemed it "a lot better than it should be," while criticizing its "smugness" and abundance of toilet humor. In contrast, Andrew Schenker of Slate Magazine felt that "MacGruber's at its best when it's most vulgar, when its foul-mouthed and essentially insane hero is free to indulge in his signature bits of raunchy whimsy."

A. O. Scott of The New York Times called it "a film that poses a philosophical question fundamental to our inquiry here, namely: 'Why does this exist?'" Andrew Pulver of The Guardian was similarly negative, commenting, "Only the merest hint of amusement is to be found in this uninspired latest effusion from the conveyor belt that is Saturday Night Live." Entertainment Weekly's Lisa Schwarzbaum called it a "naughty throwaway in all senses of the word throwaway-90 minutes of talented performers doing and saying dumb, crude stuff in pursuit of an elusive laugh."

Chris Tilly of IGN UK gave it 3 out of 5 stars saying "When the film is funny, it's very funny." Jon Peters of KillerFilm gave it 3 out of 5 stars saying "It's consistently funny and it didn't need gray tape to do it. It's funny in the old Airplane! humor, mixed with a little Mel Brooks, type of way ... But none of this would work, if it wasn't for Will Forte's brilliant blend of witless charm and dumb ass heroics."

The film has since been deemed a cult classic. "MacGruber is destined to become quoted in college dorms and midnight showings for years to come," wrote Elliott Smith of the Seattle Post-Intelligencer shortly after its release. In reference to its relation to other SNL films, Scott Tobias wrote that MacGruber and the film Hot Rod "may be just as poorly received, but their rhythms are unpredictable and exciting, shocked to life by moments of anti-comedy and wacky deconstruction. Hardcore comedy devotees pick up on them like a dog whistle." Matt Singer, in a retrospective review for The Dissolve, deemed it a "cult favorite in the making," remarking, "MacGruber stands out by defying every rational commercial impulse. ... Whatever your personal opinion of it, it's hard to dispute that Taccone's direction, Forte's performance, a wildly unpredictable script, and a general go-for-broke attitude all make MacGruber unique." Filmmaker Christopher Nolan is a big fan of MacGruber, and has said "there are a couple of moments in that film that had [me] howling uncontrollably." Forte has said he regrets a gay panic joke in the film.

== Future ==
=== Potential sequel ===
After an off-hand mention by Taccone in an interview in 2012, Forte dismissed rumors of a sequel, commenting, "We jokingly talk about the sequel all the time. But I don't think anybody in their right mind would give us any money for it." The following year, he told Entertainment Weekly that Taccone had mentioned creating a Kickstarter to financially support a sequel, saying, "We are going to make MacGruber 2 for sure. Whether we have to do it with a video camera in our backyards – there will be some form of MacGruber 2." The film's writing team at one point convened to produce a loosely completed outline, but the trio have since been too busy to complete a script. In 2015, Forte said the team has a "realistic shot" at producing the film, and it is his second priority behind his comedy series, The Last Man on Earth.

=== TV series ===
Forte discussed a MacGruber TV series in a March 2019 IndieWire article, saying, "The state of MacGruber right now is, we're trying to see if somebody will let us make it as a TV series... We have a really fun idea. We actually went out and pitched it a couple weeks ago." On January 16, 2020, it was announced the TV series is in the works and will be released on the streaming service Peacock. On August 10, 2020, Peacock gave production a series order consisting of eight episodes, with Forte reprising his role. In June 2021, It was reported that Sam Elliott, playing MacGruber's Dad; Laurence Fishburne, playing a military general; and Mickey Rourke, playing an enemy of MacGruber, all would be joining the cast. however, Rourke left the series, and was replaced by Billy Zane.

The series was released on Peacock on December 16, 2021.
