= Will Forte =

American actor and comedian (born 1970)

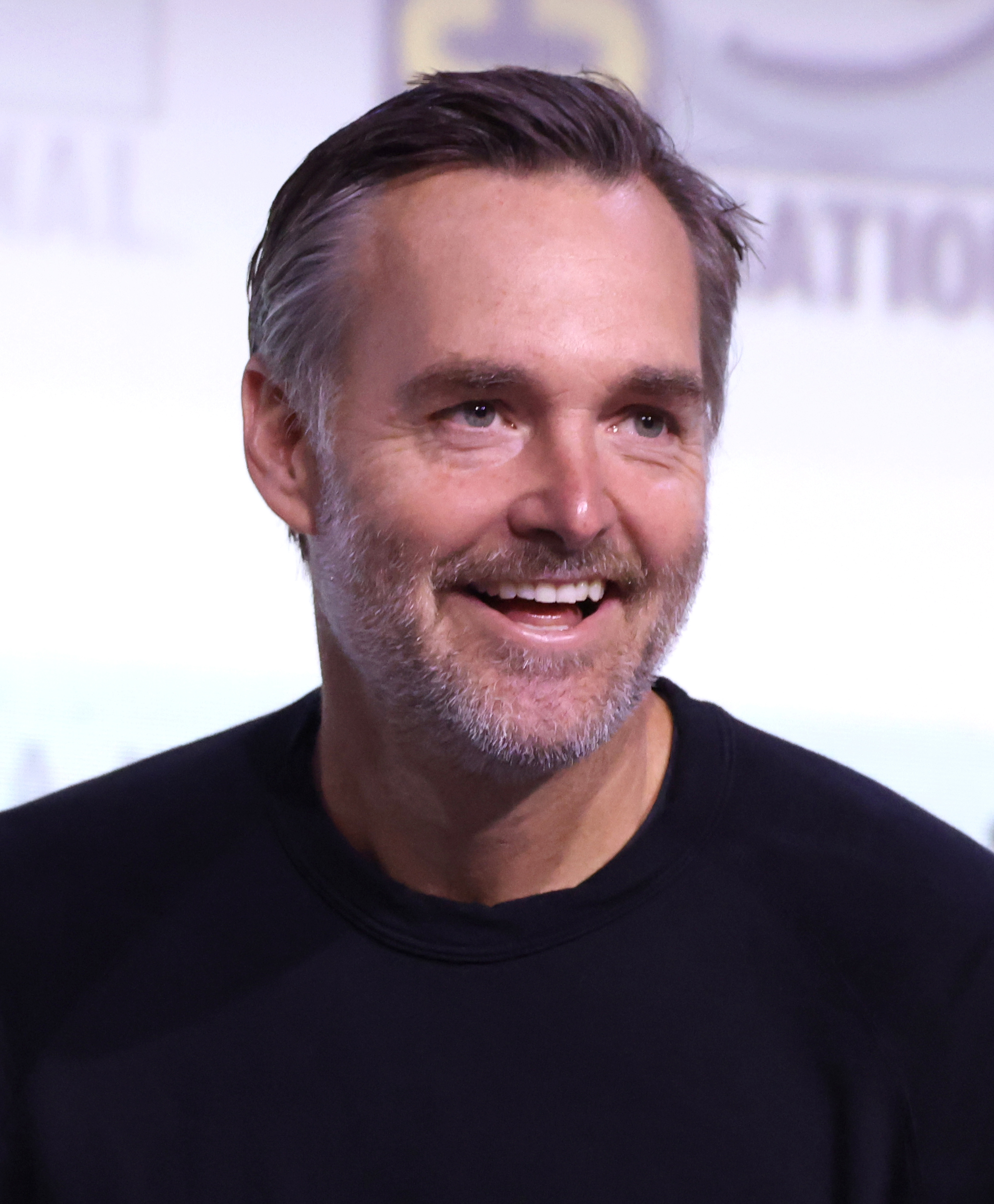
- Forte at the 2025 San Diego Comic-Con
- Born: Orville Willis Forte IV; June 17, 1970 (age 56); Alameda, California, U.S.
- Education: University of California, Los Angeles (BA)
- Occupations: Actor; comedian; writer; producer
- Years active: 1991–present
- Spouse: Olivia Modling (m. 2021)
- Children: 2

Orville Willis Forte IV (/ˈfɔːrteɪ/ FOR-tay; born June 17, 1970) is an American actor, comedian, writer, and producer. He was a cast member and writer on the NBC sketch comedy series Saturday Night Live for eight seasons from 2002 to 2010. His most famous recurring character was a parody of MacGyver named MacGruber; he reprised that role in the film adaptation, MacGruber (2010); and the limited series of the same name in 2021.

Forte also created and starred in the sitcom The Last Man on Earth (2015–2018). For the series, he received three Primetime Emmy Award nominations: two for acting and one for writing. He played various roles in comedy films, before starring in the drama film Nebraska (2013). Forte has also voiced characters in numerous animated productions, including the Cloudy with a Chance of Meatballs films, Abraham Lincoln in Clone High and the Lego Movie franchise, and Shaggy Rogers in Scoob! (2020).

== Early life ==
Orville Willis Forte IV was born on June 17, 1970, in Alameda, California, a city in the San Francisco Bay Area. His mother, Patricia, is an artist and former schoolteacher; his father, Orville Willis, "Reb" Forte III, was a financial broker. He is of Italian and Irish descent. Forte grew up in Moraga before the family moved to Lafayette when he was 13. He went by "Billy" in his early years until he was teased at school for it also being a girl's name. At that point, he chose to be known as "Will." Forte described himself as having been a "really happy little boy", whose parents were "wonderful" and created a "very loving environment." He was interested in comedy from a young age, growing up idolizing comedians Peter Sellers, David Letterman, and Steve Martin as well as the sketch-comedy television series Saturday Night Live. He often pulled pranks on his parents, and would record himself performing imaginary radio shows. He did not aim to be a comedian, but initially wanted to become a football player.

Forte was "a laid-back teen with a lot of friends." He was a member of the varsity football and swim teams at Acalanes High School in Lafayette, where he graduated in 1988. He served as freshman class president and was voted "Best Personality" by his graduating class. He had no ambitions for a television or film career, though his mother noticed a "creative streak" in him.

After high school, he attended the University of California, Los Angeles, where he was a member of the Lambda Chi Alpha fraternity and completed a degree in history. Forte wanted to become a financial broker like his father at Smith Barney Shearson, but felt "miserable" there. During that period, he co-wrote a feature-length script. Later he said that he discovered he loved writing "more than anything [he] had ever done in [his] life". During his time as an undergraduate, he had been encouraged to attempt comedy; he decided to change his career to do so.

== Career ==
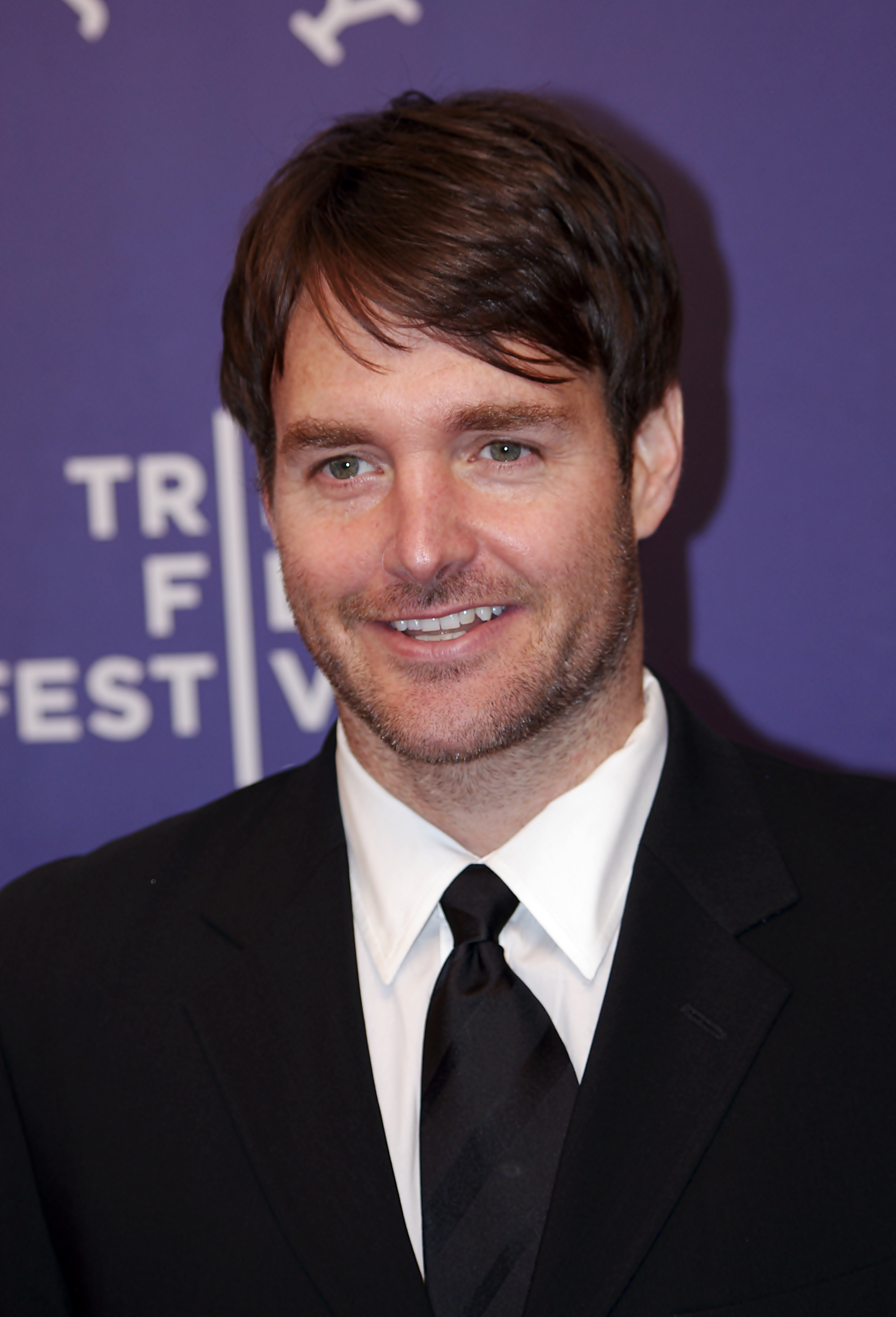
Forte at the 2011 Tribeca Festival in Manhattan, New York

Forte began taking classes at The Groundlings in Los Angeles, an improvisational and sketch comedy troupe and school, while tutoring children to make ends meet. His first successful foray into comedy was 101 Things to Definitely Not Do If You Want to Get a Chick, a comic book he produced about incompetent men. The comics landed him his first professional job writing for The Jenny McCarthy Show, a short-lived variety show starring Jenny McCarthy. Shortly thereafter, he was asked to submit a packet to the Late Show with David Letterman and was told Letterman responded favorably to animation. After only nine months at Letterman, he was "let go" from the job. He recalled his stint on the program as unpleasant, noting that he did not have enough experience in writing. "What an honor to work at that show but I don't think I was fully mentally prepared. [...] I always wonder what it would be like if I'd had a couple more years of experience before going there."

Forte left New York and returned to Los Angeles, where he began performing with the Groundlings' Main Company, with Cheryl Hines, Jim Rash, and Maya Rudolph. He tried stand-up comedy three times, mostly at open mic nights, but quit after being voted into the Main Company. He joined the writing teams of two failed sitcoms, including The Army Show and Action. Forte got jobs writing for 3rd Rock from the Sun and That '70s Show. He loved writing and had mostly given up on acting, aside from acting with the Groundlings. While performing with the troupe in 2001, he was spotted by Lorne Michaels, the creator of Saturday Night Live (SNL). Forte felt his confidence was higher than usual, as That '70s Show had been picked up for two more years. He was invited to audition for SNL, which he regarded as unexpected.

At his audition for SNL, he performed multiple original characters, including Tim Calhoun, a speed reader, a prison guard, in addition to impressions of singer Michael McDonald and actor Martin Sheen. His final character was an older piece from his days with the Groundlings, in which he portrays a gold-painted street performer who performs fellatio to pay for his face paint, which devolves into a song needlessly uttering the words "cock" and "face paint" dozens of times. He felt his time to shine as a performer was already over, as he was in his thirties when he auditioned. To his surprise, he was offered a chance to be on the show, but declined, opting instead for the financial stability of his work at That '70s Show. He felt working for SNL could not live up to the idealized version he had dreamed of, but he later realized he would be making a mistake.

After Will Ferrell left Saturday Night Live the following spring, Forte joined the cast, premiering at the beginning of the show's twenty-eighth season in the autumn. He was promoted to repertory player after his first year. His early years on the program were characterized by stage fright and an inability to properly interpret sketches that he did not write himself. He had to "re-learn" how to perform after years as a writer, and later felt his natural tendency to "overthink" things improved his performance. He was particularly uncomfortable portraying President George W. Bush, as he felt he was not the best impressionist and it paled in comparison to Ferrell's impersonation of Bush. His only role was often Bush, leaving him no chance for more "absurd" pieces he favored. He was nearly fired from the program following his third season (2004–05), but after two three-week extensions to decide his fate, he was brought back. Forte estimated it took five seasons for him to feel fully comfortable performing on the show. He made his film debut in Around the World in 80 Days.

"I've always liked weirder stuff. My main thing on SNL was that I was never gonna change my sensibility to get on TV—I was just gonna write what I liked writing and hopefully have a hit on that show somewhere."

— Forte on his tenure at SNL

His humor at SNL has been described as bizarre, and he became known for many "10-to-1" sketches—pieces that were considered odd, placed at the very end of the show. He was also well known for his characters Tim Calhoun, Greg Stink, and the Falconer. Forte's favorite sketch on the show was one in which he played a motivational coach alongside football star Peyton Manning. He also co-starred with Andy Samberg in the first SNL Digital Short, "Lettuce". He often spent long hours crafting his sketches for the program, missing deadlines, but his pieces were usually received warmly at table reads. During his time at the show, he co-starred in and wrote the 2007 film The Brothers Solomon. The film was originally a pilot for Carsey-Werner, and its creation was an extension of his agreement to terminate his contract to appear on SNL.

Forte's best-known character on SNL was MacGruber, a special operations agent who is tasked in each episode with deactivating a ticking bomb but becomes distracted by personal issues. The sketches were based on the television series MacGyver. It was created by writer Jorma Taccone, who relentlessly pitched the idea to Forte. He was initially reluctant to commit to the sketch, deeming it too dumb, but accepted after persuasion from Taccone. The first sketch aired in January 2007, and led to multiple more segments in the following years. In 2009, the sketches were spun off into a series of commercials sponsored by Pepsi premiering during Super Bowl XLIII which featured the actor behind MacGyver, Richard Dean Anderson, as MacGruber's father. The advertisements led the character and sketches to receive a wider level of popularity. After the success of the advertisements, creator Lorne Michaels approached Forte, Taccone, and writer John Solomon with the idea to produce a MacGruber film.

Regarding his experiences on SNL, Forte remarked, "Looking back, the experience is something I'll never forget. I still miss it, and I'll always miss it. That's my family." His celebrity impressions included George W. Bush, Tom DeLay, John Edwards, Timothy Geithner, Newt Gingrich, Chad Lowe, Zell Miller, David Petraeus, Harry Reid, Brian Williams, and Hu Jintao.

In the summer of 2009, MacGruber was shot on a tight schedule for four weeks in Albuquerque, New Mexico. It was written while simultaneously producing the weekly episode of SNL, and the show's production process left the trio deprived of sleep. Forte was positive regarding the film, saying,

What you see with this movie is exactly what we wanted to do. It's the three of us having a bunch of fun writing it, then having fun making it with a bunch of our friends—old friends and new friends. I think that fun comes across when you watch it. It's rare that you get that kind of creative freedom.

The film was released in May 2010 and received mixed reviews. It fared worse at the box office, where it failed to recoup its budget and was pulled from theaters after its third week. Forte found the failure tolerable, commenting, "When you make something that you're really proud of and it doesn't do well, you can live with it." The film has since seen more of a positive reception and has been dubbed a cult classic.

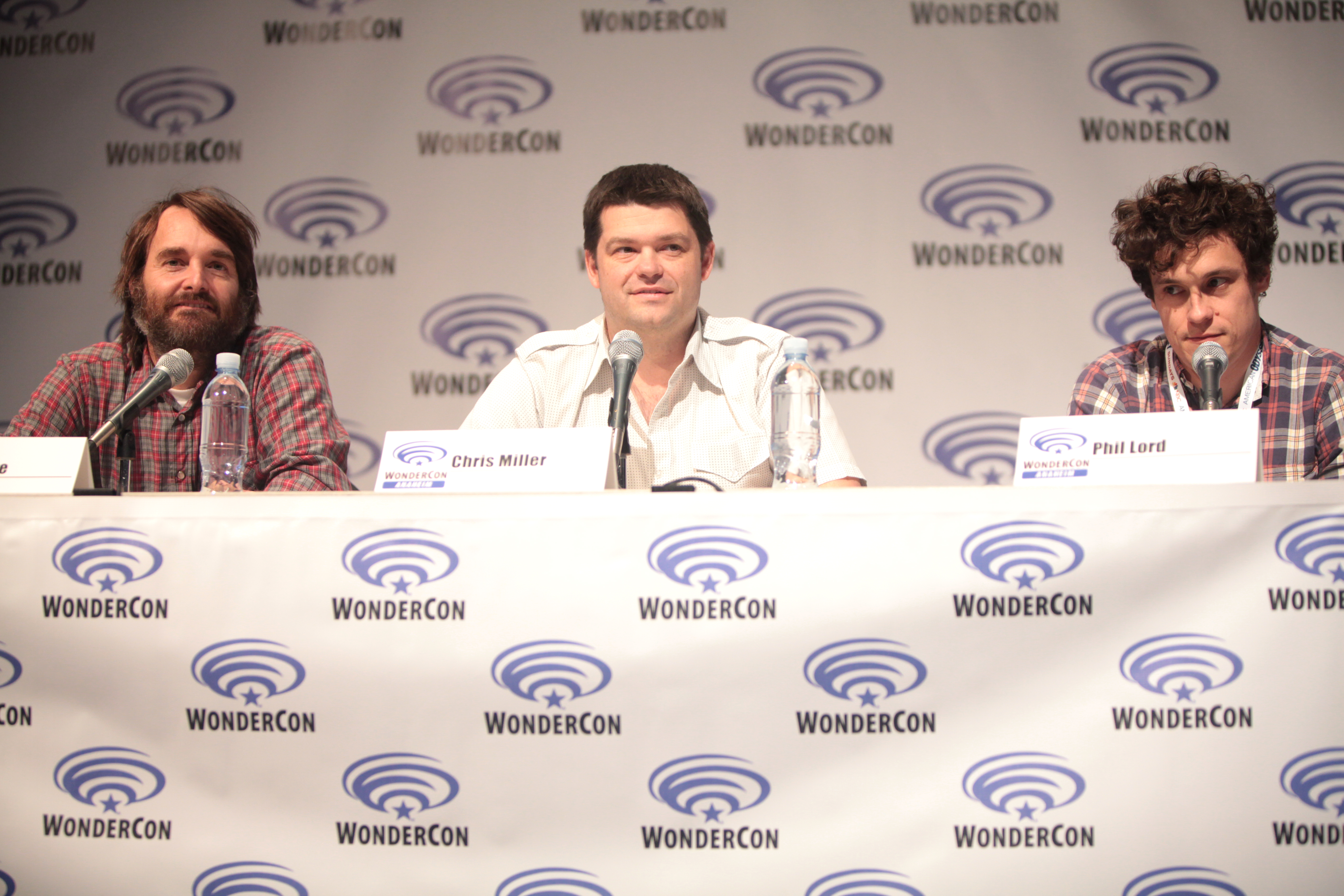
Forte alongside Phil Lord and Christopher Miller at WonderCon 2015

Forte left Saturday Night Live shortly before the beginning of the show's thirty-sixth season in 2010. He felt it was the "right time to go", considering his eight-year tenure there, his expansion into film with MacGruber, and his age. In addition, his sister had just had children and he wanted to move to the West Coast to be closer to them. He soon regretted the decision, calling the following year an "emotionally trying period", as he felt "devastated" that he would no longer be on the program. He assumed his shot at a film career was ruined, and he imagined that if acting did not work out, he would return to mostly writing. Afterwards he entered what he has called a "lost period" and had small supporting roles, such as Rock of Ages, That's My Boy, and The Watch, none of which were successes. The only commercial successful film which he worked on was Grown Ups 2, where he made a cameo as a male cheerleader. He also took a role as Paul L'astnamé, the cross-dressing boyfriend of Jenna Maroney on the critically acclaimed sitcom 30 Rock.

Forte took his first dramatic role for the 2013 film Run & Jump. Director Steph Green offered him the part, and Forte imagined it a "fun thing to try", though he noted that she had more confidence in him than he had himself. Later, he sent an audition tape to Alexander Payne for a role in his next film, Nebraska. He equated his casting in the film to his fear of joining SNL a decade prior, noting that he was "terrified" to begin working on it. He felt scared initially, but followed Bruce Dern's acting advice to "look for the truth" in each scene—in other words, "In every scene, you're just trying to play it as honestly and as real as you can."

Forte began working on The Last Man on Earth, a sitcom, with longtime collaborators Phil Lord and Christopher Miller in 2013. Though it was the duo's idea, Forte attached himself to the concept, crafting a treatment over a weekend. The series was pitched around Hollywood to positive responses and was picked up in 2014 by Fox. Forte served as the series' creator, a writer, the lead role, and showrunner for the first season. He felt odd being in charge of its writing team (composed of longtime friends), and awkward at delegating tasks, so much so that he would end up doing the work himself. Being a showrunner "truly was an amount of work I never knew existed," he said, which involved him working a "minimum of 12 hours" daily. The series premiered in 2015 to positive responses, and was renewed for three further seasons.

In 2016, Forte played Hulka, a low-level weed dealer, in the comedy Keanu, starring Jordan Peele and Keegan-Michael Key. In 2018, he played National Lampoon magazine co-founder Douglas Kenney in the Netflix biographical film A Futile and Stupid Gesture. The film was directed by David Wain and features Domhnall Gleeson as co-founder Henry Beard. Forte voiced Shaggy Rogers in the Scooby-Doo film Scoob!. In 2021, Forte starred in Sweet Tooth, reprised his role as MacGruber in a TV series on Peacock, and began voicing Wolf Tobin in the animated sitcom The Great North. In 2022, it was announced that Forte had a leading role for Disney and Pixar's first animated television series Win or Lose. It premiered on Disney+ in 2025. He voiced an older version of the titular character in Scott Pilgrim Takes Off. In 2024, Forte was announced in the main role of Martin in Sunny Nights.

== Personal life ==
Forte dated his Last Man on Earth co-star January Jones in 2015. He and Olivia Modling met in 2018 and started seeing each other. They became engaged in 2019. They have two daughters, Zoe Douglas Forte, born February 15, 2021, and Cecilia, born approximately 18 months later. He and Modling married on 31 July 2021 "in the back of Jorma Taccone's house" in New Mexico. They lived in a modestly sized Craftsman home in Santa Monica, California. Forte had bought the house in 2002, two weeks before joining the cast of Saturday Night Live. That action required him to move to New York City but he kept the house. He admitted later that "it was not the greatest timing."

Forte's mother, Patricia, has visited every film set on which he has worked. She made an appearance on a Mother's Day episode of SNL, in which he sang a song to her on Weekend Update. Forte officiated his sister Michelle's wedding; he also filmed the births of his niece and nephew.

Forte has discussed and joked about his OCD tendencies. He recounted listening to only one song in his office at SNL for an entire year because he wanted to challenge himself. During an interview with Larry King, he discussed his OCD as a challenge he had to overcome but not one he wished he did not have, as it is a part of his personality. In a February 2015 article on Grantland, the writer of the article said that Forte mentioned OCD often but it was not clear if he had ever been formally diagnosed. Forte related how he and a former girlfriend had answered an OCD questionnaire based on his typical actions; it concluded that Forte "should immediately talk to someone about this." In a 2026 episode of the podcast Family Trips with the Meyers Brothers hosted by Seth and Josh Meyers, Forte discussed how he had recently received a formal diagnosis of OCD.

Forte is an avid gamer. While filming A Good Old-Fashioned Orgy, he achieved one of the world's highest scores on the arcade version of Donkey Kong.

== Filmography ==
=== Film ===
Key
†	Denotes works that have not yet been released

Year	Title	Role	Notes
2004	Around the World in 80 Days	Young Bobby	
2006	Beerfest	Otto	
2007	The Brothers Solomon	Dean Solomon	Also writer
2007	Dry-Cleaner	Stefan Gucci	Short film
2008	Baby Mama	Scott	
2009	The Slammin' Salmon	Horace the Lone Diner	Cameo
2009	Brief Interviews with Hideous Men	Subject #72	
2009	Fanboys	THX Security Guard #4	
2009	Cloudy with a Chance of Meatballs	Joe Towne (voice)	
2010	MacGruber	MacGruber	Also writer
2011	A Good Old Fashioned Orgy	Glenn	
2012	Tim and Eric's Billion Dollar Movie	Allen Bishopman	
2012	Rock of Ages	Mitch Miley	
2012	That's My Boy	Phil	
2012	The Watch	Sergeant Bressman	
2013	Grown Ups 2	Male Cheerleader	Uncredited cameo
2013	Run & Jump	Ted	
2013	Cloudy with a Chance of Meatballs 2	Chester V (voice)	
2013	Life of Crime	Marshall Taylor	
2013	Nebraska	David Grant	
2014	The Lego Movie	Abraham Lincoln (voice)	
2014	22 Jump Street	Football Announcer (voice)	Uncredited
2014	Michelangelo and Lincoln: History Cops	Abraham Lincoln (voice)	Short film
2014	She's Funny That Way	Joshua Fleet	
2015	Don Verdean	Pastor Fontaine	
2015	Staten Island Summer	Griffith	
2015	The Ridiculous 6	Will Patch	
2015	Get Squirrely	Cody (voice)	
2016	Keanu	Hulka	
2016	Popstar: Never Stop Never Stopping	Bagpipe Player	Cameo
2017	My Life as a Courgette	Mr. Paul (voice)	English dub
2018	A Futile and Stupid Gesture	Doug Kenney	
2018	Luis and the Aliens	Nag (voice)	English dub
2019	The Lego Movie 2: The Second Part	Abraham Lincoln (voice)	
2019	Extra Ordinary	Christian Winter	
2019	Booksmart	Doug Antsler	
2019	Good Boys	Andrew Newman (Max's Dad)	
2019	The Laundromat	Doomed Gringo #1	
2020	The Willoughbys	Tim Willoughby (voice)	
2020	Have a Good Trip: Adventures in Psychedelics	Himself	Documentary
2020	Scoob!	Shaggy Rogers (voice)	
2020	Drunk Bus	Fred	Uncredited
2021	America: The Motion Picture	Abraham Lincoln (voice)	
2022	Studio 666	Restaurant Delivery Guy (Darren Sandelbaum)	
2022	Weird: The Al Yankovic Story	Ben Scotti	
2023	Ruby Gillman, Teenage Kraken	Captain Gordon Lighthouse (voice)	
2023	Strays	Doug	
2024	Thelma the Unicorn	Otis (voice)	
2025	Kinda Pregnant	Josh Lewis	
2026	The Breadwinner	Keegan Jonas	
2026	Coyote vs. Acme	Kevin Avery	Filmed in 2023

=== Television ===
Year	Title	Role	Notes
1997	Late Show with David Letterman	Snow Shovel Murder Victim (uncredited)	Episode: "Robert Pastorelli/Craig Kilborn/Live"; also writer
2002–2010	Saturday Night Live	Various roles	157 episodes
2002–2003, 2022–2024	Clone High	Abe Lincoln (voice)	33 episodes
2006	Campus Ladies	Stuart	2 episodes
2006	Drawn Together	Kirk Cameron (voice)	Episode: "Lost in Parking Space: Part One"
2006	Aqua Teen Hunger Force	Alien (voice)	Episode: "Antenna"
2007	Flight of the Conchords	Ben	Episode: "The Actor"
2007	Tim and Eric Nite Live!	Emanuel Melly	Episode #1.5
2007, 2010–2012	30 Rock	Tomas, Paul L'astnamé	13 episodes
2007–2010	Tim and Eric Awesome Show, Great Job!	Various roles	6 episodes
2008	Young Person's Guide to History	Comte de Buffon the Frenchman	Episode #1.1
2008, 2010	How I Met Your Mother	Randy Wharmpess	2 episodes
2009	Sit Down, Shut Up	Stuart Proszakian (voice)	13 episodes
2009–2013	The Cleveland Show	Principal Wally Farquhare, Various voices	22 episodes
2009–2025	American Dad!	Various voices	8 episodes
2010	The Life & Times of Tim	Chipper (voice)	Episode: "Unjustly Neglected Drama"
2010	WWE Raw	MacGruber	1 episode
2010	Funny or Die Presents	Cast (Scott & Behr), Sleeping Celebrity	2 episodes
2010	Squidbillies	Tom Treebow (voice)	Episode: "Lean Green Touchdown Makifying Machine"
2010–2013	Conan	Ted Turner	14 episodes
2011	Parks and Recreation	Kelly Larson	Episode: "Time Capsule"
2011	Allen Gregory	Ian, Stuart Rossmyre, Sid Lampis (voice)	7 episodes
2011–2012	Up All Night	Reed	3 episodes
2011–2012	Kick Buttowski: Suburban Daredevil	Gordon "Gordie" Gibble (voice)	7 episodes
2011–2015	The League	Chuck	2 episodes
2012–2013	Comedy Bang! Bang!	Chet Barnsider, Felix Dewhurst	2 episodes
2012–2015	Lab Rats	Eddy (voice), Human Eddy	20 episodes
2012–2016	Gravity Falls	Tyler Cutebiker (voice)	13 episodes
2013	Drunk History	Edwin Booth	Episode: "Washington D.C."
2013–2014	Kroll Show	Various roles	3 episodes
2013–2024	Bob's Burgers	Kurt, Mr. Grant (voice)	9 episodes
2014–2015	The Awesomes	Malocchio Jr. (voice)	10 episodes
2014–2022	The Simpsons	King Toot (voice)	3 episodes
2015	7 Days in Hell	Sandy Pickard	Television film
2015	Moonbeam City	Rad Cunningham (voice)	10 episodes
2015–2018	The Last Man on Earth	Philip Tandy "Phil" Miller	65 episodes; also creator, writer and executive producer
2016	Maya & Marty	Various	Episode: "Will Forte, Amy Poehler and Jerry Seinfeld"
2017	Michael Bolton's Big, Sexy Valentine's Day Special	Michael Fulton	Variety special
2017	Tour de Pharmacy	Police Officer	Television film
2017	Tim and Eric's Bedtime Stories	Will	Episode: "The Demotion"
2019	Future Man	CASSIN-E (voice)	Episode: "The I of the Tiger"
2019	Alien News Desk	Drexx Drudlarr (voice)	12 episodes
2019	Crank Yankers	Himself (voice)	2 episodes
2019, 2023	I Think You Should Leave with Tim Robinson	Old Man on Plane / The Ponytail Guy	2 episodes
2020	Who Wants to Be a Millionaire	Himself	Contestant; 2 episodes
2020	The Shivering Truth	(voice)	Episode: "Holeways"
2020	Flipped	Jann Melfi	11 episodes
2020	Hoops	Dawa (voice)	Episode: "Zen"
2020–2022	Late Night with Seth Meyers	Sea Captain (voice)	Uncredited
2021	No Activity	Dirk (voice)	7 episodes
2021	Chicago Party Aunt	(voice)	Episode: "Emergency Contact"
2021	MacGruber	MacGruber	Main role; executive producer
2021–2024	Sweet Tooth	Pubba	4 episodes
2021–2025	The Great North	Wolf Tobin (voice)	Main role; 97 episodes
2021–2023	HouseBroken	Shel (voice)	Main role
2022	Saturday Night Live	Himself (host)	Episode: "Will Forte/Måneskin"
2022	The Afterparty	Himself	3 episodes
2022, 2025	Studio C	Himself	2 episodes
2022	The Kids in the Hall	Aaron	Episode 4
2022	Rick and Morty	Eugene Piss, Pissmaster (voice)	Episode: "Analyze Piss"
2023	Scott Pilgrim Takes Off	Old Scott Pilgrim (voice)	2 episodes
2023	Krapopolis	Pants Guy (voice)	Episode: "Dungeons and Deliria"
2024	Bodkin	Gilbert Power	Main role
2024	That '90s Show	Kiefer	Episode: "I Can See Clearly Now"
2024	Gremlins: The Wild Batch	Warden of Alcatraz (voice)	2 episodes
2024–2025	Sausage Party: Foodtopia	Jack (voice)	Main role
2025	Win or Lose	Coach Dan (voice)	Main cast
2025–present	The Four Seasons	Jack	Main role
2025–present	Haunted Hotel	Nathan (voice)	Main role
2025	Sunny Nights	Martin	Main role
2026	The Boys	Himself	Episode: "One-Shots"

=== Music videos ===
Year	Title	Artist	Ref.
2013	"Hopeless Wanderer"	Mumford & Sons	
2022	"Past Life"	Arkells	

=== Video games ===
Year	Title	Voice role
2009	Grand Theft Auto IV: The Lost and Damned	Martin Serious

=== Web ===
Year	Title	Role	Notes
2014	Kevin Pollak's Chat Show	Himself/Guest	Episode: "210"
2025	The Chit Show	Chit's Dad	Ep. 37 THE FINALE
2025	Small Town Murder	Himself/Guest	Episode Lawnmower Man

== Crew work ==
Year	Title	Position
1997	The Jenny McCarthy Show	Writer
1997–1998	Late Show with David Letterman	Writer
1998	The Army Show	Writer
1999–2000	Action	Writer
1999–2001	3rd Rock from the Sun	Writer
2000	God, the Devil and Bob	Writer
2001–2003	That '70s Show	Writer and producer
2007	The Brothers Solomon	Writer
2008	Extreme Movie	Writer
2010	MacGruber	Writer
2015–2018	The Last Man on Earth	Creator, writer and executive producer
2019	Alien News Desk	Consulting producer

== Awards and nominations ==
Year	Award	Category	Title	Result
1998	Primetime Emmy Award	Outstanding Writing for a Variety Series	Late Show with David Letterman	Nominated
2013	Primetime Emmy Award	Outstanding Guest Actor in a Comedy Series	30 Rock: "My Whole Life Is Thunder"	Nominated
2013	Golden Raspberry Award	Worst Screen Ensemble (shared with the entire cast)	That's My Boy	Nominated
2013	St. Louis Gateway Film Critics Association Award	Best Supporting Actor	Nebraska	Runner-up
2013	San Francisco Film Critics Circle Award	Best Supporting Actor	Nebraska	Nominated
2013	National Board of Review Award	Best Supporting Actor	Nebraska	Won
2013	Village Voice Film Poll Award	Best Supporting Actor	Nebraska	Nominated
2014	American Comedy Award	Supporting Comedy Actor - Film	Nebraska	Nominated
2014	Independent Spirit Award	Best Supporting Male	Nebraska	Nominated
2015	Critics' Choice Television Award	Best Actor in a Comedy Series	The Last Man on Earth	Nominated
2015	Primetime Emmy Award	Outstanding Writing in a Comedy Series	The Last Man on Earth	Nominated
2015	Primetime Emmy Award	Outstanding Lead Actor in a Comedy Series	The Last Man on Earth	Nominated
2016	Critics' Choice Television Award	Best Actor in a Comedy Series	The Last Man on Earth	Nominated
2016	Satellite Award	Best Actor – Television Series Musical or Comedy	The Last Man on Earth	Nominated
2016	Primetime Emmy Award	Outstanding Lead Actor in a Comedy Series	The Last Man on Earth	Nominated
2021	Critics' Choice Super Award	Best Voice Actor in an Animated Movie	The Willoughbys	Nominated

Preceded by Matthew Lillard	Voice of Norville "Shaggy" Rogers; 2020 film Scoob!	Succeeded by Iain Armitage (2020)
