= John Solomon (writer) =

American comedian and writer

John Solomon (born May 23, 1970) is an American comedian and writer.

== Biography ==
Solomon was born in Omaha, Nebraska, but grew up in Huntington Beach, California. He started his comedy career as an improv comedy performer at The Groundlings in Los Angeles.

Solomon wrote for Saturday Night Live from 2006 to 2014, serving as co-writing supervisor in his final season. He is the writing partner of comedian Will Forte, collaborating on the screenplay for MacGruber, and working together on Extreme Movie. He was a director, writer and producer for the television series The Last Man on Earth.
