= The Ladies Man (2000 film) =

2000 film by Reginald Hudlin

- Theatrical poster
- Directed by: Reginald Hudlin
- Written by: Tim Meadows; Dennis McNicholas; Harper Steele (Note: Credited as Andrew Steele; Steele came out as transgender and changed her name in 2022.)
- Produced by: Lorne Michaels
- Starring: Tim Meadows; Karyn Parsons; Billy Dee Williams; Tiffani Thiessen; Lee Evans; Will Ferrell
- Cinematography: Johnny E. Jensen
- Edited by: Earl Watson
- Music by: Marcus Miller
- Production companies: SNL Studios; Broadway Video
- Distributed by: Paramount Pictures
- Release date: October 13, 2000
- Running time: 84 minutes
- Country: United States
- Language: English
- Budget: $24 million
- Box office: $13.7 million

The Ladies Man is a 2000 American sex comedy film directed by Reginald Hudlin. The film stars Tim Meadows, who also wrote the film along with Dennis McNicholas and Harper Steele. The film focuses on the exploits of radio host and sex therapy expert Leon Phelps, a recurring character Meadows originally played on Saturday Night Live.

The Ladies Man was released by Paramount Pictures on October 13, 2000. The film received negative reviews from critics and was a box office bomb, grossing $13.7 million against a $24 million budget.

== Plot ==
Leon Phelps (also known as the "Ladies Man") was a Saturday Night Live character played by Tim Meadows during the 1990s. The sketch was that of a broadcast program in which Phelps, a young, suave black man, would give dubious romantic advice and sex tips. The Ladies Man openly proclaimed that he would court any woman at all including skanks, providing the woman weighs no more than 250 pounds. A night of romance would generally revolve around a bottle of Courvoisier.

After finally going too far during a broadcast, Leon is fired, but he receives a note from one of his former flames who wants him to come back to her—and is willing to support him in high style. This sounds just fine with Leon, except that the woman didn't sign her name, and now Leon has to backtrack through his numerous conquests of the past and figure out who wants him to work his love magic. Meanwhile, a secret group called the Victims of the Smiling Ass (V.S.A. for short), consisting of the angry husbands and boyfriends whose women have cheated with Leon, have discovered Leon as their target and are now hot on his trail, eager to get revenge.

== Cast ==
- Tim Meadows as Leon Phelps
- Karyn Parsons as Julie Simmons
- Billy Dee Williams as Lester
- Tiffani Thiessen as Honey DeLune
- Lee Evans as Barney
- Will Ferrell as Lance DeLune
- Sofia Milos as Cheryl
- Jill Talley as Candy
- John Witherspoon as Scrap Iron
- Ken Campbell as Hal
- Rocky Carroll as Cyrus Cunningham
- Tamala Jones as Theresa
- Kevin McDonald as Mail Man
- Julianne Moore as Audrey
- Eugene Levy as Bucky Kent
- David Huband as Frank
- Arnold Pinnock as V.S.A. Member
- Shaun Majumder as V.S.A. Member
- Sean Thibodeau as Hugh Hefner
- Mark McKinney as Mr. White
- Chris Parnell as Phil Swanson
- Susan Aceron as Chinese Lover
- Boyd Banks as C&W Station Manager
- Reginald Hudlin as Aloysius

== Box office ==
The film opened at number four at the North American box office making $5.4 million in its opening weekend.

== Reception ==
The Ladies Man was heavily panned by critics. Rotten Tomatoes gives the film a score of 11% based on reviews from 73 critics, with an average rating of 3.2/10. The critical consensus reads, "The Ladies Man joins the growing list of mediocre movies based on SNL skits. It just doesn't have enough material to last the length of the movie." Metacritic, which uses a weighted average, assigned the film a score of 22 out of 100, based on 23 critics, indicating "generally unfavorable" reviews. Roger Ebert gave the film 1 star out of a possible 4: "The character, with his disco suits and giant afro, is funny on TV—but then so are most of the recurring "SNL" characters; that's why the show recycles them. At feature length, Leon loses his optimistic charm and slogs through a lame-brained formula story that doesn't understand him."

== See also ==
- List of recurring Saturday Night Live characters and sketches
