= Broadway Video =

American multimedia entertainment studio

- Type: Private
- Industry: Entertainment
- Founded: 1979; 47 years ago
- Founder: Lorne Michaels
- Headquarters: Rockefeller Center, New York City, New York, United States
- Key people: Lorne Michaels (chairman); Jack Sullivan (CEO)
- Products: Television programs Motion pictures
- Number of employees: 99+
- Website: broadwayvideo.com

Broadway Video is an American multimedia entertainment studio founded in 1979 by Lorne Michaels, creator of the sketch comedy television series Saturday Night Live and producer of other television programs and movies. Broadway Video also held the rights to much of the pre-1974 Rankin-Bass library and Lassie from 1988 to 1996 before they sold the rights to Golden Books Family Entertainment (now owned by NBCUniversal/Universal Pictures via DreamWorks Animation/Classic Media).

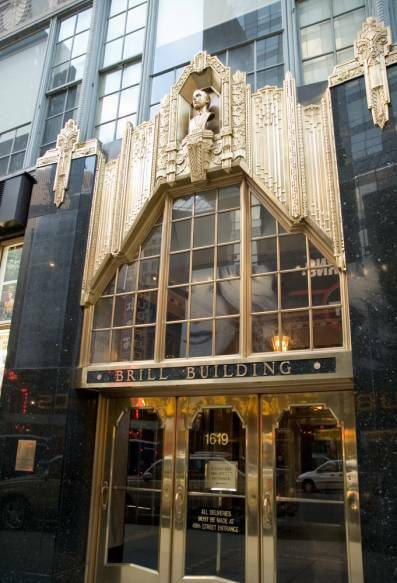
Broadway Video was founded at The Brill Building, located at 1619 Broadway.

== History ==
Lorne Michaels, who launched Saturday Night Live in 1975, produced several television specials under the banner of Above Average Productions before incorporating Broadway Video in 1979. Michaels took the company's name from its location at 1619 Broadway in the historic Brill Building in New York, New York. Initially, the company's principal activity was videotape post-production. One of its main clients was NBC, which hired Michaels to produce and edit Best of Saturday Night specials that aired in prime time. The specials and other comedy and musical projects helped Broadway Video grow "from a one-room operation into a first-class production company, the foundation of a small empire."

Broadway Video later "prospered" by moving into home entertainment, acquisition, and international syndication. With offices in New York and Los Angeles, the company has continued to develop films and TV programming. Its sitcom, 30 Rock, ran for seven seasons between 2006 and 2013. Besides SNL, its current TV productions include The Tonight Show Starring Jimmy Fallon and Late Night with Seth Meyers, The company's Above Average Productions distributes its own original digital shorts, and those of others, on one of YouTube’s leading comedy networks. Broadway Video Enterprises distributes the company's library and develops branded entertainment. Broadway Video Ventures invests in emerging technology, media, and entertainment companies. His production company signed a film deal with Universal Pictures in 2018 after its original deal with Paramount ended.

== Divisions ==
=== Broadway Video Television ===
Broadway Video Television develops and produces primetime and late night programming. Its flagship show, Saturday Night Live, where Michaels remains Executive Producer, began its 50th season in 2024. Michaels also has served as Executive Producer of NBC's Late Night franchise for more than two decades – producing Late Night with Conan O'Brien (1993–2009), Late Night with Jimmy Fallon (2009–2014), and Late Night with Seth Meyers (2014–present). In 2014, Michaels took on the role of Executive Producer of The Tonight Show Starring Jimmy Fallon. Since 2011, Broadway Video has produced Portlandia, the Peabody-winning IFC series created by Fred Armisen, Carrie Brownstein, and Jonathan Krisel. The show, which ran for eight seasons between 2011 and 2018, was distributed in 91 nations. The company's animated series, The Awesomes, created by Seth Meyers and Mike Shoemaker, premiered on Hulu in 2013 and ran for three seasons (30 episodes total) through 2015. Mulaney, which aired on Fox in the fall of 2014, starred comedian John Mulaney, It has also been involved with Man Seeking Woman, based on Last Girlfriend on Earth by Simon Rich, Documentary Now, created by Fred Armisen, Bill Hader, and Seth Meyers, and the served as the producer of The Maya Rudolph Show variety show pilot that aired on NBC on May 19, 2014.

=== Broadway Video Film ===
Michaels has developed and produced such films as Mean Girls (2004), Enigma (2001), Tommy Boy (1995), Lassie (1994), and Wayne's World (1992), among other titles. His SNL Studios productions have included The Ladies Man (2000), Superstar (1999), and A Night at the Roxbury (1998). Michaels’ co-productions with John Goldwyn include The Guilt Trip (2012), MacGruber (2010), and Baby Mama (2008). Other work includes Staten Island Summer, written by Colin Jost and directed by Rhys Thomas.

=== Above Average Productions ===
Broadway Video revived the Above Average name in June 2012, when it created a division for producing digital content. The company distributes original comedy shorts via its website, AboveAverage.com, and the Above Average network on YouTube. As of 2014, the network featured over 50 channel partners, including such comedy troupes as the Upright Citizens Brigade, The Lonely Island, Good Neighbor, POYKPAC, and BriTANicK. Its videos frequently feature current and former Saturday Night Live cast members such as Vanessa Bayer, Kristen Wiig, Jay Pharoah, Jason Sudeikis, Taran Killam, and Kate McKinnon as well as up-and-coming comedians. Among the network's most viewed web series are 7 Minutes in Heaven with Mike O'Brien and "Waco Valley," an animated series that received a pilot order from the Comedy Central network. Above Average Productions also creates promotional entertainment for client companies, including Hasbro, Fox Digital Studios, Random House, Sprint, NBC, Conde Nast Entertainment, and Nickelodeon.

In October 2015, Above Average partnered with SNL co-head writer Bryan Tucker to launch a new sports comedy brand, The Kicker. The Kicker creates original sports comedy videos, articles, images, and digital content that are similar in tone to that of Above Average.

=== Broadway Video Enterprises ===
Broadway Video Enterprises manages the distribution and licensing of Broadway Video Entertainment's properties. The company's library contains over 1,000 hours of programming including Saturday Night Live, Portlandia, The Awesomes, Above Average webisodes, The Kids in the Hall, The Best of the Blues Brothers, All You Need Is Cash, and musical performances by Neil Young, Randy Newman, and The Beach Boys. The division has syndicated episodes of "Saturday Night Live" in over 200 countries and has licensed the "SNL" format in Italy, Spain, Japan, Korea, Brazil, Russia, Canada, Mexico, France, Turkey and Germany. The SNL consumer products line offers several hundred items, including over 100 DVDs. The Enterprises division has also engineered advertising and promotions for brands such as AT&T, Verizon, Old Navy, and Jeep.

== Awards ==
Saturday Night Live has won 40 Primetime Emmy Awards and currently holds the title for most-nominated show, with 187 Emmy nominations as of July 2014. SNL has been honored twice, in 1990 and 2009, with a Peabody Award and was inducted into the Broadcasting Hall of Fame. Portlandia has won two Emmys and received six nominations, as well as a 2012 Peabody Award. 30 Rock won 16 Emmys and received 103 nominations. It also won a Peabody Award in 2007. Late Night with Conan O'Brien won one Emmy and received 28 nominations. Late Night with Jimmy Fallon won one Emmy and received six nominations. The Kids in the Hall received three Emmy nominations. Lorne Michaels’ honors include one personal Peabody Award, 13 Prime Time Emmy Awards, induction into the Television Academy of Arts and Sciences Hall of Fame, and the Mark Twain Prize for American Humor.

== Location ==
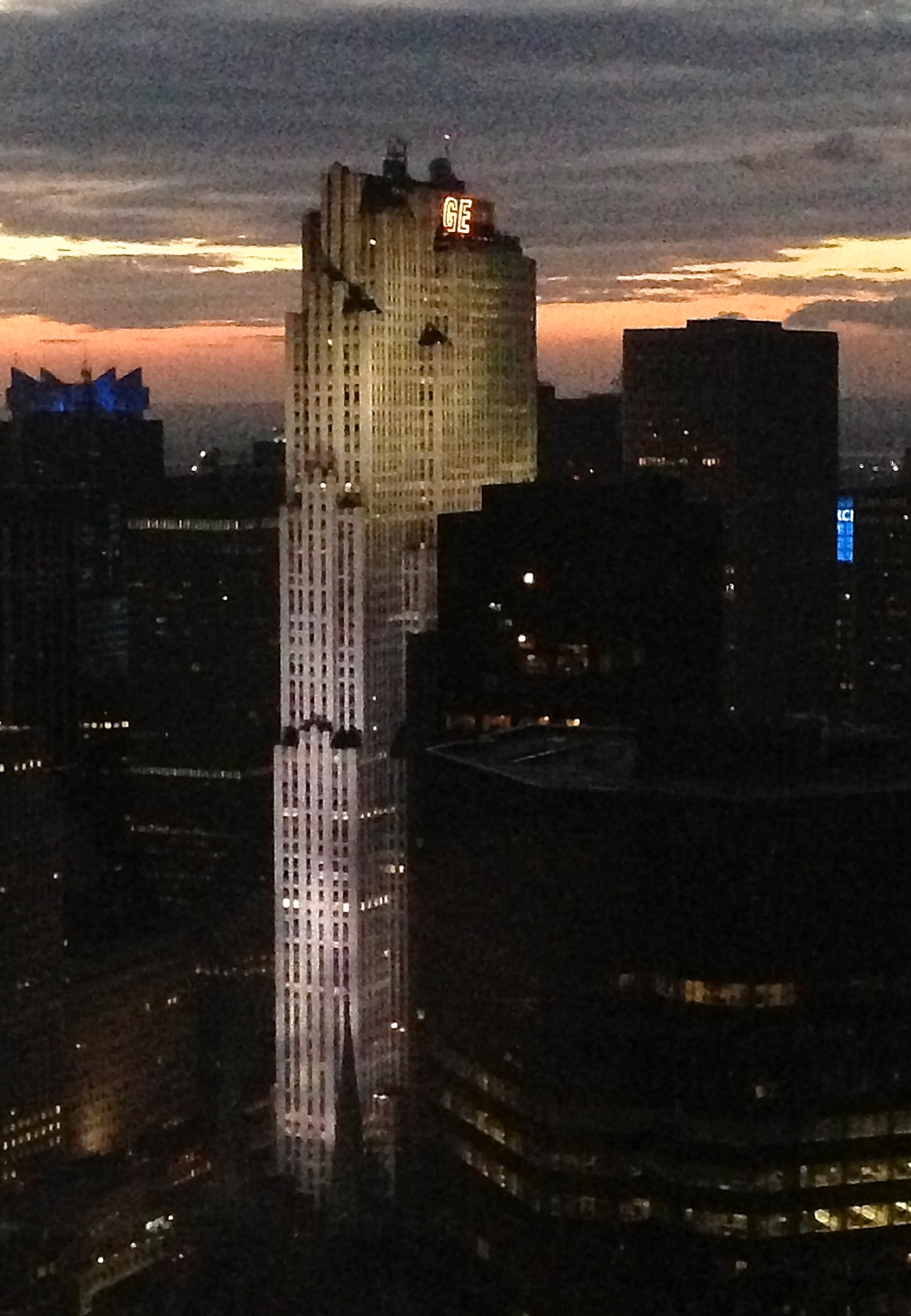
Broadway Video’s headquarters in Rockefeller Center

Broadway Video’s principal offices in New York are located in La Maison Francaise, part of the Rockefeller Center complex. Broadway Video Post-Production and Above Average Productions are based in the Brill Building, located a few blocks west in Midtown Manhattan. Principal offices in Los Angeles are located at 9401 Wilshire Boulevard in Beverly Hills, California. Broadway Video Film also has offices on the Paramount Pictures lot in Los Angeles.

== Productions ==
Below is a list of audio, film, and television projects in which Broadway Video has been involved.

=== Audio ===
Title	Artist	Release date	Role	Notes
Live From New York	Gilda Radner	1980	Production	
They're All Gonna Laugh at You!	Adam Sandler	1993	Distribution	
What the Hell Happened to Me?	Adam Sandler	1996	Distribution	
What's Your Name?	Adam Sandler	1997	Distribution	
Ridiculous	Norm Macdonald	2006	Distribution	
Incredibad	The Lonely Island	2009	Distribution	
Turtleneck and Chain	The Lonely Island	2011	Distribution	
The Wack Album	The Lonely Island	2013	Distribution	

=== Film ===
Title	Release date	Role	Notes
Gilda Live	1980	Production	
Nothing Lasts Forever	1984	Production	Produced with MGM
Three Amigos	1986	Production	Produced with L.A. Films and HBO
Wayne's World	1992	Production	Produced with Paramount Pictures
Wayne's World 2	1993	Production	Produced with Paramount Pictures
Coneheads	1993	Production	Produced with Paramount Pictures
Raffi on Broadway	1993	Video Editing	
Lassie	1994	Production	Produced with Paramount Pictures. At the time, Broadway Video owned the Lassie franchise, which is now owned by DreamWorks Classics/DreamWorks Animation (via Universal Pictures/NBCUniversal).
Tommy Boy	1995	Production	Produced with Paramount Pictures
Stuart Saves His Family	1995	Production	Produced with Paramount Pictures
Black Sheep	1996	Production	Produced with Paramount Pictures
A Night at the Roxbury	1998	Production	Produced with SNL Studios and Paramount Pictures
Superstar	1999	Production	Produced with SNL Studios and Paramount Pictures
The Ladies Man	2000	Production	Produced with SNL Studios and Paramount Pictures
Enigma	2001	Production	Produced with Jagged Films
Mean Girls	2004	Production	Produced with Paramount and M.G. Films
Hot Rod	2007	Production	Produced with Michaels-Goldwyn, Paramount, and The Lonely Island
Baby Mama	2008	Production	Produced with Universal Pictures, Michaels-Goldwyn and Relativity Media
MacGruber	2010	Production	Produced with Michaels-Goldwyn and Relativity Media
The Guilt Trip	2012	Production	Produced with Michaels-Goldwyn, Paramount, and Skydance Productions
Staten Island Summer	2015	Production	Produced with Paramount Pictures
Masterminds	2016	Production	Produced with Michaels-Goldwyn and Relativity Media
Whiskey Tango Foxtrot	2016	Production	Produced with Paramount Pictures and Little Stranger
Brother Nature	2016	Production	Produced with Paramount Pictures
Vampires vs. the Bronx	2020	Production	
Mean Girls	2024	Production	Produced with Paramount Players and Little Stranger

=== Television ===
Title	Air dates	Role	Notes
Saturday Night Live	1975–present	Production/Distribution	Series
The Paul Simon Special	1977	Production	Special, Produced by Above Average
Things We Did Last Summer	1978	Production/Distribution	Special
The Rutles: All You Need Is Cash	1978	Production/Distribution	TV movie, Produced by Above Average
Diary of a Young Comic	1979	Distribution	Special
Bob & Ray, Jane, Laraine & Gilda	1979	Production/Distribution	Special, Produced by Above Average
Mr. Mike's Mondo Video	1979	Production	Special pulled by NBC; later aired on cable and released theatrically
Steve Martin's Best Show Ever	1981	Production	Special
Simon and Garfunkel: The Concert in Central Park	1982	Production	Special
The Coneheads	1983	Production	Special; Produced with Rankin/Bass Productions and Topcraft
Randy Newman – Live at the Odeon	1983	Distribution	Special
The New Show	1984	Production	Series
Bugs Bunny/Looney Tunes All-Star 50th Anniversary	1986	Production	Special; Produced with Warner Bros. Television
Neil Young in Berlin	1986	Distribution	Special
40th Primetime Emmy Awards	1988	Production	Special
Superman 50th Anniversary	1988	Production	Special
Mr. Miller Goes to Washington Starring Dennis Miller	1988	Production	Special
Night Music	1988–1990	Production/Distribution	Series, aka Sunday Night
The Kids in the Hall	1988–1995	Production/Distribution	Series
Saturday Night Live: 15th Anniversary Special	1989	Production	Special
Paul Simon's Concert in the Park	1991	Production	Special
Frosty Returns	1992	Production/Distribution	Special, Produced with CBS and Bill Melendez. At the time, Broadway Video owned the pre-1974 Rankin/Bass Productions television library (Frosty Returns being a pseudo-sequel to Frosty the Snowman), which are now owned by DreamWorks Classics/DreamWorks Animation (via NBCUniversal), along with Frosty Returns.
The Vacant Lot	1993–1994	Production/Distribution	Series
Late Night with Conan O'Brien	1993–2009	Production	Series, Produced with Conaco
Saturday Night Live 25	1999	Production	Special
Macy's 4th of July Fireworks Spectacular	2000	Production	Special
50 Years of NBC Late Night	2001	Production	Special
Strange Frequency	2001	Production	TV movie
Strange Frequency 2	2001	Production	TV movie
Strange Frequency	2001	Production	Series
SportsCentury: The Century's Greatest Athletes	2002	Production	Series episode
The Colin Quinn Show	2002	Production	Series
Countdown to the Emmys	2002	Production	Special
NBC 75th Anniversary Special	2002	Production	Special
Night of Too Many Stars	2003	Production	Special
The Tracy Morgan Show	2003–2004	Production	Series
The Rutles 2: You Can't Buy Me Lunch	2004	Production	TV movie
Wulin Warriors	2006	Production/Distribution	Series, English dub produced with Animation Collective and Pili International Multimedia
Sons & Daughters	2006–2007	Production	Series
30 Rock	2006–2013	Production	Series
Late Night with Jimmy Fallon	2009–2014	Production	Series
Portlandia	2011–2018	Production	Series
Up All Night	2011–2012	Production	Series
The Awesomes	2013–2015	Production	Series, Produced with Sethmaker Shoemeyers Productions and Bento Box Entertainment
The Tonight Show Starring Jimmy Fallon	2014–present	Production	Series, Produced with Electric Hot Dog
Late Night with Seth Meyers	2014–present	Production	Series, Produced with Sethmaker Shoemeyers Productions
The Maya Rudolph Show	2014	Production	Variety show
Mulaney	2014–2015	Production	Series, Produced with 3 Arts Entertainment
Documentary Now!	2015–2022	Production	Series
Man Seeking Woman	2015–2017	Production	Series
Saturday Night Live 40th Anniversary Special	2015	Production	Special
Maya & Marty	2016	Production	Series
Detroiters	2017–2018	Production	Series
A.P. Bio	2018–2021	Production	Series, Produced with Sethmaker Shoemeyers Productions and Human Rabbit
The Other Two	2019–2023	Production	Series, Produced with Jax Media
Los Espookys	2019–2022	Production	Series, Produced with Antigravico
Miracle Workers	2019–2023	Production	Series, Produced with Allagash Industries, FX Productions and Studio T
Shrill	2019–2021	Production	Series, Produced with Brownstone Productions and Warner Bros. Television
Alien News Desk	2019	Production	Series, Produced with Bento Box Entertainment and Syfy
Mapleworth Murders	2020	Production	Series, Produced with Sethmaker Shoemeyers Productions, Quibi
That Damn Michael Che	2021–2022	Production	Series, Produced with Irony Point
Kenan	2021–2022	Production	Series, Produced with Shark vs. Bear Productions
Schmigadoon!	2021–2023	Production	Series
Saturday Morning All Star Hits!	2021	Production	Series, Produced with Georgia Entertainment Industries, Bento Box Entertainment and Netflix
MacGruber	2021	Production	Series
Bust Down	2022	Production	Series
The Kids in the Hall (revival)	2022	Production	Series, Produced with Amazon Studios
Bupkis	2023	Production	Series
Saturday Night Live 50th Anniversary Special	2025	Production	Special
Saturday Night Live UK	2026	Production	Series

== See also ==
- Broadway Comics
- NBC
- Universal Television
- SNL Studios
