= Laraine Newman =

American actress (born 1952)

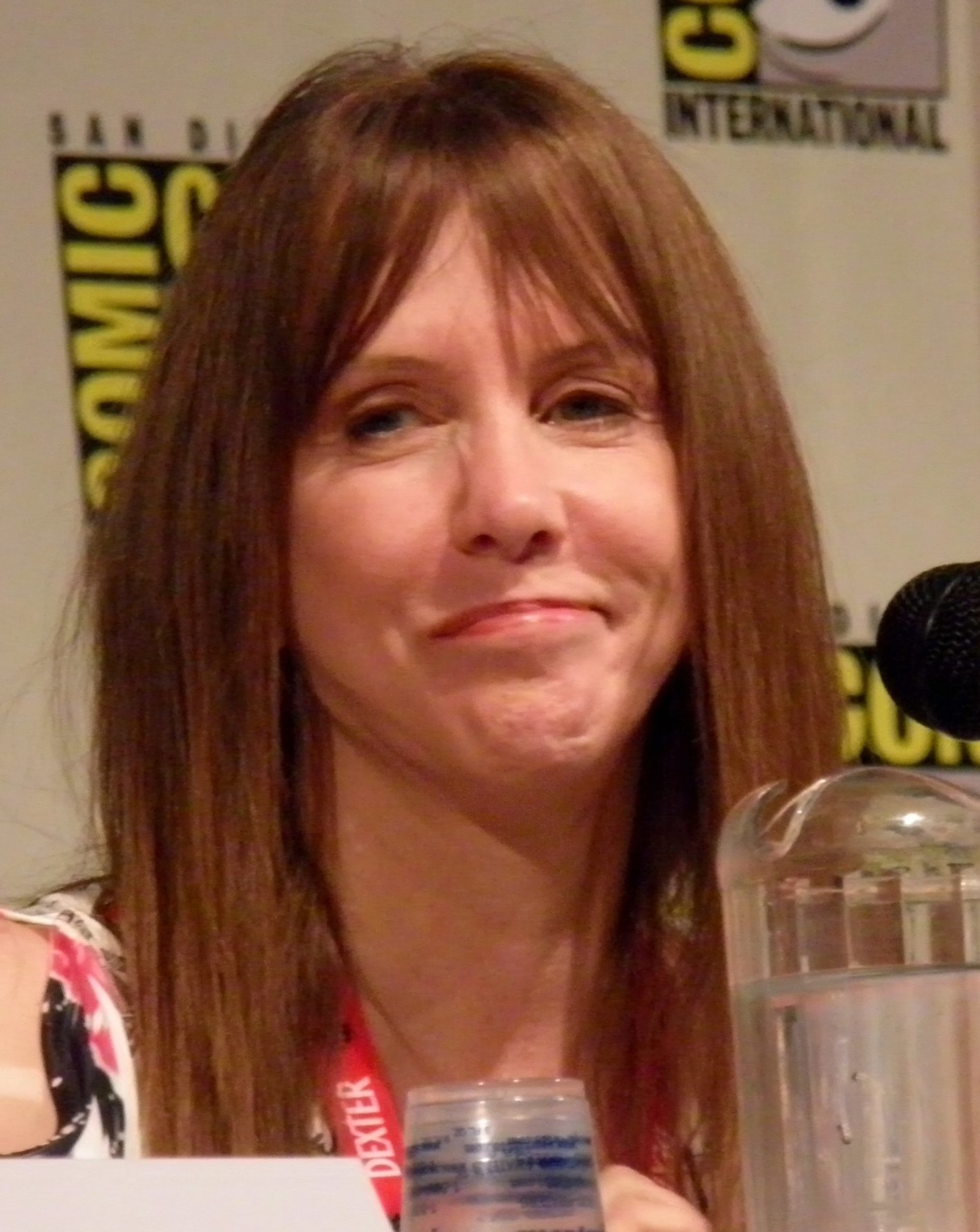
- Newman in 2011
- Born: March 2, 1952 (age 74); Los Angeles, California, U.S.
- Occupations: Actress; comedian; writer
- Years active: 1972–present
- Known for: Saturday Night Live
- Spouse: Chad Einbinder (m. 1991; div. 2016)
- Children: 2, including Hannah Einbinder

Laraine Newman (born March 2, 1952) is an American actress. Newman was part of the original cast of NBC's sketch comedy series Saturday Night Live from its inception in 1975 until her departure in 1980.

Newman took an interest in improv at Beverly Hills High School. After graduating in 1970, she studied mime with Marcel Marceau for a year in Paris. She then moved to Los Angeles and became a founding member of comedy improvisational group The Groundlings. She was first hired by Lorne Michaels for a Lily Tomlin TV special in 1974. The next year Newman became one of the original cast members of Saturday Night Live, working there from 1975 to 1980 and creating characters Connie Conehead, proto-Valley girl Sherry, and Christie Christina. In 2017, she and the rest of the original cast members of SNL were among the honorees of the Television Academy Hall of Fame.

She appeared in Stardust Memories, Problem Child 2, Coneheads, and The Flintstones. She is also a voice actor in both TV and movies, including Pixar films Finding Nemo, WALL-E, Up, and Inside Out. In 2021 her memoir May You Live in Interesting Times was released on Audible.

She is the younger sister of writer and musician Tracy Newman, and the mother of actress and comedian Hannah Einbinder and actor Spike Einbinder.

== Early life and career ==
Newman was born on March 2, 1952, in Los Angeles, California, the granddaughter of a cattle rancher from Arizona. Her family is Jewish. She is the youngest of four children and has a twin brother Paul. Her sister, Tracy Newman, is an Emmy Award–winning television writer. Newman attended Beverly Hills High School in Beverly Hills, California, and graduated from there in 1970. Newman took her first improvisational theatre classes when she was 15. After finishing high school she auditioned for four acting schools in England including the Royal Academy of Dramatic Art, London Academy of Music and Dramatic Art and Bristol Old Vic. She was not accepted to any of them, so she went to Paris to study mime with Marcel Marceau for a year.

By the age of 19, Newman returned to the United States, and moved back to Los Angeles, where she did a brief stint at a secretarial school. Committed to continue performing, she was a founding member of the pioneering comedy improvisational group The Groundlings. At the same time, Newman was working for a booking agent who worked with rock bands, typing up contracts.

Newman cites Eve Arden, Madeline Kahn and Richard Pryor as her first major influences, saying "They led me into my life of comedy, they led me into understanding 'The Art of Play'."

== Saturday Night Live ==
In 1974, Lorne Michaels hired 22-year-old Newman for a Lily Tomlin special, impressed with her work as founder and original member of The Groundlings. A year later, she became an original cast member on NBC's Saturday Night Live, appearing on the show from its inception in 1975 through 1980.

During her five years on SNL she became a close friend of co-star Gilda Radner, although there was also a degree of rivalry between them. The instant success of SNL propelled her to stardom very quickly. Newman recalled being stopped in the street in New York City by John Lennon and Yoko Ono, who introduced themselves to her.

Newman admits that she was "never a good improviser," but when in character, whether as an angry Jewish poet, a flight attendant, an eccentric chef, or a British groupie, she was "free". Commenting on her early experiences during Saturday Night Live she said: "When I first performed (my characters) and the audience responded, I felt like crying, I mean the idea that what I saw—what other people saw—(meant) I wasn't so alone in my perspective. I hope this doesn't sound too overblown, but it really did feel like a Communion."

However, by her own account, Newman was unhappy for much of her time with the show. She disliked living in New York, and during her years on SNL, Newman had developed serious eating disorders, as well as a heroin addiction. She spent so much time in her dressing room playing solitaire that for Christmas 1979, castmate Radner gave her a deck of playing cards with a picture of Newman on the face of each card.

Newman was photographed as a vampire by Francesco Scavullo for the July 1978 issue of High Times. The accompanying interview introduced Newman as the "Skinny spaced-out sex symbol of Saturday Night Live."

=== Recurring characters ===
Newman is best known for her roles as Connie Conehead, proto-Valley girl Sherry, and Christie Christina, the ditzy co-host of E. Buzz Miller (Dan Aykroyd)'s public-access television cable TV show. Using her own name, Newman also played a TV news reporter for Weekend Update when the segment was hosted by Chevy Chase (1975–1976) and Jane Curtin (1976–1980). Newman generally decided not to repeat her characters, and so has far fewer signature characters than some of her fellow cast members.

Newman states when asked about her favorite Saturday Night Live character: "My favorite character ... which, I think, only pleased me and no one else, was Lina Wertmüller (based on the actual Lina Wertmüller)."

== Later life and career ==
Newman's post-SNL film career has been in both leading and supporting roles, as well as a voice artist in television and features.

In her memoirs, Newman recounted dating Dan Aykroyd, Warren Zevon, Peter Cook, Phil Hartman, and P.J. O'Rourke. She was also in a relationship with Mark Mothersbaugh of the new wave band Devo years after the band did a guest spot in the fourth season of SNL. Newman and Mothersbaugh were together for a couple of years, during which time Newman played Donut Rooter in the band's We're All Devo VHS release (1984). In her memoirs, Newman claimed she was celibate for four years after the end of her relationship with Mothersbaugh.

=== 1970s ===
Prior to leaving SNL, Newman appeared in American Hot Wax (1978) and appeared in a cameo role in Mr. Mike's Mondo Video (1979).

=== 1980s ===
Newman continued to appear in film and television productions during the 1980s. Among these were Wholly Moses, Voltar The Invincible, Perfect, and Invaders from Mars. She also had a small role in Woody Allen's Stardust Memories (1980). In 1986 she starred in the syndicated B-movie comedy series, The Canned Film Festival, playing the lead role as Laraine the usherette. Additionally, she made appearances on Laverne & Shirley, E.T. and Friends (1983) (in which she reprised her role as Connie Conehead), Steve Martin's Best Show Ever (1981), St. Elsewhere, and Amazing Stories. Newman auditioned for the role of Masha in Martin Scorsese's The King of Comedy (1983); the role was played in the film by Sandra Bernhard. By her own admission, Newman's career during this period languished as she struggled with depression and chemical dependency issues. She became sober in 1987, after 21 years of drug use.

Newman celebrated her 36th birthday in March 1988 with a party in Los Angeles, which was the last time Gilda Radner was with her original SNL co-stars. According to Bill Murray, when he heard that Radner was about to leave the party, he and Dan Aykroyd carried her around the Los Angeles house where the party was held so that she could say goodbye to everyone. Radner died on May 20, 1989.

=== 1990s ===
Newman played the antagonist in Problem Child 2 (1991) and also appeared in 1993's Coneheads (in which Michelle Burke played Connie Conehead, the character Newman originated on SNL, while Newman appeared in a minor role as Connie's aunt Laarta). She appeared in episodes of Friends, 3rd Rock from the Sun, 7th Heaven, and in the 1994 film The Flintstones. She also started to focus on voice acting, on The Tick, Histeria!, CatDog, and Rugrats (in "All Growed Up", an episode which would form the basis of the spinoff All Grown Up!, for which she also provided voice work).

=== 2000s ===
In the 2000s, Newman lent her voice to animated movie and TV characters in Danny Phantom, As Told By Ginger, Avatar: The Last Airbender, Metalocalypse and Jimmy Neutron: Boy Genius. She provided voice work for WALL-E, Battle for Terra, Ponyo, Jungle Junction, Cars, Up!, Finding Nemo, Monsters, Inc., Barnyard, Cloudy with a Chance of Meatballs, Happily N'Ever After, and Horton Hears a Who!.

Newman also appeared in episodes of Entourage, Brothers & Sisters, According to Jim, and Curb Your Enthusiasm.

=== 2010s ===
Newman provided her voice in Dr. Seuss' The Lorax and Wreck-It Ralph, and made guest voice appearances in SpongeBob SquarePants (as Plankton's grandmother), Doc McStuffins, and Harvey Street Kids. She voiced Queen Jipjorrulac, the mother of Mark Chang, in The Fairly OddParents, and the Wicked Witch of the West in Tom and Jerry and the Wizard of Oz, an animated direct-to-DVD film set during the events of the original 1939 film.

On July 9, 2014, she appeared on Ken Reid's TV Guidance Counselor podcast.

In 2017, the original cast of Saturday Night Live (including Newman) was inducted into the Television Academy Hall of Fame.

=== 2020s ===
In 2025, she made a guest appearance during the Saturday Night Live 50th Anniversary Special in which she reminiscences about her memories in Studio 8H and tries to share them with a stagehand named Chad (Pete Davidson).

She voiced Hattie Tetch / Mad Hatter in the second season of Batman: Caped Crusader.

=== Writing ===
Newman also works as a writer and editor. She is a contributing editor for the online magazine One For The Table, and she is an occasional contributor to the Huffington Post. She has contributed articles for the Los Angeles Times, The Believer, and McSweeney's. She wrote the foreword to the book version of the UCB Production Worst Laid Plans. In March 2021, she published her audio memoir May You Live in Interesting Times on Audible.

== Personal life ==
Newman married actor-writer-director Chad Einbinder in 1991; their marriage ended after 25 years in 2016. Newman and Einbinder have two children, Spike and Hannah (b. 1995), who are both actors and comedians.

The song "Never Let Her Slip Away," written and recorded by Andrew Gold, was about Newman. The two were a couple at the time. The song hit #5 on the UK charts in 1978.

== Filmography ==
=== Live-action ===
==== Film ====
Year	Title	Role	Notes
1976	TunnelVision	Sonja	
1978	American Hot Wax	Teenage Louise	
1979	Mr. Mike's Mondo Video	Herself	Cameo appearance
1980	Stardust Memories	Film Executive	Uncredited
1980	Wholly Moses!	Zoey, Zerelda	
1983	We're All Devo	Donut Rooter	Video
1985	Perfect	Linda Slater	
1986	Invaders from Mars	Ellen Gardner	
1991	Problem Child 2	Lawanda Dumore	
1993	Coneheads	Laarta	
1993	Witchboard 2: The Devil's Doorway	Elaine	
1994	Revenge of the Red Baron	Carol Spencer	
1994	The Flintstones	Susan Rock	
1996	Jingle All the Way	First Lady	
1997	Demolition University	Professor Harris	Video
1998	Fear and Loathing in Las Vegas	Frog-Eyed Woman	
1998	I'm Losing You	Casting Director	
1998	Rusty: A Dog's Tale	Bertha Bimini	
1999	Baby Huey's Great Easter Adventure	Minnie	Video
2002	The Sum of All Fears	Russian Translator on TV	Uncredited
2014	Ready or Knot	Joanne	
2016	The Late Bloomer	Noema Willcoxen	

==== Television ====
Year	Title	Role	Notes
1975–80	Saturday Night Live	Herself	Cast member, 106 episodes
1982	Laverne & Shirley	Sheba	2 episodes
1982	St. Elsewhere	Jane Zontell	3 episodes
1984	Her Life as a Man	Barbara	TV movie
1985	George Burns Comedy Week		Episode: "The Honeybunnies"
1986	Alfred Hitchcock Presents	Periwinkle	Episode: "The Jar"
1986	The Magical World of Disney	Cynthia Fisher	Episode: "My Town"
1986	The Canned Film Festival	Laraine the Usherette	13 episodes
1987	Faerie Tale Theatre	Coral	Episode: "The Little Mermaid"
1987	Amazing Stories	Miss Schroedinger	Episode: "Miss Stardust"
1988	Monsters	Linda McGuire	Episode: "Rouse Him Not"
1989	Duet	Madame Marissa, Judge	Episode: "The New and Improved Linda"
1992	Dream On	Lenora Hemple	2 episodes
1993	Dudley	Dr. Singer	Episode: "Whose Therapy Is It, Anyway?"
1996	Friends	Mrs. Buffay	Episode: "The One With the Bullies"
1996	Chicago Hope	Dawn - Sutton's Ex #2	Episode: "Ex Marks the Spot"
1996	3rd Rock from the Sun	Candace	Episode: "World's Greatest Dick"
1997	Ellen	The Over-Supportive Parent	Episode: "Hello Muddah, Hello Faddah"
1997	Perversions of Science	Becky	Episode: "Panic"
1997	Jenny	Joella	Episode: "A Girl's Gotta Deck the Halls"
2000	Curb Your Enthusiasm	The Director	Episode: "The Group"
2002–04	7th Heaven	Rosina Glass	8 episodes
2003–04	According to Jim	Officer Laraine Elkin	3 episodes
2006	Brothers & Sisters	Lyla	Episode: "Affairs of State"
2007	Entourage	Jane	Episode: "Manic Monday"
2012	Easy to Assemble	The Neighbor	2 episodes
2013	How to Live with Your Parents (For the Rest of Your Life)	Deidre	Episode: "How to Help the Needy"
2013	The Birthday Boys	President of the Network	Episode: "Goofy Roofers"
2013–16	Comedy Bang! Bang!	Melrose Ballrod, Mandy	2 episodes
2014	Trophy Wife	Juniper	Episode: "The Big 5-0"
2016	Hidden America with Jonah Ray	Jacqueline Waters	Episode: "Los Angeles: All That Glitters Is Not Gold"
2017	Dice	Darcy	Episode: "No Bullsh*t"
2019	Los Espookys	Jacqueline Webster, Anne Hathaway	Episode: "El sueño falso (The Fake Dream)"
2023	Ghosts	Esther Lefkowitz	Episode: "Trevor's Body"
2023	Bookie	Eileen	Episode: "Some Whales Nix the Vig"

=== Voice roles ===
==== Film ====
Year	Title	Role	Notes
1985	Sesame Street Presents: Follow That Bird	Mommy Dodo	
1985	Voltar The Invincible	Wondra / Mrs. Lawrence	Uncredited
1997	Beauty and the Beast: The Enchanted Christmas	Various	Uncredited
2000	Fantasia 2000	Various	Uncredited
2001	Monsters, Inc.	Mother / School Teacher	
2001	Jimmy Neutron: Boy Genius	Hostess	
2003	Finding Nemo	Additional Voices	
2003	Charlotte's Web 2: Wilbur's Great Adventure	Gwen	
2004	Shrek 2	ADR Group	
2004	The Incredibles	Squeaker's Owner	Uncredited
2006	The Wild	Girl Monkey	
2006	Barnyard	Snotty Boy's Friend	
2007	Happily N'Ever After	Additional Voices	
2007	Surf's Up	Female Penguin #3	
2008	Horton Hears a Who!	Mrs. Glummox	
2008	Ponyo	Woman in the boat	English dub
2008	WALL-E	Beauty Bot / Paramedic Bot / Announcer Bot	
2009	Cloudy with a Chance of Meatballs	French Newscaster	
2009	Up	Dogs/Additional Voices	
2009	The Haunted World of El Superbeasto	Smelga Strudel, Betty Sue Lou, Courtney, Kate, Lefty	
2010	Shrek Forever After	ADR Group	
2010	Tangled	Additional Voices	
2010	Toy Story 3	Additional Voices	
2011	Tom and Jerry and the Wizard of Oz	Miss Almira Gulch/Wicked Witch of the West	
2012	The Lorax	Woman	
2012	Wreck-It Ralph	Various Nicelanders	
2012	Superman vs. The Elite	Newscaster #3	
2013	Despicable Me 2	Woman	
2014	Tom and Jerry: The Lost Dragon	Elf Elder's Wife	
2014	The Boxtrolls	Female Townsfolk	
2015	Inside Out	Jill Andersen's Fear	
2015	Minions	Additional Voices	
2016	The Secret Life of Pets	Additional Voices	
2016	Nerdland	Old Woman	
2016	Sing	Meena's Grandmother	
2016	Tom and Jerry: Back to Oz	Wicked Witch of the West	
2017	Despicable Me 3	Additional Voices	
2017	The Emoji Movie	Additional Voices	
2017	The Nut Job 2: Nutty by Nature	Daredevil Chipmunk	
2018	The Grinch	Additional Voices	
2019	The Secret Life of Pets 2	Cow	
2021	Trollhunters: Rise of the Titans	Ms. Janeth	
2024	Inside Out 2	Additional Voices	
2024	Despicable Me 4	Melora, Additional Voices	
2025	Dog Man	Scientist	
2025	The Day the Earth Blew Up: A Looney Tunes Movie	Mrs. Grecht	
2026	The Sheep Detectives	a "fainting sheep"	

==== Television ====
Year	Title	Role	Notes
1993–1994	Problem Child	Lawanda Dumore / Various	
1995	The Sylvester & Tweety Mysteries	Trudy, Laura Fontleroy, Eve, Harem Girl	4 episodes
1996	The Tick	Flying Squirrel	Episode: "The Tick vs. Education"
1997	Pinky and the Brain	Giselle, Housewife, Secretary	3 episodes
1998	Superman: The Animated Series	Toby Raynes	Episode: "Apokolips...Now!"
1998	The New Batman Adventures	Baby Doll	Episode: "Love is a Croc"
1998–2000	Histeria!	Miss Information, various voices	Main role
1999	Detention	Ms. Treacle	Episode: "The Contest"
1999	Hey Arnold!	Librarian, Kid, TV Reporter	2 episodes
2000	The Oblongs	Ms. Hubbard	8 episodes
2000	The Cartoon Cartoon Show	Lydia Lucas	Episode: "Lucky Lydia"
2000–2006	As Told by Ginger	Lois Foutley	43 episodes
2001–2003	Oswald	Madame Butterfly, various voices	22 episodes
2001–2013	The Fairly OddParents	Alien Queen Jipjorrulac, Mother Nature	9 episodes
2002	The Zeta Project	Dr. Marion O'Keefe	Episode: "Quality Time"
2003	What's New, Scooby-Doo?	Wor-El	Episode: "The Fast and the Wormious"
2004–2007	Danny Phantom	Pam Manson, Mrs. Tetslaff, 1950s Ghost Jock	6 episodes
2004	Justice League Unlimited	Medusa	Episode: "This Little Piggy"
2005	The Buzz on Maggie	Lacey Ladybug	Episode: "Ladybugged"
2006	Avatar: The Last Airbender	Lily	Episode: "The Cave of Two Lovers"
2006–2012	Metalocalypse	Pickles' Mom, News Anchor, Dory McClean, Additional Characters	15 episodes
2009–2012	Jungle Junction	Carla	14 episodes
2010–2018	SpongeBob SquarePants	Ella Plankton	3 episodes
2010	Batman: The Brave and the Bold	Ms. Minerva	Episode: "The Power of Shazam!"
2011	The Garfield Show	Aunt Ivy, Chicken, Winona	4 episodes
2011	Beavis and Butt-Head	Biology Teacher	3 episodes
2011–2013	Winx Club	Queen Ligea	Seasons 3-5
2012–2014	Doc McStuffins	Aurora, Professor Hootsburgh, Southwest Sal	25 episodes
2012	Scooby-Doo! Mystery Incorporated	Granny Snaggletooth	Episode: "Night on Haunted Mountain"
2012	Motorcity	Kaia	2 episodes
2013	Turbo FAST	Queen Invicta	Episode: "Ants Ants Revolution"
2013	Kung Fu Panda: Legends of Awesomeness	Yan Fan	Episode: "Mama Told Me Not to Kung Fu"
2013	Toy Story of Terror!	Betsy	Television film
2014	Beware the Batman	Diner Owner	Episode: "Monsters"
2015	The Adventures of Puss in Boots	Pajuna, Piper, Torvil, Mother Dragon	37 episodes
2015	Be Cool, Scooby-Doo!	Professor Salazar, Running Girl, Museum Guard	
2015–2017	Dawn of the Croods	Gran, One-Eyed Amber, Mosh, Pram	52 episodes
2016	Milo Murphy's Law	Ms. White	
2016–2018	Trollhunters: Tales of Arcadia	Nana, Ms. Janeth, Bully Troll, Mrs. Palchuck, Customs Agent, Museum Director	27 episodes
2016–2024	Kulipari	Koa, Thuma	
2017	Adventure Time	Widow	Episode: "Min and Marty"
2017–2020	Dorothy and the Wizard of Oz	Wicked Witch of the West	
2017–2020	Vampirina	Narcissa, Ms. Fincher, Mrs. Sludgio, Stage Manager, Audience Member	8 episodes
2017–2020	Talking Tom & Friends	Ms. Vanthrax	8 episodes
2018–2019	3Below: Tales of Arcadia	Nana, Ms. Janeth	18 episodes
2018–2020	The Epic Tales of Captain Underpants	Ms. Tara Ribble	8 episodes
2019	Harvey Girls Forever!	Ryan Ninaman	1 episode
2019	Apple & Onion	Butter	Episode: "Heatwave"
2019–2020	Summer Camp Island	Hedgehog's Mother	2 episodes
2020	Archibald's Next Big Thing	Suzie	Episode: "The Chair Museum"
2020	Bob's Burgers	Dove Shannon	Episode: "Local She-ro"
2020	Infinity Train	Marette Gillicutty, Maise Trundleshank	Episode: "The Family Tree Car"
2021	Ridley Jones	Peaches	
2023	Big Nate	Marge Wright	4 episodes
2023–2025	Tiny Toons Looniversity	Joan Shwinefield	
2023-2026	Beavis and Butt-Head	Various	6 episodes
2024	Grimsburg	The Kid Napper	Episode: "McSnuff the Mystery Mutt"
2025	Krapopolis	Clotho	Episode: "John Fate Comes a-Knockin"
2025	Super Duper Bunny League	Rubberglove/Mrs. Fuzzleglove	Episode: "Mrs. Fuzzleglove"
2026	Batman: Caped Crusader	Hattie Tetch	

==== Video games ====
Year	Title	Role	Notes
2000	Stupid Invaders	Additional Voices	
2003	The Fairly OddParents: Breakin' da Rules	Alien Queen Jipjorrulac	
2005	Madagascar	Queen Bee, Grandma, Woman	
2005	True Crime: New York City	Additional Voices	
2007	Bee Movie Game	Additional Voices	
2007	Spider-Man 3	Additional Voices	
2007	Neverwinter Nights 2: Mask of the Betrayer	Sheva Whitefeather, NPC (Wise Woman)	
2008	The Rise of the Argonauts	Additional Voices	
2011	Star Wars: The Old Republic	Additional Voices	
2013	Lightning Returns: Final Fantasy XIII	Additional Voices	
2016	Let It Die	Mother Barb	
2019	Dota 2	Snapfire	
2020	SpongeBob: Patty Pursuit	Granny Plankton	
2025	SpongeBob: Patty Pursuit 2	Granny Plankton	

==== Web series ====
Year	Title	Role	Notes
2011	It's Fred	Mrs. DeWinter (voice)	Episode: "Fred Gets Adopted"

== Accolades ==
Newman has been nominated for awards numerous times, most notably for an Emmy in 1979 as a cast member of Saturday Night Live.

Awards and nominations
Year	Association	Category	Work	Result
1979	Primetime Emmy Awards	Outstanding Writing in a Comedy – Variety or Music Series (shared with the other writers)	Saturday Night Live	Nominated
2016	Annie Award	Outstanding Achievement in Voice Acting in an Animated TV/Broadcast Production (Voice of "Amber" for the episode "The First Picture Show")	Dawn of the Croods	Nominated
2012	Behind the Voice Actors Awards	Best Vocal Ensemble in a TV Special/Direct-to-DVD Title or Short (shared with the other cast)	Tom and Jerry & The Wizard of Oz	Nominated
2017	Behind the Voice Actors Awards	Best Vocal Ensemble in a New Television Series (shared with the other cast)	Milo Murphy's Law	Nominated
2017	Behind the Voice Actors Awards	Best Female Vocal Performance in a Television Series in a Supporting Role (Voice of "Miss Janeth")	Trollhunters	Nominated
2017	Television Academy's Hall of Fame	Honoree (as original cast member of Saturday Night Live)	Saturday Night Live	Won
