= Roger Bowen =

American actor and novelist (1932–1996)

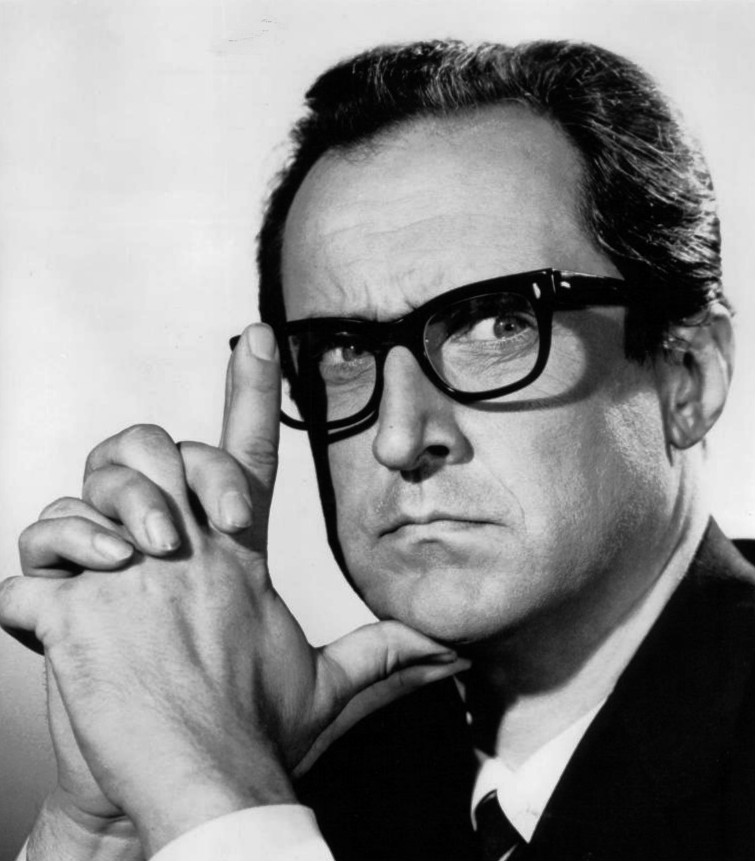
- Bowen as Hamilton Majors Jr. in Arnie, 1971
- Born: Roger Wendell Bowen; May 25, 1932; Providence, Rhode Island, U.S.
- Died: February 16, 1996 (aged 63); Marathon, Florida, U.S.
- Education: Brown University; University of Chicago
- Occupations: Actor; Novelist; Co-Founder, The Second City
- Years active: 1955–1996
- Spouse: Ann Bowen
- Children: 3

Roger Wendell Bowen (May 25, 1932 – February 16, 1996) was an American comedic actor and novelist, best known for his portrayal of Lt. Col. Henry Blake in the 1970 film M*A*S*H.

Bowen considered himself a writer who only moonlighted as an actor. He wrote eleven novels (including Just Like a Movie) as well as sketches for Broadway and television. He was also one of the co-founders of Chicago's comedy and acting troupe The Second City.

== Life ==
Bowen was the only child of Wendell and Edith (nee Hudson) Bowen. He was a native of Providence, Rhode Island. Bowen majored in English at Brown University, then attended graduate school at the University of Chicago.

Bowen served in the U.S. Army in Korea, after the Korean War had ended. (After serving in Japan as a Special Agent in the Counter Intelligence Corps (441st CIC Detachment – Beppu Field Office) from 1957–58, Bowen was sent to the 308th CIC Detachment in Seoul, South Korea in 1958.)

== Career ==
While writing theater reviews for The Chicago Maroon, he was asked to pen material for an improvisational troupe that included Alan Arkin and Mike Nichols. The troupe, Compass Players, evolved into The Second City.

Roger Bowen wrote the promotional material and took on the function of running the Compass on dark Mondays, booking and introducing amusing debates or folk music nights.

Bowen spent most of the 1960s playing "preppie" types on a number of TV & radio commercials. His first film role was 1968's Petulia, but his big movie break came in 1970 when he landed the role of Lieutenant Colonel Henry Blake in Robert Altman's film M*A*S*H. After M*A*S*H, Bowen returned to television and gained a fan following as Hamilton Majors Jr., the pleasantly snooty Ivy League CEO of Continental Flange and supportive boss of Herschel Bernardi on the TV sitcom Arnie (1970–72). He then joined the cast of The Brian Keith Show, and returned to TV commercials and smaller movie roles. In 1976, Bowen appeared in the TV parody film Tunnel Vision, doing a convincing Henry Kissinger impersonation that he was often asked to perform at parties around Hollywood. (The film featured a galaxy of comic stars including Chevy Chase, John Candy, Howard Hesseman and Joe Flaherty, but Bowen received top billing as the others were still relatively unknown at the time.) Bowen also played minor roles in such films as Heaven Can Wait (1978), The Main Event (1979) and Zapped! (1982). In the early 1980s, Bowen enjoyed another round weekly TV work with recurring roles on House Calls (starring former M*A*S*H sitcom alumnus Wayne Rogers), At Ease, and Maggie Briggs. He made his final credited film appearance in the 1991 comedy What About Bob? starring Bill Murray and Richard Dreyfuss.

== Chess ==
Bowen was a tournament chess player who participated in several events in the 1970s.

== Personal life and death ==
Bowen met and married the Bronx-raised Ann Raim, in Chicago.

After they moved to San Francisco, Ann formed the Pitschel Players, " named after Second City/Committee master carpenter Roland Pitschel and master Committee waitress/tip hustler Barbara Pitschel", an improvisational comedy group, and directed the group of political and social satirists, that played for ten years, performing with Country Joe McDonald, at Episcopal Church of St. John the Evangelist, San Francisco, on weekends at the Intersection for the Arts and other venues in San Francisco and the Bay Area. The Pitschel Players included Paul Willson, John Pray, Robin Menken, John Bailey, James Carroll Pickett III, Gene Babo (musical director) and Edie McClurg (beginning 1975). In 1974, producer Joe Roth and the Pitschel Players relocated to Los Angeles. Soon after 11 November 1973, Roth and Bowen leased 8162 Melrose Avenue, as the Pitschel Players Cabaret, which was the former Ash Grove nightclub site, and the later L.A. Improv. Al Franken and Tom Davis performed at the Pitschel Players Cabaret. David Lander and Michael McKean "moonlighted" by performing at the Pitschel Players Cabaret. The Pitschel Players appeared in 1977's Cracking Up.

In 1980, Bowen and Ann moved back to New York.

Bowen died of a heart attack at the age of 63 while on vacation in Marathon, Florida. His death came one day after that of McLean Stevenson, who played Blake for the first three seasons of the M*A*S*H television series. (Stevenson also died from a heart attack; because of this strange coincidence, Bowen's family did not make the news of his death public until a week afterward in an attempt to minimize any confusion over the two actors and their obituaries.)

== Filmography ==
Year	Title	Role	Notes
1967	Funnyman	Lester, Social Scientist	
1967	Petulia	Warren	
1968	Bullitt	Man	
1970	M*A*S*H	Lt. Col. Henry Blake	
1970	Move	Rabbi	
1970	Arnie	Hamilton Majors Jr.	TV series 1970-72
1973	Steelyard Blues	Fire Commissioner Francis	
1973	Wicked, Wicked	Simmons, Hotel Manager	
1976	Tunnel Vision	Henry Kissinger	
1978	Heaven Can Wait	Newspaperman	
1979	The Main Event	Owner Sinthia Cosmetics	
1980	Foxes	Counsellor	
1980	First Family	Senator William 'Wild Bill' Hubley	
1982	Zapped!	Mr. Springboro	
1982	At Ease	Col. Clapp	TV series
1987	Morgan Stewart's Coming Home	Dr. Cabot	
1991	What About Bob?	Phil	
1993	Even Cowgirls Get the Blues	Naturalist filming whooping cranes from aircraft	Uncredited, (final film role)

== Bibliography ==
- Bowen, Roger (1979). Inga. Normandie Publishing. ISBN 978-0960298617.
- Bowen, Roger (1995). The Silent Fifties. Normandie Publishing. ISBN 978-0960298624.
- Bowen, Roger (1996). Just Like a Movie. Normandie Publishing. ISBN 978-0960298631.
