= Raines =

2007 television program

- Genre: Police procedural
- Created by: Graham Yost
- Directed by: Frank Darabont
- Starring: Jeff Goldblum; Matt Craven; Nicole Sullivan; Linda Park; Dov Davidoff; Malik Yoba; Madeleine Stowe
- Country of origin: United States
- Original language: English
- No. of seasons: 1
- No. of episodes: 7

Production
- Executive producers: Graham Yost; Félix Enríquez Alcalá; Fred Golan
- Producer: Preston Fischer
- Production location: Los Angeles
- Production company: NBC Universal

Original release
- Network: NBC
- Release: March 15 – April 27, 2007

Raines is a 2007 American police procedural television show created by Graham Yost.

Broadcast on NBC, it stars Jeff Goldblum as Los Angeles Police homicide detective Michael Raines, who returns to duty after a shooting, and copes by hallucinating the victims in his cases. The ensemble cast includes Matt Craven, Nicole Sullivan, Linda Park, Dov Davidoff, Malik Yoba, and Madeleine Stowe. The seven-episode series aired from March 15 to April 27, 2007, and received mixed reviews, with critics divided on the premise but singling out Goldblum's lead performance.

== Premise ==
Michael Raines (Goldblum) is a police detective who investigates murders. With the series premiere, Raines is returning to work after recovering from a shootout that killed his partner, Charlie Lincoln (Malik Yoba). Over the course of each episode, Raines involuntarily hallucinates the victims, whom he speaks to and uses as sounding boards for his case; as Raines learns more about the dead, the apparitions he sees change duly. Once Raines solves their murders, the hallucinations disappear. Creator and executive producer Graham Yost found the analogous premise of Raines in his own creative process: "I spend time alone in a room, thinking of characters and interacting with them. And I'll talk a dialogue in my head."

Variety categorized the show as "a throwback to the 1970s — a single-lead detective show that neatly wraps up whodunit each hour."

=== Episodes ===
Zap2it shows that seven episodes of Raines aired from March 15 – April 27, 2007.

No.	Title	Directed by	Written by	Original release date	Viewers (millions)
1	"Pilot"	Frank Darabont	Graham Yost	March 15, 2007	10.5
Sandy Boudreau (Alexa Davalos) was a college student and escort who was hired by Wendy Tucker (Ashley Gardner) to honey trap her husband (Jeff Perry). When Boudreau failed and threatened to reveal the plot, Tucker shot her. In the penultimate scene, Raines steals Boudreau's money from evidence and gives it to her mother (Valerie Mahaffey) to escape her abusive marriage.
2	"Meet Juan Doe"	Fred Keller	Graham Yost	March 22, 2007	8.7
After bringing his wife Maria (Carmen Corral) and their baby (Kyle Barker) to the US, Julio Santiago (Nicholas Gonzalez) is shot and dumped in a canal. Raines rules out Santiago's coyote. Instead, it was anti-immigration councilman Aurelio Sanchez (A Martinez) who killed the unarmed Santiago, believing him to be a hitman. Santiago was Sanchez's illegitimate child who secretly planned the whole trip to meet his father. In a subplot, Raines begins reluctantly seeing a therapist (Stowe) at his captain's insistence.
3	"Reconstructing Alice"	Peter Werner	Fred Golan	March 30, 2007	7
Alice Brody (Laurie Metcalf) was mentally ill, homeless, and living in Venice Beach when she is shot and killed. The manager of an insolvent local homeless shelter (Cheryl White) conspired with her neighbor Jason Kitman (T. James Lynde) to use the homeless' identities for committing insider trading. After Brody was denied Supplemental Security Income due to the fraudulent accounts in her name, she was shot and killed by Kitman. Raines' therapy continues apace; he worries he will end up like Brody due to his mental health.
4	"Stone Dead"	Felix Alcala	Bruce Rasmussen	April 6, 2007	6.7
Orphaned Jimmy Davis (Owen Beckman) joined and eventually led a gang in Victorville. Mentored by an LA comics artist and shop-owner (Stephen Tobolowsky), Davis moved to the city and worked to better himself. The gang followed Davis to LA, and after losing money trying to deal drugs, forced Davis to counterfeit comics. When Davis refused to continue doing so, the gang's muscle and new leader, "Surfer", killed him. Raines meanwhile is mentoring and worrying over Lincoln's son, who has been acting out.
5	"5th Step"			April 13, 2007	6.4
6	"Inner Child"			April 20, 2007	5.9
7	"Closure"			April 27, 2007	5.6

== Production ==
Raines was filmed in Los Angeles by NBC Universal Television Studio. Graham Yost was the executive producer, joined by Félix Enríquez Alcalá and Fred Golan. Preston Fischer was producer while Frank Darabont was credited with directing. NBC ceased production after seven episodes.

=== Cast ===
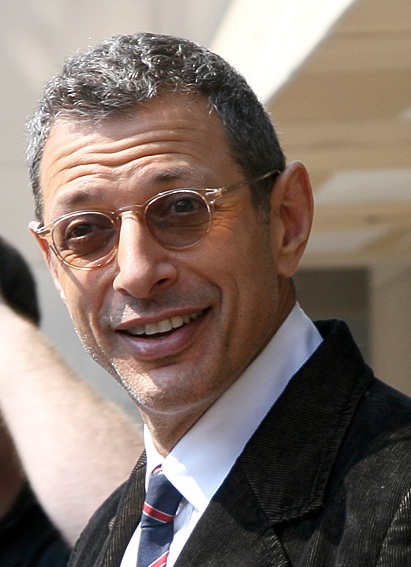
Jeff Goldblum (2007)

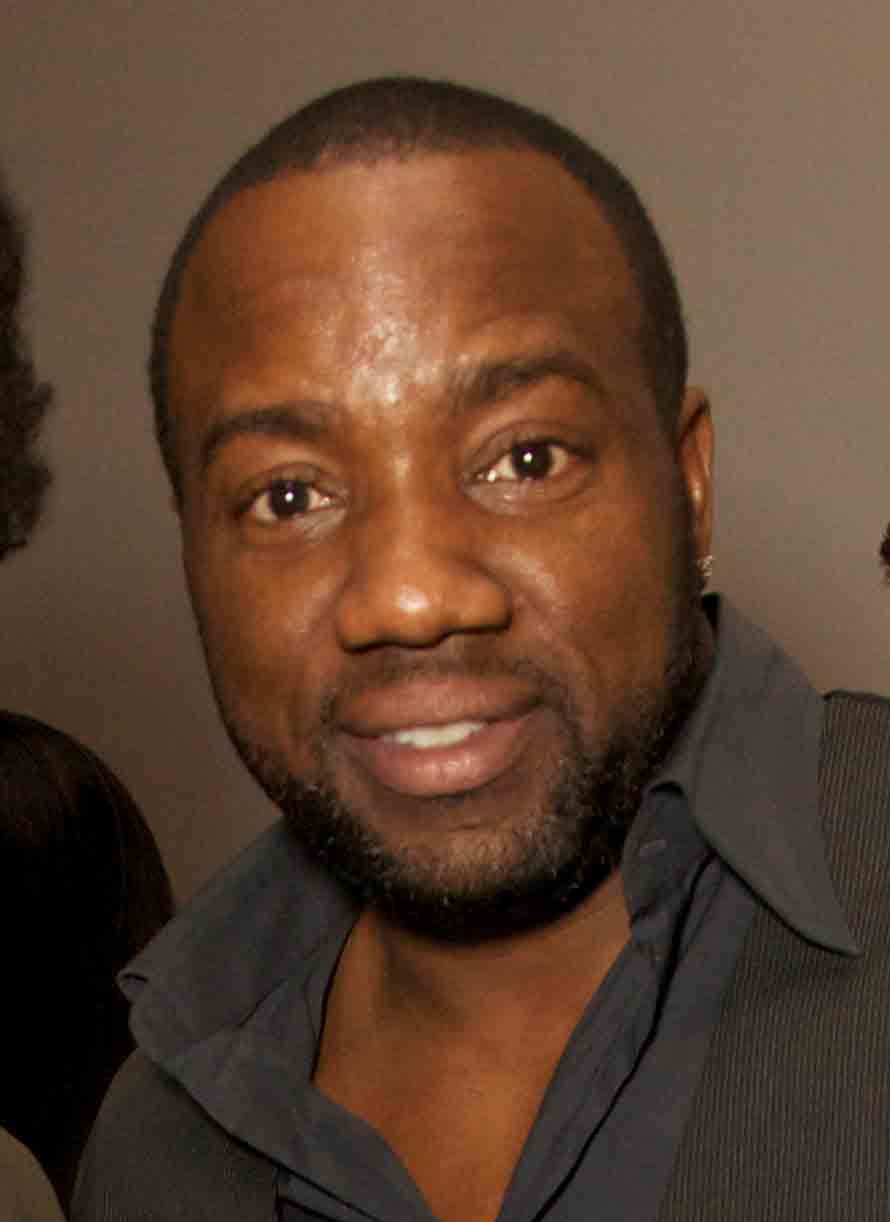
Malik Yoba (2010)

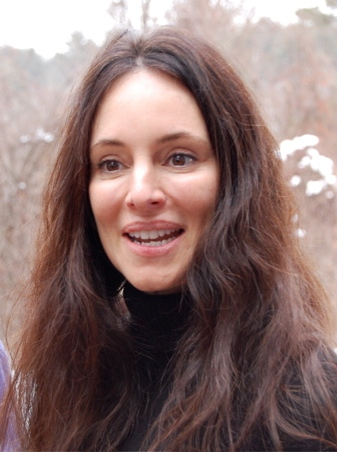
Madeleine Stowe (2008)

Yost cast Jeff Goldblum as Michael Raines, homicide detective and Raymond Chandler fan who, like Chandler's Philip Marlowe, "hides a tender heart beneath cynical gibes and sarcastic asides." Media Life called the choice ideal, what with Goldblum's "unconventional looks, mannerisms and vocal style."

Malik Yoba was cast as Charlie Lincoln, Raines' partner who died before the show began; whereas he once kept his eccentric partner grounded, now Raines hallucinates his presence and continues to rely on his assistance.

Madeleine Stowe plays Dr. Samantha Kohl, a psychiatrist unenviably tasked with helping Raines cope with the loss of his partner and subsequent hallucinations.

Rounding out Raines' cast are:

- Matt Craven as Captain Daniel Lewis
- Dov Davidoff as Remi Boyer
- Linda Park as Michelle Lance
- Nicole Sullivan as Carolyn Crumley

== Release and cancellation ==
On December 21, 2006, Australia's Network 10 secured the rights to broadcast Raines (and Friday Night Lights) in that nation. Raines was a mid-season replacement for NBC that premiered in the US at 10 p.m. on March 15, 2007. Raines was cancelled; in an interview, Goldblum reflected that he was fortunate to have had the opportunity, especially as it led to his starring role in Law & Order: Criminal Intent.

== Reception ==
As of July 2023, the review aggregators Rotten Tomatoes and Metacritic positively rated the series between 57–65 percent; the former published a score of 65 percent based on 20 reviews with an average rating of 6.2/10, while the latter published a weighted average score of 57 out of 100 based on 26 critics, indicating "mixed or average reviews".

David Bianculli broadly praised Raines, calling for NBC to renew the brand-new show after having seen only two episodes. Media Life's Andrew Lyons called Raines a fresh injection of film noir sensibilities into the world of "Bruckheimer quick cuts". Comparing Raines to characters played by Humphrey Bogart and Robert Mitchum, Lyons called Yost's take successful. For the New York Post, Raines was the only standout among the 2007 mid-season replacements that otherwise "overflow[ed] with […] horrible writing, amateurish acting and plot lines that stink up the joint." Linda Stasi described this cream of that crop as an amalgamation of other lasting serials such as Columbo, Medium, and Monk. Invoking those same shows, USA Today's Robert Bianco was pleased with the Goldblum vehicle, further lauding Yost's "fascination with the beauty and peculiarity of Los Angeles. This is Raymond Chandler for the Age of Therapy."

Brian Lowry of Variety called Raines unremarkable in its field, with only Jeff Goldblum to distinguish it, conceding that his analysis also fit the popular shows House (with Hugh Laurie) and Monk (with Tony Shalhoub). Lowry appreciated Raines eschewing mysticism in favor of Raines' acknowledged hallucinations. The Toronto Star's Vinay Menon similarly called Goldblum the show's driver, but that the performance "sometimes feels locked inside the wrong car." Though the San Francisco Chronicle anticipated a quick cancellation for Raines for its predictability, pandering, and mediocrity, reviewer Tim Goodman nonetheless called it an "enjoyable time waster", praising Goldblum and the show's "crisp, darkly saturated visual style". Alessandra Stanley thought Raines was an overly slavish homage to 1986's The Singing Detective; while she was uncertain about the hallucination gimmick—noting that most television detectives have been strong men with faults (e.g. Kojak with his lollipop or Ironside in his wheelchair)—Stanley felt Raines was trying to be too much and was muddled therefor. She did recommend allowing Goldblum's new vehicle to find its feet, though, much like House, Boston Legal, and Shark did.

Scott D. Pierce of the Deseret News found Raines to simply be a boring, "fairly standard detective show" that cribbed from other, more-successful programs like The Sopranos. Ellen Gray wrote in The Philadelphia Inquirer that the well-trod hallucinating character trope only served to make Raines an unappealing character to audiences, and this failing central tenet of the show doomed it from the start.
