= Queens Logic =

- Theatrical release poster
- Directed by: Steve Rash
- Written by: Tony Spiridakis; Joseph W. Savino
- Produced by: Russell Smith; Stuart Oken
- Starring: Kevin Bacon; Linda Fiorentino; John Malkovich; Joe Mantegna; Ken Olin; Tony Spiridakis; Tom Waits; Chloe Webb; Jamie Lee Curtis
- Cinematography: Amir M. Mokri
- Edited by: Patrick Kennedy
- Music by: Joe Jackson
- Production company: New Visions Pictures
- Distributed by: Seven Arts (through New Line Cinema)
- Release date: February 1, 1991
- Running time: 113 minutes
- Country: United States
- Language: English
- Budget: $12 million
- Box office: $612,781

Queens Logic is a 1991 American ensemble coming-of-age comedy-drama film from Seven Arts Pictures starring Kevin Bacon, Linda Fiorentino, Joe Mantegna, Jamie Lee Curtis, John Malkovich, Ken Olin, Chloe Webb and Tom Waits. It was directed by Steve Rash.

== Synopsis ==
This film depicts a cohort of Astoria, Queens working-class, now-thirtysomething childhood neighborhood friends confronting their history together and their future, while behaving both like children and mature adults, and both deceiving and revealing. Ray, the central character, and his childhood friends Al, Dennis and Vinny struggle with issues of commitment in their romantic relationships. Eliot is a gay, later friend who roomed with all of them in a two bedroom apartment as adults and is lonely but dislikes "camp" men. Al and his wife Carla are having serious marital issues, mainly due to his happy go lucky, immature personality. Ray is engaged to Patricia, a wary hairdresser, but he is scared of the effect the marriage may have on his ambitious oil painting career. Vinny is a struggling actor who has dysfunctional one night stands and desires something more meaningful. Dennis is a musician who moved to "Hollywood" to hit the "big time". His braggadocio subsides as he starts dealing with issues he left behind in Queens. The film centers around the preparations for an anniversary, a bachelor party and a wedding which challenges the characters to emotionally mature. The characters face adulthood and discover the meaning of 'Queens Logic.' This comedy film takes a look at the concepts of friendship, loyalty, and love.

== Cast (in credits order) ==
Publicity Stills
- getty images
- On-set
- L.A. premiere

- Kevin Bacon as Dennis
- Linda Fiorentino as Carla
- John Malkovich as Eliot
- Joe Mantegna as Al
- Ken Olin as Ray
- Tony Spiridakis as Vinny
- Tom Waits as Monte
- Chloe Webb as Patricia
- Jamie Lee Curtis as Grace
- Michael Zelniker as Marty
- Kelly Bishop as Maria
- Terry Kinney as Jeremy
- Ed Marinaro as Jack
- Wendy Gazelle as Kate
- Jodie Markell as Inez
- Jenny Wright as Asha
- Bruce MacVittie as Joey Clams' Nephew

== Production ==
Astoria native Tony Spiridakis wrote the first draft of the screenplay for the film in 1986. He shopped it around to various producers before settling on Stuart Oken, a Chicago theater producer whose previous film production, About Last Night, had been a modest box office hit in the same year. During the filming of the movie, Spiridakis had a dispute with some of his own friends from Brooklyn, who had claimed co-ownership of the script.

== Reception ==
The movie garnered mixed reviews.

Janet Maslin of The New York Times wrote that the film "fans the flames of its characters' dissatisfaction only to put them out again, which makes it more tidily circular than surprising"; she did, however, commend the "big and eminently watchable cast, brought together for ceaseless partying and clowning". Roger Ebert gave it two-and-a-half stars, compared it to a number of other coming-of-age films and those set in the Brooklyn-Queens area, and remarked that "the screenplay by Tony Spiridakis introduces a large gallery of characters in no apparent order and then moves casually among their stories". He and Gene Siskel both gave it thumbs down on their television series; Gene felt it was too purposelessly overloaded with stereotypes for its own good.

Michael Wilmington took a negative view of the film in the Los Angeles Times, stating:

Remember all the good times we think we had, the questionably rosy glow we paste on our pasts? In "Queens Logic", writer-actor Tony Spiridakis ransacks his reveries, brings back the old gang—as wedding bells may partially be breaking them up. But he can’t shake the trap of nostalgia. He can’t make his memories breathe.

Spiridakis, and director Steve Rash ("The Buddy Holly Story"), and an uncommonly gifted cast, obviously want us to feel the juice of old friendships, recapture the special street dirt, rhythm and nervy intimacy of Queens itself. The movie’s dominating image is the Hellgate Bridge: both crossway to a better life, and a test of male prowess. In the two key scenes, Al the stud (Joe Mantegna) tries twice to climb a rope that has been dangling, apparently forever, from the girders.

Al may or may not make it, but the movie sure doesn't. "Queens Logic" should be funny, pungent, poignant, but somehow it keeps turning strident and sentimental. It's not that the incidents are false—many seem obviously plucked from life—but they're written and played false: too large, too broad, too planted with meaning.

Jonathan Rosenbaum of the Chicago Reader said of the film,

The form and the material couldn’t be more familiar: a bachelor party in Queens that brings together several working-class childhood friends, very much in the manner of something like Diner. What makes it sparkle is the cornucopia of actors' shtick provided by the talented cast: Joe Mantegna, John Malkovich, Kevin Bacon, Linda Fiorentino, Tom Waits, Ken Olin, Chloe Webb, and Jamie Lee Curtis. Steve Rash directed Tony Spiridakis's script as if we haven't already received its gist countless times before, and the actors somehow managed to follow suit.

Time Out magazine wrote a sharply critical review of the film, calling it "yet another post-Big Chill way-we-were movie: a bunch of buddies hang out remembering the good times, the bad times, the godawful records. [ . . . ] Steve Rash handles the slightly diffuse business with sensitivity, but the film coasts mainly on the acting. Mantegna stands out for sheer bravado; Chloe Webb just about contrives to steal the show with a lipful of feistiness. But, as usual, it's really a boys' film, about leering, beering and losing your swim-shorts, and for straight boozy larking, Hangin' with the Homeboys has it licked by a mile."

Later, it was reevaluated and received some praise from online critics. Although Ted Baehr's MovieGuide website objected to the film's view of homosexuality, he did say "the picture is quite well-acted." Frederic and Mary Ann Brussat of the website Spirituality & Practice called the film "a deft snapshot of men who cannot unravel the mystery of women or free themselves from the male bonding of their adolescence." Doc Ezra of the website Need Coffee praised the film immensely, but criticized Artisan Entertainment for not providing a widescreen transfer of the film on its DVD release.

Christine Spagnuolo, an intern at the Queens Chronicle, lauded the film in a June 24, 2015 essay, praising the multi-borough scope of the film's shooting locations, and adding that "well-known actors such as Kevin Bacon and Jamie Lee Curtis embodied the characteristics of nitty-gritty, ordinary people and a realistic Queens attitude that most people who grew up in the area are able to relate to."

=== Box office ===
The movie was not successful on limited release.

== DVD release ==
The film was released on DVD three times. Once in 1999 under the Pioneer label, the second time in 2002 under the Platinum Disc label, and the third time that same year by Artisan Home Entertainment. The DVD contains just the film and its theatrical trailer.

Queens Logic was filmed in the summer of 1989, but didn't get released until February 1991. Although released theatrically in the US, Queens Logic was released direct-to-video in the UK.

== See also ==
- American Graffiti (1973)
- Return of the Secaucus 7 (1980)
- Diner (1982)
- The Big Chill (1983)
- St. Elmo's Fire (1985)
- Five Corners (1988)
