= American Cyborg: Steel Warrior =

- UK VHS cover
- Directed by: Boaz Davidson
- Written by: Bill Crounse (screenplay); Boaz Davidson (story); Brent V. Friedman (screenplay); Christopher Pearce (story); Don Pequignot (screenplay)
- Produced by: Amnon Globus, Yoram Globus, Menahem Golan, Marcos Szwarcfiter
- Starring: Joe Lara; Nicole Hansen; John Saint Ryan; Uri Gavriel
- Cinematography: Avraham Karpick
- Edited by: Alain Jakubowicz
- Music by: Blake Leyh
- Production company: Global Pictures
- Distributed by: Cannon Films
- Release date: January 7, 1994
- Running time: 94 mins
- Country: United States
- Language: English
- Box office: $447,784 (US)

American Cyborg: Steel Warrior is a 1993 American science fiction action film directed by Boaz Davidson and released by Global Pictures. John Ryan plays the android assassin in the future to kill Mary, a woman who was able to give life to a fetus played by Nicole Hansen. Joe Lara plays Austin, a mercenary who is actually a cyborg, but vows to protect Mary.

American Cyborg: Steel Warrior was the 3rd to last film to be theatrically released by Cannon, before Hellbound and Chain of Command.

== Premise ==
After World War III, people are sterile and ruled by the artificial intelligences they created in this violent world. The only woman who was able to give life to a fetus has to take it through the dangerous city of Charleston, South Carolina to the port where a ship is on its way to Europe. She is followed by an android assassin through all the dangers, and only one man tries to help her survive and protect her from the killing machine.

== Cast ==
- Joe Lara as Austin (cyborg)
- Nicole Hansen as Mary
- John Saint Ryan as Android Assassin (John Ryan)
- Yosef Shiloach as Akmir
- Uri Gavriel as Leech Leader
- Hellen Lesnick as Carp
- Andrea Litt as Arlene
- Jack Widerker as Dr. Ben Buckley
- Kevin Patterson as Runner Underground Lab Worker
- P.C. Frieberg as Starving Old Man
- Nicole Berger as Hooker
- Allen Nashman as Underground Lab Scientist
- Jack Adalist as Main Thug
- David Milton Johnes as Paramedic on Rescue Boat
- Eric Storch as Main Scavenger

== Release ==
American Cyborg: Steel Warrior was released with the same name in the Philippines by Eastern Films on July 9, 1993. In the United States, the film was released on January 7, 1994.

== Reception ==
Megan Hussey of PlanetFury.com acknowledged that the film had been universally panned but admitted "I really enjoyed American Cyborg: Steel Warrior. Sporting a tough, handsome hero, a strong heroine, plenty of action, and a little surprisingly sweet romance".

Dan Webster of The Spokesman-Review included the film on his Top 10 worst of the year list (not ranked)
