= Ezra (2023 film) =

American film by Tony Goldwyn

- Theatrical release poster
- Directed by: Tony Goldwyn
- Written by: Tony Spiridakis
- Produced by: William Horberg; Jon Kilik; Tony Goldwyn; Tony Spiridakis
- Starring: Bobby Cannavale; Rose Byrne; Vera Farmiga; Whoopi Goldberg; Rainn Wilson; Tony Goldwyn; William A. Fitzgerald; Robert De Niro
- Cinematography: Daniel Moder
- Edited by: Sabine Hoffman
- Music by: Carlos Rafael Rivera
- Production companies: Wayfarer Studios; Closer Media
- Distributed by: Bleecker Street
- Release dates: September 9, 2023 (TIFF); May 31, 2024 (United States)
- Running time: 100 minutes
- Country: United States
- Language: English
- Box office: $4.7 million

Ezra is a 2023 American comedy drama film directed by Tony Goldwyn and written by Tony Spiridakis. It stars Bobby Cannavale, Rose Byrne, Vera Farmiga, Whoopi Goldberg, Rainn Wilson, Goldwyn, William A. Fitzgerald, and Robert De Niro.

Ezra premiered at the Toronto International Film Festival on September 9, 2023. The film was released theatrically on May 31, 2024.

== Plot ==
Max Bernal is a former comedy writer turned struggling stand-up comedian living with his father Stan in Hoboken, New Jersey. He does not get along with his former wife Jenna as they often butt heads over how to parent their autistic son Ezra. Ezra struggles to adapt to the outside world, and Max often takes him to comedy clubs with him so he can be his good luck charm, much to Jenna's irritation.

Upon hearing Jenna's lawyer boyfriend Bruce make an off-hand joke about beating Max up, Ezra takes it literally and attempts to warn his father only to be scared in front of an oncoming taxi by a dog. When Ezra refuses to explain what happened, his doctor assumes he was trying to hurt himself and, combined with previous outbursts at school, has him transferred to a special-needs school and an unnecessary medication. When Max voices his objections, he winds up getting a three-month restraining order from seeing his son when he punches the doctor.

Left with no other choice, Max kidnaps Ezra in the middle of the night to protect him from his perceived toxic environment. En route to his friend Nick's cabin in Michigan, Max learns from his manager friend Jayne that a video she posted of a bombed comedy set is in the hands of Jimmy Kimmel, and he wants him to perform on his show provided he and Ezra make the cross-country drive to a Friday audition in Los Angeles.

Meanwhile, the New Jersey police and child services, despite Jenna's insistence on keeping the response as quiet as possible to shield Ezra, send out an Amber alert across the country, forcing Jenna and a reluctant Stan to chase after the pair, during which they are forced to evaluate their separate failures as parents. Upon finding out what Jenna did, Max tries to avoid the cops but gets them lost in the woods at night, causing Ezra to have a panic attack and chastise his father for not being the parent he needed him to be. Max assures Ezra that despite his faults, he's trying to do right by him so that he'll be able to take care of himself when Max can't.

Max and Ezra make it to Los Angeles, but the audition goes off the rails when the F.B.I. arrives to arrest Max seconds before Jenna and Stan show up. As Jenna tries to downplay the situation, Ezra attacks an agent attempting to handcuff Max, who assures him everything will be alright. Later, Max has moved back in with Jenna, and the two proceed to work around Max's lax house arrest to raise Ezra.

In a mid-credit scene, Max, minus Ezra, gets to appear on Jimmy Kimmel Live, and an awkward moment happens back-stage due to how similar Max's court-ordered parole officer looks to Jimmy's assistant Guillermo.

== Cast ==
- Bobby Cannavale as Max Brandel
- Robert De Niro as Stan, Max's father
- Rose Byrne as Jenna, Max's ex-wife
- William A. Fitzgerald as Ezra, Max's son
- Vera Farmiga as Grace, an old friend of Max
- Whoopi Goldberg as Jayne, Max's manager and friend
- Rainn Wilson as Nick, a childhood friend of Max who runs a summer camp
- Tony Goldwyn as Bruce, a hostile lawyer and Jenna's current boyfriend
- Geoffrey Owens as Robert Segal, a talent scout and producer for Jimmy Kimmel Live
- Alex Plank as Dr. Kaplan
- Matilda Lawler as Ruby, Grace's daughter

== Production ==
Writer Tony Spiridakis began to write the script many years before the making of the film. He was inspired by his relationship with his own autistic son and the break-up of his marriage during his son's teenage years. In an interview he said that the film's script was the ultimate product of him realizing he didn't need to "fix" his son's autism. Spiridakis frequently asked his good friend, actor Tony Goldwyn, to read drafts throughout the years. After reworking the script into a final screenplay, Goldwyn read the version and asked to direct the film.

The film was originally announced in May 2022, under the title Inappropriate Behavior. Principal photography occurred in Westwood, New Jersey and Jersey City in September 2022. The creators of the film began the casting process knowing they wanted an autistic actor to play the lead. William Fitzgerald sent in a tape because he wanted to start a YouTube channel and thought it would give him experience. The 15-year-old ended up landing the titular role.

Robert De Niro ultimately accepted the role, saying that the film resonated with him because one of his seven children is autistic. Whoopi Goldberg was asked directly by Goldwyn to join the film, and she accepted even before reading the script.

The film also had multiple autistic crew members on set to ensure its authenticity. Other cast members were directly related to a family member who has autism. Throughout the production, the creators screened different versions to the autism community for feedback.

== Release ==
Ezra had its world premiere at the Toronto International Film Festival on September 9, 2023. In November 2023, Bleecker Street acquired U.S. distribution rights to the film.

The film was released theatrically in the United States on May 31, 2024.

== Reception ==
On the review aggregator website Rotten Tomatoes, 69% of 89 critics' reviews are positive, with an average rating of 6.3/10. The website's consensus reads: "Good performances give Ezra a resonant emotional core even when its script strains credulity, balancing out into a solid family drama." Metacritic, which uses a weighted average, assigned the film a score of 57 out of 100, based on 16 critics, indicating "mixed or average" reviews.
