= Ash Tuesday =

- Directed by: Jim Hershleder
- Written by: Tony Spiridakis
- Produced by: Shannon Goldman; Tony Spiridakis
- Starring: Janeane Garofalo; Giancarlo Esposito; Tony Goldwyn
- Cinematography: Bill Marley
- Edited by: Charly Bender
- Music by: Peter Himmelman
- Production companies: Rockville Pictures aWounded Knee
- Release date: May 9, 2003 (Tribeca)
- Running time: 83 minutes
- Country: United States

Ash Tuesday (also known as Beyond the Ashes) is a 2003 comedy drama film directed by Jim Hershleder, written by Tony Spiridakis, and starring Janeane Garofalo, Giancarlo Esposito, and Tony Goldwyn. The film is an ensemble piece about several New Yorkers coping with the effects of the September 11 attacks, and was one of the first films to incorporate the events of 9/11 into its story.

The film had its world premiere at the 2003 Tribeca Festival.

== Plot ==
The film is narrated by Punch, a cab driver who experiences an unexplained ringing in his head. Samantha, an introverted new transplant to New York, works at a dive bar where singer Gina Mascara provides the night's entertainment. After Gina and Samantha get to know each other, they sleep together and begin a relationship. There is also homeless poet, Karl, who becomes drawn to Liz, a music critic who hasn't left her apartment since she saw one of the planes crash into the Twin Towers.

== Cast ==
- Janeane Garofalo as Liz
- Giancarlo Esposito as Karl
- Tony Spiridakis as Eddie "Punch" Rizzo
- Nicole Hansen ("Nikki") as Judy
- Tony Goldwyn as Elliott
- Dov Davidoff as Billy Boy
- Pauley Perrette as Gina Mascara
- Jennifer Carpenter as Samantha
- Michael E. Knight as Mitchell
- Adam Ferrara as Greg

== Reception ==
In his review for eFilmCritic.com, Erik Childress wrote, "No one is ever going to mistake Ash Tuesday with the deep subtext inherent in 25th Hour, but it still co-exists as a nice ensemble piece that takes on considerable more depth once all the dots take connection. Spiridakis succeeds by not revealing all his cards too soon nor even by the film's end as it will take a few keen observations to see how the parallel paths all come to intersect." Of the cast, Childress opined, "Garofalo and Esposito somehow find a way through the clowniness to create sympathetic portraits of people who may be relying on excuses to govern their behavior", and "Jennifer Carpenter (in her film debut) does a nice job in conveying the secrets of a soul on a journey with no clear destination. The way she handles the brash Gina in her revelatory moments of truth are standout highlights."

Ronnie Scheib of Variety reviewed the film negatively, writing it "feels like an existential play poorly adapted for the screen." He added, "Only Giancarlo Esposito’s role — that of a down-and-out street poet extravagantly smitten with Janeane Garofalo’s spinsterish shut-in — dovetails with helmer Jim Hershleder’s hyper-real approach."

== Home media ==
The film was released on DVD by Vanguard Cinema on August 30, 2005.
