= Coneheads =

Saturday Night Live comedy sketch with aliens

The Coneheads are a fictional family of extraterrestrials with bald conical heads, created for a series of recurring sketches on Saturday Night Live (SNL). They first appeared on the January 15, 1977 episode hosted by Ralph Nader (episode 35: season 2 episode 11). They are portrayed by Dan Aykroyd as father Beldar, Jane Curtin as mother Prymaat, and Laraine Newman as daughter Connie. In 1993, they appeared in a feature film with Michelle Burke playing Connie.

== Summary ==
The Coneheads are natives of the planet Remulak, stranded on Earth. Their distinguishing feature is the tops of their heads, shaped like large, bald cones. The father's name is Beldar; his wife is Prymaat, and their teenage daughter is Connie. Beldar and Prymaat sometimes use the pseudonyms Fred and Joyce.

Beldar states his occupation as "timekeeper of Remulak"; this means he is a spy tasked with alerting his home planet to the optimum time for an invasion of Earth, which he fails to do. At one point he reveals that Remulak's invasion will turn Earth into "a minor refueling station for the Emperor's Star Cruisers". Connie is assimilating with Earthlings through association with her peers at school, and some family stress is caused by her desire to live as a typical Earth teenager. Beldar gives his family a cover story to explain their strange behavior by saying that they are "from France".

On two sketches, we meet the family's superior Kuldroth (played by John Belushi), and his right-hand man Merkon (played Garrett Morris).

== Physiology ==
The Coneheads speak in a very fast, nasal monotone. Their speech is characterized by the failure to understand idioms used by native English speakers, and their unnecessarily formal use of the language. They refer to food as "consumables", and say "I summon you" when asking to speak to another person. The adults refer to Connie as "the young one" and themselves as her "parental units". They will say "Maintain low tones!" (one of their catchphrases) when voices rise in heated family discussions. They use the word "Mebs!" as an expletive when highly upset.

The Coneheads have much larger appetites than Earthlings, eating large amounts of food during meals (which they identify by another one of their catchphrases, "consuming mass quantities"). They drink entire six-packs of beer at once, and smoke whole packs of cigarettes at a time. On the 1977 Halloween episode (October 29), a neighbor complains about their choice of trick-or-treat handouts: beer and fried eggs. They also consume substances and items inedible to Earthlings, such as cleaning fluid, pencil shavings, and fiberglass insulation.

Coneheads have sex by rubbing their cones together and placing "senso-rings" over them. When the neighbors bring a dessert bundt cake to a dinner invitation, Beldar, who takes it to be an edible senso-ring, grabs it and shouts, "No! Not in front of the young ones!"

== Conceptual origins ==
Dan Aykroyd said he was inspired to create the Coneheads by marijuana consumption and based the characters' appearance on the Moai, the mysterious and ancient stone statues of Easter Island, which have similarly long heads, and the (LSD-inspired) people of the Land of Point from Harry Nilsson's fable The Point!. Aykroyd also mentioned in an interview that he drew inspiration from This Island Earth, in which the very tall foreheads of the movie's aliens go largely unnoticed by humans.

== Music ==
Frank Zappa wrote a song based on the sketches, titled "Conehead". It appeared on his 1981 album You Are What You Is. When he hosted SNL, Zappa also appeared in a Coneheads sketch as a man dating Connie, where he makes note that he prefers French women.

== SNL appearances ==
- January 15, 1977: The Coneheads at Home (Host: Ralph Nader)
- February 26, 1977: The Coneheads at Home (Host: Steve Martin)
- March 26, 1977: The Farbers Meet The Coneheads (Host: Jack Burns)
- April 16, 1977: The Coneheads At Home (Host: Elliott Gould)
- May 21, 1977: Return Of The Coneheads (Host: Buck Henry)
- October 29, 1977: Return Of The Coneheads (Host: Charles Grodin)
- January 21, 1978: Family Feud (Host: Steve Martin)
- March 18, 1978: The Coneheads On Earth (Host: Jill Clayburgh)
- May 13, 1978: Cone Encounters Of The Third Kind (Host: Richard Dreyfuss)
- October 21, 1978: The Coneheads At Home (Host: Frank Zappa)
- February 24, 1979: The Coneheads At The Movies (Host: Kate Jackson)
- May 20, 1989: The New Coneheads, a mock reboot of the original sketches starring Phil Hartman, Nora Dunn, and Victoria Jackson, meant to parody television reboots and very special episodes (Host: Steve Martin)

== Other appearances ==
Conehead type helmets appeared in Luge at the 1976 Winter Olympics with the East German team. The International Luge Federation would ban those helmets later that decade for safety reasons.

One of the Coneheads' first outings outside of SNL was on a 1982 TV special promoting the movie E.T. the Extra-Terrestrial. Aykroyd, Newman and Morris portray Beldar, Connie and Merkon respectively, for a skit with host Robin Williams.

The concept was turned into a Rankin/Bass animated special, The Coneheads, which aired October 14, 1983 on NBC. Aykroyd, Curtin and Newman voice their respective characters.

A live-action film, Coneheads, released in 1993, starring Aykroyd and Curtin. Michelle Burke took over the role of Connie in the film, with Newman appearing as Connie's aunt on Remulak. Marvel Comics produced a comic book limited series, with all-original stories set after the events of the film. The feature film was licensed to Playmates Toys and a line of action figures was created, designed by the development team from Pangea Corporation, but was a box-office bomb.

In May 2015, State Farm Insurance created a Conehead-themed parody of its signature "State of Unrest" (aka "Jake from State Farm") commercial with Aykroyd and Curtin reprising their Coneheads roles. A second commercial, with Aykroyd, Curtin and Newman, sees the Coneheads on their spaceship, summoning their State Farm representative by singing the company's jingle.

== See also ==
- Recurring Saturday Night Live characters and sketches
- Artificial cranial deformation mirroring how the Conheads look like
