= If Lucy Fell =

- Theatrical release poster
- Directed by: Eric Schaeffer
- Screenplay by: Eric Schaeffer
- Story by: Eric Schaeffer; Tony Spiridakis
- Produced by: Brad Krevoy; Steve Stabler; Bradley Jenkel
- Starring: Sarah Jessica Parker; Eric Schaeffer; Ben Stiller; Elle Macpherson; James Rebhorn
- Cinematography: Ron Fortunato
- Edited by: Susan Graef
- Music by: Amanda Kravat; Charlton Pettus
- Production companies: TriStar Pictures; Motion Picture Corporation of America
- Distributed by: Sony Pictures Releasing
- Release date: March 8, 1996
- Running time: 92 minutes
- Country: United States
- Language: English
- Budget: $5 million
- Box office: $2,420,162

If Lucy Fell is a 1996 American romantic comedy film written and directed by Eric Schaeffer, who also co-stars in the film alongside Sarah Jessica Parker, Ben Stiller and Elle Macpherson. It was released on DVD on January 30, 2001.

== Plot ==
Joe MacGonaughgill and Lucy Ackerman are roommates and best friends living in a small Manhattan apartment. Lucy is turning thirty and her love life is embarrassingly dull. Joe, on the other hand, is infatuated with his attractive neighbor Jane. Lucy then decides to form a death pact with Joe like they'd had back in college. If they do not both find true love by the time Lucy turns thirty, they will jump off the Brooklyn Bridge.

Jane comes to an artwork show of Joe's where Joe finally gathers up the courage to ask her out, while Lucy begins dating Bwick Elias, a weirdo artist who paints with his own body parts. Joe soon realizes that Jane isn't who he thought she ought to be. Bwick also turns out to be "no Joe" for Lucy. At this point, Joe and Lucy realize they are perfect for each other.

== Cast ==
- Sarah Jessica Parker as Lucy Ackerman
- Eric Schaeffer as Joe MacGonauhgill
- Elle Macpherson as Jane Lindquist
- Ben Stiller as Bwick Elias
- James Rebhorn as Simon Ackerman
- Robert John Burke as Handsome Man
- David Thornton as Ted
- Bill Sage as Dick
- Dominic Chianese as Al
- Scarlett Johansson as Emily

== Production ==
In January 1995, it was announced Eric Schaeffer would write, direct, and co-star in If Lucy Fell, described as a post-Gen X romance, for the Motion Picture Corporation of America.

== Reception ==
If Lucy Fell earned mostly negative reviews from critics, holding an 18% rating on Rotten Tomatoes based on 28 reviews.

Roger Ebert of the Chicago Sun-Times, gave the film one out of four stars, writing:

[Eric Schaeffer] is obviously a smart guy. Why does he play dumb? What's with the goofy blue hats he wears throughout the film? And the doofus haircut? And the self-referential dialogue? And why does he betray himself at the end with lines like "You figured out the girl in your heart isn't the girl in your dreams"? ... I'd like to see a Schaeffer movie in which he plays a guy as smart as he is; in which he takes the risk of wanting to make a good film, instead of hiding behind irony.
