= Tony Spiridakis =

American actor

- Born: 1959 (age 66–67); Queens, New York City, US
- Education: Yale University (BFA)
- Occupations: Writer, producer, director, actor, playwright
- Children: 2

Tony Spiridakis (born 1959 in Queens, New York City) is an American Greek film director, writer, actor, producer and playwright best known for such films as Queens Logic, Tinseltown, The Last Word, If Lucy Fell and Ash Tuesday. He is the writer of Ezra, which he produced with director Tony Goldwyn, William Horberg, and Jon Kilik. The film, which stars Bobby Cannavale, Robert DeNiro, Rose Byrne, Whoopi Goldberg and Vera Farmiga, follows a struggling comedian and his autistic son on a cross-country road trip. It premiered at the Toronto International Film Festival and is being released theatrically by Bleecker Street nationwide in May 2024.

Spiridakis has developed scripts for Dustin Hoffman, Richard Dreyfuss, and Diane Keaton as well as for iconic producers such as Laura Ziskin, Stacey Snider, Mary Parent, and Warren Littlefield. Other films include Tinseltown, based on his acclaimed play Self Storage, both starring Ron Perlman and Joe Pantoliano; Noise, which he directed and produced, starring Ally Sheedy and John Slattery; the documentary road trip film Driving to Ground Zero; and If Lucy Fell, starring Sarah Jessica Parker and Ben Stiller. Spiridakis’ play The Last Word had a successful run in Los Angeles before he adapted, produced, and directed the film starring Timothy Hutton. His post-9/11 drama, Beyond The Ashes, co-starred Spiridakis with Giancarlo Esposito, Janeane Garofalo, and Tony Goldwyn.

Spiridakis’ TV credits include co-creating and producing the Fox series The Heights with Academy Award-winning screenwriter Eric Roth, the CBS crime drama Falcone with Academy Award-winning screenwriter Robert Moresco, and the Netflix legal drama Justice with Emmy-winning writer William Finkelstein. Spiridakis studied at the Yale School of Drama and has appeared in dozens of TV and films, including House, L.A. Law, The Equalizer, Bay City Blues, and Death Wish 3. Additionally, he produced and acted in Academy and Tony Award-winning writer Doug Wright’s play Callbacks and worked with Stanley Kubrick on the film Full Metal Jacket.

Currently, Spiridakis is a writer and consulting producer on the MGM+ apocalyptic drama series Earth Abides, based on the 1949 sci-fi novel by George R. Stewart.. He is also adapting Sandy Greenberg’s acclaimed memoir, Hello Darkness, My Old Friend, for Wayfarer Studios. Projects in development include The Angry One, Sospiro Di Vita (Breath of Life), and Mike's Place, the true story of a blues bar in Tel Aviv during the Second Intifada that survives the devastation of a suicide bombing, for director Todd Komarnicki, with Antoine Fuqua and Andrew Levitas producing.

A longtime educator who is passionate about working with emerging filmmakers, Spiridakis is the Founder and Executive Director of the North Fork Arts Center in Greenport, N.Y. In 2012 he co-founded the Manhattan Film Institute, a film workshop and mentorship program that has produced nearly 300 short films and transformed the lives of many filmmakers.

Spiridakis is a father of two and a strong advocate for autism awareness.

== Partial filmography ==
=== Film ===
| Year | Title | Role |
|---|---|---|
| 1985 | Death Wish 3 | Angel |
| 1990 | Pacific Heights | actor |
| 1991 | Queens Logic | Vinny (also writer) |
| 1995 | The Last Word | Director, writer |
| 1996 | If Lucy Fell | Story |
| 1997 | Tinseltown | Director, writer |
| 2002 | Driving to Ground Zero | Director, writer |
| 2003 | Ash Tuesday | Punch (also writer) |
| 2004 | Noise | Director |
| 2023 | Ezra | Producer, writer |
| TBA | Mike's Place | Writer |
| TBA | Breath of Life | Director, writer |

=== Television ===
| Year | Title | Role | Notes |
|---|---|---|---|
| 1983 | Bay City Blues | Lee Jacoby | |
| 1986 | Harem | General Mustafa | TV miniseries |
| 1986 | The Equalizer | Terrorist | Episode: "Breakpoint" |
| 1990 | Hometown Boy Makes Good | Chuck Frazier | |
| 1991 | Monsters | Hercules Valvalotus | |
| 1992 | The Heights | | Co-creator |
| 2000 | Falcone | | Writer. Episodes: "Lealta" & "... But Not Forgotten" |
| 2007 | House | Ben | Episode: "Resignation" |
| 2017 | Justice: Qalb Al Adala | Oberman | TV movie. Writer |
| 2018 | Greenport | Tom Wood | also co-creator |
| 2023 | Earth Abides | | Writer, consulting producer |
