= Tunnel Vision (1976 film) =

1976 comedy film directed by Neal Israel and Bradley R. Swirnoff

TunnelVision
- VHS cover
- Directed by: Neal Israel; Bradley R. Swirnoff
- Written by: Neal Israel; Michael Mislove
- Produced by: Joe Roth
- Starring: Roger Bowen; Chevy Chase; John Candy; Howard Hesseman; Joe Flaherty; Laraine Newman; Betty Thomas; Phil Proctor; Al Franken; Ron Silver; Tom Davis
- Music by: Dennis Lambert; Brian Potter
- Distributed by: World Wide Pictures
- Release date: March 1976
- Running time: 68 minutes
- Language: English
- Box office: $4.35 million (U.S. and Canada rentals)

TunnelVision (also known as Tunnel Vision) is a satirical 1976 sketch comedy anthology film featuring Roger Bowen, Chevy Chase, John Candy, Howard Hesseman, Joe Flaherty, Laraine Newman, Betty Thomas, Phil Proctor, Al Franken, Ron Silver, Tom Davis, and Michael Overly, with appearances by voiceover artists Ernie Anderson and Danny Dark. It was directed by Neal Israel and Bradley R. Swirnoff and produced by Joe Roth.

Although the title is repeatedly displayed in the film as being spelled "Tunnelvision", it is frequently identified as "Tunnel Vision" in home video reissues.

== Plot ==
In the then-future year of 1985, a new television network called TunnelVision is entirely free of censorship (aided by a new Bill of Rights, written in 1983), and has thus become the most-watched channel in history. The president of TunnelVision (Proctor) is under Senate investigation led by a Senator (Hesseman) who wishes to shut down the channel due to its perceived widespread negative effects on the population. (Al Franken, who in real life was later elected to the Senate, appears in one of the segments.) The bulk of the film consists of mostly unconnected bits: commercials, shorts, and trailers for fictional movies, shown during a Congressional Oversight Committee hearing as a representative day of TunnelVision programming. At the end of the film, the committee finds in favor of TunnelVision, but the network president is shot and killed by a crazed French chef who had been a running gag throughout the film.

== Segments ==
TunnelVision programming spoofs various popular films and television shows of the day, including:

- "Remember When": A game show where contestants must answer embarrassing personal questions truthfully or receive electric shocks.
- "Young Peoples After School Press Conference": Henry Kissinger (Bowen) appears on a children's show and is upstaged by a foul-mouthed puppet.
- "Get Head!": An action-adventure drama starring a disembodied head as an undercover cop.
- "Secret Camera": A Candid Camera parody supposedly presented by the CIA.
- "Ramon and Sonja": A sitcom containing many racial and ethnic stereotypes.
- "Police Comic": A cop show starring a comedian who uses his routine to take down a sniper.
- "The Pregnant Man": A film trailer.
- "The King of TV": The president of a beleaguered network listens to pitches for terrible shows.

Various news broadcasts are also seen, as are commercials for bogus products and services. A "criminals wanted" segment fingers the Pep Boys as robbing 85,000 fans at the Los Angeles Memorial Coliseum during a Los Angeles Rams-Minnesota Vikings game in 1981.

One public service announcement features a nude Dody Dorn, who later became an award-winning film editor. Another involves Vitabrain Capsulised Library, vitamins containing classic literature.

The closing credits contain the following disclaimer: "This film is intended as a comic parody of commercial television programming. The persons and scenes shown are presented only in that spirit and not as a serious reflection of reality."

== Reception ==
The New York Times review read, "'Tunnelvision,' it doesn't die alone, it threatens to take you with it."

The film grossed $113,829 in its opening three days from 14 theaters in Chicago (8), Los Angeles (4) and Boston (2).
