= Roar (1997 TV series) =

1997 American fantasy adventure TV series

- Genre: Fantasy; Adventure
- Created by: Shaun Cassidy; Ron Koslow
- Starring: Heath Ledger; Lisa Zane; Sebastian Roché; Vera Farmiga; John Saint Ryan; Alonzo Greer
- Theme music composer: Jon Ehrlich
- Countries of origin: United States; Australia
- Original language: English
- No. of seasons: 1
- No. of episodes: 13 (5 unaired)

Production
- Executive producers: Shaun Cassidy; Ron Koslow; Michael Nankin
- Producer: Howard Grigsby
- Production locations: Queensland, Australia
- Running time: 60 minutes
- Production companies: Sea Change Productions; Universal Television

Original release
- Network: Fox
- Release: July 14 – September 1, 1997

Roar is a fantasy adventure television series created by Shaun Cassidy and Ron Koslow. The series originally aired on the Fox network from July 14 until September 1, 1997. It is set in the year 400 AD, following a young Irish man, Conor (Heath Ledger), as he sets out to rid his land of the invading Romans, but in order to accomplish this, he must first unite the Celtic clans. The series also starred Vera Farmiga, Lisa Zane, John Saint Ryan, and Sebastian Roché. Roar was cancelled after eight episodes due to low ratings, and the final five episodes were not broadcast by the network until 2000.

== Plot ==
Roar chronicles the life of Conor (Ledger), a 20-year-old orphaned prince who must rise above tragedy to lead his people to freedom. Conor takes on a band of ragtag allies that include Tully (Greer), a teenage apprentice magician; Catlin (Farmiga), a beautiful former slave; and Fergus (Ryan), Conor's big-hearted, ebullient protector. Their primary struggle is against Longinus (Roché), a supernatural creature whose true essence is that of a 400-year-old Roman centurion ready to do the bidding of evil Queen Diana (Zane), who is an emissary of the Romans. In this fight for freedom, what is most important for Conor and his people is the Roar – the roar of the land, the roar of the people – a voice that echoes through every living creature and is the power of life.

== Production ==
=== Development ===
The show was created by Shaun Cassidy on the heels of the success of the syndicated programs Hercules: The Legendary Journeys and Xena: Warrior Princess. However, Roar was not very well received in the United States and lasted for only one season (eight of the 13 episodes were aired in 1997, with the last five not broadcast until 2000).

=== Alignment with Christian tradition ===
One of the major villains in the program was Longinus, played by Sebastian Roché, an immortal cursed by God for interfering with his plans. By Christian tradition, Longinus was the centurion who stabbed Jesus Christ with his spear during the Crucifixion. This spear, the Spear of Destiny, was supposedly the only weapon that could release Longinus from his curse. The show freely mixed Christian mythology, Celtic mythology, Druidism, and smatterings of history.

=== Show notes ===
- While the original airing of the show in North America did not broadcast all of the episodes, when syndicated to Australia, Canada and the UK, all episodes were aired.
- Roar: The Complete Series was released on DVD on September 19, 2006. The 3-disc set includes all thirteen episodes.
- According to Sebastian Roché, the show was cancelled because it was up against Buffy the Vampire Slayer

== Cast ==
=== Main ===
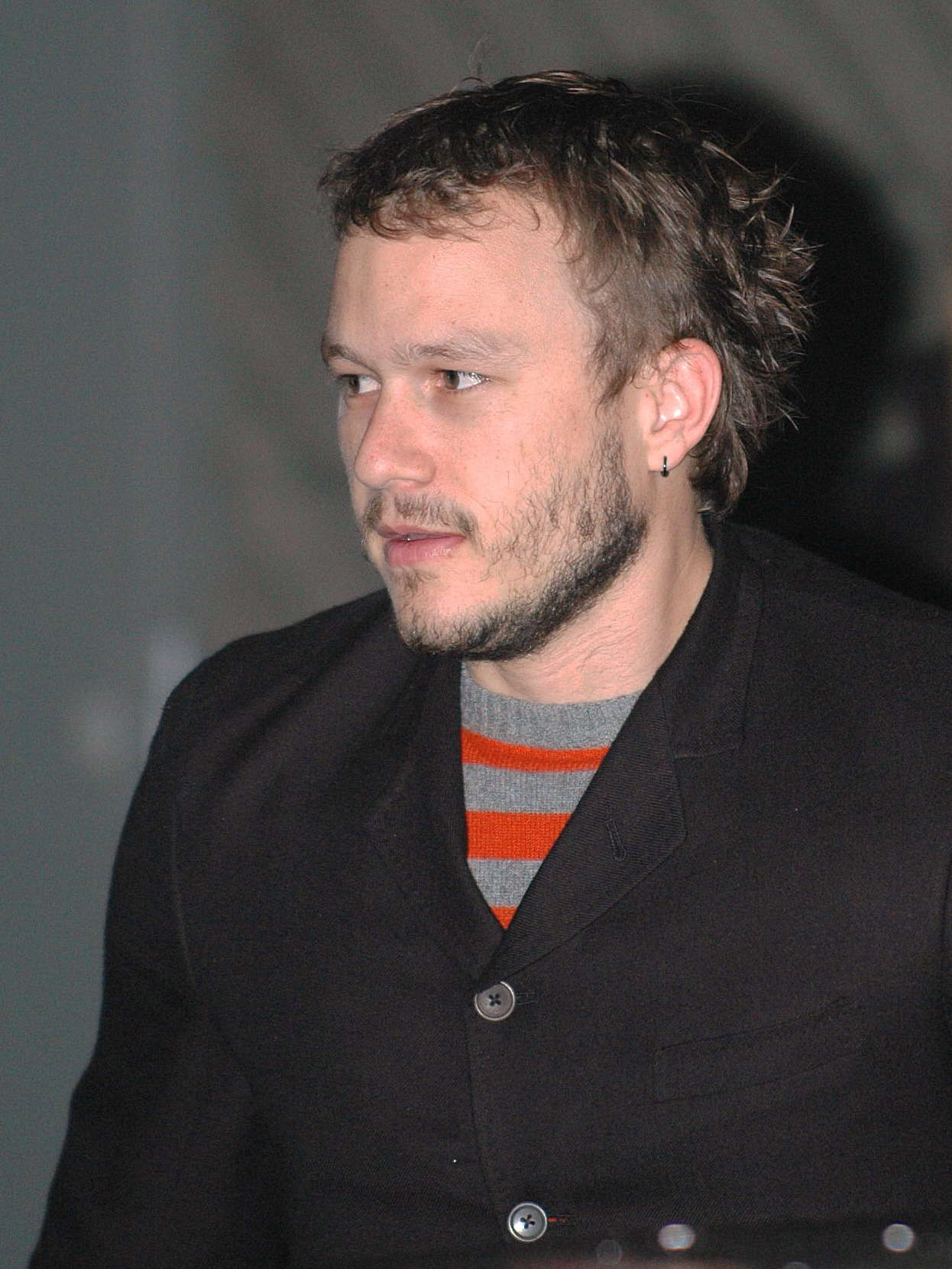
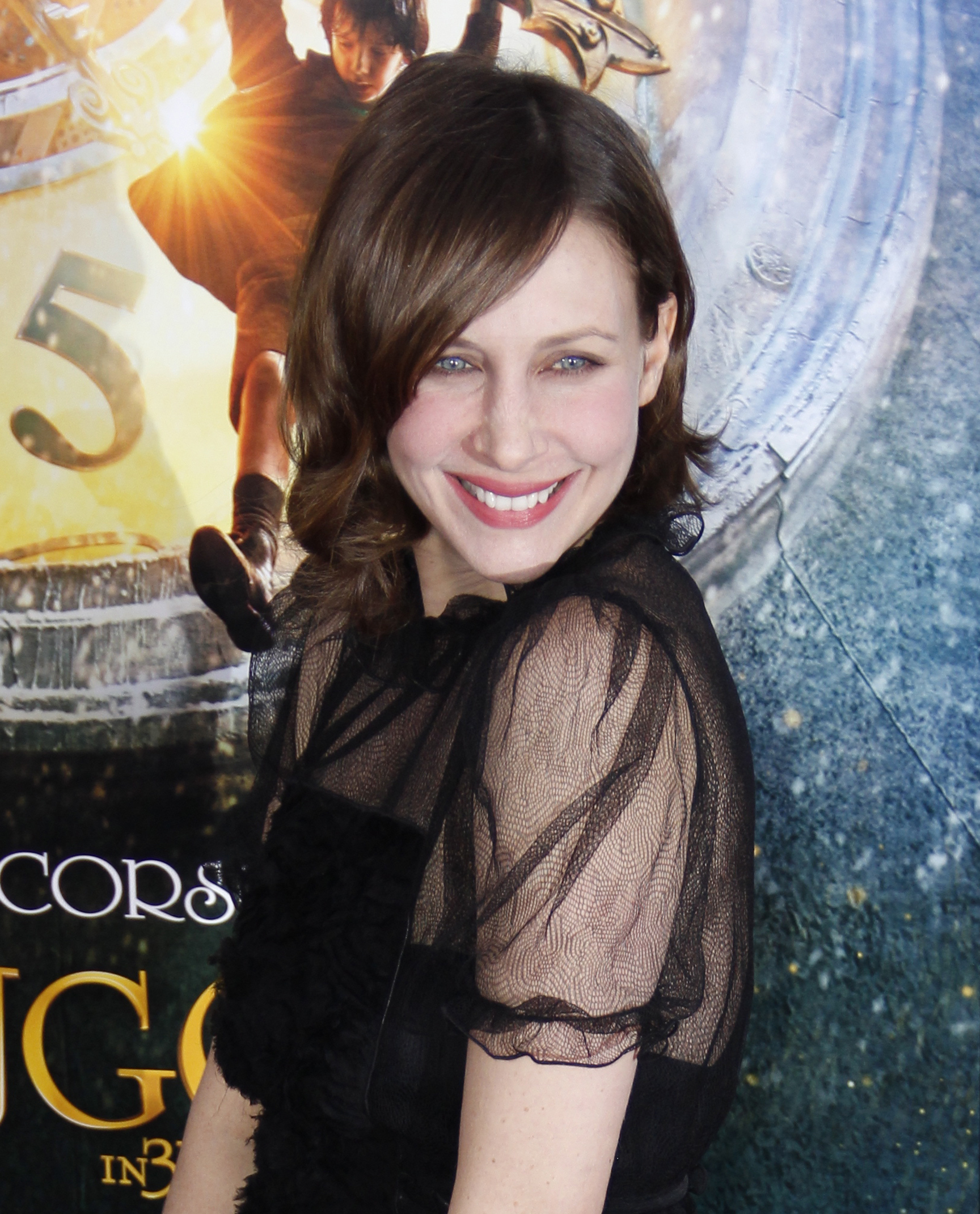
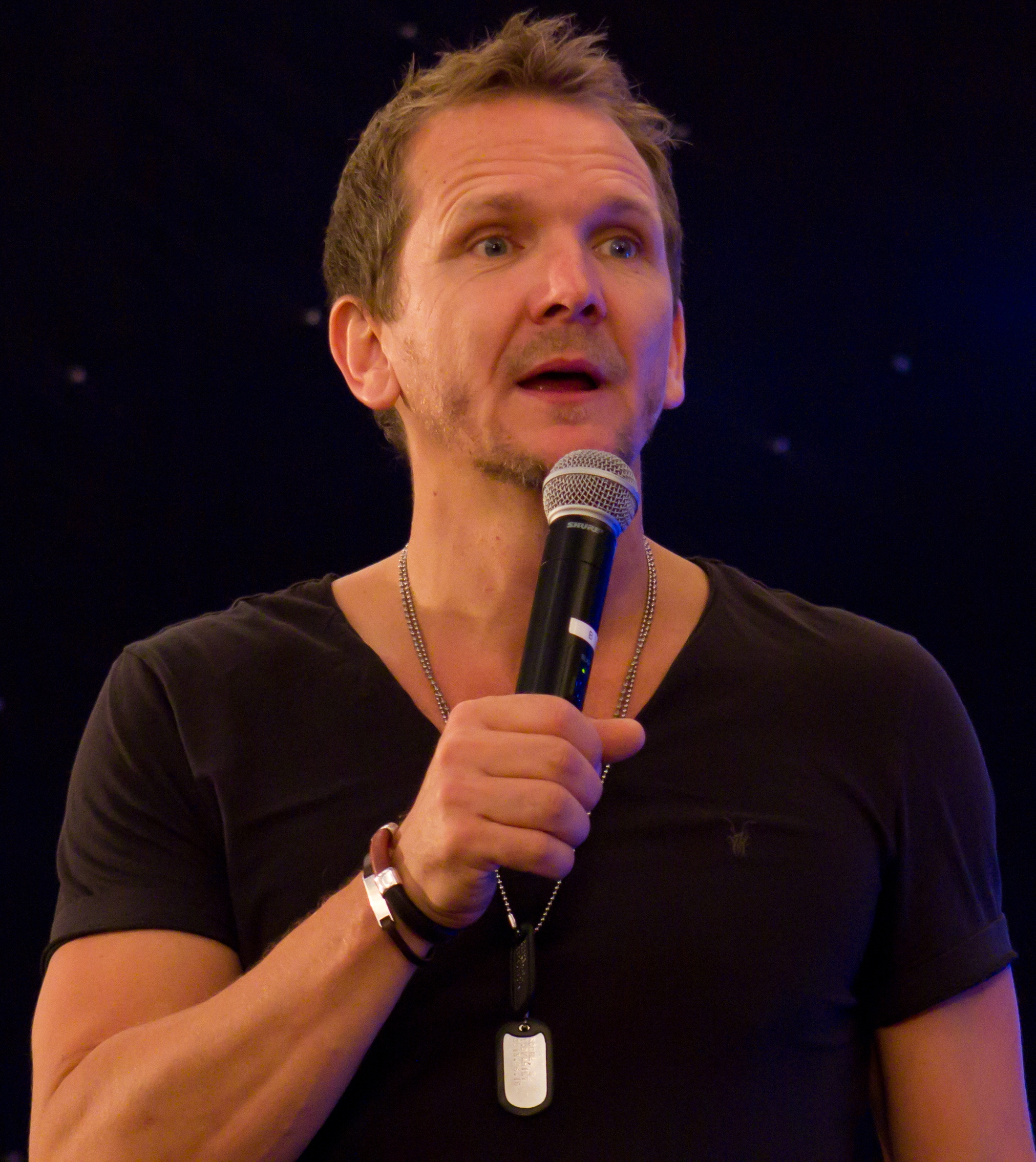
Heath Ledger, Vera Farmiga, and Sebastian Roché (left to right) portrayed lead roles, Conor, Catlin, and Longinus, respectively.
- Heath Ledger as Conor
- Lisa Zane as Queen Diana
- Sebastian Roché as Gaius Cassius Longinus
- Vera Farmiga as Catlin
- John Saint Ryan as Fergus
- Alonzo Greer as Tully

=== Recurring ===
- Michael Roughan as The Slavemaster
- Melissa George as Molly
- Carl Snell as Glas (The Father)
- Keri Russell as Claire
- Daniel Gecic as King Derek
- Peter McCauley as Culann / Brach

=== Guests ===
- Barry McEvoy as Dunn (1 episode)
- Bec Hewitt as Young Caitlin (1 episode)
- Brigid Brannagh as Shannon (1 episode)
- Brooke Harman as Amalia (1 episode)
- Deborra-Lee Furness as Agrona (1 episode)
- Desmond Kelly as Furbaide (1 episode)
- Don McManus as Doyle (1 episode)
- Gabrielle Fitzpatrick as Vorgeen (1 episode)
- Grant Dodwell as Cormac (1 episode)
- Jason Carter as Pasolinus (1 episode)
- Justin Monjo as Julian (1 episode)
- Michela Noonan as Edain (1 episode)
- Norman Kaye as Galen (1 episode)
- Perry Anzilotti as Malachy (1 episode)
- Peter McCauley as Culann / Brach (2 episodes)
- Robert Carlton as Morvern (1 episode)
- Simon Lyndon as Colm (1 episode)
- Susanna Thompson as Gweneth (1 episode)
- Tiriel Mora as Brigg (1 episode)
- Wayne Pygram as Goll (1 episode)

== Episodes ==
No.	Title	Directed by	Written by	Original release date
1	"Pilot"	Ralph Hemecker	Shaun Cassidy & Ron Koslow	July 14, 1997
When he loses his family and the woman he loves, Prince Conor sets out on a quest for revenge against the ones who killed them. Conor's friend and mentor, the magician Galen, teaches him how to hear the "roar" of the land and shows him another destiny to follow. The Roman legions coming to take over the land are led by Queen Diana, a Roman woman who married a Celtic king, and the wizard Longinus, who is the soldier who killed Christ on the cross and is now cursed with immortality. Joined by Fergus, a warrior of his own tribe, Tully, a young man raised by Galen, and Catlin, a former Roman slave, he sets out to unite the Celtic tribes and fight the Romans.
2	"Projector"	Rick Rosenthal	Larry Barber & Paul Barber	July 21, 1997
A traveling merchant tries to sell "atmos", a primitive form of gunpowder. There is a struggle to see who will control this new power called science, the Romans or the Celtic tribes.
3	"The Chosen"	Ian Toynton	John Kirk	July 28, 1997
A young boy is chosen as the leader of the druids, a mythical magical priesthood of the ancient Celts, known as the "Father". But there are those who wish to control or do the boy harm before he reaches the druid temple.
4	"Banshee"	Lou Antonio	Lawrence Meyers	August 4, 1997
While making an alliance with another clan Conor and the others meet a beautiful woman. She turns out to be a banshee who has foreseen one of their deaths.
5	"Doyle's Solution"	Tucker Gates	Story by : Lawrence Meyers; Teleplay by : Lawrence Meyers, Shaun Cassidy & Michael Nankin	August 11, 1997
Conor and Fergus run into a man named Doyle who has "adopted" a group of children around him including a beautiful young woman Molly, who is Fergus' daughter. But they soon realize that Doyle may not be as good and peaceful as he seems.
6	"Red Boot"	Thomas J. Wright	Larry Barber & Paul Barber	August 18, 1997
A Roman soldier comes to the island to find a document and conceal the truth that is important to the Christian faith. A big secret is revealed about Catlin's faith.
7	"The Spear of Destiny"	Jefery Levy	Michael Nankin	August 25, 1997
Fergus tells the story of how Conor found the Spear of Destiny, of its power to corrupt, and of Longinus' attempt to gain everlasting peace by using the spear to kill himself.
8	"The Eternal"	Félix Enríquez Alcalá	Shaun Cassidy & Michael Nankin	September 1, 1997
Conor is summoned by the Father who proposes a marriage for him to a druid novice. Longinus swears to bring down Conor's alliance, and begins to build a base of power, forcing Diana and others to swear allegiance to him.
9	"Tash"	David S. Jackson	John Kirk	2000
Catlin accidentally drops a skull while in Galen's home. Shortly after, she is possessed by an evil spirit, a tash. Conor and Fergus race to save her, only to find that the spirit is none other than Catlin's long lost little sister, and the only way to get her out is to turn to Longinus.
10	"Traps"	Ian Toynton	Lawrence Meyers	2000
Conor and Fergus arrive on an island that says they are interested in trading weapons with them. They are actually, though, selling weapons to Longinus and Diana. Conor and Fergus are given hours to survive the traps. If they do, they go free.
11	"Daybreak"	Ian Toynton	Larry Barber & Paul Barber	2000
When Conor recovers the remains of his family, he makes plans to bury them at his father's village, but thanks to Longinus' interference, he is not welcomed with open arms.
12	"The Cage"	Michael Nankin	Shaun Cassidy & Michael Nankin	2000
Conor and Molly have a dubious romance. They travel to Molly's hometown to meet her mother, who has remarried. This husband is not quite as noble as Fergus. He is a spy for Longinus, and plots to kill Conor. In the end, Diana helps put Longinus in a "cage" that will keep him imprisoned for eternity.
13	"Sweet Brigit"	Jefery Levy	Story by : Shaun Cassidy, Lawrence Meyers & John Kirk; Teleplay by : Shaun Cassidy	May 28, 2000
Newly free from Longinus, everyone celebrates the union of Rome and the Celts. Conor and Fergus, on their way to the celebration meet a man trapped in a hole. Upon helping him out, he leaves them stuck with only the words, "Kiss the clay and you'll be free." Conor kisses the clay only to meet a beautiful young woman who can not speak, and who acts like a child in many ways. They take her in but are soon running from Diana who was threatened. The girl, who Conor names "Brigit", takes a liking to him, but flees one night after setting fire to a soldier. Unable to find her, they go to the man who revealed her to them. He tells them that "Brigit" is a Fire Sprite, and can not be trusted on her own.

== Reception ==
=== Reviews ===
Ray Richmond, a television critic for Variety, gave the series a lukewarm review, "Even 1,500 years ago, it turns out that the Celtics were in need of a decent shooting guard and a big man in the middle. At least, that's what we're told in this adventure drama set in 5th century Europe that follows a ragtag band of Celtic warriors (is there another kind?) and their bloody battles with a group of nasty, oppressive Romans. Think of the Carringtons vs. the Colbys with a lot more leather... and fewer showers. Roar boasts deliciously elaborate costumes (from designer Jean Turnbull) and impeccable period detail. Yet unlike the divertingly cheesy Xena: Warrior Princess and Hercules: The Legendary Journeys, this summertime spectacle takes itself relatively seriously – a mistake when your chief female evildoer has a taste for bathing in cow dung." Hal Boedeker for the Orlando Sentinel gave a positive review, writing, "The young stars are attractive, the action rarely flags, and the show is a rare fresh offering on broadcast television this summer. It is also more rousing than many new hour series this fall."

=== Awards and nominations ===
Year	Award	Category	Recipient(s)	Result
1998	Primetime Emmy Awards	Outstanding Music Composition for a Series (Dramatic Underscore)	Jon Ehrlich (for "Pilot")	Nominated
1998	Golden Reel Awards	Best Sound Editing in Television Episodic – Dialogue & ADR	Norval D. Crutcher III, Marty Vites, Andy Dawson, Robb Navrides (for "Pilot")	Won
1998	Golden Reel Awards	Best Sound Editing in Television Episodic – Dialogue & ADR	Robb Navrides (for "The Spear of Destiny")	Nominated
1999	Australian Cinematographers Society	Telefeatures, TV Drama & Mini Series	John Stokes (for "Red Boot")	Won

== Other media ==
Two books were written based on the Roar universe. Published in 1998, by William T. Quick writing as "Sean Kiernan," Roar: A Novel (ISBN 0-0610-5914-5) gives a backstory leading up to the pilot episode, and Roar: The Cauldron (ISBN 0-0610-5936-6) tells the story of Conor's quest to find the legendary Cauldron.
