= Tom Davis (comedian) =

American screenwriter and comedian (1952-2012)

- Born: Thomas James Davis; August 13, 1952; St. Paul, Minnesota, U.S.
- Died: July 19, 2012 (aged 59); Hudson, New York, U.S.
- Spouse(s): Mimi Raleigh (m. 1991, separated since 1999; his death)

Comedy career
- Years active: 1972–2012
- Medium: Television

Thomas James Davis (August 13, 1952 – July 19, 2012) was an American comedian, writer, and author. He is best known for his comedy partnership with Al Franken, as half of the comedy duo "Franken & Davis" on Saturday Night Live.

== Life and career ==
Davis was born in St. Paul, Minnesota. He attended The Blake School in Minneapolis, Minnesota, where he began his friendship and professional partnership with Al Franken. In 1975, Davis got his big break as one of the original writers for Saturday Night Live where he and Franken also performed together. The duo wrote the screenplay for and appeared in the film One More Saturday Night, and had brief appearances in Trading Places and The Rutles: All You Need Is Cash. Davis was a frequent guest on The Al Franken Show, appearing in sketches as various characters. In a well-known sketch on Saturday Night Live, he provided the voice calling into an interview with Dan Aykroyd's Jimmy Carter as the youngster that Jimmy Carter talked down from a bad trip. Davis created the SNL sketches "Theodoric of York, Medieval Barber" (with Steve Martin), "Nick The Lounge Singer" (with Bill Murray), "The Continental" (with Christopher Walken), and "Coneheads" (with Dan Aykroyd and Jane Curtin).

== Illness and death ==
External videos
- Davis honored on the floor of the U.S. Senate by Sen. Al Franken, July 25, 2012, C-SPAN

In 2009, Davis was diagnosed with cancer. He was treated at Mount Sinai Hospital, New York, where, on March 31, 2009, Dr. Eric Genden with minimally invasive robotic surgery, removed a tumor on Davis' right tonsil that had metastasized to an adjoining lymph node.

Davis died on July 19, 2012, of throat and neck cancer, aged 59.

== Bibliography ==
- Thirty-Nine Years of Short-Term Memory Loss (2009; ISBN 978-0-8021-1880-6)
- Owsley and Me: My LSD Family by Rhoney Gissen Stanley and Tom Davis (2012; ISBN 978-0-9833589-3-0)

== Filmography ==
Year	Title	Role	Notes
1975–1980; 1985-1994	Saturday Night Live	Various	153 episodes, (final appearance)
1976	Tunnel Vision	Tom	
1977	The Paul Simon Special		TV special
1979	Bob & Ray, Jane, Laraine & Gilda	Merry Man	Uncredited
1981	Steve Martin's Best Show Ever		TV special
1983	Trading Places	Baggage Handler #2	
1983	The Coneheads	Barry Paisner	Voice, Animated TV Special
1984	Franken and Davis at Stockton State	Himself	TV special
1984	The New Show	Himself	TV series
1986	One More Saturday Night	Larry Hays	with Al Franken
1989	The Feud	Teammate	
1993	Coneheads	Supplicant	with Dan Aykroyd
1995	Trailer Park	Host	TV series
1998	Blues Brothers 2000	Prison Clerk	
2001	Evolution	Governor's Aide	
