= John Saint Ryan =

English actor, horse trainer and equestrian (1953–2025)

- Born: John Barker; 27 March 1953; Burnley, Lancashire, England
- Died: 3 April 2025 (aged 72)
- Occupations: Actor; equestrian
- Years active: 1983–2025
- Spouse: Joyce Barker
- Children: 3
- Website: johnsaintryan.com

John Barker (27 March 1953 – 3 April 2025), known professionally as John Saint Ryan, was an English actor, horse trainer and equestrian. He appeared in supporting roles in film and television. His more memorable characters include Fergus in the 1997 Fox television series Roar and Myles Standish in Disney's 1994 adventure drama film Squanto: A Warrior's Tale.

== Early life ==
Born John Barker in Burnley, Lancashire, on 27 March 1953, he attended Rosehill Junior School and later became a bookseller and martial arts teacher in the town. He ran and instructed a Muay Thai gym in Preston called "Fighting Fit" prior to getting a role as a stunt double for Sean Connery on the film set The Medicine Man.

== Career ==
Ryan made his acting debut in 1983 in G.B.H. and soon landed a small role in the hit British soap opera Emmerdale (then known as Emmerdale Farm) as Jameson. Ryan appeared in theatre productions of Far from the Madding Crowd and A Streetcar Named Desire, and in supporting roles in films and television series including Coronation Street (as Charlie Whelan), Buffy the Vampire Slayer, General Hospital, Murder, She Wrote, Cybill, and the made-for-TV movie The Heidi Chronicles. Ryan also played the main antagonist Cyborg in American Cyborg: Steel Warrior.

Ryan moved to California in the early 1990s. He owned and operated the "Red Rose Ranch", a working horse and cattle ranch near Inyokern, California, where he raised, boarded, and sold horses. He trained horses and riders in both dressage and western riding; Ryan's specialty was the doma vaquera style of western riding, a Spanish form of competitive Western pleasure riding. He won multiple national and international titles in the sport, and wrote books and produced videos on the doma vaquera style.

== Personal life and death ==
Saint Ryan married Joyce and had three sons. One of them, Samuel Barker (born 1980), is a lighting director and has won Emmy Awards for his work on The Voice. Saint Ryan was a keen supporter of Burnley Football Club.

Saint Ryan died of a heart attack on 3 April 2025, at the age of 72.

== Filmography ==
=== Film ===
Year	Title	Role	Notes
1983	Target Eve Island	Colonel Mitri Petrovich	
1983	G.B.H.	Big Nick Rafferty	
1986	Gunpowder	Platoon Commander	
1986	Into the Darkness	Jeff Conti	Also writer
1991	Cover Up	Mini Barman	
1991	Delta Force 3: The Killing Game	Sergei	
1992	The Eye of Satan	Camille Muhamed	
1992	The Assassinator	Chris McCall	Also writer and producer
1993	American Cyborg: Steel Warrior	Cyborg	
1993	CIA II: Target Alexa	Ralph Straker	
1994	Squanto: A Warrior's Tale	Myles Standish	
1996	The Sweeper	Richman	
2009	The Butcher	Illegal Surgeon	
2019	Out of the Wild	Tom Essex	

=== Television ===
Year	Title	Role	Notes
1986	Scene	Policeman	Episode: "Too Nice by Half!"
1986	MacGyver	Eddie	Episode: "The Assassin"
1986	The Twilight Zone	William	Episode: "The Storyteller"
1987	Emmerdale	C.S.M. Jameson	2 episodes
1987	A Small Problem	Policeman	Episode: "We'll Meet Again. Don't Know Where. Don't Know When"
1987	Floodtide	Capt. Gibson	3 episodes
1987	Coronation Street	Barman	1 episode
1988	Wipe Out	Jean-Marie Leletton	3 episodes
1989	Screen Two	Nightclub Manager	Episode: "Angel Voices"
1992	The Young Indiana Jones Chronicles	Mister Max	Episode: "Austria, March 1917"
1993	SeaQuest DSV	Captain Finius Wideman	Episode: "Knight of Shadows"
1993–1994	Coronation Street	Charlie Whelan	Regular Role; 59 Episodes
1995	The Heidi Chronicles	Nick	Television film
1995	No Greater Love	Titanic Officer	Television film
1995	Murder, She Wrote	Jack Conroy	2 episodes
1995	Babylon 5	Troublemaker	Episode: "A Day in the Strife"
1995	M.A.N.T.I.S.	Druid	Episode: "Ancestral Evil"
1995, 1996	Gargoyles	King Arthur	2 episodes
1996–1997	EZ Streets	Bo	6 episodes
1997	L.A. Heat	Yuri	Episode: "For Whom the Bullet Tolls"
1997	Dark Skies	Colonel Dimitri Mironov	Episode: "Strangers in the Night"
1997	Cybill	Ryan	Episode: "Show Me the Minnie"
1997	Roar	Fergus	13 episodes
1998	Players	Martin Daggett	Episode: "Wrath of Con"
1999	Crusade	Technomage	Episode: "The Memory of War"
2000	Buffy the Vampire Slayer	Colonel George Haviland	Episode: "Superstar"
2001	The Agency	SAS Leader	Episode: "Pilot"
2012	Revolution	Bandit #2	Episode: "Pilot"
