= Dov Davidoff =

American comedian (born 1973)

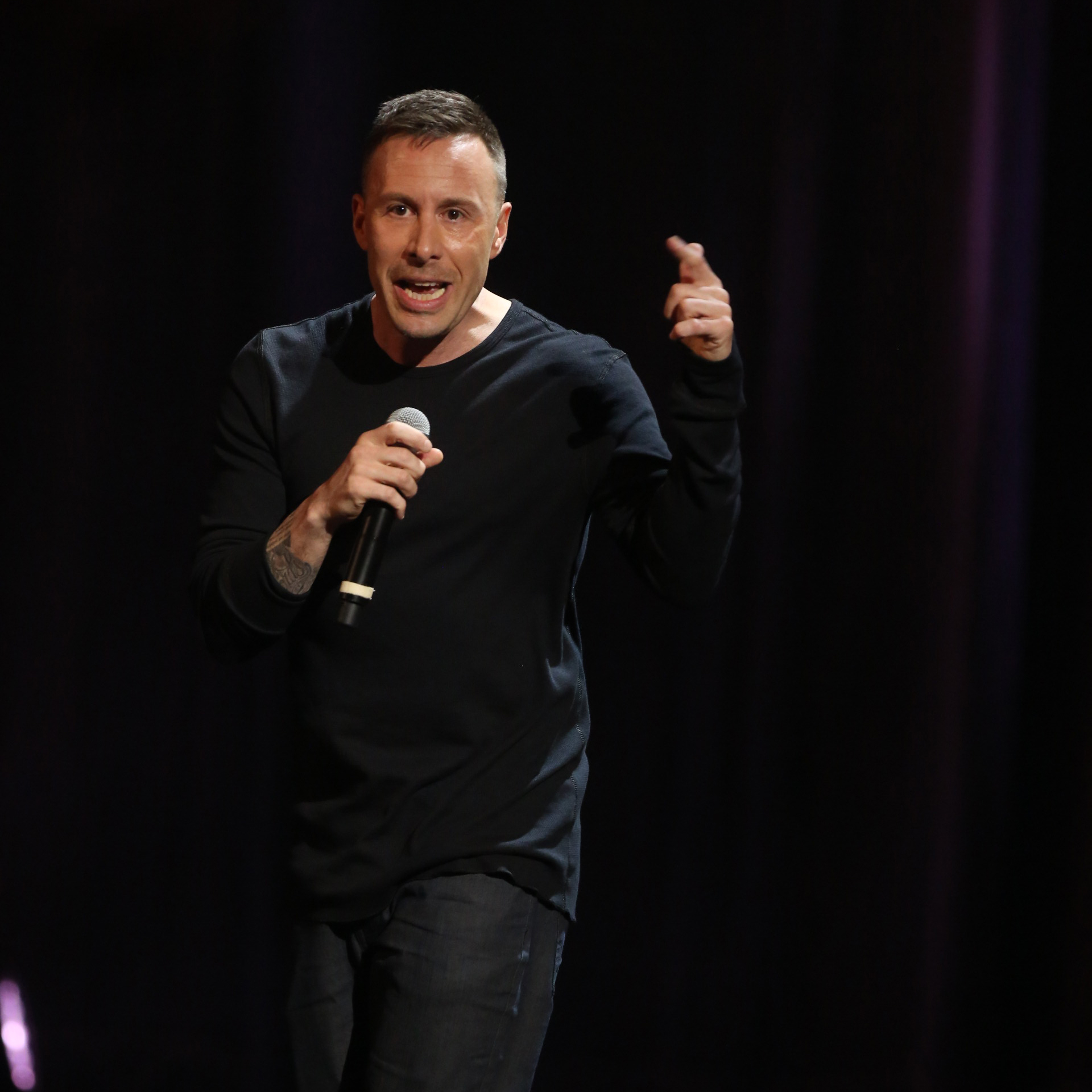
- Davidoff in 2019
- Born: September 22, 1973 (age 52); Englishtown, New Jersey, U.S.
- Occupation: Comedian · actor
- Children: 1

Dov Davidoff (born September 22, 1973) is an American comedian and actor.

== Early life ==
Davidoff was born in Englishtown, New Jersey, where his father owned a junkyard.

== Career ==
In addition to performing in clubs and colleges throughout the country, Davidoff also acted in television shows and Invincible with Mark Wahlberg.

On April 22, 2008, he released a CD entitled "The Point Is.." on Comedy Central Records. His book Road Dog: Life and Reflections from the Road as a Stand-up Comic was self-published via Amazon in October, 2017.

Davidoff guest starred, with Ray Liotta and Jennifer Lopez, on the NBC cop drama Shades of Blue. He is also featured as a recurring role on HBO's Crashing alongside fellow comedian and actor Pete Holmes. Davidoff also was a regular round table guest on Chelsea Handler's show on E! Chelsea Lately.

== Personal life ==
Davidoff married his wife Jessica on May 18, 2016, and she gave birth to the couple's son on November 3, 2018.

== Filmography ==
=== Film ===
Year	Title	Role	Notes
2003	Ash Tuesday	Billy Boy	
2004	Noise	Larry	
2005	Crazy for Love	Door man	
2006	Invincible	Johnny	
2009	Across the Hall	The Bellhop	
2011	Let Go	Greasy Pawn Shop Guy	
2016	The Comedian	Dov Davidoff	
2017	Blackmail	Max	
2019	Hustlers	Manager	

=== Television ===
Year	Title	Role	Notes
2004	Third Watch	Patch Monk	Episode: "Alone Again, Naturally"
2005	Peep Show		Unsold pilot
2006	Law & Order	Darrell Dennehy	Episode: "Family Friend"
2007	Raines	Remi Boyer	7 episodes
2008	Boston Legal	Joe Hellman	Episode: "Roe"
2009	Brothers	Max	Episode: "Mom at Bar/Train Buddy"
2012	Whitney	The Manager	Episode: "Something Old, Something New"
2013	Maron	Dov Davidoff	Episode: "Marc's Dad"
2013	The League	Sergeant Panico	Episode: "Chalupa vs. The Cutlet"
2016	Horace and Pete	Dom	3 episodes
2017	The Punisher	Ricky Langtry	Episode: "Front Toward Enemy"
2017–2018	Shades of Blue	Detective Verco	18 episodes
2017–2019	Crashing	Jason	8 episodes
2025	Law & Order: Organized Crime	Mark Kingman	season 5
