= Little Men (TV series) =

1998 Canadian TV series

- Genre: Historical drama
- Created by: Carl Binder
- Starring: Michelle Rene Thomas; Spencer Rochfort
- Composer: Milan Kymlicka
- Country of origin: Canada
- Original language: English
- No. of seasons: 2
- No. of episodes: 26

Production
- Executive producers: Carl Binder; Meyer Shwarzstein
- Producers: Greg Copeland; John Ryan
- Production location: Pickering, Ontario
- Running time: 60 min

Original release
- Network: CTV (Canada); PAX TV (U.S.)
- Release: November 7, 1998 – December 17, 1999

Little Men is a Canadian television show that first aired on November 7, 1998 on the PAX TV network and was shown in Canada on CTV beginning January 1, 1999. The show is set as a continuation of the Louisa May Alcott novel Little Men (1871), a follow-up to Little Women (1868). Due to low ratings, the show was cancelled after 2 seasons, with the final episode aired on December 17, 1999.

== Synopsis ==
The show opens in Concord, Massachusetts, one month after the death of Jo's husband, Fritz Bhaer. Josephine Bhaer (Michelle Rene Thomas) must take over the Plumfield School, a school in the barn on the Bhaer property, once taught by her husband. As she tries to adjust to the pressures to find a new teacher, a merchant mariner Nick Riley (Spencer Rochfort) enters the scene to act as a caretaker of the school. Franz (Robin Dunne), Jo's nephew, must take over teaching the class of young teens, notably Dan (Corey Sevier), Nat (Trevor Blumas), Emil (Alex Cambell), Nan (Brittney Irvin) and Bess (Rachel Skarsten). The show follows the children's adventures at Plumfield, as well as the blossoming relationship between Jo and Nick. Appearances by the other living March sisters, Meg (Jennifer Wigmore) and Amy (Amy Price-Francis) ground the plot as another chapter in the continuing saga of the March girls of Little Women. Jo's young son, Rob Bhaer, is portrayed by Munro Chambers and his brother Thomas.

== Characters ==
=== Plumfield residents ===
- Josephine "Jo" Bhaer (Michelle Rene Thomas): One of the eponymous Little Woman, Jo is now a young widow following the death of her husband Fritz. She vows to keep her husband's school open, though many feel that she should close it down. She has one son, Rob. Jo often reminisces about her childhood with her sisters, Meg, Amy, and the late Beth. She remains close to her living relatives who continue to support her.
- Nicholas "Nick" Riley (Spencer Rochfort): A merchant marine who comes to work at Plumfield. After he is arrested for assaulting Emil's uncle, Jo arranges for him to serve his sentence at Plumfield. He later decides to stay on permanently as the school's caretaker. Nick had a rough childhood after his parents died in an influenza epidemic when he was twelve. He stayed with his uncle who was abusive towards his wife. At fifteen, he went on his first sea voyage. In "Philanthropy", Nick reveals that he cannot read and Jo begins teaching him.
- Dan Maddison (Corey Sevier): A sponsored student who was once homeless living on the streets of Boston. He survived by partnering with Jasper (Jason McSkimming) and later Nat. In "Tough Crimes", Jasper comes to Plumfield to take Dan to California. Dan soon learns that his friend is an irredeemable criminal and remains at school.
- Nathaniel "Nat" Blake (Trevor Blumas): Dan's best friend. Like Dan, he is a sponsored student. They were homeless together in Boston. Nat tends to be cautious and nervous, though he is capable of great acts of bravery in times of need.
- Anthea "Nan" Harding (Britt Irvin): Jo's first female student. After her mother's death, Nan was unhappy and often ran away from home, which lead her father to send her to Plumfield. A tomboy, she does not get along with the prim and proper Bess at first. They eventually become friends.
- Elizabeth "Bess" Laurence (Rachel Skarsten): Amy and Laurie's only child. Her mother has molded her into an elegant and refined young lady, but her father worries that she has no spirit from spending too much time indoors and not enjoying life.
- Emil Hoffman (Alex Campbell): A student at Plumfield who hopes to be a sailor someday. His uncle pulls him out of Plumfield against Emil's wishes. He returns after his uncle beats him when he refuses to go to military school.
- Asia (Sandra Caldwell): The resident housekeeper of Plumfield who handles most of the cooking. She is firm but kind with the students. In return, they respect her advice and admonishments.
- Franz Bhaer (Robin Dunne): Jo and Fritz's nephew. He starts teaching at Plumfield after his uncle's death. Franz is accepted into Harvard, but delays his enrollment until Plumfield can obtain another teacher. In "Tough Crimes", he decides to remain the school's permanent teacher.
- Thomas "Tommy" Bangs (Matt Robinson): A student at Plumfield. Tommy occasionally gets into minor scrapes such as in "Philanthropy".
- Rob Bhaer (Munro Chambers/Thomas Chambers): Jo's young son with her late husband.
- Jack Ford (Dov Tiefenbach)
- Dr. Pierce (Ian D. Clark) is the town doctor of Plumfield.

=== Recurring ===
- Margaret "Meg" Brooke (Jennifer Wigmore): Jo's sister who supports her emotionally after Fritz's death. She mourns the death of her own husband, John, who died some years previously. Meg is also the mother of twins.
- Amy Laurence (Amy Price-Francis: Jo's sister with whom she is sometimes at odds. In "Thanksgiving", Amy returns to America with her husband Laurie and daughter Bess. She sends Bess to Jo's school, though she is opposed to it at first.
- Theodore "Laurie" Laurence (Dan Chameroy): Amy's husband and father of Bess. He worries that Bess has no spirit and sends her to his sister-in-law's school in "Thanksgiving". Laurie is always there to help Jo and her school, including sending a library in "Philanthropy".
- Isaac (Michael Oliphant): An African-American boy who used to be a slave in Georgia with his parents Ruth (Arlene Duncan) and Josiah (Desmond Campbell). Jo helps the family settle in Concord and takes Isaac on as a student.

== Episodes ==
=== Season 1 (1998–99) ===
No. overall	No. in season	Title	Directed by	Written by	Original release date
1	1	"Changes"	Don McBrearty	Carl Binder	November 7, 1998
Jo's husband, Fritz Bhaer, has died, and everyone expects Jo to close the school. When she hires sailor Nick Riley as caretaker for the grounds, things begin to change.
2	2	"Quarantine"	Rob Malenfant	Eric Tuchman	November 14, 1998
A student brings a case of the measles back to Plumfield, so the doctor quarantines the school.
3	3	"Thanksgiving"	Eleanore Lindo	Melissa R. Byer & Treena Hancock	November 21, 1998
Amy reluctantly agrees to send her daughter to Plumfield after Jo enrolls the school's first girl, and Nick plans on returning to the sea.
4	4	"Tough Choices"	Rob Malenfant	Michael Teversham	November 28, 1998
Dan is overjoyed when a friend from Boston shows up at Plumfield, but Nat is none too thrilled.
5	5	"Emancipation"	Graeme Lynch	Mark Evan Schwartz	December 5, 1998
When Nat discovers a poor black family camping within the Plumfield grounds, everyone learns that prejudice can take many forms.
6	6	"The Christmas Angel"	Eleanore Lindo	Melissa R. Byer & Treena Hancock	December 21, 1998
While out looking for the perfect Christmas tree, Nick and the boys come upon a severely injured woman. Everyone pitches in to help her, but also struggle with their first Christmas without Mr. Bhaer and certain loved ones.
7	7	"Philanthropy"	Don McCutcheon	D.A. Nathan	January 2, 1999
Laurie donates a library's-worth of books to Plumfield, which inspires Franz to assign a project on philanthropy and reveals Nick's illiteracy. In the meantime, Jo's beloved horse falls ill, and chances of recovery look grim.
8	8	"Bluffing"	Rob Malenfant	Eric Tuchman	January 16, 1999
Laurie takes a fancy to poker and Nan steals ideas from Nat for their creative writing assignment.
9	9	"Coming Attractions"	Don McCutcheon	Melissa R. Byer & Treena Hancock	January 30, 1999
Meg is taken with an associate of Laurie's while Dan and Bess are at each other's throats as they're paired up for a science project.
10	10	"Blame"	Richard J. Lewis	Carl Binder	February 6, 1999
Jo's carriage breaks down, stranding her in an upcoming storm. Nick goes out in search of her, leaving Franz in charge of the children.
11	11	"The Living Years"	Giles Walker	Eric Tuchman	February 13, 1999
Asia's father arrives in Concord for an unbidden reunion while Nick takes a temporary job at the Mr. Gerson's general store, where he finds some unbidden attention of his own.
12	12	"Father Figure"	Don McCutcheon	Michael Teversham	February 20, 1999
Nat asks Nick to enter a father-son ski tournament with him, so Jo must teach Nick how to ski. Laurie offers to be Dan's father for the day, which gives Nan an interesting idea.
13	13	"Looking Forward"	Rob Malenfant	Barbara Covington	March 6, 1999
Amy commandeers Plumfield for an evening in order to impress a high society lady while Dan goes on a vision-quest to find his identity.

=== Season 2 (1999) ===
No. overall	No. in season	Title	Directed by	Written by	Original release date
14	1	"Civil Disobedience"	Don McCutcheon	Carl Binder	August 27, 1999
The students of Plumfield apply their knowledge of civil disobedience when a slanderous lawsuit threatens to close their school.
15	2	"Stepping Out"	Rob Malenfant	Melissa R. Byer & Treena Hancock	September 3, 1999
When Amy heads the committee for Concord's annual dance, Jo and Nick send each other mixed signals on whether or not they will attend. Meanwhile, thirteen-year-old Bess lies about her age to impress a "college man".
16	3	"Dangerous Lessons"	Rob Malenfant	Barbara Covington	September 10, 1999
Nat takes his violin skills to a new level while Dan joins Nick in tracking an escaped lion. Note: The lion in this episode was really performed by two trained male African lions from the Bowmanville Zoo.
17	4	"Opposites Attract"	Michael Kennedy	Eric Tuchman	September 17, 1999
Franz falls head-over-heels for a boarding-house maid named Isabelle while Amy and Laurie hit a lull in their marriage.
18	5	"Family Business"	Rob Malenfant	Guy Mullally	September 24, 1999
When Asia receives a letter from an aunt in Philadelphia, Meg offers to move to Plumfield in order to help out.
19	6	"Leap of Faith"	Don McCutcheon	Carl Binder	October 1, 1999
Jo becomes reclusive after she's held up at gun-point. Franz becomes distressed when Isabelle receives a letter from her brother.
20	7	"Brothers and Sisters"	Don McBrearty	Eric Tuchman	October 15, 1999
Nick's younger brother, Ben, arrives at Plumfield to hide from a gambling debt. Bess sets her heart on becoming a professional singer, and no one has the heart to tell her that she's tone-deaf.
21	8	"The Lantern Man"	Rob Malenfant	Carl Binder	October 29, 1999
It's Halloween and the ghost stories are flying. Despite her pragmatism, these stories pique the wild side of Jo's imagination when she receives a book offer from a mysterious stranger.
22	9	"The Weaker Sex"	Bruce McDonald	Melissa R. Byer & Treena Hancock	November 5, 1999
Jo joins the women's suffrage movement while Nan tries to prove that she has what it takes to become a doctor.
23	10	"For Love or Money"	Guy Mullally	Don McBrearty	November 12, 1999
A crack in the bathroom door leads to a series of misunderstandings between Jo and Nick. While searching for fossils, Nat and Nan find a large sum of money.
24	11	"Three Angry Women"	Bruce Pitman	Melissa R. Byer & Treena Hancock	November 19, 1999
Meg, Jo, and Amy don't realize how their quarrel is affecting the children.
25	12	"The Sign"	Don McCutcheon	Barbara Covington	December 2, 1999
Jo is feeling the strain of being a teacher, writer, parent, and curator of Plumfield and searches for a sign on what to do about it.
26	13	"Home for Christmas"	Rob Malenfant	Guy Mullallay	December 17, 1999
Nick is accused of murder, and the residents of Plumfield think his brother Ben is behind the crime.

== Production ==
The series was filmed in Pickering, Ontario, at the Claremont Conservation Area. The series was a joint production between Alliance Atlantis Communications and Paxson Communications. Filming of the first season took place between August 1998 and January 1999. The second season was filmed from April through October 1999.

== International distribution ==
While being a Canadian production, Little Men premiered in the United States on PAX TV in November 1998. Showtime Family Zone reran the series in 2003. The show's domestic premiere was January 1, 1999 on CTV. The series was also shown in Switzerland, starting July 31, 2000, where it was known as "L'école du bonheur", in France, starting December 25, 2001, and in India, where it ran on Hallmark Channel.

== Home video releases ==
The series has a total of 26 episodes. Region 1 DVDs of the series distributed by BFS Entertainment in 4 episode installments. BFS has only released the first eight episodes from season one. Episodes 1-4 were also released on VHS by BFS. There is also a Region 4 DVD release from Madmen Entertainment.
