= Coneheads (film) =

1993 film by Steve Barron

- Theatrical release poster
- Directed by: Steve Barron
- Screenplay by: Tom Davis; Dan Aykroyd; Bonnie Turner; Terry Turner
- Based on: Coneheads sketches from Saturday Night Live by Lorne Michaels
- Produced by: Lorne Michaels
- Starring: Dan Aykroyd; Jane Curtin
- Cinematography: Francis Kenny
- Edited by: Paul Trejo
- Music by: David Newman
- Production company: Lorne Michaels Productions
- Distributed by: Paramount Pictures
- Release date: July 23, 1993
- Running time: 87 minutes
- Country: United States
- Language: English
- Budget: $30 million
- Box office: $21 million

Coneheads is a 1993 American science-fiction comedy film released by Paramount Pictures. It was produced by Lorne Michaels, directed by Steve Barron, and starred Dan Aykroyd, Jane Curtin, and Michelle Burke. The film was based on the NBC Saturday Night Live comedy sketches about aliens stranded on Earth, who have Anglicized their Remulakian surname "Clorhone" to "Conehead".

Aykroyd and Curtin reprised their roles, with Burke taking over the role played by Laraine Newman on SNL. The film also features roles and cameos by actors and comedians from SNL and other television series of the time, such as Michael McKean, David Spade, Michael Richards, Sinbad, Adam Sandler, Jan Hooks, Chris Farley, Jason Alexander, Phil Hartman, Drew Carey, Kevin Nealon, Julia Sweeney, Garrett Morris, Laraine Newman, Tim Meadows, Tom Arnold and Jon Lovitz. Released on July 23, 1993, it received mixed-to-negative reviews from critics, and was a commercial failure, taking in $21 million against a $30 million budget.

Three years after the release of Coneheads, screenwriters Bonnie & Terry Turner and star Jane Curtin would revisit the premise of aliens arriving on Earth and assimilating into American society with the TV show 3rd Rock from the Sun, with Curtin instead playing a human character.

Coneheads has often been recognized as an allegorical commentary on the illegal-immigrant experience in America. The movie's storyline traces the experiences of Beldar and Prymaat, and later their native-born daughter Connie, from their humble beginnings to the point where they successfully integrate into American society.

== Plot ==
Upon discovering a UFO in American airspace, the National Guard sends fighter jets to investigate, which fire on the unresponsive craft and cause it to crash into the Atlantic Ocean, near Manhattan. The aliens from the planet Remulak, Beldar and his wife Prymaat, survive aboard the ship. Assigned by the highmaster, Beldar was to conquer the earth for planet Remulak. Beldar becomes an appliance repairman, and upon discovering his undocumented status, his boss Otto gets him a false identity from local gangsters, which quickly alerts the INS. Ambitious INS agent Gorman Seedling and his sycophantic assistant Eli Turnbull unsuccessfully attempt to capture the couple. Prymaat informs Beldar she is pregnant. The Coneheads are told that a rescue ship will not be arriving for many years, so they attempt to blend in with human society, despite their odd appearance and metallic voices. Beldar and Prymaat save a lot of money by moving to the suburbs.

After their daughter Connie's birth, they adopt the surname Conehead, buy a home, and move to suburban Paramus, New Jersey, where Beldar opens a driving school. Meanwhile, Gorman terminates his pursuit of the Coneheads after getting a promotion, but a U.S. Senate inquiry, citing the heavy expense, demands that the case be properly concluded.

The now-teenaged Connie, who has grown up among Earth's norms and culture, wants to fit in with her peers, though her father greatly objects, especially when she begins seeing auto mechanic Ronnie Guestsetter. Gorman and Eli track the Coneheads to their home, posing as Jehovah's Witnesses to gain entry. During the conversation, Prymaat discovers their communication device to Remulak is beeping and notifies Beldar that 'the Big Phone' has contacted him, causing him to eject the two promptly. He is then notified of their approaching rescue vessel.

After Connie is told of their imminent rescue, she informs her parents she wants to stay on Earth with Ronnie. The INS arrives to arrest the Coneheads. Ronnie helps stall the agents while the rescue vessel arrives just in time, and Gorman and Eli are taken aboard with the Coneheads. On Remulak, Beldar is welcomed home, presenting the Highmaster with various earthly 'gifts', including Gorman and Eli as slaves. Initially satisfied with Beldar's accomplishments, the Highmaster notices that Beldar's sharp teeth have been capped (something Otto had advised Beldar to do to blend in), accuses him of treason and sentences him to fight the ferocious Garthok, greatly distressing Prymaat.

After the Garthok easily and gruesomely kills other condemned criminals, Beldar uses his earthly golfing skills to hit a rock into the Garthok's mouth, causing it to choke. The Highmaster pardons Beldar and honors Beldar's request to return to Earth and have Gorman as his slave. Eli stays behind and becomes the Highmaster's new flunky. Departing for Earth with Prymaat, Connie and Gorman in tow, Beldar soon prioritizes Connie's feelings over planetary conquest by faking an Earth attack, ordering his invasion force to retreat and proceed to their secondary target in another part of the galaxy, while making it look like a superior weapon has destroyed his spaceship. As a reward for rescuing him, Gorman agrees to give the Coneheads green cards. The Conehead family settles down to a happy life on their adopted planet while Connie and Ronnie go to the High School senior prom together.

== Cast ==
- Dan Aykroyd as Beldar Clorhone (later Conehead) / Donald R. DeCicco
- Jane Curtin as Prymaat Clorhone (later Conehead) / Mary Margaret Rowney
- Michelle Burke as Conjaab "Connie" Clorhone/Conehead
  - Danielle Aykroyd as 3-year-old Connie Conehead
  - Nicolette Harnish as 10-year-old Connie Conehead
- Michael McKean as INS Deputy Commissioner Gorman Seedling
- Laraine Newman as Laarta Zaanthstrom
- Jason Alexander as Larry Farber
- Lisa Jane Persky as Lisa Farber
- Chris Farley as Ronnie Guestsetter
- David Spade as INS Agent Eli Turnbull
- Sinbad as Otto
- Phil Hartman as Marlax Zanthstrom
- Jan Hooks as Gladys Johnson
- Dave Thomas as Highmaster
- Jonathan Penner as Air Traffic Captain
- Whip Hubley as F-16 Pilot
- Michael Richards as Clerk
- Eddie Griffin as Customer
- Adam Sandler as Carmine
- Drew Carey as Passenger
- Shishir Kurup as Khoudri
- Barry Kivel as Doctor
- Terry Turner as Sketch Artist
- Joey Lauren Adams as Christina
- Parker Posey as Stephanie
- Kevin Nealon as Senator
- Julia Sweeney as Principal
- Ellen DeGeneres as Coach
- Todd Susman as Ron
- James Keane as Harv
- Sam Freed as MC
- Garrett Morris as Captain Orecruiser
- Tom Davis as Supplicant
- Peter Aykroyd as Mentot
- Tim Meadows as Laktar
- Mitchell Bobrow as Combatant
- Jon Lovitz as Dr. Rudolph (uncredited)
- Tom Arnold as Tommy (uncredited)

== Production ==
Tom Davis, who created the Coneheads characters on Saturday Night Live, wrote the first version of the screenplay. He was unhappy with choices made by the producers, including setting the Remulak scenes in a gladiators' arena, rather than the suburban environment that he envisioned. While there are some differences, Coneheads mostly follows the same plot as in the 1983 animated special that was created ten years earlier. Similarities include the Coneheads being stranded on Earth, Beldar Conehead (Dan Aykroyd) working as an appliance repair man and Connie Conehead dating an earthling named Ronnie. The film mostly takes place in Paramus, New Jersey. Some scenes were filmed in New York City and the New Jersey towns of Jersey City and Wrightstown.

In addition to Jane Curtin appearing as a regular cast member, Jan Hooks, Phil Hartman, Julia Sweeney, Kevin Nealon and Laraine Newman all appeared as guest stars on 3rd Rock from the Sun, which was created by Coneheads co-writers Bonnie and Terry Turner and featured a similar premise of aliens making efforts to assimilate into American society. Additionally, co-writer Terry Turner cameos in the film as the sketch artist that Gorman Seedling (Michael McKean) describes Beldar to. Michelle Burke, Parker Posey and Joey Lauren Adams would all appear in Dazed and Confused, which was released 2 months after Coneheads.

== Reception ==
The film debuted at No. 6 on its opening weekend. Coneheads' domestic box office grossed $7,100,501. By the end of its domestic (U.S. and Canada) theatrical run, the film had grossed $21,074,717.

Coneheads received mixed-to-negative reviews from critics. The review aggregator website Rotten Tomatoes gives the film a low score of 39%, based on 31 reviews with a consensus that reads, "Listless, crude, and overall uninspired, Coneheads offers further evidence that stretching an SNL sketch to feature length can be tougher than Narfling a Garthok." Metacritic, which uses a weighted average, assigned the film a score of 49 out of 100, based on 20 critics, indicating "mixed or average" reviews. Audiences surveyed by CinemaScore gave the film a grade of "B+" on scale of A+ to F.

Roger Ebert gave the film 1 1/2 stars out of 4, describing Coneheads as "dismal, dreary and fairly desperate" and the actors as unable to overcome an uninspired screenplay. Janet Maslin of The New York Times said the film "has its dopey charms", and that it is suitable for people who found Wayne's World too demanding. The Los Angeles Times called it "an unusually companionable jape; in this world it makes perfect sense that the Coneheads' friends and neighbors never really register that there's anything terribly different about them. They're all-American eccentrics—even if they happen to come from the planet Remulak".

Coneheads received some critical re-evaluation during the 2010s, with multiple writers noting its satirical take on an illegal-immigrant family experience and immigration enforcement (meant as an exaggeration of Ronald Reagan-era politics) became eerily politically relevant following the September 11 attacks.

== Soundtrack ==
Coneheads: Music from the Motion Picture Soundtrack

Soundtrack album by Various Artists
- Released: July 20, 1993
- Recorded: 1992–1993
- Genre: Soundtrack
- Length: 43:27
- Label: Warner Bros. Records
- Producer: Various Artists

Singles from Coneheads: Music from the Motion Picture Soundtrack
- 1. "Soul to Squeeze" Released: August 19, 1993

Professional ratings
Review scores
Source	Rating
AllMusic	link
Music Week	3/5 stars

The soundtrack for Coneheads was released on July 20, 1993, by Warner Bros. Records. It features the songs "Tainted Love" by Soft Cell, "It's a Free World, Baby" by R.E.M. and "Soul to Squeeze" by the Red Hot Chili Peppers which would go on to reach #22 on the US Billboard Hot 100. The album itself would peak at #162 on the US Billboard 200 chart. The original track "Conehead Love" performed by Aykroyd and Curtain with Nan Schaefer featured an original music video starring cast members from the movie.

=== Track listing ===
No.	Title	Performed by	Length
1.	"Magic Carpet Ride"	Michael Monroe and Slash	3:40
2.	"Tainted Love"	Soft Cell	2:42
3.	"No More Tears (Enough Is Enough)"	Andy Bell and k.d. lang	3:51
4.	"Kodachrome"	Paul Simon	3:30
5.	"Can't Take My Eyes Off You"	Morten Harket	3:43
6.	"It's a Free World, Baby"	R.E.M.	5:12
7.	"Soul to Squeeze"	Red Hot Chili Peppers	4:52
8.	"Fight the Power"	Barenaked Ladies	4:05
9.	"Little Renee"	Digable Planets	3:22
10.	"Chale Jao"	Babble	4:10
11.	"Conehead Love"	Dan Aykroyd and Jane Curtin with Nan Schaefer	4:05
Total length:			43:27

None of David Newman's score was included on the above album, but it was issued on a 2015 Intrada album paired with his scores for Talent for the Game and Itsy Bitsy Spider.
