= Nicole Hansen =

American actress

- Born: December 18, 1965 (age 60)
- Occupations: Producer, actress, clean technology liaison
- Years active: 1989–present

Nicole Hansen is an American producer, actress, and president of eBrandgelize Digital. She has contributed to Indiewire's Box Office Insider and the Producers Guild of America's Produced by magazine. Her work has been profiled in Ms. In the Biz and My Devotional Thoughts. For her own films, she worked with film festival publicists and produced her then-10-year-old son's public service announcement Save It and also served as a technology liaison to the entertainment industry.

As an actress, she is best known for her role of Mary in American Cyborg: Steel Warrior. She also played Marilyn Monroe in Billy Idol music videos "L.A. Woman" and "Cradle of Love," directed by David Fincher. In 2018, she returned to acting with a part on Chesapeake Shores.

== Filmography ==
=== As producer ===
Year	Title	Role
2015	The Burden	Executive Producer
2015	BattleKasters (video game)	Executive Producer
2013	King of the Nerds	Associate Producer
2008	Save It (short)	Producer
2008	Forgotten Voices: Women in Bosnia (documentary)	Associate Producer
2003	Ash Tuesday	Co-Producer
2002	Driving to Ground Zero (documentary)	Associate Producer
1997	Tinseltown	Co-Producer

=== As web publicist ===
Year	Title
2016-2018	Chesapeake Shores
2018	Brand New Old Love
2018	Darrow & Darrow 2
2015-2018	When Calls the Heart
2018	Royal Matchmaker
2018	Royal Hearts
2017	Christmas Inheritance
2017	Christmas Encore
2017	A Christmas Prince
2017	Christmas in Angel Falls
2017	Darrow & Darrow
2017	All Saints
2017	Pray for Rain
2017	Murder, She Baked: Just Desserts
2017	Campfire Kiss
2017	A Royal Winter
2017	Love on Ice
2016	I'll Be Home for Christmas
2016	Every Christmas Has a Story
2016	A Wish For Christmas
2016	In Dubious Battle
2016	For Love & Honor
2016	Flower Shop Mystery: Dearly Depotted
2016	The Wedding March
2016	Good Witch
2016	Flower Shop Mystery: Snipped in the Bud
2016	Flower Shop Mystery: Mum's the Word
2016	Murder, She Baked: A Peach Cobbler Mystery
2015	Mariah Carey's Merriest Christmas
2015	A Christmas Melody
2015	A Christmas Detour
2015	Crown for Christmas
2015	Murder, She Baked: A Plum Pudding Mystery

=== As actor ===
Year	Title	Role
2018	Chesapeake Shores	Jacqui Kaese
2007	Afterworld	Janelle Shoemaker
2004	Noise	Sheila
2003	Ash Tuesday	Judy
1997	Tinseltown	Eugenia
1997	Soldier Boyz (video game)	Gabrielle Prescott
1996	Exit (video)	Nikki
1995	Soldier Boyz	Gabrielle Prescott
1995	Cover Me	Amy Thomas
1993	American Cyborg: Steel Warrior	Mary
1993	Doppelganger	Crazy Woman In Cafe Victor (uncredited)
1991	The Marrying Man	Tidbit Girl (uncredited)
1990	The Sleeping Car	Clarice
1990	Strangers	Elizabeth
1989	The Preppie Murder	Chambermaid #2
