= The Last Word (1995 film) =

- Directed by: Tony Spiridakis
- Written by: Tony Spiridakis
- Produced by: Tony Spiridakis; Randy Lippert
- Starring: Timothy Hutton; Joe Pantoliano; Michelle Burke; Chazz Palminteri; Tony Goldwyn
- Cinematography: Zoltan David
- Edited by: Andy Blumenthal
- Music by: Paul Buckmaster
- Production companies: Chance the Moon Inc. Arama Entertainment
- Release date: August 27, 1995
- Running time: 90 minutes
- Country: United States
- Language: English

The Last Word (also titled Cosa Nostra: The Last Word) is a 1995 American crime film written and directed by Tony Spiridakis, and starring Timothy Hutton, Joe Pantoliano, Michelle Burke, Chazz Palminteri, and Tony Goldwyn. Avi Lerner served as the film's executive producer.

== Synopsis ==
Martin Ryan is a Detroit columnist with mob ties. He meets Caprice, a stripper with a dark past. When his best friend Doc helps sell a film deal based on his writings to a Hollywood studio, Martin chooses between fame or saving his girlfriend Sara.

== Cast ==
- Timothy Hutton as Martin Ryan
- Joe Pantoliano as Doc
- Michelle Burke as Sara
- Chazz Palminteri as Ricky
- Tony Goldwyn as Stan
- Richard Dreyfuss as Larry
- Cybill Shepherd as Kiki Taylor
- Roma Downey as Roxy
- Joe Cortese as Jimmy

== Production ==
The film was shot in Detroit and Los Angeles.

== Release ==
The film premiered on Showtime on August 27, 1995.

== Reception ==
John Ferguson of Radio Times awarded the film two stars out of five.

Alan Rich of Variety gave the film a negative review and wrote, "For all the surface glitz, there isn’t much in the prevailing deadpan performances — which include cameos by Shepherd and the ubiquitous Richard Dreyfuss — to make anyone care."
