= Media Life Magazine =

Defunct American online magazine

- Categories: Mass media
- First issue: May 1999
- Final issue: March 2017
- Country: United States
- Language: English
- Website: medialifemagazine.com
- ISSN: 0024-3019

Media Life Magazine was an online publication that was started in May 1999 by Gene Ely. The publication covered all aspects of the media. The magazine ceased publication in late March 2017.
