= Michelle Burke =

American actress (born 1970)

- Occupation: Actress
- Years active: 1991–2020

Michelle Burke is an American former actress. She gained recognition in the early 1990s for film roles such as Jodi Kramer in Dazed and Confused and Connie Conehead in Coneheads (both 1993), alongside an appearance in the 1994 Major League sequel, Major League II.

== Filmography ==
Film and television
Year	Title	Role	Notes
1993	Parker Lewis Can't Lose	Stacy	Episode: "The Bitch Is Back"
1993	Coneheads	Connie Conehead	
1993	Dazed and Confused	Jodi Kramer	
1994	Major League II	Nikki Reese	
1994	Tales from the Crypt	Jane	Episode: "Operation Friendship"
1995	The Last Word	Sara	
1995	Diagnosis: Murder	Tara Sampson	Episode: "My Baby Is Out of This World"
1995	Midnight in Saint Petersburg	Brandy	
1996	Sliders	Melinda	Episode: "Dragonslide"
1997	The Notorious 7	Sarah Valentine	TV movie
1997	Caged Hearts	Ranch Inmate	
1997	The Last Don	Claudia De Lena	TV miniseries
1998	Scattering Dad	Taylor	TV movie
1998	The Last Don II	Claudia De Lena	TV miniseries
1998	Telling You	Kristen's Friend	
1998–1999	Little Men	Josephine 'Jo' Bhaer	24 episodes
2001	Diagnosis: Murder	Claire Sheldrake	Episode: "Less Than Zero"
2001	Mysterious Ways	Jena Owens	Episode: "Dead Dog Walking"
2002	The Division	Melissa Llewellyn	Episode: "Hide and Seek"
2011	Criminal Minds: Suspect Behavior	Carol Langstrom	Episode: "One Shot Kill"
2012	LOL	Lauren	
2012	Ben and Becca	Sarah	Short film
2017	A Second Chance	Betsy	
2018	The Final Wish	Mrs. McKee	
2020	Captors	Dr. Karen Nera	a.k.a. Alone
