= Recurring Saturday Night Live characters and sketches introduced 1985–86 =

The following is a list of recurring Saturday Night Live characters and sketches introduced between November 9, 1985, and May 24, 1986, the eleventh season of SNL.

== Cabrini Green Jackson ==
A Danitra Vance sketch. Debuted November 9, 1985.

Appearances

Season	Episode	Host	Notes
11	November 9, 1985	Madonna	
11	November 23, 1985	Pee-wee Herman	
11	December 21, 1985	Teri Garr	
11	January 25, 1986	Dudley Moore	
11	April 12, 1986	Oprah Winfrey	
11	May 17, 1986	Jimmy Breslin	

== The Jones Brothers ==
A Damon Wayans and Anthony Michael Hall sketch. Debuted November 9, 1985.

== The Limits of the Imagination ==
The Limits of the Imagination was a short-lived sketch featured on the 1985–1986 season. It featured Randy Quaid as "The Floating Head", a Rod Serling-like character who would introduce a creepy, Twilight Zone-esque story with a weak ending (or no ending at all). The title was also reminiscent of the 1960s sci-fi anthology The Outer Limits.

Appearances

Season	Episode	Host	Notes
11	November 9, 1985	Madonna	In a loose parody of The Twilight Zone episode "The Hitch-hiker", Madonna plays a female motorist who is being followed by a crazy man (played by Jon Lovitz) living in the engine of her car.
11	December 7, 1985	John Lithgow	Joan Cusack, Robert Downey Jr., Nora Dunn, and Terry Sweeney play restaurant patrons who are trapped at an "all-you-can-eat" fish restaurant where patrons are forced to eat everything on the menu.
11	January 25, 1986	Dudley Moore	Dudley Moore plays a bad comedian who sells his soul to the devil (played by Jon Lovitz) in order to be popular.
11	February 8, 1986	Ron Reagan	In a parody of several Twilight Zone episodes, notably "Person or Persons Unknown", Ron Reagan Jr. plays a man who is treated like a stranger by his wife (Joan Cusack), son (Robert Downey Jr.), and friends (Jon Lovitz, Damon Wayans, and Dan Vitale).
11	February 15, 1986	Jerry Hall	Jerry Hall plays "Maggie the Cat" from Cat on a Hot Tin Roof, who traps and seduces a gay man (played by Terry Sweeney) in her hotel room.
11	May 10, 1986	Catherine Oxenberg, Paul Simon	Young Paul Simon and Art Garfunkel (played by Robert Downey Jr. and Anthony Michael Hall) sell their souls to the Devil (Jon Lovitz) for success. Later, an elderly Paul Simon (who appears as himself) lives out his personal hell of listening to Muzak versions of his greatest hits while stuck in an elevator.

== The Pat Stevens Show ==
Nora Dunn played the host, a somewhat dim, shallow, ex-model who thought Vogue was literature. Debuted November 16, 1985.

Appearances

Season	Episode	Host	Notes
11	November 16, 1985	Chevy Chase	
11	November 23, 1985	Pee-wee Herman	
11	December 14, 1985	Tom Hanks	
11	January 25, 1986	Dudley Moore	
11	February 8, 1986	Ron Reagan	
11	February 15, 1986	Jerry Hall	
11	April 12, 1986	Oprah Winfrey	
11	May 17, 1986	Jimmy Breslin	
12	December 6, 1986	Chevy Chase, Steve Martin, Martin Short	
12	January 31, 1987	Paul Shaffer	
12	April 11, 1987	John Lithgow	
13	October 31, 1987	Dabney Coleman	
13	February 20, 1988	Tom Hanks	
14	October 8, 1988	Tom Hanks	
14	November 19, 1988	John Lithgow	
14	February 18, 1989	Leslie Nielsen	
15	February 24, 1990	Fred Savage	

== Craig Sundberg, Idiot Savant ==
An Anthony Michael Hall sketch. Craig Sundberg is a particularly blockheaded teenager who gets summoned to help with complex scientific problems; though seemingly completely stupid, Craig somehow consistently saves the day. Debuted November 16, 1985.

== Tommy Flanagan, the Pathological Liar ==
The Pathological Liar is a character created and portrayed by Jon Lovitz, pre-dating his work on SNL. (The character's first TV appearance was on The Tonight Show Starring Johnny Carson in March, 1985.) The Liar often appeared on Weekend Update segments to share his farcical views, but was also used in full-length sketches and show openings. The character's name was Tommy Flanagan (/fləˈneɪɡən/ flə-NAY-gən) — not to be confused with the jazz pianist) — and he would tell outrageous whoppers in an effort to make himself seem important (such as his claim that he invented rock and roll). One recurring lie was claiming he was married to Morgan Fairchild, and thus had seen her naked, "more than once." His devious look, hand rubbing and nervous speech made it clear he was making up lies, one after the other, on the spot. After a particularly outrageous lie he would often use an old Humphrey Bogart line, "Yeah! That's the ticket!", as a catchphrase.

One of his biggest lies, however, would work to his great advantage. During the cold opening when Jerry Hall hosted, Flanagan claimed to be an old friend of her then-boyfriend Mick Jagger; when Jagger entered moments later, he shocked her by revealing that the two were longtime friends, and had actually spent the previous weekend together, while she had no idea of his whereabouts, on a fishing trip. As he and Hall got up to leave, Jagger told Flanagan, "I owe you for this one," before opening the show.

Appearances

Season	Episode	Host	Notes
11	November 16, 1985	Chevy Chase	
11	November 23, 1985	Pee-wee Herman	
11	December 14, 1985	Tom Hanks	
11	January 25, 1986	Dudley Moore	
11	February 15, 1986	Jerry Hall	
11	February 22, 1986	Jay Leno	
11	March 15, 1986	Griffin Dunne	
11	March 22, 1986	George Wendt, Francis Ford Coppola	
11	April 12, 1986	Oprah Winfrey	
11	May 10, 1986	Catherine Oxenberg, Paul Simon	
11	May 17, 1986	Jimmy Breslin	
12	October 11, 1986	Sigourney Weaver	
12	November 8, 1986	Rosanna Arquette	
12	December 6, 1986	Chevy Chase, Steve Martin, Martin Short	
12	January 24, 1987	Joe Montana, Walter Payton	
12	February 21, 1987	Willie Nelson	
12	May 23, 1987	Dennis Hopper	
14	April 1, 1989	Mel Gibson	
23	November 8, 1997	Jon Lovitz	

== Master Thespian ==
Jon Lovitz plays a ruthlessly ambitious, egomaniacal actor who spoke with a plummy "Shakespearean" English accent and often elicited the sympathy of other characters in the sketch, only to reveal the ruse by declaring his catchphrase, "Acting!" His arch-rival and mentor, Baudelaire (John Lithgow), often had the last laugh in the escalating one-upmanship, in reality childish pranks and paperthin disguises that they both fell for, ostensibly due to their brilliant acting. On the few occasions we actually see him act, it is clear that he is not as good as his reputation would have us believe, on occasion seeming completely oblivious to the concept of acting. The sketch debuted December 7, 1985 and appeared 13 times between 1985 and 1989.

In 2016, Lovitz stated that the character was based on Canadian actor William Needles The character was meant as a tribute, not a put-down: "He was the kindest, nicest man. A great actor," Lovitz tweeted. "I based (the) character Master Thespian a lot on him. He was the nicest teacher, ever."

Appearances

Season	Episode	Host	Notes
11	December 7, 1985	John Lithgow	
11	January 25, 1986	Dudley Moore	
11	February 15, 1986	Jerry Hall	
11	March 22, 1986	George Wendt, Francis Ford Coppola	
11	April 19, 1986	Tony Danza	
12	November 22, 1986	Robin Williams	
12	April 11, 1987	John Lithgow	
13	December 19, 1987	Paul Simon	
13	January 23, 1988	Carl Weathers	
14	November 19, 1988	John Lithgow	
14	December 10, 1988	Kevin Kline	
14	February 25, 1989	Glenn Close	

== The Rudy Randolphs ==
A Randy Quaid and Robert Downey Jr. sketch. Debuted December 7, 1985.

Appearances

Season	Episode	Host	Notes
11	December 7, 1985	John Lithgow	
11	January 18, 1986	Harry Dean Stanton	
11	March 15, 1986	Griffin Dunne	

== The Stand-Ups ==
An ensemble sketch; Jon Lovitz appeared in all three "Stand-Ups" sketches, while Tom Hanks, Damon Wayans and Dennis Miller each appeared in two of the three. Several stand-up comedians talk backstage, drinking coffee before their set. Their patter is always delivered in an exaggerated stand-up style: "Hey! What's with half-and-half? If it's half-empty, is it quarter-quarter? I wanna know!" Debuted December 14, 1985.

Appearances

Season	Episode	Host	Notes
11	December 14, 1985	Tom Hanks	Three stand-ups: Tom Hanks (as Paul), Jon Lovitz (as Bob), Damon Wayans (as Keith)
11	February 22, 1986	Jay Leno	Four stand-ups: Jon Lovitz (as Bob), Dennis Miller (character unnamed), Damon Wayans (as Keith) and Jay Leno (as Jackie Niles)
13	February 20, 1988	Tom Hanks	Four stand-ups: Tom Hanks (as Bill), Jon Lovitz (as Bob), Dennis Miller (as Steve), and Dana Carvey (as Jeff).

Tom Hanks reprised his Paul character from this sketch in a Cut For Time "Bruce Chandling" Weekend Update feature on October 22, 2016 (Season 42, Episode 4).

== That Black Girl ==
A Danitra Vance sketch. Debuted January 18, 1986.

== Vinnie Barber ==
A Jon Lovitz sketch. Debuted January 18, 1986.

== Mephistopheles ==
A Jon Lovitz sketch. Debuted January 25, 1986.

Appearances

Season	Episode	Host	Notes
11	January 25, 1986	Dudley Moore	Debuted as part of a recurring Limits of the Imagination sketch
11	May 10, 1986	Catherine Oxenberg, Paul Simon	
11	May 24, 1986	Anjelica Huston, Billy Martin	
12	November 8, 1986	Rosanna Arquette	
12	December 6, 1986	Chevy Chase, Steve Martin, Martin Short	
12	February 21, 1987	Willie Nelson	
14	December 17, 1988	Melanie Griffith	
14	February 18, 1989	Leslie Nielsen	
15	March 24, 1990	Debra Winger	
15	May 12, 1990	Andrew Dice Clay	

== The Big Picture ==
A Weekend Update commentary segment, with A. Whitney Brown explaining how several seemingly-unrelated current news events fit into "The Big Picture". The segment was created by Brown and Mark McKinney.

Appearances

Season	Episode	Host	Notes
11	February 8, 1986	Ron Reagan	
11	February 22, 1986	Jay Leno	
11	March 15, 1986	Griffin Dunne	
11	April 12, 1986	Oprah Winfrey	
11	May 10, 1986	Catherine Oxenberg, Paul Simon	
11	May 24, 1986	Anjelica Huston, Billy Martin	
12	October 11, 1986	Sigourney Weaver	
12	November 8, 1986	Rosanna Arquette	
12	November 22, 1986	Robin Williams	
12	January 24, 1987	Joe Montana, Walter Payton	
12	February 14, 1987	Bronson Pinchot	
12	February 21, 1987	Willie Nelson	
12	April 11, 1987	John Lithgow	
12	May 9, 1987	Mark Harmon	
12	May 23, 1987	Dennis Hopper	
13	November 14, 1987	Robert Mitchum	
13	December 12, 1987	Angie Dickinson	
13	January 30, 1988	Carl Weathers	
13	February 27, 1988	Judge Reinhold	
14	October 15, 1988	Matthew Broderick	
14	November 5, 1988	Matthew Modine	
14	December 10, 1988	Kevin Kline	
14	January 21, 1989	John Malkovich	
14	February 25, 1989	Glenn Close	
14	May 20, 1989	Steve Martin	
15	September 30, 1989	Bruce Willis	
15	October 21, 1989	Kathleen Turner	
15	October 28, 1989	James Woods	
15	March 17, 1990	Rob Lowe	
15	April 21, 1990	Alec Baldwin	
15	May 19, 1990	Candice Bergen	
16	October 27, 1990	Patrick Swayze	
16	January 12, 1991	Joe Mantegna	
16	February 9, 1991	Kevin Bacon	
16	March 16, 1991	Michael J. Fox	

== Babette ==
A Nora Dunn sketch, as she plays French sex kitten and international jet-setter Babette (“A sex kitten never dies; we just get fluffy”). Debuted February 15, 1986.

Appearances

Season	Episode	Host	Notes
11	February 15, 1986	Jerry Hall	Weekend Update
11	April 19, 1986	Tony Danza	Weekend Update
12	December 13, 1986	Steve Guttenberg	Weekend Update
12	February 14, 1987	Bronson Pinchot	
12	April 18, 1987	John Larroquette	Weekend Update
12	May 16, 1987	Garry Shandling	Teeny Café
13	October 24, 1987	Sean Penn	Teeny Café

== The Further Adventures of Biff and Salena ==
The various mundane events in the lives of a seemingly mentally disabled couple (Jon Lovitz and Joan Cusack). Debuted February 22, 1986.

== Actors of Film ==
A Nora Dunn and Robert Downey Jr. sketch. Jimmy Chance (Robert Downey Jr.) and Ashley Ashley (Nora Dunn) gushingly and pretentiously discuss films and filmmaking. Debuted March 22, 1986.

Appearances

Season	Episode	Host	Notes
11	March 22, 1986	George Wendt, Francis Ford Coppola	
11	April 12, 1986	Oprah Winfrey	
11	May 24, 1986	Anjelica Huston, Billy Martin	

Preceded by Recurring Saturday Night Live characters and sketches introduced 1984-85	Recurring Saturday Night Live characters and sketches (listed chronologically)	Succeeded by Recurring Saturday Night Live characters and sketches introduced 1986-87
