= Recurring Saturday Night Live characters and sketches introduced 1987–88 =

The following is a list of recurring Saturday Night Live characters and sketches introduced between October 17, 1987, and February 27, 1988, the thirteenth season of SNL.

== Pumping Up with Hans and Franz ==
Dana Carvey and Kevin Nealon play two Austrian jocks, inspired by Arnold Schwarzenegger. Debuted October 17, 1987.

Appearances

Season	Episode	Host	Notes
13	October 17, 1987	Steve Martin	
13	November 21, 1987	Candice Bergen	
13	December 19, 1987	Paul Simon	
13	January 23, 1988	Robin Williams	
13	February 27, 1988	Judge Reinhold	
14	October 8, 1988	Tom Hanks	
14	November 12, 1988	Demi Moore	
14	December 3, 1988	Danny DeVito	
14	February 25, 1989	Glenn Close	
14	May 20, 1989	Steve Martin	
15	October 7, 1989	Rick Moranis	
15	November 18, 1989	Woody Harrelson	
15	February 10, 1990	Quincy Jones	
16	October 27, 1990	Patrick Swayze	
16	March 23, 1991	Jeremy Irons	
16	April 20, 1991	Steven Seagal	
17	October 26, 1991	Christian Slater	
18	October 31, 1992	Catherine O'Hara	
20	October 22, 1994	Dana Carvey	Weekend Update
25	October 16, 1999	Heather Graham	Where Are They Now?

== Dennis Miller ==
Dana Carvey impersonates the Weekend Update anchor beside him, giving an opposing viewpoint on news items.

Appearances

Season	Episode	Host	Notes
13	December 19, 1987	Paul Simon	
14	October 22, 1988	John Larroquette	
14	December 17, 1988	Melanie Griffith	
15	October 28, 1989	James Woods	
16	December 8, 1990	Tom Hanks	with a third Dennis Miller (Hanks)
17	May 16, 1992	Woody Harrelson	during Johnny Carson final show spoof cold open (solo, not with Dennis Miller)

== Tonto, Tarzan and Frankenstein's Monster ==
This trio showcased three popular film characters who were probably least likely to get together and sing because they are all known for their inability to speak proper English. Tonto (played by Jon Lovitz) and Tarzan (played by Kevin Nealon) mostly spoke the lyrics in broken English, leaving out certain verbs and pronouns, while Frankenstein's Monster (played by Phil Hartman) usually just growled and moaned, rarely forming any semblance of the actual words, though he could opine that "bread good" and "fire bad". They came together to sing "We Are the World", and during the holidays they would usually sing Christmas carols. On one occasion, they recited Edgar Allan Poe's classic poem "The Raven". For Easter, the trio were joined by Frankenstein's Monster's evil twin (Mel Gibson), who spoke whole sentences; they sang "Here Comes Peter Cottontail". All four, plus Tarzan's own Jane, starred in their own sporadic soap opera, "As World Turn" (taken from the long-running As the World Turns). Debuted December 19, 1987 and appeared in the early 1990s.

Appearances

Season	Episode	Host	Notes
13	December 19, 1987	Paul Simon	
14	December 17, 1988	Melanie Griffith	
14	January 28, 1989	Tony Danza	
14	April 1, 1989	Mel Gibson	
14	May 20, 1989	Steve Martin	
15	October 28, 1989	James Woods	
15	November 18, 1989	Woody Harrelson	
15	December 16, 1989	Andie MacDowell	
15	February 10, 1990	Quincy Jones	
17	December 14, 1991	Steve Martin	with Chris Farley replacing Tonto

Appearances

Tarzan:

- November 19, 1988

Frankenstein's Monster:

- January 19, 1991
- April 17, 1993
- March 23, 1996

== Learning To Feel ==
A Nora Dunn sketch. Debuted January 23, 1988.

Appearances

Season	Episode	Host	Notes
13	January 23, 1988	Robin Williams	
13	February 13, 1988	Justine Bateman	
14	October 15, 1988	Matthew Broderick	

== Girl Watchers ==
A Tom Hanks and Jon Lovitz sketch. Two men comment to each other as they leer at passing women. Their cocksure tone of voice never changes, even as they acknowledge that no woman would ever find them attractive. Debuted February 20, 1988.

Appearances

Season	Episode	Host	Notes
13	February 20, 1988	Tom Hanks	
14	October 8, 1988	Tom Hanks	
15	February 17, 1990	Tom Hanks	

Preceded by Recurring Saturday Night Live characters and sketches introduced 1986-87	Recurring Saturday Night Live characters and sketches (listed chronologically)	Succeeded by Recurring Saturday Night Live characters and sketches introduced 1988-89
