= Recurring Saturday Night Live characters and sketches introduced 1986–87 =

The following is a list of recurring Saturday Night Live characters and sketches introduced between October 11, 1986, and May 23, 1987, the twelfth season of SNL.

== Lane Maxwell ==
A Dana Carvey character. Debuted October 11, 1986. Also known as Lane Maxwell, professional psychic.

=== Character ===
As described by his title, Lane is a psychic. He is featured in several different occasions for different reasons. He always wears a blue suit with black buttons and thick black framed glasses. He is rather sympathetic and is normally in a happy mood due to the fact that he is always as he describes it "two and one quarter steps ahead of everybody". He is the author of the fictitious autobiography I Knew You Were Gonna Buy This Book which is mentioned in all the sketches featuring him.

=== Appearances ===
Lane's first appearance was in a fictitious game show called "Quiz Masters" where he was in a question and answer game against a lady worker from the cracker jacks cookie company. When the game started he won by several points until he started predicting a "meteor" rather than the answers and his opponent starts winning, eventually a meteor falls on his opponent and kills her, making him the winner. He was later featured as a guest in the fictitious The Arsenio Hall Show parody The Carsenio Hall Show where an interview was made to him (this was the first crossover between recurring sketches in SNL history). He then received his very own talk show, which strangely ended when the creator of the show was accidentally killed by a falling skunk juggling shurikens on a spotlight, leading the show to be cancelled.

=== Catchphrases ===
- I knew you were gonna say that!
- I'm always two and one quarter steps ahead of everybody.

== Marge Keister ==
A Jan Hooks character. Debuted October 11, 1986.

Appearances

Season	Episode	Host	Notes
12	October 11, 1986	Sigourney Weaver	
12	November 15, 1986	Sam Kinison	
12	December 13, 1986	Steve Guttenberg	
12	February 14, 1987	Bronson Pinchot	
12	May 16, 1987	Garry Shandling	
13	October 24, 1987	Sean Penn	
14	November 19, 1988	John Lithgow	

== The Church Lady ==
Dana Carvey plays a "holier-than-thou" talk show host. Debuted October 11, 1986.

=== Church Chat ===
Season	Episode	Host	Notes
12	October 11, 1986	Sigourney Weaver	Christopher Durang (Himself), Sally Kellerman (Jan Hooks), Ann Landers (Nora Dunn) and Zuul (Sigourney Weaver)
12	November 8, 1986	Rosanna Arquette	Jenny Baker (Victoria Jackson), Rosanna Arquette (Herself) and Ric Ocasek (Himself)
12	November 15, 1986	Sam Kinison	Church Lady boycott the show because of this night's host (Sam Kinison)
12	January 24, 1987	Joe Montana, Walter Payton	Shirley MacLaine (Jan Hooks), Walter Payton (Himself) and Joe Montana (Himself)
12	February 21, 1987	Willie Nelson	Church Lady and Willie Nelson sing together. Danny DeVito (Himself), Ann Landers (Nora Dunn), Willie Nelson (Himself).
12	March 28, 1987	Charlton Heston	Jim (Phil Hartman) and Tammy Faye Bakker (Jan Hooks)
12	May 23, 1987	Dennis Hopper	Dennis Hopper (Himself)
13	October 24, 1987	Sean Penn	Rashashimi Khadudi Hasumi-imi-humi (Jon Lovitz), Sean Penn (Himself)
13	December 5, 1987	Danny DeVito	Jessica Hahn (Jan Hooks), Danny DeVito (Himself)
13	February 27, 1988	Judge Reinhold	Pat Robertson (Al Franken) and Jimmy Swaggart (Phil Hartman)
14	November 5, 1988	Matthew Modine	Morton Downey Jr. (Himself)
15	December 16, 1989	Andie MacDowell	Nadia Comăneci (Jan Hooks), Leona Helmsley (Nora Dunn), Andie MacDowell (Herself)
15	February 24, 1990	Fred Savage	Enid (Fred Savage), Marla Maples (Jan Hooks) and Donald Trump (Phil Hartman)
15	March 17, 1990	Rob Lowe	Rob Lowe (Himself)
16	December 1, 1990	John Goodman	Saddam Hussein (Phil Hartman) and the Church Lady's mother (John Goodman)
22	October 26, 1996	Dana Carvey	O.J Simpson (Tim Meadows) & Madonna (Molly Shannon)
26	October 21, 2000	Dana Carvey	Hillary Clinton (Ana Gasteyer), Anne Heche (Chris Kattan) and Eminem (Chris Parnell)
36	February 5, 2011	Dana Carvey	The Kardashians (Nasim Pedrad, Abby Elliott, Vanessa Bayer) and Snooki (Bobby Moynihan)
41	May 7, 2016	Brie Larson	Ted Cruz (Taran Killam) and Donald Trump (Darrell Hammond)
50	December 7, 2024	Paul Mescal	Matt Gaetz (Sarah Sherman), Hunter Biden (David Spade) and Juan Soto (Marcello Hernández)

Additional appearances

- Church Potluck- December 6, 1986
- Christmas Eve- December 17, 1988
- The '90s- January 13, 1990
- Weekend Update- November 5, 2016

== Mr. Subliminal ==
Played by Kevin Nealon, he was originally an advertising executive (named Phil Maloney) who used subliminal messages to influence people. His appearances on Update utilized the subliminal technique (i.e. saying things rapidly and under his breath, in between sentences) to reveal what he is really thinking. For example, in an editorial on the 1994 caning of Michael Fay, he stated that:

"...the boy admitted to spray painting cars but he's only eighteen and young people often do stupid and impulsive things they later regret (Shannen Doherty). I happen to think [pause] that everyone's entitled to one mistake (Euro Disney). And I'm not saying there aren't [pause] those who I'd love to see get a good flogging (Urkel), it's just that [pause] I'm afraid we've become so insensitive that we've learned to accept the idea of a man's beating in public (Pee Wee Herman)."

Debuted October 11, 1986.

== Derek Stevens ("She choppin’ broccoli...") ==
An English singer/songwriter (played by Dana Carvey) is meeting with his record producers to go over his demo, which they soon discover he has failed to record. He insists, however, that he has written songs and he can play the songs for them live, and when they ask him to do so, he quickly makes up a song called "The Lady I Know". He then sits at the piano and begins sloppily faking his way through the song, which ultimately becomes an endless refrain of the chorus, "Choppin' broccoli" in various vocal styles and intonations. Upon hearing it, the producers appear to be awestruck by his lyrics, and are ecstatic about recording the song. Debuted October 11, 1986.

This song was originally in a Dana Carvey stand-up comedy routine about the vapidness of popular music.

Stevens returns in a later sketch, in which his producers try to convince him that his premature death might help the sales of his album. A fearful Stevens responds by hyping a new song, with the same tune as "The Lady I Know", but featuring different, though equally repetitive, lyrics and a similar endless refrain ("My pretty little lady! My pretty little gir-rl!") The producers are unimpressed.

Stevens appeared once more on SNL's 40th Anniversary Special in 2015, singing "Choppin' Broccoli".

Appearances

Season	Episode	Host	Notes
12	October 11, 1986	Sigourney Weaver	
12	December 13, 1986	Steve Guttenberg	
12	February 14, 1987	Bronson Pinchot	
13	February 13, 1988	Justine Bateman	

== The Sweeney Sisters ==
The Sweeney Sisters are a duo of party singers, Candy Sweeney (played by Jan Hooks) and her sister Liz (played by Nora Dunn). They normally sing cover medleys of pop standards in very high-pitched voices, a la Nick the Lounge Singer. Their medleys always include the first two lines of "The Trolley Song" ("Clang, clang, clang went the trolley...") about two-thirds of the way through, followed by a string of scatting. In these medleys the last word of one song often segues into the first word of the next. The sisters are usually seen performing at various U.S. hotel lounges, and their performances usually begin with "You must have pressed 'L' for 'lobby'! Come, join us." They were the opening act at the 40th Primetime Emmy Awards in 1988. Candy and Liz have a sister (a former member of the group), Audrey, who was played by Mary Tyler Moore. The Sweeneys' accompanist, Skip St.Thomas, was played by composer Marc Shaiman. Debuted October 18, 1986.

Appearances

Season	Episode	Host	Notes
12	October 18, 1986	Malcolm-Jamal Warner	
12	November 22, 1986	Robin Williams	
12	December 20, 1986	William Shatner	
12	January 31, 1987	Paul Shaffer	
12	March 28, 1987	Charlton Heston	
12	May 23, 1987	Dennis Hopper	
13	November 14, 1987	Robert Mitchum	
13	December 19, 1987	Paul Simon	
14	December 17, 1988	Melanie Griffith	
14	March 25, 1989	Mary Tyler Moore	

== Dr. Norma Hoeffering ==
A Nora Dunn character that debuted on October 18, 1986.

Background

Dr Norma is an expert in male-bashing books and she is openly lesbian but also willing to explore (in her next sketch she appears with her girlfriend Zena, portrayed by special guest Gwen Welles). Also she is the author of the noted bestseller Women Good Men Bad.

Appearances

Season	Episode	Host	Notes
12	October 18, 1986	Malcolm Jamal-Warner	In the Donahue sketch
12	November 15, 1986	Sam Kinison	In the Love Connection sketch (with Gwen Welles)

== Instant Coffee with Bill Smith ==
A Kevin Nealon sketch. Debuted October 18, 1986.

== The Two Sammies ==
A Dana Carvey and Kevin Nealon sketch. Debuted November 8, 1986.

== Miss Connie's Fable Nook ==
A Jan Hooks, Dana Carvey, Dennis Miller and Kevin Nealon sketch. Debuted November 8, 1986.

== The Jungle Room ==
A Phil Hartman and Jon Lovitz sketch.

Appearances

Season	Episode	Host	Notes
12	November 15, 1986	Sam Kinison	
12	January 24, 1987	Joe Montana, Walter Payton	
12	October 24, 1987	Sean Penn	
12	December 5, 1987	Danny DeVito	

== Ching Chang ==
Dana Carvey played the character Ching Chang (some sources spell his last name as "Change"), a typical Asian-American stereotype whose only goal in life is to put his chickens in their own show on Broadway. Debuted November 15, 1986.

Appearances

Season	Episode	Host	Notes
12	November 15, 1986	Sam Kinison	
12	January 31, 1987	Paul Shaffer	
12	February 28, 1987	Valerie Bertinelli	
12	May 9, 1987	Mark Harmon	
13	November 21, 1987	Candice Bergen	
16	November 10, 1990	Jimmy Smits	
26	October 21, 2000	Dana Carvey	

== The NFL Today ==
A parody of The NFL Today, with Phil Hartman impersonating Jimmy "The Greek" Snyder and Kevin Nealon impersonating Brent Musburger.

Appearances

Season	Episode	Host	Notes
12	January 24, 1987	Joe Montana, Walter Payton	
13	October 17, 1987	Steve Martin	
13	January 30, 1988	Carl Weathers	
15	April 14, 1990	Corbin Bernsen	

== Mace ==
A Phil Hartman sketch. Debuted January 24, 1987.

Appearances

Season	Episode	Host	Notes
12	January 24, 1987	Joe Montana, Walter Payton	
13	November 21, 1987	Candice Bergen	
15	March 17, 1990	Rob Lowe	
16	March 23, 1991	Jeremy Irons	

== Nightline ==
A parody of the late-night news program Nightline, with Dana Carvey impersonating its host Ted Koppel.

Appearances

Season	Episode	Host	Notes
12	February 14, 1987	Bronson Pinchot	
16	January 12, 1991	Joe Mantegna	
18	September 26, 1992	Nicolas Cage	

== Discover with Peter Graves ==
Phil Hartman impersonates actor Peter Graves in this series of sketches. It parodies actors hosting documentary series, portraying Graves as not being able to fully understand or comprehend the show's topics.

Appearances

Season	Episode	Host	Notes
12	February 28, 1987	Valerie Bertinelli	
12	April 11, 1987	John Lithgow	
13	October 24, 1987	Sean Penn	
13	January 23, 1988	Robin Williams	

== President Dexter ==
A Charlton Heston sketch. Debuted March 28, 1987.

Preceded by Recurring Saturday Night Live characters and sketches introduced 1985-86	Recurring Saturday Night Live characters and sketches (listed chronologically)	Succeeded by Recurring Saturday Night Live characters and sketches introduced 1987-88
