= The Church Lady =

Enid Strict
- Saturday Night Live character
- Dana Carvey as The Church Lady
- First appearance: October 11, 1986
- Last appearance: December 1, 1990 (regular); December 7, 2024 (guest: S50E08)
- Created by: Dana Carvey; Rosie Shuster
- Portrayed by: Dana Carvey

In-universe information
- Gender: Female
- Title: The Church Lady
- Occupation: Talk show host of Church Chat
- Religion: Christianity
- Nationality: American

Enid Strict, better known as The Church Lady, is a fictional recurring character portrayed by Dana Carvey on American sketch comedy television show Saturday Night Live. The character appeared on the show from 1986 to 1990, and episodically again in 1996, 2000, 2011, 2016, and 2024. She also appeared on The Dana Carvey Show in March 1996, reading a Top Ten List, "New Titles for Princess Diana."

== Development ==
Dana Carvey developed the character in his stand-up comedy act prior to joining SNL. He said, "At one point it was a schoolteacher being very condescending to kids as they made sailboats." Carvey decided to make the character a religious figure when his mother said his impersonation reminded her of women from their churchgoing days who would keep track of people's attendance. "Mom would bring a casserole to potluck dinners, and then feel inferior. I remember walking into church after our family had missed a few Sundays, and their turns of the heads, that 'Well! Good to see they finally made it!' attitude."

Writer Rosie Shuster helped Carvey develop the concept of the Church Chat talk show. Carvey recalled that he was prompted by executive producer Lorne Michaels to introduce the character (when it was still in SNL rehearsals) at a Neil Young concert at Madison Square Garden, which Church Lady interrupted, fussing and fuming: "What are we doing here? What's all this noise?"

The Church Lady made numerous appearances on SNL, and Nora Dunn recalled that "everybody loved that character."

== Character ==
The Church Lady is a mature woman named Enid Strict who is the uptight, smug, and pious host of her talk show Church Chat. Her show includes guests, usually celebrities whom she interviews, played by other cast members of SNL or by the celebrities themselves. However, the interviews are only a guise for her to call out the guests on their various alleged sins, which are often publicly known news events of the day. They initially receive sarcastic praise from her, until the interview degrades into a tirade against their apparent lack of piety and their secular lifestyles, culminating with her judgmental admonishments and condemnation. She often takes others to task for following the desires of their "tingling" and/or "engorged" "naughty parts."

Sometimes the Church Lady was accompanied by a character known as "Minister Bob," played by Chevy Chase. He seemed to be the only person the Church Lady admired. During a church picnic an inebriated woman interrupted the gathering, shocking all the old ladies present, and saying how the Church Lady acts so high and mighty but is out of touch with the problems of people in everyday life. Minister Bob then acts more down to Earth than the Church Lady, saying it is the responsibility of a pastor to deal with people with problems. When he seems to be leading the woman into why problem drinking is a bad idea, he ends with saying "...because of SATAN!", and joins the Church Lady in her Superior Dance.

The Church Lady made her first appearance on the season premiere of season 12. It was not until the twelfth episode of that season, where Willie Nelson performs a duet of "You Don't Bring Me Flowers" with the Church Lady, that the character became more popular. The Jim Bakker and Tammy Faye Bakker scandal was parodied multiple times in sketches and helped make the Church Lady one of SNL's signature characters.

== Notable appearances ==
Season	Episode	Host	Notes
12	January 24, 1987	Joe Montana, Walter Payton	Joe Montana and Walter Payton join Church Lady for a game of football. Montana throws a touchdown pass to Church Lady after she distracts Payton, who was playing defense against her. At the end of the sketch, all three do the Superior Dance.
12	March 28, 1987	Charlton Heston	Jim (played by Phil Hartman) and Tammy Faye Bakker (Jan Hooks) are interviewed about at the sex scandal involving Jim Bakker and Jessica Hahn.
13	October 24, 1987	Sean Penn	Actor Sean Penn is interviewed. Church Lady refers to Penn as "Sin" and makes numerous references to his then-wife Madonna and her overt sexuality, claiming Madonna "doesn't quite live up to her namesake." Penn becomes angry at Church Lady's criticisms and eventually throws a punch, hitting her directly in the nose. Carvey later recalled that he was genuinely scared because Penn (who was well known for losing his temper) came dangerously close to actually hitting him.
13	December 5, 1987	Danny DeVito	Church Lady interviews Danny DeVito. Jessica Hahn (Jan Hooks) talks about her Playboy magazine photoshoot.
15	February 24, 1990	Fred Savage	Actor Fred Savage plays the Church Lady's niece, Enid. Enid is dressed in a miniature version of the Church Lady's outfit and glasses, and says all of the familiar admonishing catchphrases, including doing the Superior Dance. Donald Trump (Phil Hartman) and Marla Maples (Jan Hooks) stop by to talk about Trump's then high-profile divorce from Ivana Trump.
15	March 17, 1990	Rob Lowe	Rob Lowe is asked pointed questions about his sex tape scandal, but cuts a deal with the Church Lady where in return for not bringing it up, Lowe submits to corporal punishment at her hands. However, Lowe began to enjoy being spanked by the Church Lady, who took this as a sign that Satan had possessed Lowe's butt and began screaming for Satan to leave the actor's body.
16	December 1, 1990	John Goodman	Church Lady interviews Saddam Hussein (Phil Hartman) alongside her mother (John Goodman).
16	February 16, 1991	Roseanne Barr	In a parody of the film Misery, Roseanne kidnaps Dana Carvey and holds him hostage until he does his Church Lady impressions and gets the facial expressions and voice just right.
22	October 26, 1996	Dana Carvey	Church Lady interviews O.J. Simpson (Tim Meadows) and Madonna (Molly Shannon).
26	October 21, 2000	Dana Carvey	Church Lady interviews Anne Heche (Chris Kattan) about her bisexuality, and talks to Hillary Clinton (Ana Gasteyer) and Eminem (Chris Parnell).
36	February 5, 2011	Dana Carvey	Church Lady interviews the Kardashian sisters (played by Nasim Pedrad, Vanessa Bayer, and Abby Elliott) and Snooki from Jersey Shore (Bobby Moynihan), whom she tries to exorcise. Church Lady becomes enraptured and aroused by Justin Bieber before being settled down by God.
41	May 7, 2016	Brie Larson	Ted Cruz (Taran Killam) and Donald Trump (Darrell Hammond) are Church Lady's guests. Cruz, who had been recently called "Lucifer in the flesh" by John Boehner, reappeared mid-sketch as the devil after Church Lady calls Trump "an orange mannequin".
42	November 5, 2016	Benedict Cumberbatch	Church Lady stops by Weekend Update to talk about the November 2016 presidential election, describing it as a choice between "a bitter, female android from the '90s...or a riverboat gambler with a big tummy and an orange head".
50	December 7, 2024	Paul Mescal	In the cold open, the Church Lady speaks with Matt Gaetz (Sarah Sherman), Hunter Biden (David Spade) and Juan Soto (Marcello Hernandez).

== Appearances outside SNL ==
In a teaser trailer for the 1990 film Opportunity Knocks (available on that film's DVD), the Church Lady interrupts, warning viewers not to see the film and is punched in the face and knocked to the floor by Dana Carvey who introduces himself. The Church Lady retaliates and the fight continues off-screen as the trailer ends.

The Church Lady appeared on ABC's The Dana Carvey Show as part of a larger sketch where a viewer letter asked whether Dana Carvey's SNL characters were to appear on the show. The sketch responded by claiming that ABC used Disney's high-profile lawyers to engage NBC in a hostile takeover, gaining the rights to Carvey's SNL characters, as well as some of the IPs of David Letterman's show on CBS. It then cuts to the Church Lady reading David Letterman's Top Ten List.

== Popular catchphrases ==
- "Well, isn't that special?"
- "How con-VEEN-ient!"
- "Now, who could it be? Could it be ...Satan?" (during a Christmas-themed December broadcast, using a magnetic spelling board, she rearranged letters spelling "Santa" to instead spell "Satan")
- "We like ourselves, don't we?" (usually directed at a guest on her show)
- "Ah yes, from the Chippewa word meaning drop your shorts, we don't have much time." (usually directed towards a guest)

== See also ==
- List of recurring Saturday Night Live characters and sketches
