= Recurring Saturday Night Live characters and sketches introduced 1988–89 =

The following is a list of recurring Saturday Night Live characters and sketches introduced between October 8, 1988, and May 20, 1989, the fourteenth season of SNL.

== Mr. Short-Term Memory ==
A series of three (to date) sketches—"The Blind Date", "The Hospital Visit", and "The Game Show"—featuring Tom Hanks as San Bernardino advertising exec Jeff Morrow whose life (to say nothing of everybody else around him) has not been the same since a pear fell from a tree and hit him on the head. Now burdened by untreatable chronic amnesia, Jeff sows chaos and reaps alienation—some of it mutual—wherever he goes since his recollection abilities (and his attention span) are not only very limited, but also highly erratic.

The series debuted October 8, 1988. All three episodes co-starred Victoria Jackson and Phil Hartman; the third also co-starred Tony Randall.

Appearances

Season	Episode	Host	Notes
14	October 8, 1988	Tom Hanks	"The Blind Date"
15	February 17, 1990	Tom Hanks	"The Hospital Visit"
16	December 8, 1990	Tom Hanks	"The Game Show"

== Celebrity Restaurant ==
A Dana Carvey sketch. Debuted December 3, 1988.

== Plug Away with Harvey Fierstein ==
Jon Lovitz impersonates actor Harvey Fierstein, hosting a faux talk show.

Appearances

Season	Episode	Host	Notes
14	December 10, 1988	Kevin Kline	
14	February 11, 1989	Ted Danson	
15	October 21, 1989	Kathleen Turner	

== Tony Trailer ==
A Kevin Nealon sketch. Debuted January 21, 1989.

== Stuart Rankin, All Things Scottish ==
A Mike Myers sketch. This sketch featured Myers as the Scottish owner of a Scots-themed gift shop, who bellowed at his customers, "If it's not Scottish, it's crap!" This phrase went on to become a minor SNL-inspired catchphrase in the late 1980s. Debuted January 28, 1989.

A second sketch was performed at dress rehearsal on January 20, 1990, with Christopher Walken playing Rankin's son Angus. The sketch was cut after dress rehearsal, but was reused with slight revisions at the start of the next season with Kyle MacLachlan playing Angus.

Other characters in later skits included Tim Meadows as Rankin's employee Rodney, and Kiefer Sutherland as Ronnie Rankin, Stuart Rankin's brother.

Appearances

Season	Episode	Host	Notes
14	January 28, 1989	Tony Danza	Weekend Update
16	September 29, 1990	Kyle MacLachlan	
17	November 2, 1991	Kiefer Sutherland	
19	February 5, 1994	Patrick Stewart	

== Grumpy Old Man ==
Portrayed by Dana Carvey, he was an embittered archetypical grandfather figure with white hair, glasses, and a sour sneer. He would appear as a Weekend Update commentator complaining about the state of the world, mainly in regard to many modern conveniences. His complaints always included differences between today and "his day".

- EXAMPLES
  - "In my day, we didn't have safety standards for toys. We got rusty nails and big bags of broken glass!"
  - "In my day, we entertained ourselves; we didn't need moving pictures! In my day, the only show in town was called 'Stare At the Sun'!"
  - "In my day, we didn't need technology, like these tiny and efficient clip-on microphones. We had microphones the size of watermelons. They were cumbersome and blocked your face; the only sound that came out of them was static!"
  - "In my day, we didn't need waterbeds. You slept butt-naked on a huge pile of double-edged razor blades!"
  - "In my day, the number-one game in town was 'Chew the Bark Off the Tree'!"
  - "In my day, we didn't need facial wipes. When you turned 17, you were given the family handkerchief!"
  - "In my day, we didn't need dental floss or mouthwash. You picked your teeth with barbed wire and gargled with battery acid!"
  - "In my day, we didn't need seatbelts to restrain you if your car crashed. If you stopped suddenly, you knew exactly where you were going: straight through the windshield!"
  - "In my day, we didn't need bottled drinking water. You just drank raw sewage!"
  - "In my day, we didn't need virtual reality. You took a set of jumper cables and hooked yourself up to a half-zillion-volt electrical generator!"
  - "In my day, we didn't need ATMs. There was just one bank in each state, and it was open just one hour a year! That was the story of your life: You were born, you got in line, and you died!"

All of these rants would end with "And that's the way it was, and we (you) liked it! We (You) loved it!".

Debuted February 11, 1989 in a sketch with Jon Lovitz.

Appearances

Season	Episode	Host	Notes
15	January 13, 1990	Ed O'Neill	
15	February 24, 1990	Fred Savage	
15	April 14, 1990	Corbin Bernsen	
16	October 6, 1990	Susan Lucci	
16	December 15, 1990	Dennis Quaid	
17	February 22, 1992	Roseanne Arnold, Tom Arnold	

== Wayne's World ==
Mike Myers and Dana Carvey play two metalheads and best friends who hosted a cable access television program from Wayne's parents' basement. Myers had previously played the character of Wayne on several Canadian television shows, and this sketch was the basis of a popular feature film released in 1992. Debuted February 18, 1989.

Appearances

Season	Episode	Host	Notes
14	February 18, 1989	Leslie Nielsen	
14	March 25, 1989	Mary Tyler Moore	
14	May 13, 1989	Wayne Gretzky	
15	September 30, 1989	Bruce Willis	
15	December 2, 1989	John Goodman	
15	January 13, 1990	Ed O'Neill	
15	February 17, 1990	Tom Hanks	
15	March 24, 1990	Debra Winger	
15	May 19, 1990	Candice Bergen	
16	December 1, 1990	John Goodman	
16	January 19, 1991	Sting	
16	March 23, 1991	Jeremy Irons	
16	May 11, 1991	Delta Burke	
17	September 28, 1991	Michael Jordan	
17	January 18, 1992	Chevy Chase	
17	April 11, 1992	Sharon Stone	
18	December 5, 1992	Tom Arnold	
19	November 20, 1993	Nicole Kidman	
19	May 14, 1994	Heather Locklear	
36	February 5, 2011	Dana Carvey	
40	February 15, 2015	Steve Martin	SNL 40th Anniversary Special. Counted down SNL's Top 10

== Cooking with the Anal Retentive Chef ==
This series of sketches featured Phil Hartman as Gene, a fastidious chef who could not bear to be in the presence of anything cluttered or dirty. After peeling some vegetables he advised throwing the peels away by wrapping them in paper toweling, then aluminum foil, then putting them in a paper bag that was then to be sealed with scotch tape. Gene never completed any of his recipes; he always became too distracted by the effects of his psychological complex, and ran out of time. The majority of these sketches featured the Gene character as a chef, however, he also played an anal retentive sportsman and home improvement expert. The sketch was presented as a PBS program sponsored by the Chubb Group.

Appearances

Season	Episode	Host	Notes
14	April 1, 1989	Mel Gibson	
14	May 13, 1989	Wayne Gretzky	"Fishing with the Anal Retentive Sportsman"
15	September 30, 1989	Bruce Willis	"Home Improvement with the Anal Retentive Carpenter"
15	December 2, 1989	John Goodman	
15	May 12, 1990	Andrew Dice Clay	

== Tales of Ribaldry ==
Tales of Ribaldry was a series of sketches starring Jon Lovitz as Regency era dandy Evelyn Quince, presenting supposedly "racy, randy, ribald!" tales, presented initially as "bodice rippers" which, to the host's clear and vocal dismay, develop into rather straightforward, "not very ribald at all!" sexual encounters between consenting adults.

Saturday Night Live later featured a one-time sketch called "Tales of Irony" which used a similar premise. Jason Alexander played the host who would become clearly agitated when the scenes developed into quite bland pieces with very little irony at all.

Appearances

Season	Episode	Host	Notes
14	April 1, 1989	Mel Gibson	
15	February 17, 1990	Tom Hanks	

== Sprockets ==
Mike Myers plays Dieter (no last name), a disaffected West German expressionist/minimalist. Debuted April 15, 1989.

Appearances

Season	Episode	Host	Notes
14	April 15, 1989	Dolly Parton	
14	May 20, 1989	Steve Martin	
15	September 30, 1989	Bruce Willis	
15	November 18, 1989	Woody Harrelson	Dieter interviews the director of such independent films as: The Dead Coat; Irritant #4; and Here, Child, Finish Your Nothing.
15	March 17, 1990	Rob Lowe	Dieter's Dance Party (spoof of American Bandstand); features a German-language commercial for Clearasil—"Macht das pimplen kaput!"
16	September 29, 1990	Kyle MacLachlan	Germany's Most Disturbing Home Videos (spoof of America's Funniest...), co-hosted by the star of Munich's long-running sitcom Who Are You To Accuse Me?
16	December 15, 1990	Dennis Quaid	
16	April 13, 1991	Catherine O'Hara	
17	February 15, 1992	Jason Priestley	Love Werks
17	May 16, 1992	Woody Harrelson	Eurotrash park to counter the newly opened Euro Disney park
19	November 20, 1993	Nicole Kidman	das ist jeopärdy!
22	March 22, 1997	Mike Myers	

Additional appearances

- Dieter in Space: December 16, 1989
- Dieter's Dream: March 20, 1993

== Lothar of the Hill People ==
A Mike Myers sketch (he played the title role of a prehistoric tribal chieftain) which also featured Jon Lovitz and Phil Hartman as fellow chieftains. It was based on a Dungeons & Dragons character Myers had as a teenager. The premise had Lothar as a host around a campfire meeting fierce strangers who came to attack him, but he would convince them to stay and parley instead, having his "squire" fetch them a flagon of mead. The conversation would inevitably come around to the topic on whether the men "walked with a woman" and the pitfalls of doing so. Tennis champion Chris Evert once appeared as a female tribal chief known as She-beast, bearing a makeshift tennis racket as her weapon. The title sequence used footage from Conan the Barbarian. Debuted April 15, 1989.

Appearances

Season	Episode	Host	Notes
14	April 15, 1989	Dolly Parton	
15	November 11, 1989	Chris Evert	
15	January 13, 1990	Ed O'Neill	
15	February 24, 1990	Fred Savage	

== Toonces, the Cat Who Could Drive a Car ==
Dana Carvey and Victoria Jackson play a couple who allow their pet cat Toonces to drive their car; Toonces subsequently drives the car off a cliff. The sketch debuted May 20, 1989 with Steve Martin in the role subsequently played by Carvey.

Toonces was the family pet of Lyle and Brenda Clark, an enthusiastic couple who would allow their cat to drive the family car. At first, they were delighted that their cat had such an ability, but were always horrified to discover (too late) that Toonces was actually not a skilled driver at all. The running gag was the punch line: "See, I told you he could drive! Just not very well!" Inevitably, Toonces would drive the car over a cliff whenever he got behind the wheel. This sequence was characterized by someone in the car yelling "Toonces, look out!" with the Toonces puppet appearing to scream also, followed by the car falling off a cliff, and sometimes exploding (as shown in a series of stock footage scenes—sometimes the same one used multiple times within a sketch).

Toonces was portrayed by a live cat (for the title sequence and certain close-up driving scenes) and a puppet. The puppet was made up of three parts. The first part was a head and torso piece, which was a simplistic rendering of a grey-and-white striped short-haired tabby cat. The other two parts consisted of two separate paws, which were manipulated so as to simulate Toonces actually steering the car.

This sketch first appeared on the show that Steve Martin hosted when he broke Buck Henry's record for most hosting stints.

In 1992, NBC aired a half-hour Toonces special. Toonces, the Cat Who Could Drive a Car (1992) was a prime time special that aired on February 14, 1992. The special featured the first half of the first Toonces sketch and "The Tooncinator", both from SNL, plus one new Toonces sketch, "Toonces Without A Cause"; three short little pieces before the commercial breaks to remind you it was a Toonces special: "Toonces The Cat's World Of Nature", "Toonces & Spunky Play Ping Pong", "Toonces Mows The Lawn", and the end credits featuring "Toonces Flies A Plane".

The special also featured a few new non-Toonces sketches.

- Coach Dobbs in "The Big Game""
- "Scruffy the Rat"
- "Abe Lincoln and His Time Machine"
- "The Fugitive Couple"
- Zactu & Mondo from Way, Way Beyond-O in "A-door-able Martians""

The special was released on video as The Best Of Saturday Night Live: Toonces and Friends.

Toonces was set to return as "Toonces the Texting Cat" for an OnStar promotion during an SNL 35th Anniversary special in 2010, but plans to produce this show were scrapped.

On the September 27, 2008, episode of Saturday Night Live, the stock footage of a car going over a cliff was reused in a different sketch. It was edited so that after going over the cliff, the film reversed, the car returned to the cliff top, and then exploded as it landed on the ground.

=== Sketches ===
- May 20, 1989, host: Steve Martin: "Toonces, the Cat Who Could Drive a Car". Lyle and Brenda discover that Toonces can drive, just not very well. "I saw him up there fooling around at the steering wheel. I guess I just assumed he could drive." Later, they worry about Toonces' upcoming driver's test. "That written part is pretty hard". Kevin Nealon is the driving instructor, and off they go, but predictably, they end up going over a cliff.
- December 2, 1989, host: John Goodman: "Toonces & Martians". Brenda and Lyle are out with Toonces when they are approached by Martians. Toonces escapes and drives into a nearby forest rangers building. He types out a message that his family is being held captive and persuades the rangers to get in the car with him. Over the cliff they go. After reaching the Martians, they all go for a ride in the friendly aliens' spaceship, with Toonces piloting. They crash into the Washington Monument.
- February 10, 1990, host: Quincy Jones: Miss Daisy (Jan Hooks) complains to her chauffeur (Jones) about his driving. He quits on the spot, jumping out of the moving car and causing it to crash. As Daisy recuperates, her son (Phil Hartman) tells her that he got a new chauffeur, one that "wouldn't talk back". It is Toonces, and the usual resolution follows.
- March 24, 1990, host: Debra Winger: "Urban Toonces". Toonces appears wearing a cowboy hat at the bar of Sis (Winger) and Bud (Carvey) and orders a drink. When asked for ID, he produces a suspended driver's license that indicates that he is only four years old. They reluctantly agree to serve him, figuring that Toonces would be 28 in human years, but only after checking to see that he has real money, fearing Toonces might attempt to pay with dead birds. Toonces later rides the bar's mechanical bull, garnering much acclaim. Bud and Sis ride home with Toonces, with Sis worried about letting Toonces drive after drinking. Bud is not worried at all, but as usual, they go over a cliff.
- May 19, 1990, host: Candice Bergen: "Toonces vs. Spunky". Bergen and her cat, Spunky, are visiting the Clark household, watching home movies of Toonces crashing in various vacation spots (Niagara Falls, Grand Canyon), and even a clip of Toonces as a kitten, crashing a toy car over a small rock wall. Bergen informs everyone that Spunky has just finished driving school, and wants to give everyone a ride. Toonces takes Spunky's place by chloroforming Spunky and impersonating him.
- November 17, 1990, host: Dennis Hopper: "Toonces' Dream". Toonces is dreaming that he is in charge of the Baby Chick Division. He nods when told he needs to transport some baby chicks unsupervised, and is praised by his family. He also talks in both English and French. The dream ends with the car seemingly suspended in mid-air, having just driven over a cliff, before it crashes to the ground.
- November 16, 1991, host: Linda Hamilton: "The Tooncinator". Sarah Connor (Linda Hamilton) and her son John (Edward Furlong) are trying to escape from the Terminator (Phil Hartman), but the Terminator has come to inform them about the robot cat the Tooncinator, who can drive a car ("but not very well," the Terminator amends). The Tooncinator arrives and is impervious to both car crashes and gun fire. Eventually, Sarah stops the car over the terrified Terminator's objections, correctly deducing that the Tooncinator just wants to be their kitty. The Tooncinator then accidentally drives them off a cliff.
- February 14, 1992 (from the special): "Toonces the Cat's World of Nature". A parody of nature shows, ostensibly narrated by Toonces himself, in which the lizard is a "bad animal" because when you hit it with your paw, the tail breaks off and the lizard escapes.
- February 14, 1992 (from the special): "Toonces Without a Cause". A parody of Rebel Without a Cause. Lyle & Brenda are portrayed as Leave it to Beaver-esque parents who are worried about Toonces' rebellious streak as of late, which includes playing bongo drums, stealing hubcaps, and being overly concerned about his hair, which is styled into a pompadour. Lyle is reluctant to talk to Toonces until he steals the family car (Lyle exclaims "He took the Dodge", though the car is really a 1950s Plymouth), to joyride with his human friends. As usual, the car crashes (the police say, though, that no one was hurt), and Toonces is arrested. Presumably, Toonces is bailed out of jail and thereafter, his pompadour is cut off. Lyle is convinced that Toonces has learned his lesson and lets him take the family out for a drive. Unfortunately, another crash is inevitable.
- February 14, 1992 (from the special): "Toonces & Spunky Play Ping Pong". Toonces and Spunky (an orange tabby) are engaged in a spirited ping-pong match, as an amazed Lyle and Brenda look on.
- February 14, 1992 (from the special): "Toonces Mows The Lawn"
- February 14, 1992 (from the special): "Toonces Flies a Plane". A POV of a plane being flown badly while the end credits roll.
- April 11, 1992, host: Sharon Stone: "Flippy, the Flipping Chihuahua". ("It's Flippy, the flippingest chihuahua you'll ever meet!") However, Flippy flips into the street and is run over by Toonces.
- February 13, 1993, host: Alec Baldwin: Jane Pauley (Julia Sweeney) and Stone Phillips (Mike Myers) apologize for recent NBC mishaps, such as the Olympics Triplecast, letting David Letterman go to CBS, and a recent skit in which Mike Myers and Dana Carvey made fun of Chelsea Clinton. Stripped of their limousine privileges, they leave in a car service sedan, with Toonces behind the wheel. After crashing the car, Toonces meows the famous opening line (courtesy of subtitles) "Live from New York, it's Saturday Night", making Toonces quite possibly the only puppet ever to say the phrase.
- April 17, 1993, host: Kirstie Alley: Isabelle (Kirstie Alley) and Penelope (Julia Sweeney) are riding in a horse-drawn carriage discussing their futures. But they are going too fast. It is not the regular driver! "It's Toonces! The Cat Who Could Drive a Horse-Drawn Carriage!" The whole group goes over a beautiful cliff.

Preceded by Recurring Saturday Night Live characters and sketches introduced 1987–88	Recurring Saturday Night Live characters and sketches (listed chronologically)	Succeeded by Recurring Saturday Night Live characters and sketches introduced 1989–90
