= Love for Rent =

2005 film

- Directed by: Shane Edelman
- Written by: Andrew Miles, story by Brian D. Young
- Produced by: Terence Michael
- Starring: Angie Cepeda; Ken Marino; Martita Roca; Nora Dunn
- Cinematography: David Rush Morrison
- Edited by: Gabriel Wrye
- Music by: Jeff Cardoni
- Production company: MiamiLA Entertainment
- Distributed by: MiamiLA Entertainment; HBO Home Video (2006) (USA) (DVD)
- Release date: 26 August 2005
- Running time: 96 minutes
- Countries: United States; Colombia
- Language: Spanish/English

Love for Rent is a 2005 American-Colombian romantic comedy film directed by Shane Edelman. It stars Angie Cepeda, Ken Marino, Nora Dunn, and Martita Roca.

== Plot ==
Sofia (Angie Cepeda) is a Colombian college student who is struggling with immigration issues in Los Angeles. Looking for solutions to her situation, she decides to become a surrogate mother for a wealthy couple.

== Cast ==
- Angie Cepeda as Sofia
- Ken Marino as Dr. Neil Gardner
- Martita Roca as Monica
- Nora Dunn as Helen Bauman
- Jim Piddock as Frank Bauman
- Max Burkholder as Max
- Brad Rowe as Jesse
- Richard Speight Jr. as George
- Hunter Johnson as Zoe

== Awards ==
- New York International Latino Film Festival: Won “Audience Award” for Best Feature Film (2005)

== Independent reviews ==
- Variety: Love for Rent
- Film Intuition: Love for Rent
- DVD Verdict: Love for Rent
