= Saturday Night Live season 14 =

Saturday Night Live
- Season 14
- No. of episodes: 20

Release
- Original network: NBC
- Original release: October 8, 1988 – May 20, 1989

Season chronology
- ← Previous season 13 Next → season 15

The fourteenth season of Saturday Night Live, an American sketch comedy series, originally aired in the United States on NBC between October 8, 1988, and May 20, 1989.

A new show logo was used starting with this season. It was made up of the words SATURDAY + NIGHT + LIVE styled in a circle. It was used until the end of the show's 20th season in 1995.

This season notably saw the death of a second original cast member, Gilda Radner, who died on the day of the season finale from ovarian cancer. In memory of Radner, Steve Martin showed a clip from the "Dancing in the Dark" sketch from the 1978 episode hosted by Martin in lieu of his planned monologue.

This season introduced the "Wayne's World" skits.

== Cast ==
Mike Myers made his debut as a cast member midseason. The first Wayne's World sketch aired on February 18, 1989. Ben Stiller had a very brief stint as a featured player. His short film The Hustler of Money had impressed producers and was aired in season 12. Stiller ended up leaving after only four episodes because he wanted to focus more on making short films, as opposed to performing solely sketch comedy. Al Franken returned to being an occasionally credited featured player, beginning with this season's third episode. He was previously a featured player for some of the 79–80 season and the final episode of the 85–86 season.

=== Cast roster ===
**Repertory players**

- Dana Carvey
- Nora Dunn
- Phil Hartman
- Jan Hooks
- Victoria Jackson
- Jon Lovitz
- **Dennis Miller**
- Kevin Nealon

**Featured players**

- A. Whitney Brown
- Al Franken (first episode: October 22, 1988)
- Mike Myers (first episode: January 21, 1989)
- Ben Stiller (first episode: March 25, 1989 / last episode: April 22, 1989)

bold denotes Weekend Update anchor

Mike Myers and Al Franken are each credited in the opening montage for nine of this season's 20 episodes. A. Whitney Brown is credited for seven episodes, while Ben Stiller is credited for four episodes.

== Episodes ==
No. overall	No. in season	Host	Musical guest(s)	Original release date
247	1	Tom Hanks	Keith Richards	October 8, 1988
Credited Featured Players: (none); Keith Richards performs "Take It So Hard" and "Struggle". Richards also appeared during the opening monologue.; Jim Downey appeared as Paul McElroy in the "First Citywide Change Bank" sketches.; Contains the "Bush-Dukakis Debate" sketch. Jeff Renaudo made a cameo appearance in the sketch as Dan Quayle.; First Appearance of "Mr. Short-Term Memory" sketch.; Jim Downey, Conan O'Brien, and Bob Odenkirk are bit players.
248	2	Matthew Broderick	The Sugarcubes	October 15, 1988
Credited Featured Players: A. Whitney Brown; The Sugarcubes performs "Birthday" and "Motorcrash".; Catherine O'Hara and Laurie Metcalf appear in the film "Laurie Has a Story".; Contains the infamous "Nude Beach" sketch, written by Conan O'Brien and Robert Smigel, in which the word 'penis' is mentioned 43 times.
249	3	John Larroquette	Randy Newman & Mark Knopfler	October 22, 1988
Credited Featured Players: A. Whitney Brown; Randy Newman and Mark Knopfler perform "It's Money That Matters" and "Dixie Flyer".; Dana Carvey appeared as Dennis Miller on Weekend Update.; Al Franken's first episode back as a featured player after last being credited for the season 11 finale.
250	4	Matthew Modine	Edie Brickell and New Bohemians	November 5, 1988
Credited Featured Players: A. Whitney Brown, Al Franken; Edie Brickell performs "What I Am", and "Little Miss S."; Morton Downey Jr. appears in the "Church Chat" sketch.
251	5	Demi Moore	Johnny Clegg & Savuka	November 12, 1988
Credited Featured Players: Al Franken; Johnny Clegg & Savuka perform "I Call Your Name" and "Take My Heart Away".; Kirsten Dunst appeared in the cold opening as one of George Bush's (Dana Carvey) grandchildren.
252	6	John Lithgow	Tracy Chapman	November 19, 1988
Credited Featured Players: A. Whitney Brown, Al Franken; Tracy Chapman performs "Mountains o' Things," "Freedom Now," and "Baby Can I Hold You".
253	7	Danny DeVito	The Bangles	December 3, 1988
Credited Featured Players: (none); The Bangles perform "In Your Room" and "A Hazy Shade of Winter".; DeVito's Twins co-star Arnold Schwarzenegger appears in the "Hans & Franz" opening sketch and in the monologue.; Guest appearance by Maria Shriver.
254	8	Kevin Kline	Bobby McFerrin	December 10, 1988
Credited Featured Players: A. Whitney Brown; Bobby McFerrin performs "Drive" and "The Star-Spangled Banner".; First Appearance of Jon Lovitz as Harvey Fierstein in "Plug Away with Harvey Fierstein" sketch.; This episode was dedicated to Roy Orbison, the musical guest of the 1986-1987 season finale, who died on December 6. At the end of the episode, Kline introduces Roy's performance of Crying from that show as a tribute.
255	9	Melanie Griffith	Little Feat	December 17, 1988
Credited Featured Players: (none); Little Feat performs "Let It Roll" and "Hate to Lose Your Lovin".; Dana Carvey appeared as Dennis Miller on Weekend Update.; Don Johnson appears during the goodnights.
256	10	John Malkovich	Anita Baker	January 21, 1989
Credited Featured Players: A. Whitney Brown, Mike Myers; Anita Baker performs "Giving You the Best That I Got" and "Just Because".; Mike Myers' first episode as a cast member.
257	11	Tony Danza	John Hiatt	January 28, 1989
Credited Featured Players: Al Franken, Mike Myers; John Hiatt & The Goners perform "Paper Thin" and "Slow Turning".; Joe Montana appears in a replay of the "Honest Man" sketch from Season 12.
258	12	Ted Danson	Luther Vandross	February 11, 1989
Credited Featured Players: Mike Myers; Luther Vandross performs "She Won't Talk to Me" and "For You to Love".
259	13	Leslie Nielsen	Cowboy Junkies	February 18, 1989
Credited Featured Players: Al Franken, Mike Myers; Cowboy Junkies perform "Sweet Jane" and "Misguided Angel".; The first "Wayne's World" sketch appeared in this episode.; Kim Alexis, Beverly Johnson and Cheryl Tiegs appear in the "Pat Stevens Show" sketch.
260	14	Glenn Close	Gipsy Kings	February 25, 1989
Credited Featured Players: A. Whitney Brown; Gipsy Kings perform "Bamboleo" and "Djobi Djoba".; William Hurt appears during the monologue.
261	15	Mary Tyler Moore	Elvis Costello	March 25, 1989
Credited Featured Players: Mike Myers, Ben Stiller; Elvis Costello performs "Veronica" and "Let Him Dangle". (This marked Costello's return to SNL following his infamous performance of Radio, Radio 11 years earlier which resulted in Costello being banned from appearing on the show again. As of 2017, Costello is one of three people who have had a ban from SNL lifted.); Ben Stiller's first episode as a cast member.
262	16	Mel Gibson	Living Colour	April 1, 1989
Credited Featured Players: Al Franken, Ben Stiller; Living Colour performs "Cult of Personality" and "Open Letter (To a Landlord)".; Danny Glover appears in the "Lethal Weapon VI" sketch.; First Appearance of "Cooking with the Anal Retentive Chef" (Phil Hartman)
263	17	Dolly Parton	Dolly Parton	April 15, 1989
Credited Featured Players: Mike Myers, Ben Stiller; Dolly Parton performs "Why'd You Come in Here Lookin' Like That" and "White Limozeen".; This episode marks the debut of "Sprockets" featuring Mike Myers as Dieter.
264	18	Geena Davis	John Mellencamp	April 22, 1989
Credited Featured Players: Mike Myers, Ben Stiller; John Mellencamp performs "Pop Singer" and "Jackie Brown".; Ben Stiller's final episode as a cast member.
265	19	Wayne Gretzky	Fine Young Cannibals	May 13, 1989
Credited Featured Players: Al Franken, Mike Myers; Fine Young Cannibals perform "She Drives Me Crazy" and "Good Thing".; Gretzky's wife Janet Jones appears in the "Wayne's World" sketch.; This episode was released as part of the three-episode "Best of Saturday Night Live: Special Edition" VHS (1992).
266	20	Steve Martin	Tom Petty & the Heartbreakers	May 20, 1989
Credited Featured Players: A. Whitney Brown, Al Franken, Mike Myers; Tom Petty & The Heartbreakers perform "Runnin' Down a Dream" and "Free Fallin'".; In the opening monologue, Steve Martin visibly struggled to hold back tears as he paid tribute to Gilda Radner, who had died of cancer in the afternoon on the day of the broadcast. Martin and Radner's "Dancing in the Dark" sketch, originally shown in episode 64 in 1978, was also offered in tribute. The show's bandleader G.E. Smith, who was also Radner's ex-husband, wore a black armband throughout the live show.; Timothy Busfield appears in the "New Coneheads" sketch.; Paulina Porizkova appears in the "Get to Know Me" sketch.; The first Toonces sketch appears in this episode.
