= Three Moons Over Milford =

American television series (2006)

- Created by: Howard Chesley; Jon Boorstin
- Starring: Elizabeth McGovern; Sam Murphy; Teresa Celentano; Nora Dunn; Samantha Quan; Rob Boltin
- Country of origin: United States
- Original language: English
- No. of seasons: 1
- No. of episodes: 8

Production
- Running time: 43 minutes
- Production companies: Three Moons Film; Touchstone Television

Original release
- Network: ABC Family
- Release: August 6 – September 24, 2006

Three Moons Over Milford is an American science fiction dramedy television series set in a picturesque small town in southern Vermont. Shortly before the series begins, an asteroid hits the Moon, shattering it into three fragments, threatening to eventually fall to Earth and end life. Thus, the continuous threat of an imminent "Judgment Day" causes many people to question their lives and live them to extremes by quitting jobs, indulging vices and living as if each day were their last.

The show was cancelled because of low ratings in September 2006.

== Characters ==
=== Laura Davis ===
Mother of the Davis family, who struggles with the emotional strain and major changes occurring in the wake of the Moon incident. Her husband, Carl, a local industry leader, abandoned the family after the Moon incident to live in a yurt some distance away from the family home, and has since left the country to climb the Seven Summits. Shortly thereafter, funds are discovered missing from Carl's company, and the family's property and assets are seized, leaving the family homeless. Laura starts work for local attorney Mack McIntyre and they become close. Laura is played by Elizabeth McGovern.

=== Albert "Mack" McIntyre ===
A small town, down-to-earth lawyer who helps the Davises in Lydia's arson case. A growing attraction develops between Mack and Laura Davis, which is nudged along when Mack's meddlesome mother hires Laura as Mack's secretary in order to drive a wedge between Mack and an old flame. Mack is played by Rob Boltin.

=== Lydia Davis ===
Teenage daughter of the Davis family. Her attempt to use a Wicca ceremony to save the Earth resulted in the accidental arson of the local high school. Even though she continues to defend the event as an accident, she is known as the "fire starter." She moves to a new school, where she is allowed nothing flammable and starts to fall in with a bad crowd. She is played by Teresa Celentano.

=== Alex Davis ===
Sixteen-year-old son of the Davis family, Alex is a mathematics prodigy who struggles with vehicular issues. He becomes romantically involved with the 29-year-old Claire. He sold his brand new motorcycle to rent a house for him and his family right next door to Claire. He is played by Sam Murphy.

=== Claire Ling ===
Twenty-nine-year-old computer analyst who shares an attraction with the younger Alex Davis. She lives next door to Alex and the rest of the Davis family. Claire was unaware of Alex's true age at first, and thought he was an undergraduate taking time off from MIT. While still unsure of the relationship after discovering his real age, she finds herself still attracted to Alex. She is played by Samantha Leigh Quan.

=== Michelle Graybar ===
An opportunistic real estate agent whose business-as-usual attitude flies in the face of the pending disaster. She is played by Nora Dunn.

== DVD release and streaming options ==
As of 2019, this show can be purchased on Amazon via their Prime video streaming.
