= Saturday Night Live season 11 =

Saturday Night Live
- Season 11
- No. of episodes: 18

Release
- Original network: NBC
- Original release: November 9, 1985 – May 24, 1986

Season chronology
- ← Previous season 10 Next → season 12

The eleventh season of Saturday Night Live, an American sketch comedy series, originally aired in the United States on NBC between November 9, 1985, and May 24, 1986.

The season marked Lorne Michaels' return to SNL as showrunner after a five-year hiatus. Michaels hired new cast members, but instead of his usual approach of recruiting from comedy clubs and improv groups, he cast established names such as Randy Quaid, Anthony Michael Hall, Robert Downey Jr., and Joan Cusack. Due to their relative inexperience in comedy, the new cast failed to connect with audiences.

The show also featured a frustrated writing crew (including future Simpsons writers Jon Vitti, George Meyer and John Swartzwelder), who did not know how to write sketches for such an eclectic cast. The season was plagued by harsh criticism, low ratings, and rumors of a possible cancellation. NBC president Brandon Tartikoff planned to cancel SNL after its season finale in May 1986; Michaels, however, pleaded with Tartikoff to let the show go on. Most of the cast was let go for the following season, with only Nora Dunn, Jon Lovitz and Dennis Miller along with featured player A. Whitney Brown returning, making it one of the more notable cast overhauls alongside season 6 and season 20.

The season was the subject of the fourth episode of the Peacock docuseries SNL50: Beyond Saturday Night entitled "Season 11: The Weird Year".

== Cast ==
With Dick Ebersol's cast and writers gone, Michaels hired Academy Award nominee Quaid, best known for his work in The Last Detail and National Lampoon's Vacation; as well as Cusack and Downey Jr. Part of the reasoning that Michaels chose younger performers was due to SNL's original audience, which comprised baby boomers, now nearing middle age, meaning that producers and NBC executives needed to appeal to a younger audience.

Chicago-based performance artist Danitra Vance was added along with stand-up comedians Miller and Damon Wayans, and improv comedians Dunn and Lovitz. Terry Sweeney, a comedic performer who had made a name for himself playing Nancy Reagan in Off-Broadway revues and who had been a writer on season 6 of SNL, was added to the cast, making him the first openly gay actor on network television. Don Novello returned as a featured player sporadically throughout the season, often reprising his popular Father Guido Sarducci character. A. Whitney Brown was also added to the cast midway through the season, performing his "The Big Picture" segment on Weekend Update, and Al Franken returned in the finale. Miller became the new anchor for Weekend Update. Despite the season's negative reception, Lovitz would gain popularity with characters like the Pathological Liar and Master Thespian.

Chris Elliott, then a performer and writer on Late Night with David Letterman, auditioned for the cast this season and was offered the job. He turned it down in order to remain at Letterman, though he would later join the SNL cast for one season in 1994. According to a 2020 interview with short-term cast member Dan Vitale, actress Anjelica Huston was nearly hired as a cast member this season. Huston, a friend of Lorne's, was begged to join the show as a cast member; instead she co-hosted the season finale with Billy Martin. Jim Carrey auditioned to be in the cast this season but was declined.

=== Controversy ===
When Chevy Chase hosted the show, there were reports of tension amongst the cast and crew. According to the book Live from New York: The Uncensored History of Saturday Night Live, Chase pitched an idea for a sketch that featured openly gay cast member Sweeney as a person with AIDS who is weighed by a doctor to see how much weight he lost.

=== Cast roster ===
**Repertory players**

- Joan Cusack
- Robert Downey Jr.
- Nora Dunn
- Anthony Michael Hall
- Jon Lovitz
- **Dennis Miller**
- Randy Quaid
- Terry Sweeney
- Danitra Vance

**Featured players**

- A. Whitney Brown (first episode: March 15, 1986)
- Al Franken (only episode: May 24, 1986)
- Don Novello (first episode: November 23, 1985)
- Dan Vitale (only episodes: November 23, 1985, February 8, 1986)
- Damon Wayans (final episode: March 15, 1986)

bold denotes Weekend Update anchor

Wayans is credited as a featured player for all of the first twelve episodes, except for episode 10. He exits the show after episode 12 but returns as a guest to do standup for the season finale. The rest of the featured players are not credited in many episodes: Novello is only credited for five, Brown only appears in six (though uncredited for three appearances, mostly due to him not having been made a featured player yet), Vitale is only credited for two, and Franken is only credited for the season finale.

== Writers ==
This season's writers were A. Whitney Brown, Tom Davis, Jim Downey, Al Franken, Jack Handey, Lanier Laney, Carol Leifer, George Meyer, Lorne Michaels, Don Novello, Michael O'Donoghue, R. D. Rosen, Herb Sargent, Suzy Schneider, Robert Smigel, John Swartzwelder, Terry Sweeney, Mark McKinney and Bruce McCulloch. The head writer was Downey. Downey and Sargent were the only writers from the previous season to return to the show. Franken and Davis were also this season's co-producers.

== Special guests ==
Penn & Teller and Sam Kinison are featured in the opening credits as special guests for many episodes this season, performing a segment of their own acts each time they appear. Penn & Teller did six episodes, while Kinison did four. Each act appears as a special guest once more in the 1986–87 season before this type of variety show performance is discontinued and the focus of the show becomes the cast. Steven Wright, who had been a special guest to do standup on four episodes of the previous season, returns for one episode of this season.

== Episodes ==
No. overall	No. in season	Host(s)	Musical guest(s)	Original release date
196	1	Madonna	Simple Minds	November 9, 1985
Simple Minds perform "Alive and Kicking" and "Sanctify Yourself".; The episode's cold opening features Lorne Michaels and the head of NBC's entertainment division Brandon Tartikoff announcing the start of the show's second decade before immediately proceeding to issue urine tests to check the new cast members for drug use due to the show's past performers' well-publicized issues with drugs. The new cast's youngest member, 17-year-old Anthony Michael Hall then pledges to remain drug-free while employed by the network. Criticized for being in poor taste, the sketch has been cut from nearly all reruns with the exception of Canada's Comedy Channel. Instead, the reruns now start with the opening montage and a Simple Minds performance from dress rehearsal (“Sanctify Yourself”) fills time. Reruns also replace the opening sequence with the one that began later in the season.; First appearance of "Limits of the Imagination," a Twilight Zone spoof that recurs throughout the season.; Guest appearance by Penn & Teller.; Don Novello appears as Father Guido Sarducci during the pretaped wedding video segment in the monologue.; Joan Cusack, Robert Downey Jr., Nora Dunn, Anthony Michael Hall, Jon Lovitz, Dennis Miller, Randy Quaid, Terry Sweeney, Danitra Vance and Damon Wayans' first episode as cast members.; Credited Featured Player: Damon Wayans; Saturday Night News is retitled back to Weekend Update, the news segment's title during the first six seasons. Weekend Update is now hosted by Miller.; Michaels returns as executive producer.
197	2	Chevy Chase	Sheila E	November 16, 1985
Sheila E performs "Hollyrock" and "A Love Bizarre".; First appearance of Tommy Flanagan, The Pathological Liar; Credited Featured Player: Damon Wayans
198	3	Pee-wee Herman	Queen Ida & the Bon Temps Zydeco Band	November 23, 1985
Queen Ida & the Bon Temps Zydeco Band performs "La Louisiane" and "Frisco Zydeco".; Credited Featured Players: Don Novello, Dan Vitale, Damon Wayans; Former cast member Robin Duke appears in the "Pee-Wee Herman Thanksgiving Special" sketch as one of the audience members during the performance by Diana Ross (Terry Sweeney).; Don Novello rejoins the cast after a five-year hiatus.; Dan Vitale's first of two episodes as a featured player.; According to Vitale, the show considered George C. Scott as a possible host for this episode, before selecting Reubens.; Future cast member Phil Hartman was credited as a guest writer for this episode.; This marks the second time that a fictional character hosts an episode. The first being Novello as Father Guido Sarducci in 1984.
199	4	John Lithgow	Mr. Mister	December 7, 1985
Mr. Mister performs "Broken Wings" and "Kyrie".; Guest appearance by Sam Kinison.; Credited Featured Player: Damon Wayans
200	5	Tom Hanks	Sade	December 14, 1985
Sade performs "Is It a Crime" and "The Sweetest Taboo".; The Entertainment Tonight opening sketch references Spying Isn't Cool, a fake public service ad with Brooke Shields that was mentioned as a joke on Weekend Update in the previous episode. Joan Cusack plays Shields, claiming that her movie career stalled after her mother turned down offers for her to play roles with Al Pacino (Scarface) and Robert De Niro (Once Upon a Time in America).; Credited Featured Player: Damon Wayans; Guest appearance by Steven Wright.; First appearance of the limo ride through the city during the opening sequence, which will remain for the rest of this season.
201	6	Teri Garr	The Dream Academy; The Cult	December 21, 1985
The Dream Academy performs "Life in a Northern Town".; The Cult performs "She Sells Sanctuary".; Guest appearance by Penn & Teller.; Credited Featured Players: Don Novello (credited in the opening as his character name, "Maurice"), Damon Wayans
202	7	Harry Dean Stanton	The Replacements	January 18, 1986
The Replacements perform "Bastards of Young" and "Kiss Me on the Bus," both from the Tim album. The entire band was drunk during both their performances. As one reviewer succinctly observed, the band could quite often be "mouthing profanities into the camera, stumbling into each other, falling down, dropping their instruments, and generally behaving like the apathetic drunks they were." After this incident, they were banned permanently from SNL, although lead singer Paul Westerberg would return as a solo musical guest during the 19th season.; Credited Featured Player: Damon Wayans; Guest appearance by Sam Kinison.
203	8	Dudley Moore	Al Green	January 25, 1986
Al Green performs "Going Away" and "True Love".; Credited Featured Player: Damon Wayans; Most reruns of this episode cut the Miss Pregnant Teen USA sketch (which featured Danitra Vance as Cabrini Green Jackson, Dudley Moore as Roman Polanski, and Lauren Tom [who worked as an extra in this episode] as Miss Hawaii) and replace it with a sketch that got cut after dress rehearsal and a repeat of the "Big Ball of Sports" sketch from the Harry Dean Stanton episode.
204	9	Ron Reagan	The Nelsons	February 8, 1986
The Nelsons perform "Won't Walk Away" and "Do You Know What I Mean".; Credited Featured Players: Dan Vitale, Damon Wayans; Guest appearance by Penn & Teller.; Writer A. Whitney Brown appears on Weekend Update to do "The Big Picture", although he is not officially made a featured player until later in the season.; Dan Vitale's second of two episodes credited as a featured player.
205	10	Jerry Hall	Stevie Ray Vaughan; Double Trouble	February 15, 1986
Credited Featured Players: (none); Stevie Ray Vaughan & Double Trouble perform "Say What!" and "Change It". Jimmie Vaughan appears on "Change It".; Mick Jagger appears in this episode's cold opening where Tommy Flanagan (Jon Lovitz) hits on the host at a bar — told by Hall that Flanagan claims to know him, Jagger "confirms" this and remarks that the two had been on a fishing trip during a recent weekend where Hall did not know where he was, telling Flanagan "I owe you for this one."; Guest appearance by Sam Kinison.
206	11	Jay Leno	The Neville Brothers	February 22, 1986
Credited Featured Player: Damon Wayans; A. Whitney Brown performs "The Big Picture" on Weekend Update but is not credited as a featured player in the opening.; The Neville Brothers perform "The Big Chief" and "The Midnight Key".; The dog actor "Mike the Dog" is credited as a special guest in the opening.
207	12	Griffin Dunne	Rosanne Cash	March 15, 1986
Credited Featured Players: A. Whitney Brown, Don Novello, Damon Wayans; Rosanne Cash performs "Hold On" and "I Don't Know Why You Don't Want Me".; Guest appearance by Penn & Teller.; A. Whitney Brown's first episode as a featured player.; Damon Wayans' final episode as a cast member.; In the "Mr. Monopoly" sketch, Wayans plays a minor police officer character role as a gay stereotype (who sounds similar to his Blaine character from In Living Color's "Men on..." sketches). According to Wayans himself, an utterly furious Lorne Michaels chewed him out for his renegade move after the sketch finished and proceeded to fire him from the show. Despite this, Wayans came back to perform stand-up on the last episode of the season and would return to host during the 1994-1995 season.
208	13	George Wendt; Francis Ford Coppola	Philip Glass	March 22, 1986
Credited Featured Players: (none); The Philip Glass Ensemble performs "Rubric" from Glassworks and "Lightning" from Songs from Liquid Days.; The show's opening theme song was replaced by "Façades," also from Glassworks.; Francis Ford Coppola appears in between sketches in a running gag throughout the episode where he, Lorne Michaels, and Terry Sweeney try to improve SNL on the air to boost the show's sagging ratings.
209	14	Oprah Winfrey	Joe Jackson	April 12, 1986
Credited Featured Players: A. Whitney Brown, Don Novello; Joe Jackson performs "Right and Wrong" and "Soul Kiss".
210	15	Tony Danza	Laurie Anderson	April 19, 1986
Credited Featured Players: (none); Laurie Anderson performs "Baby Doll" and "The Day the Devil".; Guest appearance by Penn & Teller.
211	16	Catherine Oxenberg; Paul Simon	Paul Simon; Ladysmith Black Mambazo	May 10, 1986
Credited Featured Players: (none); Paul Simon performs "Homeless," "Graceland" and "You Can Call Me Al"; Simon performed the latter song to start the show in lieu of an opening sketch, and would be the one to deliver the "Live from New York, It's Saturday Night!" line afterwards. Ladysmith Black Mambazo play on "Homeless".; Guest appearance by Penn & Teller.; A. Whitney Brown performs "The Big Picture" on Weekend Update but is not credited as a featured player in the opening.
212	17	Jimmy Breslin	Level 42; E.G. Daily	May 17, 1986
Credited Featured Players: (none); Level 42 performs "Something About You".; E. G. Daily performs "Say It, Say It".; Guest appearance by Sam Kinison and Marvelous Marvin Hagler.
213	18	Anjelica Huston; Billy Martin	George Clinton; Parliament-Funkadelic	May 24, 1986
Credited Featured Players: A. Whitney Brown, Al Franken and Don Novello (credited under the name of his character Father Guido Sarducci).; George Clinton and Parliament-Funkadelic perform "Let's Take It to the Stage" and "Do Fries Go with That Shake?".; Damon Wayans returns to perform stand-up.; Al Franken rejoins the cast after a six-year hiatus. This is also his only appearance as a cast member until season 14.; Joan Cusack, Robert Downey Jr., Anthony Michael Hall, Novello, Randy Quaid, Terry Sweeney and Danitra Vance's final episode as cast members.; All the cast members (except Lovitz, who Lorne Michaels purports was because he was the only cast member worth saving) were shown to be trapped in a room on fire as a parody of TV show cliffhangers; this is preceded by the last sketch of the night being interrupted by an "intoxicated" Martin being kicked off and starting the fire in retaliation. During the end credits, all of the names are punctuated with question marks, in parody of the uncertainty of the future of the series.
