= Saturday Night Live season 12 =

Saturday Night Live
- Season 12
- No. of episodes: 20

Release
- Original network: NBC
- Original release: October 11, 1986 – May 23, 1987

Season chronology
- ← Previous season 11 Next → season 13

The twelfth season of Saturday Night Live, an American sketch comedy series, originally aired in the United States on NBC between October 11, 1986, and May 23, 1987.

== History ==
When the 1986–1987 season began, only Jon Lovitz, Nora Dunn, Dennis Miller and featured player A. Whitney Brown returned as cast members. Michaels went back to his original tactic of assembling a strong ensemble of relative unknowns, led by Dana Carvey, Phil Hartman, Jan Hooks, Victoria Jackson and Kevin Nealon.

Jim Carrey made his third unsuccessful attempt to join the cast.

The first show of the 1986–1987 season opened with Madonna, host of the previous season opener, telling the audience that the entire 1985–1986 season had been a "horrible, horrible dream". Carvey's Church Lady character debuted in this episode.

Hartman's send-up of President Ronald Reagan kickstarted a period of political parody on SNL. Carvey's widely remembered impression of then Vice President George H. W. Bush debuted in the following season.

Other popular sketches introduced this season include Mr. Subliminal, the Sweeney Sisters, and Derek Stevens.

== Cast ==
The returning cast members were A. Whitney Brown, Nora Dunn, Jon Lovitz and Dennis Miller. Al Franken continued to write on the show, dropping his featured player status that he held for one episode of the previous season. In rebuilding the cast, Lorne Michaels returned to his usual practice of hiring unknown performers from stand-up and improv comedy backgrounds. The new cast members were Dana Carvey, Phil Hartman, Jan Hooks, Victoria Jackson and Kevin Nealon.

=== Cast roster ===
**Repertory players**

- Dana Carvey
- Nora Dunn
- Phil Hartman
- Jan Hooks
- Victoria Jackson
- Jon Lovitz
- **Dennis Miller**

**Featured players**

- A. Whitney Brown
- Kevin Nealon

bold denotes Weekend Update anchor

Unlike featured players in most other 80s/90s seasons, Brown and Nealon are credited in the opening montage for every single episode this season.

== Writers ==
This season's writers were Andy Breckman, A. Whitney Brown, E. Jean Carroll, Tom Davis, Jim Downey, Al Franken, Phil Hartman, George Meyer, Lorne Michaels, Kevin Nealon, Herb Sargent, Marc Shaiman, Rosie Shuster, Robert Smigel, Bonnie Turner, Terry Turner, Jon Vitti and Christine Zander. Downey also served as head writer.

== Episodes ==
No. overall	No. in season	Host(s)	Musical guest	Original release date
214	1	Sigourney Weaver	None	October 11, 1986
Madonna, who hosted the prior season's premiere, appeared in the cold opening to read a statement from NBC about the 1985–86 season: "It was all a dream—a horrible, horrible dream," in a parody of the Dallas episode "Blast from the Past", in which it was revealed that the entirety of the ninth season was Pamela Ewing's dream.; Buster Poindexter and the playwright Christopher Durang appear as special guests as acknowledgement of the "Saturday Night Live Band" is made in the opening for the first time. Poindexter performed "Oh Me, Oh My (I'm a Fool for You Baby)", "Baby, It's Cold Outside" (as a duet with Weaver), and "Smack Dab in the Middle" (accompanied by Soozie Tyrell).; First appearance of The Church Lady.; Dana Carvey (as Derek Stevens) sings "Chopping Broccoli".; Dana Carvey, Phil Hartman, Jan Hooks, Victoria Jackson and Kevin Nealon's first episode as cast members.
215	2	Malcolm-Jamal Warner	Run-DMC	October 18, 1986
Run-DMC performs "Walk This Way" and "Hit It, Run".; Guest appearances are made by Sam Kinison, Buster Poindexter performs "Hit the Road Jack" and Spike Lee introduces Run-DMC as his Mars Blackmon character from She's Gotta Have It.; First appearance of The Sweeney Sisters.
216	3	Rosanna Arquette	Ric Ocasek	November 8, 1986
Ric Ocasek performs "Emotion in Motion" and "Keep on Laughin'".; The episode was actually recorded and scheduled to air two weeks prior on October 25 but was delayed due to NBC's broadcast of the legendary sixth game of the 1986 World Series between the New York Mets and Boston Red Sox going into one extra inning (the series was eventually won by the Mets the following night); the aired version began with a taped segment in which Mets pitcher Ron Darling playfully apologized for the cancellation.; Ocasek appears as himself in Church Chat.
217	4	Sam Kinison	Lou Reed	November 15, 1986
Lou Reed performs "I Love You, Suzanne" from 1984's New Sensations and "The Original Wrapper" from 1986's Mistrial.; Guest appearance by porn star Seka.; A guest appearance by Buster Poindexter is mentioned in the intro alongside the first acknowledgement of G.E. Smith being the lead of the house band; Kinison apologizes that he was cut for time in the goodnights.
218	5	Robin Williams	Paul Simon	November 22, 1986
Paul Simon performs "Diamonds on the Soles of Her Shoes", "The Boy in the Bubble" and "The Late Great Johnny Ace". The first song featured Ladysmith Black Mambazo, making their second appearance on the show, while "The Late Great Johnny Ace" opened with a still shot of John F. Kennedy, marking the 23rd anniversary of his assassination (which is referenced in the song.) Simon also appears in the "Ticket Line", "Hamlet" and "Baycrest Jewish Retirement Home" sketches.; Art Garfunkel appears in the "Ticket Line" sketch with Paul Simon.; Whoopi Goldberg makes a cameo appearance, introducing Simon's second song.
219	6	Chevy Chase; Steve Martin; Martin Short	Randy Newman	December 6, 1986
Randy Newman performs "Longest Night" and "Roll with the Punches".; Chevy Chase acknowledges his recent stint in the Betty Ford Center in the monologue and cold opening, a sketch where klutzy people hold a support group meeting called Stumblebums Anonymous.; In a sketch written by Jim Downey and Al Franken, Phil Hartman portrays President Ronald Reagan as Mastermind, a "sweet, befuddled old man in public, who in private becomes the hard-charging director of the covert operation to finance the Nicaraguan Contras".; Guest appearance by Eric Idle.
220	7	Steve Guttenberg	The Pretenders	December 13, 1986
The Pretenders perform "Don't Get Me Wrong" and "How Much Did You Get for Your Soul?".; Guest appearances by Penn & Teller and Buster Poindexter. Poindexter and Pretenders lead singer Chrissie Hynde performed "Rockin' Good Way".; Tim Robbins appears in a short film, "Profiles: Bob Roberts". His directorial debut, Bob Roberts was based on this segment.
221	8	William Shatner	Lone Justice	December 20, 1986
Lone Justice performs "Shelter" and "I Found Love".; This episode features the infamous sketch where William Shatner, sick of Star Trek fans asking him inane questions, tells them to "Get a life!"; Comedian Kevin Meaney makes a guest appearance.; Special guest Buster Poindexter played "Zat You, Santa?".
222	9	Joe Montana; Walter Payton	Deborah Harry	January 24, 1987
Deborah Harry performs "French Kissin" and "In Love with Love".; Buster Poindexter performs "Scotch and Soda".
223	10	Paul Shaffer	Bruce Hornsby & the Range	January 31, 1987
Bruce Hornsby & the Range perform "The Way It Is" and "Mandolin Rain".
224	11	Bronson Pinchot	Paul Young	February 14, 1987
Paul Young performs "War Games" and "The Long Run".; Guest appearances by Paulina Porizkova and Buster Poindexter, who performs "Heart of Gold".
225	12	Willie Nelson	Willie Nelson	February 21, 1987
Danny DeVito makes a guest appearance.; Willie Nelson performs "Blue Eyes" and "Partners After All".; In a sketch, Nelson accompanies Victoria Jackson on "The Boyfriend Song".
226	13	Valerie Bertinelli	Robert Cray Band	February 28, 1987
Robert Cray Band performs "Smoking Gun" and "Right Next Door".; Bertinelli's then-husband, Eddie Van Halen, appeared in a sketch and played with the SNL Band. Van Halen performed "Stompin' 8H".; Guest appearance by Edwin Newman.
227	14	Bill Murray	Percy Sledge	March 21, 1987
Percy Sledge performs "When a Man Loves a Woman".; The cold opening for the episode (where Lorne Michaels meets Bill Murray backstage and discusses his contract with him) has been either edited in reruns (as seen on Comedy Central and E!) or replaced with the cold opening from the Bronson Pinchot episode where Liberace (Phil Hartman) is playing the piano in Heaven and tells the audience that the censors won't let him do anything else besides that (as seen with the streaming version formerly shown on Netflix and now shown on NBC's Peacock).
228	15	Charlton Heston	Wynton Marsalis	March 28, 1987
Wynton Marsalis performs "J Mood" and "Juan (E. Mustaad)".; The episode features a short film by future cast member Ben Stiller.
229	16	John Lithgow	Anita Baker	April 11, 1987
Anita Baker performs "Sweet Love" and "Same Ole Love (365 Days a Year)".
230	17	John Larroquette	Timbuk 3	April 18, 1987
Timbuk 3 performs "Just Another Movie" and "Hairstyles & Attitudes".
231	18	Mark Harmon	Suzanne Vega	May 9, 1987
Suzanne Vega performs "Luka" and "Marlene on the Wall".
232	19	Garry Shandling	Los Lobos	May 16, 1987
Los Lobos performs "Is That All There Is" and "One Time, One Night".; Tracey Ullman appeared in the filmed Hollywood Mom sketch.; Nell Campbell appeared in Tenny Café.; A number of sketches had Shandling breaking the fourth wall, referring to the style of the then-airing It's Garry Shandling's Show.
233	20	Dennis Hopper	Roy Orbison	May 23, 1987
Roy Orbison performs "Crying", "Oh, Pretty Woman" and "In Dreams".
