= Saturday Night Live season 16 =

Saturday Night Live
- Season 16
- No. of episodes: 20

Release
- Original network: NBC
- Original release: September 29, 1990 – May 18, 1991

Season chronology
- ← Previous season 15 Next → season 17

The sixteenth season of Saturday Night Live, an American sketch comedy series, originally aired in the United States on NBC between September 29, 1990, and May 18, 1991.

== Cast ==
Extensive changes occurred before the start of the season. Nora Dunn and Jon Lovitz were both dropped from the show. Following her boycott of the episode hosted by Andrew Dice Clay the previous season, Dunn left the cast.

Before the season began, Lovitz requested time off so he could film Mom and Dad Save the World, which would cause him to miss the first several episodes of the season. Michaels refused, because he did not view this to be fair to the other cast members. Lovitz subsequently quit. However, he would make several cameo appearances throughout this season.

With Dunn and Lovitz gone, Michaels was put in an unusual situation. Most of the cast had been on the show for five seasons. He did not want to be put in the spot of having to replace the entire cast all at once (and to avoid repeating Jean Doumanian's mistake—and his previous mistake in the case of the season 11 cast—of hiring a cast of new, inexperienced cast members with little to no comedic chemistry). Instead, he promoted writers Rob Schneider and David Spade to the cast and hired Chris Farley, Chris Rock and Julia Sweeney. He later hired Tim Meadows and Adam Sandler to the cast midseason.

Starting with this season, the cast was divided into three groups. A middle group was created, and this new category would be introduced with the word "with," following the introduction of the repertory players. The first cast members added to the new group were Farley and Rock, with Meadows and Sweeney added midseason.

This season would also be the final season for Dennis Miller, Jan Hooks and A. Whitney Brown. Hooks left at the end of the season to join the show Designing Women, and Brown left the show midseason to move on to other acting opportunities. Miller, who also departed at the end of the season, was at the time the longest running anchor of Weekend Update, having done the job for six full seasons, until Seth Meyers broke the record in season 38. However, Miller still holds the record as the longest solo anchor of Weekend Update as Meyers was paired with Amy Poehler in his first three seasons on Weekend Update and Cecily Strong in his final season on the show.

Additionally, at the time of his departure, Miller was (briefly) the show's longest-tenured cast member (in the show's history), as he was the first cast member to stay on the show, for more than five seasons. However, several of his (former) castmates would pass that record over the next few years

Phil Hartman was also planning on leaving the show, but NBC convinced Hartman to stay on for a few more seasons by promising him his own comedy show, which was later scrapped. Hartman's third wife, Brynn, appears in this season's opening credits montage as the woman whom Hartman is speaking with in a restaurant booth.

=== Cast roster ===
**Repertory players**

- Dana Carvey
- Phil Hartman
- Jan Hooks
- Victoria Jackson
- **Dennis Miller**
- Mike Myers
- Kevin Nealon

**Middle players**

- Chris Farley
- Tim Meadows (first episode: February 9, 1991)
- Chris Rock
- Julia Sweeney (first episode: November 10, 1990)

**Featured players**

- A. Whitney Brown (final episode: March 16, 1991)
- Al Franken
- Adam Sandler (first episode: February 9, 1991)
- Rob Schneider (first episode: October 27, 1990)
- David Spade (first episode: November 10, 1990)

bold denotes Weekend Update anchor

All performers in the "Middle Players" category were credited for every episode after they were introduced, whereas featured players were only credited in episodes in which they appear. Of the featured players, Rob Schneider is credited for 14 episodes, David Spade and Al Franken for eight episodes each, Adam Sandler for seven episodes, and A. Whitney Brown for five episodes.

== Writers ==
Notable writers from season 16 included Jim Downey, Al Franken, Tom Davis, Jack Handey, Conan O'Brien, Adam Sandler (who was a new writer), Rob Smigel and Bob Odenkirk.

Season 16 would be the final year for O'Brien and Odenkirk as Saturday Night Live writers. O'Brien (who previously joined the writing staff in 1988) left to write for The Simpsons, and would later host NBC's Late Night and Tonight Show late night talk shows. Odenkirk (who wrote on the show for four years, starting in 1987) would go on to write for future cast member Chris Elliott's Get a Life and The Dennis Miller Show as well as The Ben Stiller Show, for which he was also a cast member. In 1995, he would co-create and co-star on HBO's Mr. Show with Bob and David.

This was also the final season for longtime writer A. Whitney Brown (who had been a writer since 1985), as he left the writing staff after six years.

== Episodes ==
No. overall	No. in season	Host	Musical guest	Original release date
287	1	Kyle MacLachlan	Sinéad O'Connor	September 29, 1990
Credited Featured Players: Al Franken; Sinéad O'Connor performs "Three Babies" and "The Last Day of Our Acquaintance".; Bad Idea Jeans TV advertisement parody with uncredited appearances by Bob Odenkirk and David Spade.; Writer Conan O'Brien appears in the Twin Peaks sketch as Andy Brennan.; Chris Farley and Chris Rock's first episode as cast members.; Wally Feresten's first episode as cue card handler.
288	2	Susan Lucci	Hothouse Flowers	October 6, 1990
Credited Featured Players: (none); Hothouse Flowers performs "Give It Up" and "I Can See Clearly Now".; Gene Rayburn makes a cameo appearance in the "Game Breakers" sketch, along with Don Pardo.; Future cast member David Spade appears in the "Game Breakers" sketch.
289	3	George Steinbrenner	Morris Day & The Time	October 20, 1990
Credited Featured Players: Al Franken; The Time performs "Jerk Out" and "Chocolate".
290	4	Patrick Swayze	Mariah Carey	October 27, 1990
Credited Featured Players: A. Whitney Brown, Al Franken, Rob Schneider; Mariah Carey performs "Vision of Love" and "Vanishing".; Swayze's wife, Lisa Niemi, appears during the monologue and dances with her husband.; Episode contains the "Chippendales" sketch, where Patrick Swayze and Chris Farley play dancers competing to be cast for the male burlesque troupe Chippendales.; Rob Schneider's first episode as a cast member.
291	5	Jimmy Smits	World Party	November 10, 1990
Credited Featured Players: Rob Schneider, David Spade; World Party performs "Way Down Now" and "Ship of Fools".; Bob Costas makes a cameo appearance in the "Spanish Pronunciation" sketch.; Contains the first "Simon" (Mike Myers) and "The Dark Side with Nat X" (Chris Rock) sketches.; David Spade and Julia Sweeney's first episode as cast members.
292	6	Dennis Hopper	Paul Simon	November 17, 1990
Credited Featured Players: Rob Schneider; Paul Simon performs "The Obvious Child" with Olodum, "Late in the Evening" and "Proof". He also appears in the "Bowman's Retirement Party" sketch.; Miss America pageant host Bert Parks makes a cameo appearance during the monologue and in the following "All New This Is Your Life" sketch.
293	7	John Goodman	Faith No More	December 1, 1990
Credited Featured Players: Rob Schneider, David Spade; Faith No More performs "Epic" and "From Out of Nowhere".; Contains the first "Pat" sketch (Julia Sweeney)
294	8	Tom Hanks	Edie Brickell & New Bohemians	December 8, 1990
Credited Featured Players: A. Whitney Brown; Edie Brickell & New Bohemians performs "Woyaho" and "He Said".; Elliott Gould, Steve Martin and Paul Simon make cameo appearances as members of the "Five Timer's Club"; Jon Lovitz cameos as a waiter, Conan O'Brien as a doorman and Ralph Nader appears as a onetime former host trying to get into the club. Ralph Nader also appears in the "Global Warming Christmas Special" sketch.; Tony Randall makes a cameo appearance in the "Game Beaters/Mr. Short Term Memory" sketch.; Future cast member Adam Sandler appears in the Sabra sketch.; Aired on the 10th anniversary of the death of John Lennon. An excerpt of Lennon’s “Instant Karma!” is played at the beginning and end of Weekend Update .
295	9	Dennis Quaid	The Neville Brothers	December 15, 1990
Credited Featured Players: Rob Schneider; The Neville Brothers performs "Brother Jake" and "River of Life."; Jon Lovitz makes a cameo appearance during "Weekend Update" as his character "Annoying Man".; Future cast member Adam Sandler appears in the Ex-Boyfriend sketch, which was submitted by an uncredited Judd Apatow.
296	10	Joe Mantegna	Vanilla Ice	January 12, 1991
Credited Featured Players: A. Whitney Brown, Rob Schneider; Vanilla Ice performs "Ice Ice Baby" and "Play That Funky Music".; Future cast member Adam Sandler portrays Hector Camacho in the O'Hanlon Memorial sketch.; Debut of "I'm Chillin'" (Chris Rock and Chris Farley) and "Bill Swerski's Superfans" sketches.
297	11	Sting	Sting	January 19, 1991
Credited Featured Players: Al Franken, Rob Schneider, David Spade; Sting performs "All This Time", "Mad About You" and "Purple Haze".; Contains the first "Richmeister" sketch (Rob Schneider), the debut of "Deep Thoughts by Jack Handey", the first "Coffee Talk" sketch (Mike Myers) as well as the "Sinatra Group" sketch.
298	12	Kevin Bacon	INXS	February 9, 1991
Credited Featured Players: A Whitney Brown, Al Franken, Adam Sandler, Rob Schneider; INXS performs "Bitter Tears" and "Suicide Blonde".; Contains the first "Stuart Smalley" sketch (Al Franken).; Tim Meadows and Adam Sandler's first episode as cast members.
299	13	Roseanne Barr	Deee-Lite	February 16, 1991
Credited Featured Players: Adam Sandler, Rob Schneider; Deee-Lite performs "World Clique" and "Power of Love" with backing by Bootsy Collins & The Rubber Band.; Tom Arnold makes a cameo appearance in the Sally sketch.; Jon Lovitz makes a cameo appearance in the Misery II sketch.
300	14	Alec Baldwin	Whitney Houston	February 23, 1991
Credited Featured Players: David Spade; Whitney Houston performs "I'm Your Baby Tonight", "All the Man That I Need" and "My Name Is Not Susan". Houston also appears during the monologue.; Jon Lovitz and journalist Arthur Kent appear during the monologue.; Boxer Evander Holyfield appears in the pre-recorded "The Dancer" sketch.
301	15	Michael J. Fox	The Black Crowes	March 16, 1991
Credited Featured Players: A Whitney Brown, Al Franken, Adam Sandler, Rob Schneider, Spade; The Black Crowes perform "Thick n' Thin" and "She Talks To Angels".; A. Whitney Brown's final episode as a cast member.
302	16	Jeremy Irons	Fishbone	March 23, 1991
Credited Featured Players: Adam Sandler, Rob Schneider; Fishbone performs "Sunless Saturday" and "Everyday Sunshine".; Boxer Donovan "Razor" Ruddock appears during "Weekend Update" and the "Buzz Pen" sketch.
303	17	Catherine O'Hara	R.E.M.	April 13, 1991
Credited Featured Players: Al Franken, Adam Sandler, Rob Schneider, David Spade; R.E.M. performs "Losing My Religion" and "Shiny Happy People". Kate Pierson of The B-52's performs with R.E.M. on the latter number.; Carole King plays with the Saturday Night Live Band.; Boxer Evander Holyfield appears in a replay of "The Dancer" sketch.; Bob Odenkirk appears during the monologue as an audience member.; Randy Quaid makes a cameo appearance in the "In Conclusion Theatre" sketch.
304	18	Steven Seagal	Michael Bolton	April 20, 1991
Credited Featured Players: Adam Sandler, Rob Schneider, David Spade; Michael Bolton performs "Love Is a Wonderful Thing" and "Time, Love and Tenderness". He also appears in the "Musicians for Free-Range Chickens" sketch.
305	19	Delta Burke	Chris Isaak	May 11, 1991
Credited Featured Players: Al Franken, Adam Sandler; Chris Isaak performs "Wicked Game" and "Diddley Daddy". He also appears in the "Karaoke Bar" sketch.; Madonna appears in a filmed cameo during the "Wayne's World" sketch.; An edited version of this episode was released as part of the three-episode "Best of Saturday Night Live: Special Edition" VHS (1992).
306	20	George Wendt	Elvis Costello	May 18, 1991
Credited Featured Players: Rob Schneider, David Spade; Elvis Costello performs "The Other Side of Summer" and "So Like Candy".; Jan Hooks and Dennis Miller's final episode as cast members.; Miller's final episode as Weekend Update anchor.

== Sources ==
- Cader, Michael; Baskin, Edie (1994). Saturday Night Live: The First Twenty Years. Houghton Mifflin Harcourt. ISBN 0-395-70895-8.
- Shales, Tom; Miller, James Andrew (2002). Live from New York: An Uncensored History of Saturday Night Live. Little, Brown. ISBN 978-0316781466.
