= Danitra Vance =

American comedian and actress (1954–1994)

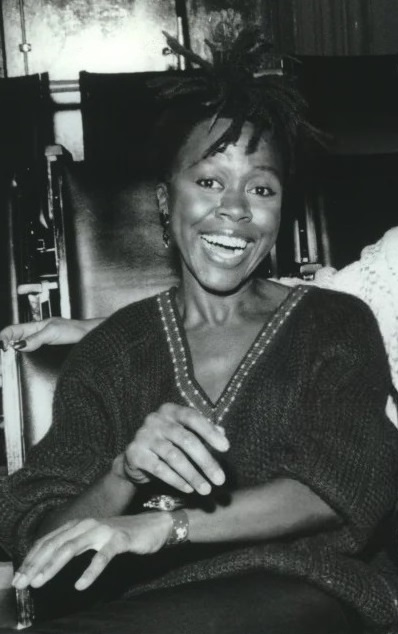
- Vance in 1987
- Born: July 13, 1954; Chicago, Illinois, U.S.
- Died: August 21, 1994 (aged 40); Markham, Illinois, U.S.
- Other name: Dan Vance
- Education: Roosevelt University; Webber Douglas Academy of Dramatic Art (MFA)
- Occupations: Comedian, actress
- Years active: 1972–1994
- Notable work: Saturday Night Live (season 11)
- Partner: Jones Miller
- Awards: Obie Award for Distinguished Performance by an Actress

Danitra Vance (July 13, 1954 – August 21, 1994) was an American comedian and actress who was a cast member on the NBC sketch comedy show Saturday Night Live (SNL) during its eleventh season in 1985.

Raised in Chicago's South Side, Vance performed for The Second City, was an "Off-Broadway favorite," and was the first Black woman of the primary SNL cast and, following Denny Dillon and along with Terry Sweeney, one of the first LGBT members, though she was not out to the public during her lifetime. Her comedy and theater work featured themes of social issues, including that of being consistently stereotyped during casting. Throughout her career, she received an Obie Award and an NAACP Image Award. She also appeared in feature films like Sticky Fingers, Limit Up, and Jumpin' at the Boneyard.

In 1990, Vance was diagnosed with breast cancer, and performed several works through remission and recurrence until her death in 1994. In the final years of her life, she requested that her family host her services at an amusement park.

== Early life and early career ==
Raised in the South Side, Chicago, Danitra Vance grew up with her mother, younger sister, and maternal grandparents in a household where telling stories was the main form of entertainment, and graduated from nearby Thornton Township High School in 1972. In high school she was active in theater and was a member of the debate team. She later attended National College of Education before transferring to Roosevelt University in 1975, where she studied playwriting and acting, and graduated with honors. She then moved to London to study at Webber Douglas Academy of Dramatic Art, where she was classically trained in Shakespeare and earned a MFA.

Vance started her career performing with The Second City improv group before moving to New York City in 1981 with goals of performing only to face direct discrimination and return to the Midwest to teach high school in Gary, Indiana, where her students helped inspire characters in her next show. She initially performed the characters in Old Town, Chicago.

From November 30 – December 11, 1984, Vance mounted the show, "Danitra Vance and the Mell-o White Boys," at La MaMa Experimental Theatre Club. In a review of the piece that ran in The Village Voice, theater critic Alisa Solomon wrote that Vance's comedy "stabs while it entertains, actually causing a physical catch in your laughter, as she undercuts every pose she takes... Beginning with and then undermining stereotypes, Vance creates an unsettling tension among stereotypes, reality, and the conditions that create stereotypes." Among the characters she performed in the show were several that she later developed on Saturday Night Live – including teenaged mother Cabrini Green Jackson and Flotilla Williams (who performs a version of Romeo and Juliet's balcony scene from her fire escape).

== Saturday Night Live ==
Vance was the first Black woman to become an SNL repertory player in 1985 (after Yvonne Hudson's tenure as a featured player previously); and the second lesbian cast member hired after Denny Dillon, though Vance's sexual orientation was not public knowledge until her death. Her casting alongside Terry Sweeney (the show's first openly gay male cast member) was also the first time that Saturday Night Live had two gay cast members.

Vance joined the SNL cast during a time of great transition and turbulence for the show, and she became frustrated over repeatedly having characters stereotypical of young Black women written for her. She was ultimately let go by SNL at the end of the 1986 season, along with many other cast members, including Sweeney, Joan Cusack, Robert Downey Jr., Randy Quaid, and Anthony Michael Hall.

=== Recurring characters on SNL ===
- That Black Girl, a Black actress looking to hit the big time, despite being passed up because of her race (a parody of Marlo Thomas's That Girl)
- Cabrini Green, "the Teen Supreme" Jackson, a professional teenage mother and motivational speaker who gives advice on teen pregnancy

==== Celebrity impersonations ====
- Diahann Carroll (as Dominique Deveraux on Dynasty)
- Lola Falana
- Cicely Tyson
- Leslie Uggams

== Late career ==
She was awarded an NAACP Image Award in 1986 and later won an Obie Award for Distinguished Performance by an Actress for her performance in the theatrical adaptation of Spunk, a collection of short stories written by Zora Neale Hurston. That same year, Vance was also in the original cast of George C. Wolfe's The Colored Museum; she would go on to reprise some of her performances therein for a 1991 Great Performances restaging of the play.

Vance was the second female lead, opposite Nancy Allen, in Limit Up, in which she played Nike, a guardian angel on assignment for God (played by Ray Charles). She had small roles in The War of the Roses and Little Man Tate and a more significant role in Jumpin' at the Boneyard, for which she was nominated for an Independent Spirit Award for Best Supporting Female at the 8th Independent Spirit Awards.

== Death ==
Diagnosed with breast cancer in 1990, Vance underwent a single mastectomy and incorporated the experience into a solo skit, "The Radical Girl's Guide to Radical Mastectomy". She expanded on her experiences in a second autobiographical show, titled Pre-Shrunk, which was to be performed at The Public Theater. However, she was unable to perform as her cancer recurred in 1993. She died of the disease the following year in Markham, Illinois, with her age incorrectly cited as 35. She had shaved five years off. She requested her funeral be held at an amusement park, and her family threw her a "going-away party" with apple bobbing and bean bag tossing to respect her wishes. She was survived by her partner, Jones Miller.

== Filmography ==
=== Film ===
Year	Film	Role	Notes
1988	Sticky Fingers	Evanston	
1989	Limit Up	Nike	
1989	The War of the Roses	Manicurist Trainee	
1991	Hangin' with the Homeboys	Pool Hall Woman	
1991	Little Man Tate	Clinic Doctor	
1992	Jumpin' at the Boneyard	Jeanette	

=== Television ===
Year	Film	Role	Notes
1985–1986	Saturday Night Live	Various	Main cast (18 episodes)
1987	Miami Vice	Annette McAllister	Episode: "Child's Play"
1989	The Cover Girl and the Cop	Jan	Television movie
1989	Trying Times	Emma St. John	Episode: "Hunger Chic"
1990	Sisters	Brenda	Television movie
1991	Great Performances	Miss Pat/The Woman/Normal Jean Reynolds	Episode: "The Colored Museum"
