= Terry Sweeney =

American actor

- Born: New York City, U.S.
- Education: Middlebury College (BA)
- Occupations: Comedian; actor; writer
- Spouse: Lanier Laney
- Website: lanierlaneyandterrysweeney.com

Terry Sweeney is an American comedian, actor, writer, and artist. He was a writer and cast member of Saturday Night Live in the 1980s, co-wrote the 1989 film Shag, and has written for the television series MADtv, Hype, and Tripping the Rift.

== Early life ==
Terry Sweeney was born in Queens, New York and raised in Massapequa Park, New York as the younger of two children to Terrence, a butcher, and Lenore Sweeney. As a child, he was bullied and found solace in books and movie musicals as well as in performing his own plays. At a young age, his interest in the performing arts grew and he became a star of the high school talent show. He graduated Farmingdale High School in 1969 and attended Middlebury College, where he continued his studies in Spanish and Italian, and graduated in 1973 with a Bachelor of Arts degree.

== Saturday Night Live ==
Sweeney was working as a waiter when he learned that the hit late-night comedy sketch show Saturday Night Live (SNL) was hiring writers. Sweeney wrote a variety of sketches to audition and took them to 30 Rock. He posed as a delivery driver to meet with then-SNL producer Jean Doumanian. After revealing to her that he was actually a writer, Sweeney left his work and the lunch with Doumanian. She called him two weeks later to hire him as a sketch writer.

While still sketch-writing, Sweeney started doing performance art as various drag characters at New York City venues. A rave New York Times review of "Banned in France" led to an audition at SNL for the series producer Lorne Michaels. He became a regular cast member of the program's 1985–86 season, alongside such actors as Randy Quaid, Robert Downey Jr., Joan Cusack, and Anthony Michael Hall.

Sweeney was not only SNL's first openly gay male cast member, but also the first on any network commercial-based television. Sweeney had chosen to inform NBC about his sexuality and refused to sign the morality clause, believing it was important to be open during the AIDS epidemic. Despite fearing he would be fired, Sweeney was met with support by Michaels and remained in the cast. Sweeney also appeared in this season alongside Danitra Vance, who was a lesbian, becoming the first time SNL had two LGBTQ+ members (although Vance's sexuality was not known until her death in 1994).

While at SNL, the roles Sweeney was given were almost exclusively gay stereotypes and exaggerated female impersonations. He became known for his celebrity impersonations, particularly his female impersonations of stars such as Diana Ross, Patti LaBelle, Joan Collins, Brooke Shields's mother Teri Shields, and Joan Rivers, as well as Ted Kennedy (the only male celebrity he impersonated). His most notable recurring character was a portrayal of then-First Lady Nancy Reagan. Sweeney was on the cast for the one season when he and most of the cast were cut after the season received poor reviews for its casting of actors, instead of comedians.

While hosting the show, former cast member Chevy Chase engaged in so much homophobic taunting, Sweeney described him as a "monster". The incident was mentioned in Chase's 2026 documentary special, I'm Chevy Chase and You're Not, where Chase denied the incident ever occurred. Sweeney rejected offers to participate in the documentary, but he issued a statement after its airing, calling Chase an "ass".

== Post-SNL career ==
=== As a writer ===
Sweeney has written for the FOX TV series MADtv, The WB's short-lived sketch comedy series Hype (and co-created), and Sci Fi Channel's Tripping the Rift, among a few others, all with his partner, Lanier Laney. Sweeney's major film credit was as the co-screenwriter for the film Shag, which was released in 1989.

He is the author of two published books. The first, Nancy Reagan: It's Still My Turn (1990) which started as performance art piece at Highways in Santa Monica, and transferred to New York's the Actor's Playhouse Off Broadway. His second book, Irritable Bowels and the People Who Give You Them (2015), is a collection of comic essays about his life in Hollywood.

=== As a performer ===
Sweeney performed a stand-up routine for the special Coming Out Party in 2000, which centered on his rough childhood, exploring his sexuality, surviving the AIDS epidemic, conservative politics, and being gay on Saturday Night Live. He also focused on his post-SNL life, when he and Lanier Laney cared for Laney's mother, who had Alzheimer's disease and did not know her son was homosexual.

In 2018 he appeared in two episodes of FX's Emmy Award-winning The Assassination of Gianni Versace: American Crime Story as David Gallo.

=== Other credits ===
Sweeney and Laney are also graphic artists with two exhibits - one is in California and the other in New York.

== Personal life ==
Terry Sweeney met Lanier Laney at Chaps, a leather bar in New York in the early 1980s. The two soon began dating and married on their 30th anniversary. Laney is an artist and comedy writer who also wrote for SNL in the 1985–1986 season. Laney and Sweeney were also writing partners for Saturday Night Live during the 1985–1986 season, the film Shag, and the Syfy Channel cartoon Tripping the Rift.

As of 2025, the couple resides in New York.

== Filmography ==
As writer
| Year | Title | Notes |
|---|---|---|
| 1980-1986 | Saturday Night Live | 31 episodes |
| 1987 | Love at Stake | |
| 1988 | Shag | |
| 1997-2000 | Mad TV | 75 episodes |
| 2000-2001 | Hype | 5 episodes; creator |
| 2004-2007 | Tripping the Rift | 7 episodes |
| 2008 | Tripping the Rift: The Movie | |

As actor
| Year | Title | Role | Notes |
|---|---|---|---|
| 1981-1986 | Saturday Night Live | Various characters | 18 episodes |
| 1994 | Something Wilder | Chuck | Episode: "Gotta Dance" |
| 1995 | Seinfeld | Keith | Episode: "The Switch" |
| 1995 | Platypus Man | Alan | Episode: "Dying to Live" |
| 1995 | Magic Island | Funny Face | |
| 1996 | Family Matters | Snooty Ticket Agent | Episode: "Eau de Love" |
| 1999 | Pros & Cons | Decorator | |
| 2003 | Sabrina the Teenage Witch | Heart Curator | Episode: "Spellmanian Slip" |
| 2014 | Baby Daddy | Henry | Episode: "All Aboard the Love Train" |
| 2018 | American Crime Story | David Gallo | 2 episodes |
| 2019 | The Politician | Buddy Broidy | Episode: "The Assassination of Payton Hobart" |
| 2026 | American Horror Story | Warlock Weathersby | Episode: "Madison's Happy Ending" |
