= Saturday Night Live season 13 =

Season of television series

Saturday Night Live
- Season 13
- No. of episodes: 13

Release
- Original network: NBC
- Original release: October 17, 1987 – February 27, 1988

Season chronology
- ← Previous season 12 Next → season 14

The thirteenth season of Saturday Night Live, an American sketch comedy series, originally aired in the United States on NBC between October 17, 1987, and February 27, 1988. Although the changes to the cast and writers were minimal, the season was cut short due to the 1988 Writers Guild of America strike.

== Production ==
During a dress rehearsal for the season premiere, a fire broke out near Studio 8H and was planned to be postponed. However, episode host Steve Martin pushed the cast to carry on with the show, making the Steve Martin/Sting episode the only episode without a dress rehearsal.

On March 7, the Writers Guild of America went on strike. The strike continued until August, thus cutting the season short at 13 episodes. Gilda Radner had been scheduled to host the season finale in the spring.

== Cast ==
Although most seasons of the show featured cast changes, season 13 was a rare exception (along with season 4), as every cast member from season 12 had returned. The only role difference was that Kevin Nealon, who debuted in the previous season, was upgraded to repertory status for season 13. A. Whitney Brown, who was a featured player in the previous season, remained a featured player throughout the entirety of season 13.

=== Cast roster ===
**Repertory players**

- Dana Carvey
- Nora Dunn
- Phil Hartman
- Jan Hooks
- Victoria Jackson
- Jon Lovitz
- **Dennis Miller**
- Kevin Nealon

**Featured players**

- A. Whitney Brown

bold denotes Weekend Update anchor

Brown is credited in the opening montage for seven of this season's 13 episodes.

== Writers ==
New hires this season were Greg Daniels, Conan O'Brien and Bob Odenkirk.

The writers for this season included A. Whitney Brown, Tom Davis, Greg Daniels, Jim Downey, Al Franken, Jack Handey, Phil Hartman, George Meyer, Lorne Michaels, Conan O'Brien, Bob Odenkirk, Herb Sargent, David Borowitz, Rosie Shuster, Robert Smigel, Bonnie Turner, Terry Turner, and Christine Zander. The head writer, like the previous season, was Jim Downey.

== Episodes ==
No. overall	No. in season	Host	Musical guest(s)	Original release date
234	1	Steve Martin	Sting	October 17, 1987
Credited Featured Player: A. Whitney Brown; Sting performs "We'll Be Together" and "Little Wing". He also appeared in the "Operation: Tightwad" sketch as James Bond villain 'Goldsting', a parody of Goldfinger.; Presidential candidate Bruce Babbitt appeared in a Weekend Update film with Al Franken.; First appearance of the Hans and Franz series of sketches
235	2	Sean Penn	LL Cool J Michael Penn	October 24, 1987
Credited Featured Player: A. Whitney Brown; LL Cool J performed "Go Cut Creator Go". and appeared in the opener.; Michael Penn, older brother of host Sean, performed "This and That" with his band The Pull.
236	3	Dabney Coleman	The Cars	October 31, 1987
Credited Featured Player: (none); The Cars performed "Strap Me In" and "Double Trouble". Lead singer Ric Ocasek appears in the opener.; Guest appearance by Cassandra Peterson as Elvira in the opener and on Weekend Update.; A short film by Michael Lehmann titled "Ed's Secret Life (An Unauthorized Biography)", purportedly about Mister Ed, is shown, with guest appearances by Mick Fleetwood, Heather Locklear and William Schallert.
237	4	Robert Mitchum	Simply Red	November 14, 1987
Credited Featured Player: A. Whitney Brown; Simply Red performs "Suffer" and "The Right Thing".
238	5	Candice Bergen	Cher	November 21, 1987
Credited Featured Player: (none); Cher performs "We All Sleep Alone" and "I Found Someone".; Guest appearance by Paul Shaffer.
239	6	Danny DeVito	Bryan Ferry	December 5, 1987
Credited Featured Player: (none); Bryan Ferry performs "The Right Stuff" and "Kiss and Tell".; Bob Odenkirk's first credited episode as a writer.
240	7	Angie Dickinson	Buster Poindexter; David Gilmour	December 12, 1987
Credited Featured Player: A. Whitney Brown; Buster Poindexter performs "Hot Hot Hot".; David Gilmour performs "Ah, Robertson, It's You" and an instrumental guitar jam with the SNL house band called "Song For My Sara".
241	8	Paul Simon	Linda Ronstadt	December 19, 1987
Credited Featured Player: A. Whitney Brown; Linda Ronstadt performs "Under African Skies" with Paul Simon, and "Los Laureles, La Cigarra".; Namesake U.S. Senator Paul Simon, a presidential candidate at the time, makes a cameo in the monologue.; Dana Carvey appeared during Weekend Update as Dennis Miller for the first time.; First appearance of "Tonto, Tarzan and Frankenstein's Monster" sketch (Jon Lovitz, Kevin Nealon and Phil Hartman)
242	9	Robin Williams	James Taylor	January 23, 1988
Credited Featured Player: (none); James Taylor performs "That Lonesome Road", "Sweet Potato Pie" and "Never Die Young". ("Lonesome Road" was a song that Taylor had sung at the funeral of John Belushi in 1982. This episode aired the day before what would've been Belushi's 39th birthday.); First appearance of "Learning To Feel" Sketch (Nora Dunn).
243	10	Carl Weathers	Robbie Robertson	January 30, 1988
Credited Featured Player: A. Whitney Brown; Robbie Robertson performs "Somewhere Down the Crazy River" and "Testimony".; BoDeans and Maria McKee appeared in both performances.
244	11	Justine Bateman	Terence Trent D'Arby	February 13, 1988
Credited Featured Player: (none); D'Arby performs "Wishing Well" and "Under My Thumb".; Dan Aykroyd appeared as Bob Dole in the cold opening.; Conan O'Brien and Greg Daniels' first writing credits as staff members.
245	12	Tom Hanks	Randy Travis	February 20, 1988
Credited Featured Player: (none); Randy Travis performs "What'll You Do About Me" and "Forever and Ever, Amen".
246	13	Judge Reinhold	10,000 Maniacs	February 27, 1988
Credited Featured Player: A. Whitney Brown; 10,000 Maniacs performs "What's the Matter Here" and "Like the Weather".; Last episode of the season. The 1988 WGA strike brought a sudden conclusion to this season.

== Canceled episodes with booked guests ==
Airdate	Host	Musical Guest	Comments
May 14, 1988	Gilda Radner	U2	A planned episode with original cast member Gilda Radner as host was cancelled due to the 1988 Writers Guild of America Strike. Radner would never get another chance to host, due to her death in 1989. This episode would have marked the first time a female cast member came back to host, a milestone that wasn't reached until Julia Louis-Dreyfus hosted on May 13, 2006. U2 would perform on the show on December 9, 2000.

== Works cited ==
- Shales, Tom; Miller, James Andrew (2002). Live From New York: An Uncensored History of Saturday Night Live. Little, Brown. ISBN 978-0316781466.
