= Saturday Night Live season 15 =

Saturday Night Live
- Season 15
- No. of episodes: 20

Release
- Original network: NBC
- Original release: September 30, 1989 – May 19, 1990

Season chronology
- ← Previous season 14 Next → season 16

The fifteenth season of Saturday Night Live, an American sketch comedy series, originally aired in the United States on NBC between September 30, 1989 and May 19, 1990.

This season saw the first appearances of three frequent SNL hosts: John Goodman, who auditioned to be a cast member on SNL during the 1980–81 season and frequently appeared on SNL in the mid-1990s as Linda Tripp; Christopher Walken; and Alec Baldwin (who later surpassed Steve Martin as the most frequent SNL host).

A live special commemorating fifteen seasons of SNL was aired on September 24, 1989, before the start of the season.

== Cast ==
Very few changes were made before and during this season. Mike Myers was upgraded to repertory status mid-season.

The season would be the final for Jon Lovitz and Nora Dunn. Dunn, in protest of the Andrew Dice Clay-hosted episode due to the comedian's misogynistic content, decided to boycott the episode in the hopes that Lorne Michaels and other producers would rescind Clay's invite. However, in the days leading up to the episode, press reports announced that Dunn would not be returning for the next season, which Dunn saw as a preemptive move by the show in response to her boycott. After the incident, she left the show in earnest, with Michaels describing it as Dunn's choice. Lovitz had wanted to return for next season, but the filming of his movie Mom and Dad Save the World meant he would have to miss the first few episodes of season 16. Michaels gave Lovitz the ultimatum of filming the movie or remaining in the cast, with Lovitz choosing the film.

=== Cast roster ===
**Repertory players**

- Dana Carvey
- Nora Dunn
- Phil Hartman
- Jan Hooks
- Victoria Jackson
- Jon Lovitz
- **Dennis Miller**
- Mike Myers (upgraded to repertory status: February 17, 1990)
- Kevin Nealon

**Featured players**

- A. Whitney Brown
- Al Franken

bold denotes Weekend Update anchor

Mike Myers is credited as a featured player in the opening montage for all of the first 11 episodes before being bumped up to repertory status in the 13th episode. A. Whitney Brown and Al Franken are credited as featured players for six episodes each sporadically throughout the season.

== Episodes ==
No. overall	No. in season	Host	Musical guest(s)	Original release date
267	1	Bruce Willis	Neil Young	September 30, 1989
Credited Featured Players: A. Whitney Brown, Mike Myers; Neil Young performs "Rockin' in the Free World", "The Needle and the Damage Done" and "No More".
268	2	Rick Moranis	Rickie Lee Jones	October 7, 1989
Credited Featured Players: Mike Myers; Rickie Lee Jones performs "Satellites" and "Ghetto of My Mind".; Mr Subliminal debuts on Weekend Update.
269	3	Kathleen Turner	Billy Joel	October 21, 1989
Credited Featured Players: A. Whitney Brown, Al Franken, Mike Myers; Billy Joel performs "We Didn't Start the Fire" and "The Downeaster Alexa". He also appears in the "Die Squaren öst Berliner" sketch, where he plays the glockenspiel.; Guest appearance by show writer Conan O'Brien
270	4	James Woods	Don Henley	October 28, 1989
Credited Featured Players: A. Whitney Brown, Mike Myers; Don Henley performs "The Last Worthless Evening" and "The Boys of Summer".; Dana Carvey appears as Dennis Miller on Weekend Update.
271	5	Chris Evert	Eurythmics	November 11, 1989
Credited Featured Players: Mike Myers; Eurythmics perform "Angel" and "(My My) Baby's Gonna Cry".
272	6	Woody Harrelson	David Byrne	November 18, 1989
Credited Featured Players: Mike Myers; David Byrne performs "Dirty Old Town" and "Loco de Amor".
273	7	John Goodman	k.d. lang	December 2, 1989
Credited Featured Players: Mike Myers; k.d. lang & The Reclines perform "Pullin' Back the Reins" and "Johnny Get Angry".
274	8	Robert Wagner	Linda Ronstadt & Aaron Neville	December 9, 1989
Credited Featured Players: Al Franken, Mike Myers; Linda Ronstadt and Aaron Neville perform "Don't Know Much" and "When Something Is Wrong with My Baby".
275	9	Andie MacDowell	Tracy Chapman	December 16, 1989
Credited Featured Players: Al Franken, Mike Myers; Tracy Chapman performs "Give Me One Reason", which wouldn't be released until 1995, and "All That You Have".; Al Franken's son Joe appears during Weekend Update in a take-off of Franken's "Al Franken Decade" bit, in which the 1990s are referred to as the "Joe Franken Decade".; Jon Lovitz portrays Hanukkah Harry.
276	10	Ed O'Neill	Harry Connick, Jr.	January 13, 1990
Credited Featured Players: Al Franken, Mike Myers; Harry Connick, Jr. performs "It Had to Be You" and "It's All Right with Me".; Maury Povich makes a cameo during the monologue.; Kirsten Dunst appears in this episode as a girl in the Bizilady commercial.
277	11	Christopher Walken	Bonnie Raitt	January 20, 1990
Credited Featured Players: Mike Myers; Bonnie Raitt performs "Have a Heart" and "Thing Called Love".; The first appearance of "The Continental" series of sketches
278	12	Quincy Jones	Quincy Jones; Tevin Campbell; Kool Moe Dee; Big Daddy Kane	February 10, 1990
Credited Featured Players: Al Franken; Quincy Jones' monologue consists of a performance of Dizzy Gillespie's "Manteca" by an expanded SNL Band. Jones dedicated the performance to Nelson Mandela, who was released from prison in South Africa the next day after having been imprisoned for 27 years.; Jones joins the musical guests in performing "Back on the Block" and "Wee B. Dooinit".; Kool Moe Dee, Melle Mel, and Jones' son Quincy Jones III appear in the "Crown Heights" sketch.; This episode contains the largest number of musical guests in an episode, with a total of ten: Tevin Campbell, Kool Moe Dee, Big Daddy Kane, Melle Mel, Quincy Jones III, Andraé & Sandra Crouch, Siedah Garrett, Al Jarreau, and Take 6.
279	13	Tom Hanks	Aerosmith	February 17, 1990
Credited Featured Players: Al Franken; Aerosmith performs "Janie's Got a Gun" and "Monkey on My Back". The band also appears in the "Wayne's World" sketch, in which they perform the theme song.; Mike Myers is upgraded to repertory status starting with this episode.
280	14	Fred Savage	Technotronic	February 24, 1990
Credited Featured Players: (none); Technotronic performs "Pump Up the Jam" and "Get Up! (Before the Night Is Over)".; Savage's mother Joanne appears during the monologue, and his sister Kala appears in the "Imaginary Friend" sketch.; Rosie Perez made an appearance as one of the dancers in the second performance.; Neil Patrick Harris was nearly chosen to host this episode, as mentioned in his monologue in 2009.; Savage was the first host to have been born after the show's 1975 debut.
281	15	Rob Lowe	The Pogues	March 17, 1990
Credited Featured Players: A. Whitney Brown; The Pogues performs "White City" and "The Body of an American".; Chevy Chase appears during the goodnights.
282	16	Debra Winger	Eric Clapton	March 24, 1990
Credited Featured Players: (none); Eric Clapton performs "No Alibis", "Pretending" and "Wonderful Tonight".
283	17	Corbin Bernsen	The Smithereens	April 14, 1990
Credited Featured Players: (none); The Smithereens performs "A Girl Like You" and "Blues Before and After".
284	18	Alec Baldwin	The B-52's	April 21, 1990
Credited Featured Players: A. Whitney Brown; The B-52's performs "Cosmic Thing" and "Channel Z".; SNL writers and future cast members Rob Schneider and David Spade appears in "The Environmentally Conscious One" sketch; Rob Schneider also appears in "The Garbo I Knew" sketch.; Writer Conan O'Brien appears in the "Nude Talk Show" sketch.
285	19	Andrew Dice Clay	Julee Cruise; Spanic Boys	May 12, 1990
Credited Featured Players: (none); Julee Cruise performs "Falling".; Spanic Boys performs "Keep On Walking".; The show was broadcast on a seven second delay.; Nora Dunn and scheduled musical guest Sinéad O'Connor boycotted this episode in protest of host Andrew Dice Clay's jokes about women. Julee Cruise and Spanic Boys both were quickly booked to replace Sinéad O'Connor. Nora Dunn's contract was not renewed at the end of the season.
286	20	Candice Bergen	The Notting Hillbillies	May 19, 1990
Credited Featured Players: A. Whitney Brown; The Notting Hillbillies performs "Railroad Worksong" and "Love You Too Much".; Nora Dunn and Jon Lovitz's final episode as cast members.

== Special ==
Title	Original release date
"15th Anniversary Special"	September 24, 1989
A special celebrating the 15th anniversary of the show. A long list of cast members, guest hosts, and other special people honor the show's anniversary. Chevy Chase and Garrett Morris appear in the cold open, debating about whether or not Chase is too old to open the show with a pratfall (as he had routinely done when he had been a cast member). Tom Hanks performed the opening monologue, which pokes fun at the cliches of SNL opening monologues in general. Prince and Paul Simon perform. Vintage musical clips include performances from David Bowie and Elvis Costello. John Belushi and Gilda Radner receive tributes in the special. Among the guest hosts was Robin Williams, Mary Tyler Moore and O. J. Simpson. This was the final appearance of Buck Henry on SNL, who was the most frequent host during the original 70s run of the show.
