= A. Whitney Brown =

American comedian (born 1952)

- Born: Alan Whitney Brown; July 8, 1952 (age 74); Charlotte, Michigan, U.S.
- Notable work: Saturday Night Live; The Daily Show
- Spouse(s): Cynthia Swanson (1976–2011); Carolyn Wonderland (2011–present)
- Children: 1

Comedy career
- Years active: 1977–present
- Medium: Comedian, writer, actor

Alan Whitney Brown (born July 8, 1952) is an American comedian, writer and actor. He is best known for his tenure as a writer and cast member on the NBC sketch comedy series Saturday Night Live from 1985 to 1991. He was also one of the original correspondents on Comedy Central's The Daily Show. Brown has been nominated for an Emmy Award four times, winning once.

== Early life ==
Brown was arrested for stealing cars and sent to a reformatory. He never finished high school. He had legal troubles in Toronto, Ontario and spent time in jail in Texas, where he learned to juggle. He followed the Grateful Dead tour as a Deadhead and began busking in San Francisco.

== Career ==
Brown began his career as a street juggler, and he became a stand-up comedian after entering the 1977 San Francisco Comedy Competition. Early television appearances include Showtime's The Big Laff Off (1978), Late Night with David Letterman (1983), and The Tonight Show Starring Johnny Carson (1986). He became a member of the Writer's Guild when he was hired by Lorne Michaels to join the writing staff of Saturday Night Live in 1985; he was also a featured performer, most notably on a Weekend Update segment called The Big Picture. He shared an office with Chris Farley. He won a 1989 Emmy Award for Outstanding Writing in a Variety or Music Program, along with Al Franken, Tom Davis, Phil Hartman, Mike Myers, Lorne Michaels and Conan O'Brien.

He worked briefly for the liberal radio network Air America Radio during its start-up period in early 2004.

He also wrote the screenplay for an episode of HBO's horror anthology show Tales from the Crypt named "Collection Completed."

== Personal life ==
On March 4, 2011, Brown married Carolyn Wonderland, a blues singer and guitarist, in Austin, Texas. The marriage was officiated by Michael Nesmith of The Monkees. Brown was previously married to Cynthia Swanson, a New York newspaper designer, from 1976 to 2011.

== Works ==
- The Big Picture: An American Commentary. HarperCollins, 1991. ISBN 0-06-096825-7
