= Nora Dunn =

American actress and comedian (born 1952)

- Born: April 29, 1952 (age 74); Chicago, Illinois, U.S.
- Occupations: Actress, comedian, writer
- Years active: 1985–present
- Spouses: Ray Hutcherson (m. 1987; div. 1995) Sean McGarry (m. 1998; div. 2000)
- Relatives: Kevin Dunn (brother)

Nora Dunn (born April 29, 1952) is an American actress, comedian and writer. She first garnered popularity during her tenure as a cast member on the NBC sketch comedy series Saturday Night Live from 1985 to 1990. Following her departure from SNL, she played Dr. Reynolds in The Nanny from 1998 to 1999, and she had a recurring role as Muriel in Home Economics from 2021 to 2022.

== Early life ==
Dunn was born in Chicago, Illinois, the daughter of Margaret (née East), a nurse, and John Dunn, a musician and poet. She has two brothers, actor Kevin Dunn and Michael Dunn, a high school history teacher and football coach, as well as one sister, Cathy Zimmerman. She was raised in a Catholic family, and has Irish, English, Scottish and German ancestry. She attended the School of the Art Institute of Chicago.

== Career ==
=== Saturday Night Live ===
Dunn joined SNL in 1985 with the return of Lorne Michaels as executive producer. The 1985–1986 season proved to be a ratings disaster, and she was one of only five cast members who was not fired at its end (the others were newcomers Jon Lovitz, A. Whitney Brown, Dennis Miller and longtime featured player Al Franken).

Dunn's characters included half of "The Sweeney Sisters" lounge act alongside Jan Hooks, as well as talk show host Pat Stevens (which became a popular recurring role starting in the low-rated 1985–1986 season), melodramatic French hooker Babette, and film buff Ashley Ashley from the "Actors on Film" sketch from the 1985–1986 season. Her impressions included Ann Landers, Imelda Marcos, Liza Minnelli, Tyne Daly, Joan Baez, Martina Navratilova, and Cokie Roberts.

Dunn made headlines in 1990 when she, along with original musical guest Sinéad O'Connor, boycotted an episode that was hosted by comedian Andrew Dice Clay because they found his misogynistic humor offensive. Looking back on the incident ahead of SNL's 40th anniversary, she explained, "Lorne said, 'Andrew Dice Clay was a phenomenon worth examining.' And yeah, he was a phenomenon, but if you’re going to examine him, he shouldn’t be the host, you should write an article. We didn’t examine the hosts of "SNL." We supported them, we wrote for them, and we made them look good. Otherwise you'd never get a host. You're there to make them look good [...] My objection to Andrew Dice Clay was that his character was only about one thing: abusing women and laughing about abusing women. There was nothing else behind it. There was nothing else about it except to make him look harmless."

==== Recurring characters on SNL ====
- Ashley Ashley, a pretentious film critic from the recurring sketch, "Actors on Film" (her partner was Jimmy Chance, played by Robert Downey, Jr.)
- Babette, a melodramatic French prostitute
- Pat Stevens, a model turned talk show host
- Denise Venetti, host of "Learning To Feel"
- Dr. Norma Hoeffering, a lesbian psychiatrist who writes male-bashing self-help books
- Liz Sweeney, one of two singing sisters (the other played by Jan Hooks)
- Loose Chang, Ching Chang's (Dana Carvey) love interest
- Mrs. Campbell, Wayne Campbell's (Mike Myers) mom

==== Celebrity impersonations ====
- Ann Landers
- Imelda Marcos
- Liza Minnelli
- Tyne Daly
- Martina Navratilova
- Cokie Roberts
- Jeane Dixon
- Jeane Kirkpatrick
- Joan Baez
- Brigitte Nielsen
- B.D. Hyman
- Catherine Deneuve
- Donna Rice
- Barbara Bush
- Cindy Adams
- Barbara Merrill
- Leona Helmsley
- Linda Dano
- Peggy Lee
- Shelley Duvall
- Marilyn Quayle
- Pat Schroeder
- Linda Ellerbee
- Mary Hart
- Raisa Gorbacheva
- Frida Kahlo
- Benazir Bhutto

=== Other work ===
Dunn appeared in recurring roles on Sisters from 1993 to 1996 and The Nanny from 1998 to 1999, as well as a guest-starring role in a two-part episode of The X-Files in 1998. In the 8th episode of the 9th season of crime procedural drama Bones, she played author Tess Brown, a feuding rival of protagonist Temperance Brennan. In 2015 she appeared in the fourth season of New Girl. In 2009, Dunn played the sister-in-law of Frank Reynolds in It's Always Sunny in Philadelphia.

Her film work includes Working Girl (1988), How I Got into College (1989), Miami Blues (1990), I Love Trouble (1994), Shake, Rattle and Rock! (1994), The Last Supper (1995), Three Kings (1999), What Planet Are You From? (2000), What's the Worst That Could Happen? (2001), Zoolander (2001), Max Keeble's Big Move (2001), Bruce Almighty (2003), Runaway Jury (2003), The Hebrew Hammer (2003), Love for Rent (2005), Pineapple Express (2008), My Suicide (2009), LOL (2012), Entourage (2015) and The Lost Husband (2020).

In 2014, Dunn began appearing in a series of commercials for Clorox. She has also been a storytelling contributor to Chicago's Under the Gun Theater.

Dunn directed the American Theater Company's production of Augusta in Chicago in 2008.

== Personal life ==
Dunn is a fan of the Chicago Bears of the National Football League and the Chicago Blackhawks of the National Hockey League.

== Filmography ==
=== Television ===
Year	Title	Role	Notes
1985–1990	Saturday Night Live	Herself/Various	88 episodes
1991	Get a Life	Irma	Episode: "Prisoner of Love"
1992	Civil Wars	Madeline Lobell	Episode: "The Old Man and the 'C'"
1993	Basic Values: Sex, Shock & Censorship in the 90's		TV movie
1993–1996	Sisters	Norma Lear	24 episodes
1994	Shake, Rattle and Rock!	Margo	TV movie
1996	The Nanny	Mrs. Richardson	Episode: "The Bird's Nest"
1997	I Am Weasel	Bearded Girl/Lady Fan #1	Voice role; Episode: "Deep Sea Tour"
1997	Cybill	Dr. Walker	Episode: "Regarding Henry"
1997	Extreme Ghostbusters	Lilith	Voice role; Episode: "A Temporary Insanity"
1997	Everybody Loves Raymond	Helen	Episode: "The Letter"
1998	George and Leo	Dean Shirley Martin	Episode: "The Bongos"
1998	Pinky and the Brain	Precious	Episode: "Brainwashed: Part 3 - Wash Harder"
1998	The X-Files	JoAnne Fletcher	2 episodes
1998–1999	The Nanny	Dr. Reynolds	7 episodes
1998–2000	Histeria!	Lydia Karaoke/Various	26 episodes
1999	The Wild Thornberrys	Various	Voice role; 2 episodes
2000	Chicken Soup for the Soul	Mrs. Shaw	Episode: "The Mustang and the Tutor"
2000	Futurama	Morgan Proctor	Episode: "How Hermes Requisitioned His Groove Back"
2001	The Chronicle	Dr. Gorham	Episode: "Only the Young Die Good"
2001	Weakest Link	Herself	Contestant Episodes: "Comedians Special"
2001	Curb Your Enthusiasm	CBS Executive	Episode: "The Massage"
2002	The Outer Limits	Laura Sinclair	Episode: "Dark Child"
2003	Knee High P.I.	Margery	TV movie
2003	Just Shoot Me!	Naomi	Episode: "Strange Bedfellows"
2003	CSI: Miami	Kidnap Executive Rhonda	Episode: "Extreme"
2004	Wild Card	Sammie	Episode: "Slam Dunk Funk"
2005	See Arnold Run	Arianna Huffington	TV movie
2005	LAX		Episode: "Senator's Daughter"
2005	Amber Frey: Witness for the Prosecution	Gloria Allred	TV movie
2005	Stacked	Lynn	Episode: "Heavy Meddle"
2006	Law & Order	Rosalie Schaffner	Episode: "Home Sweet"
2006	Three Moons Over Milford	Michelle Graybar	9 episodes
2006–2007	Shark	Gretchen Curbow	2 episodes
2006–2011	Entourage	Dr. Marcus	6 episodes
2007–2008	Boston Legal	Attorney Cynthia Rhodes	2 episodes
2008	Aliens in America	Sandy Shermer	Episode: "Smutty Books"
2008	Numbers	Susan Stone	Episode: "Jack of All Trades"
2009	Criminal Minds	Lauren	Episode: "Pleasure Is My Business"
2009	Pushing Daisies	Blanche Ramora	Episode: "Kerpulnk'"
2009	Samantha Who?	Cheryl Hainstock	Episode: "The Dream Job"
2009	It's Always Sunny in Philadelphia	Donna	Episode: "The Gang Gives Frank an Intervention"
2009	As Told by Ginger	Coach Candace/Philbert	Voice role 2 episodes
2010	Private Practice	Dr. Geraldine Ginsberg	Episode: "Eyes Wide Open"
2010	Psych	Eve Asher	Episode: "In Plain Fright"
2010	The Defenders	Amber Max	Episode: "Nevada v. Dennis"
2011	Harry's Law	Judge Sandra Killiam	Episode: "Last Dance"
2012	Don't Trust the B— in Apartment 23	Joyce Berman	Episode: "Parent Trap"
2013	The Neighbors	Linda	Episode: "The Gingerbread Man"
2013	Franklin & Bash	Judge Clemons	Episode: "By the Numbers"
2013–2014	Bones	Tess Brown	2 episodes
2014	Hot in Cleveland	Elizabeth/Victoria	Episode: "Playmates"
2014	Mulaney	Patty Mulaney	Episode: "In the Name of the Mother, and the Son and the Holy Andre"
2014–2015	Sirens	Bridget	2 episodes
2015	Girlfriends' Guide to Divorce	Amanda	Episode: "Rule #3: Don't Stand in the Doorway"
2015–2016	Best Friends Whenever	Janet Smythe	6 episodes
2015–2016	New Girl	Louise Schmidt	4 episodes
2016	Life in Pieces	Carol	Episode: "CryTunes Divorce Tablet Ring"
2016	*Loosely Exactly Nicole	Nora McNab	Episode: "Danny Boom"
2016	Grace and Frankie	Dr. Rossmore	Episode: "The Wish"
2016–2022	Chicago Med	Dr. Richardson	10 episodes
2016–2017	Graves	Laura Wolf	2 episodes
2017	2 Broke Girls	Teresa	2 episodes
2017	Chicago P.D.	Dr. Richardson	Episode: "Army of One"
2017	Worst Cooks in America	Herself	Contestant - Third Place
2017–2019	How to Get Away with Murder	Judge Lily Nanjani	2 episodes
2018	The Librarians	Janet Hedge	Episode: "And a Town Called Feud"
2018	Detroiters	Sue	Episode: "Trevor"
2018	The Boss Baby: Back in Business	Gigi	Voice role; 10 episodes
2019	Liza on Demand	Claudine	Episode: "Maximum Occupancy"
2021	The Big Leap	Gina	5 episodes
2021–2022	Home Economics	Muriel	11 episodes
2022	DMZ	Oona	2 episodes

=== Film ===
Year	Title	Role
1988	Working Girl	Ginny
1989	How I Got into College	Francine Bauer
1990	Miami Blues	Ellita Sanchez
1991	Stepping Out	Pam
1992	Passion Fish	Ti-Marie Robichaux
1993	Born Yesterday	Cynthia Screiber
1994	I Love Trouble	Lindy
1995	The Last Supper	Sheriff Alice Stanley
1998	Bulworth	Missy Berliner
1998	Air Bud: Golden Receiver	Natalya
1998	The Thin Pink Line	Sandy Delongpre
1999	Drop Dead Gorgeous	Colleen Douglas
1999	Three Kings	Adriana Cruz
2000	What Planet Are You From?	Madeline
2001	Heartbreakers	Miss Madress
2001	What's the Worst That Could Happen?	Lutetia Fairbanks
2001	Zoolander	British Designer
2001	Max Keeble's Big Move	Lily Keeble
2002	Cherish	Bell
2002	Storm Watch	Rose Chase
2003	Die, Mommie, Die!	Shatzi Van Allen
2003	The Hebrew Hammer	Mrs. Carver
2003	Bruce Almighty	Ally Loman
2003	Out of Time	Dr. Donovan
2003	Runaway Jury	Stella Hulic
2004	November	Dr. Fayn
2004	Paper Cut	Katherine
2004	Laws of Attraction	Judge Abramovitz
2005	The Civilization of Maxwell Bright	Mary Jane
2005	Love for Rent	Helen Bauman
2005	The Prize Winner of Defiance, Ohio	Girl Group Member
2006	The Darwin Awards	Mrs. Pearlman
2006	Pucked	Leona
2006	Southland Tales	Cyndi Pinziki
2008	Pineapple Express	Shannon
2009	The Answer Man	Terry Fraser
2009	Archie's Final Project	Gretchen Williams
2009	It's Complicated	Sally
2012	LOL	Emily's Mom
2012	3, 2, 1... Frankie Go Boom	Mom (Karen)
2012	The Guilt Trip	Amy
2015	Entourage	Dr. Marcus
2015	A Light Beneath Their Feet	Dr. Krolly
2018	Dude	Rosa
2018	Canal Street	Marge Sudermill
2018	Tag	Lina Malloy
2018	The Oath	Eleanor
2019	Boy Genius	Selma Ally
2020	The Lost Husband	Jean
2021	Together Together	Adele
2022	The Hater	Genie
