= Saturday Night Live season 6 =

Saturday Night Live
- Season 6
- Starring: Denny Dillon; Robin Duke; Gilbert Gottfried; Tim Kazurinsky; Gail Matthius; Eddie Murphy; Joe Piscopo; Ann Risley; Charles Rocket; Tony Rosato
- No. of episodes: 13

Release
- Original network: NBC
- Original release: November 15, 1980 – April 11, 1981

Season chronology
- ← Previous season 5 Next → season 7

The sixth season of Saturday Night Live, an American sketch comedy series, originally aired in the United States on NBC between November 15, 1980, and April 11, 1981. Jean Doumanian, who had been an associate producer for the first five seasons of SNL, was given executive producer responsibilities after Lorne Michaels left the show, along with all the cast and almost all the writing staff. (Michaels would return five years later.) Doumanian's first—and only—season in charge was plagued by difficulties, from a reduced budget to new cast members who were compared unfavorably to the Not Ready for Prime Time Players. Critical reception was strongly negative and ratings sank.

After cast member Charles Rocket swore on air in the February 21, 1981 episode, NBC president of entertainment Brandon Tartikoff fired Doumanian and hired Dick Ebersol to improve the show.

On March 10, 1981, Doumanian told Variety that she was "stepping aside" in hopes "the network will be successful in realizing the full potential of the show."

Ebersol's first produced episode was on April 11, 1981. The 1981 Writers Guild of America strike forced the season to end at episode 13.

This season was alternatively known as Saturday Night Live '80.

== Background ==
Executive producer Lorne Michaels cited burnout as the reason behind his desire to take a year off, and had been led to believe by NBC executives that the show would go on hiatus with him, and be ready to start fresh upon his return.

Jean Doumanian hired Denny Dillon, Gilbert Gottfried, Gail Matthius, Joe Piscopo, Ann Risley and Charles Rocket as repertory players, and Yvonne Hudson, Matthew Laurance and Patrick Weathers as featured players. In doing so, she passed on then-unknown performers like Jim Carrey, Mercedes Ruehl, Sandra Bernhard, John Goodman and Paul Reubens. Andy Kaufman offered to contribute a weekly segment but was turned down. Doumanian sought an African-American male cast member to fill Garrett Morris' previous role. As SNL historians Doug Hill and Jeff Weingrad phrase it,

Jean still needed an ethnic, and a special series of auditions was set up to find one. For two days in mid-September some thirty black actors and comedians filed through the writers' wing on the 17th floor [of Rockefeller Center] to read for Jean and her people. At the end, Jean told her group she was leaning toward hiring a stand-up by the name of Charlie Barnett. But talent coordinator Neil Levy had another black performer he wanted her to see, a kid from Roosevelt, Long Island, named Eddie Murphy.

In September 1980, Levy received a telephone call from 19-year-old Murphy, who had begged the producer to "give him a shot" on the show, but was initially rejected since "the black cast member had already been chosen." Some accounts state that Doumanian preferred Robert Townsend. Nevertheless, Murphy was added (as a featured player) starting with the fourth episode, after much convincing from her colleagues and staff.

The part for an African-American female cast member was filled by Hudson. She appeared on SNL in 14 episodes from 1978 to 1980 as an uncredited actress and had acted alongside Garrett Morris. Her recognition as SNL's first Black female cast member started when she was credited as a featured player in 1980.

=== First episode ===
The first episode, renamed "Saturday Night Live '80" in the opening credits, aired on November 15, 1980, and featured an all-new cast – Charles Rocket, Denny Dillon, Gilbert Gottfried, Gail Matthius, Joe Piscopo, and Ann Risley. Elliott Gould was booked to host the first episode.

In the first sketch the cast shared a bed with Gould and introduced themselves – Rocket proclaimed himself to be a cross between Chevy Chase and Bill Murray and Gottfried referred to himself as a cross between John Belushi "and that guy from last year who did Rod Serling, and no one can remember his name" (referring to Harry Shearer). Doumanian said in an interview in 1980, "Rather than make references to the last cast in any derogatory way, I felt we should say to everybody, 'Look, this is what you're going to think, anyway. So here they are and they'll tell you who they think they remind you of.'

At the end of the show, Gould stood on stage and quickly introduced himself to the cast one more time by first name and declared "We're gonna be around forever, so we might as well..."

=== "Who Shot C.R.?" ===
On February 21, 1981 the show featured a parody of the "Who Shot J.R.?" craze from the soap opera Dallas. In a cliffhanger titled "Who Shot C.R.?", cast member Charles Rocket was "shot" in the last sketch of the episode, after a running gag in which other members of the cast shared their grievances about Rocket with one another. Onstage for the goodnights, Dallas star and that week's host Charlene Tilton asked Rocket (still in character and sitting in a wheelchair) his thoughts on being shot. "Oh man, it's the first time I've been shot in my life", he replied. "I'd like to know who the fuck did it." The cast, along with some of the audience, reacted with laughter and applause, but inside the control room, there was outrage. Director Dave Wilson, fearing that the show was finished for good, simply threw his script papers in the air and said "Well, that's the end of live television" and walked out of the room.

=== Bill Murray hosts ===
Bill Murray hosted the episode on March 7, 2 weeks after the Rocket incident. Morale had sunk in the writer's room to the point that some writers implored Bill's brother, writer Brian Doyle-Murray, to not let Bill come on the show because they did not want the ratings to go up and keep the show going longer. Murray, a friend of Doumanian, agreed to host as a favor and doing so convinced NBC's head of programming Brandon Tartikoff to keep the show on for another week.

The cold open for the episode revolved around Murray telling the cast that in spite of previous setbacks, "it just doesn't matter." This was a reference to Murray's 1979 film Meatballs. Additionally, Murray jokingly told Rocket to "watch his mouth and clean it up".

Writer Pamela Norris said of Murray's appearance "It was like The Truth Teller had arrived." Murray had livened the mood of the cast and crew throughout the week. However, by the end of the episode, Murray had apologized to his old cast members by name for appearing on the episode and when Rocket tried to hug Murray, he rebuffed him.

Years later Murray was interviewed for the book Live from New York: The Complete Uncensored History of Saturday Night Live as Told by Its Stars, Writers, and Guests, where he said that he believed Doumanian had not been given a fair shot, and said the cast was unprepared for the demands of the show, the sudden attention, and the task of replacing the original cast.

=== Hiatus ===
After Bill Murray's episode, the next episode was scheduled for March 14, 1981 and would have been hosted by Robert Guillaume with musical guest Ian Dury and the Blockheads. Subsequent reruns of the episode partially edit the good nights segment to remove the announcement for next week's episode. The cast and writers were also unaware that Brandon Tartikoff, the head of programming for NBC, invited Dick Ebersol, the original developer of SNL, to watch the show in secrecy in the control booth and was totally in despair over how the quality of the show sank.

Doumanian was officially replaced by Ebersol after the Murray episode. In his first two weeks, Ebersol fired Gottfried, Risley, and Rocket, replacing them with Robin Duke, Tim Kazurinsky, and Tony Rosato. At the end of the season, he would eliminate the rest of the 1980 cast except for Murphy and Piscopo. Ebersol originally wanted to bring in John Candy and Catherine O'Hara from SCTV; Candy turned down the offer. O'Hara initially accepted the job, but immediately quit after a production meeting where Michael O'Donoghue, an original writer for SNL, berated the cast and writers for the show's poor performances and sketches.

=== Writers' strike ===
Ebersol's first show aired April 11, with appearances by Chevy Chase on Weekend Update, and Al Franken asking viewers to "put SNL to sleep". Ebersol, wanting to establish a connection to the original cast, allowed Franken's tongue-in-cheek routine on the air.

Ebersol had promised Franken and Tom Davis that in addition to appearing on the April 11 show, they could host the next week. During the following week, with a writer's strike looming, Franken and Davis wrote material and mailed it to themselves so that their postmark could be used to prove they did not violate the strike. After seeing copies of the material, Ebersol (never a fan of Franken and Davis) caved to the writer's strike and called off the rest of the season, promising the duo they could host the season premiere that fall. As the summer ended, Ebersol, confident in his new cast, decided he no longer needed a link to the original cast. Franken claims Ebersol never returned his calls, and Franken and Davis never hosted SNL. Franken would not return to SNL until four years later, as a featured cast member.

Other episodes cancelled due to the strike were scheduled to air on April 25, 1981 (with host Dan Aykroyd, former cast member), May 9, 1981 (with host Steve Martin, an SNL favorite), May 16, 1981 (with host Brooke Shields), and May 23, 1981 (with another frequent SNL host, Buck Henry). Aykroyd wouldn't get a chance to host until the 28th season finale in 2003, Martin didn't come back until 1986, Shields has yet to host, and Henry never hosted again.

== Cast ==
=== (Episodes 1–12) ===
**Repertory players**

- Denny Dillon
- Gilbert Gottfried
- **Gail Matthius**
- Eddie Murphy (first episode: November 22, 1980 / first speaking role: December 6, 1980 / first episode as a cast member: December 13, 1980 / upgraded to repertory status on February 7, 1981)
- Joe Piscopo
- Ann Risley
- **Charles Rocket**

**Featured players**

- Yvonne Hudson (first episode: February 18 1978 / first speaking role: November 10 1979 / first episode as a cast member: December 20, 1980 / demoted to uncredited roles until 1984 departure)
- Matthew Laurance (first episode: December 13, 1980)
- Patrick Weathers (first episode: December 13, 1980)

bold denotes Weekend Update anchor

Murphy is credited for five episodes as a featured player before becoming part of the main cast. Hudson was credited for seven episodes as a featured player and uncredited in four. Laurance and Weathers were credited for eight episodes (though Weathers did not appear in his seventh episode).

=== (Episode 13) ===
**Repertory players**

- Denny Dillon
- Robin Duke
- Tim Kazurinsky
- Gail Matthius
- Eddie Murphy
- Joe Piscopo
- Tony Rosato

**Featured players**

- Laurie Metcalf
- Emily Prager (credited, but did not appear)

== Writers ==
Brian Doyle-Murray returned as the only writer from the previous season. Barry Blaustein, David Sheffield, Pamela Norris and Terry Sweeney were also hired; the latter would become a cast member in 1985. Musician and Smothers Brothers Comedy Hour writer Mason Williams was the season's first head writer but left after clashing with Doumanian. Jeremy Stevens and Tom Moore joined as head writers for the remaining Doumanian shows. Michael O'Donoghue was rehired after Doumanian's firing, as a head writer, alongside Bob Tischler (who was also in a head writer role).

This season's writers included Larry Arnstein, Barry W. Blaustein, Billy Brown, Ferris Butler, John DeBellis, Jean Doumanian, Nancy Dowd, Brian Doyle-Murray, Leslie Fuller, Mel Green, David Hurwitz, Judy Jacklin, Sean Kelly, Mitchell Kriegman, Patricia Marx, Douglas McGrath, Tom Moore, Matt Neuman, Pamela Norris, Michael O'Donoghue, Mark Reisman, David Sheffield, Jeremy Stevens, Terry Sweeney, Bob Tischler, Mason Williams and Dirk Wittenborn.

For the next season, in addition to O'Donoghue and Tischler being maintained as the head writers; the only other writers to return were Blaustein, Norris, Sheffield, and Doyle-Murray (Doyle-Murray was not credited for the season finale).

== Episodes ==
No. overall	No. in season	Host	Musical guest(s)	Original release date
107	1	Elliott Gould	Kid Creole & the Coconuts	November 15, 1980
Kid Creole & the Coconuts perform "Mister Softee" and "There But for the Grace of God Go I".; The cold opening has Elliott Gould (in his sixth time hosting) in bed with many of the cast members (a play on Gould's 1969 film Bob & Carol & Ted & Alice), who tries to allay their anxieties, and tells Gail Matthius she is "kind of a cross between Jane [Curtin] and Gilda [Radner]." Charles Rocket announces that he is a cross between Chevy Chase and Bill Murray, Ann Risley says she is "a cross between Gilda and Laraine [Newman]" and Gilbert Gottfried calls himself a cross between John Belushi and "that guy from last year" who did a Rod Serling impression (Harry Shearer).; The first sketch, set in the Oval Office, showed Rosalynn Carter (Ann Risley) trying to seduce Jimmy Carter (Joe Piscopo) who is still depressed over his defeat in the 1980 presidential election, with Amy played by Dillon.; In the debut of the "Rocket Report" segment, Rocket pesters people around The Dakota for information about John Lennon's upcoming album.; A short film by The Blue Lagoon director Randal Kleiser titled "Foot Fetish" is shown.; A music video directed by Jonathan Demme for the song "Gidget Goes To Hell" by the post-punk band Suburban Lawns also appears.; Wendie Malick appears in the background of the Nose Wrestling sketch.; Denny Dillon, Gilbert Gottfried, Gail Matthius, Joe Piscopo, Ann Risley and Charles Rocket's first episode as cast members.; Jean Doumanian's first episode as executive producer.
108	2	Malcolm McDowell	Captain Beefheart & His Magic Band	November 22, 1980
Captain Beefheart & His Magic Band performs "Hot Head" and "Ashtray Heart"; Charles Rocket interviews John Lennon (played by Malcolm McDowell) during Weekend Update.; Joe Piscopo's Saturday Night Sports segment during Weekend Update debuts on this episode.; This episode features a sketch attempting to satirize the Greensboro massacre, which many consider to be a low point for this season. "Commie Hunting Season" had no audience laughter or response, and the piece was cut from any future airings of the episode.; Eddie Murphy makes his first SNL appearance in this episode in an uncredited cameo, in a sketch called "In Search of the Negro Republican," written by David Sheffield. Also present in the sketch are future featured players Yvonne Hudson and Matthew Laurance.; NOTE: Many SNL veterans (as of 1985) consider this episode as the single worst night in the program's history.
109	3	Ellen Burstyn	Aretha Franklin; Keith Sykes	December 6, 1980
Aretha Franklin performs "United Together" and "Can't Turn You Loose".; Keith Sykes performs "B.I.G. T.I.M.E.".; A short film entitled "Fish Heads" for the Barnes & Barnes song of the same title appears, directed by and starring Bill Mumy and Bill Paxton. Dr. Demento also appears in the short.; Eddie Murphy debuts as a "Weekend Update" commentator.
110	4	Jamie Lee Curtis	James Brown; Ellen Shipley	December 13, 1980
James Brown performs "Rapp Payback (Where Iz Moses)" and an extended medley of his early hits "Papa's Got a Brand New Bag", "I Got You (I Feel Good)", "Small Man" and "Please, Please, Please".; Ellen Shipley performs "Fotogenic".; Danny DeVito appeared in a black and white film short Hot Dogs for Gauguin.; Credited Featured Players: Matthew Laurance, Eddie Murphy, Patrick Weathers; Laurance, Murphy and Weathers' first episode as cast members.; During the goodnights Jamie Lee Curtis reminded the audience that a 10 minute vigil would be held for John Lennon the next day, as he had been assassinated 5 days prior to the show.
111	5	David Carradine	Linda Ronstadt; The Cast of The Pirates of Penzance	December 20, 1980
Linda Ronstadt and the cast of The Pirates of Penzance perform a medley of tunes from The Pirates of Penzance production ("I Am the Very Model of a Modern Major-General", "Oh, Is There Not One Maiden Breast", "Poor Wandering One" and "Go Ye, Heroes"), Mr. Bill, Miss Sally, and Spot talk about Mr. Bill's Christmas holiday for the past years and how things ended up turned bad for him against his enemies, Sluggo and Mr. Hands and perform a medley of Christmas carols ("O come, O come, Emmanuel", "Joy to the World" and "The First Noel").; Yvonne Hudson's first episode as a cast member.; Credited Featured Players: Yvonne Hudson, Matthew Laurance, Eddie Murphy, Patrick Weathers; Writer Mitchell Kriegman was fired by Jean Doumanian during Weekend Update backstage.
112	6	Ray Sharkey	Jack Bruce & Friends	January 10, 1981
Jack Bruce & Friends perform "Dancing On Air" and "Living Without Ja".; Eddie Murphy delivered the line Live from New York, it's Saturday Night!; Gail Matthius' first episode as Weekend Update co-anchor.; Eddie Murphy performs a stand-up monologue when the show was in danger of running five minutes short.; Credited Featured Players: Yvonne Hudson, Matthew Laurance, Eddie Murphy, Patrick Weathers
113	7	Karen Black	Cheap Trick; Stanley Clarke Trio	January 17, 1981
Cheap Trick performs "Baby Loves to Rock" and "Can't Stop It But I'm Gonna Try".; Stanley Clarke Trio performs "Wild Dog".; Credited Featured Players: Yvonne Hudson, Matthew Laurance, Eddie Murphy, Patrick Weathers
114	8	Robert Hays	Joe "King" Carrasco & the Crowns; 14 Karat Soul	January 24, 1981
Joe "King" Carrasco & the Crowns perform "Don't Bug Me Baby"; 14 Karat Soul performs "I Wish That We Were Married" and "This Time It's for Real".; Eddie Murphy announces that he has been promoted from featured player to repertory player in this episode.; Credited Featured Players: Matthew Laurance, Eddie Murphy, Patrick Weathers; Yvonne Hudson is not credited and does not appear in this episode.
115	9	Sally Kellerman	Jimmy Cliff	February 7, 1981
Jimmy Cliff performs "I Am the Living" and "Gone Clear".; Sally Kellerman performs "Starting Over Again".; Credited Featured Players: Yvonne Hudson, Matthew Laurance, Patrick Weathers
116	10	Deborah Harry	Deborah Harry; Funky Four Plus One	February 14, 1981
Deborah Harry performs "Love T.K.O." and "Come Back Jonee".; With this show, Funky Four Plus One become the first hip-hop act to perform on SNL, as well as the first to appear on national television. They perform "That's the Joint".; Credited Featured Players: Yvonne Hudson, Matthew Laurance, Patrick Weathers
117	11	Charlene Tilton	Todd Rundgren; Prince	February 21, 1981
Todd Rundgren performs "Healer" and "Time Heals"; Prince performs "Partyup"; Guest appearance by Don King.; Gail Matthius' sister Jane plays Nancy Reagan initially in the "Haunted Lincoln Bedroom" sketch.; The debut of Eddie Murphy's "Mister Robinson's Neighborhood" sketch.; Matthius' final episode as Weekend Update co-anchor.; Credited Featured Players: Yvonne Hudson, Matthew Laurance, Patrick Weathers (Weathers did not appear despite being credited); Larry Hagman was originally chosen to host but he refused so the show went to his co-star Charlene Tilton.; During the goodnights, Charles Rocket (in a wheelchair after "getting shot" during the last sketch, in a parody of the Who shot J.R.? promotion for Dallas, on which Tilton had played Lucy Ewing) grumbles, "I'd like to know who the fuck did it" in response to Tilton's query on how Rocket felt after being gunned down
118	12	Bill Murray	Delbert McClinton	March 7, 1981
Delbert McClinton performs "Givin' It Up for Your Love" and "Shotgun Rider" with Bonnie Bramlett joining him on vocals.; In the cold opening, Bill Murray encourages the cast members not to worry about ratings or reviews.; Mark King appears as Dr. Jonathan Lear during Weekend Update, now called Saturday Night Newsline. The news section appears in three segments (King's science portion, an Oscar predictions segment with Murray and a newscast with Charles Rocket).; Murray reprises his Nick the Lounge Singer character from his 1977–1980 stint on the show.; Paul Shaffer makes a cameo as Nick's pianist.; Murray announces that the next episode would be hosted by Robert Guillaume with musical guest Ian Dury and the Blockheads, but this episode was cancelled when Dick Ebersol replaced Jean Doumanian.; Credited Featured Players: (none); Despite being mentioned by Murray in the opening sketch and making appearances throughout the episode, Yvonne Hudson, Matthew Laurance and Patrick Weathers don't receive onscreen credit.; Gilbert Gottfried, Hudson, Laurance, Ann Risley, Rocket and Weathers's final episode as cast members (although Hudson would continue to make uncredited appearances until 1984).; Doumanian's final episode as executive producer.
119	13	(none)	Jr. Walker & the All-Stars	April 11, 1981
Jr. Walker & the All-Stars perform "(I'm a) Road Runner", "Shotgun", "How Sweet It Is (To Be Loved by You)" and "What Does It Take (To Win Your Love)".; Chevy Chase appeared in the cold open along with Mr. Bill, reminiscing about the good old days, then stumbles and crushes Mr. Bill; Chase returned to anchor Weekend Update.; Al Franken joined Chase on "Weekend Update" to discuss season 6, frequently using the phrase "me, Al Franken", as he had done in previous seasons when arguing that the 1980s be known as "The Al Franken Decade".; Franken announced that he and Tom Davis would host the next episode with musical guest The Grateful Dead, but this episode was cancelled due to the writers' strike.; Prior to introducing Jr. Walker & the All-Stars' second musical number, Chase appeared with Christopher Reeve and Robin Williams to tell the audience the show was improving.; Credited Featured Players: Laurie Metcalf, Emily Prager; Dick Ebersol's first episode as executive producer.; Robin Duke, Tim Kazurinsky and Tony Rosato's first episode as cast members.; Laurie Metcalf and Emily Prager's only episode as cast members (Metcalf appeared only in a pre-taped segment during "Weekend Update"; Prager, despite her billing in the credits, did not appear in the show at all; both hold the record for shortest stint as an SNL cast member).; Denny Dillon and Gail Matthius' final episode as cast members.; Don Pardo's last episode as announcer (until season 8).

== Critical reception ==
Responses to Doumanian's SNL were negative. The Associated Press, mocking the Carters-in-the-Oval-Office sketch, wrote, "The new Saturday Night Live is essentially crude, sophomoric and most of all self-consciously 'cool.' It is occasionally funny ... Under producer Jean Doumanian, Saturday Night Live will define 'risk-taking' as a little naughtier, perhaps a little raunchier; it won't wander too far off the beaten path ... They're all clones. This is television. If they can be funny once in a while, that's all we can ask." Much of the criticism was directed at the style of humor, which journalists said appeared to go for shock value and came across as tasteless.

The New York Times said the season "looked almost exactly as it did in previous years, but actually only the shell remained". The review went on to state that the "missing ingredient was the very quality that made the old show so special: an innovative vision", and that the new show was "nothing so much as an unfunny parody of its predecessor".

Hill and Weingrad summarized other reviews:

The Washington Star said the show "strained and groaned" while the humor was "almost completely lost, despite desperate attempts to wring it out of raunch." Newsday's Marvin Kitman, as expected, ravaged the show gleefully, calling it "offensive and raunchy," and worse, not funny. "This new edition is terrible," he wrote. "Call it 'Saturday Night Dead on Arrival'."

Tom Shales' headline on his review read "FROM YUK TO YECCCH". The first sentence was: "Vile from New York—It's Saturday Night." The show, Shales said, was a "snide and sordid embarrassment". It imitated the "ribaldry and willingness to prod sacred cows" of the Lorne Michaels years without having the least "compensating satirical edge". It was, he wrote, "just haplessly pointless tastelessness". Shales concluded that despite one or two imaginative moments from the show's filmmakers, "from the six new performers and 13 new writers hired for the show, viewers got virtually no good news." ... Jean made it clear that she thought the writing was primarily at fault. "It's just got to be funnier," she said. Then she put a tape of the show on her videocassette machine to begin a sketch-by-sketch critique. According to writer Billy Brown, as she did she said, "Watch this. And I hope you hate it, because you wrote it."

In his book What Were They Thinking? The 100 Dumbest Events in Television History, author David Hofstede included this season as one of 25 runners-up to the list.

== Works cited ==
- Hill, Doug; Weingrad, Jeff (1986). Saturday Night: A Backstage History of Saturday Night Live. Beech Tree Books. ISBN 978-0688050993.
- Shales, Tom; Miller, James Andrew (2002). Live from New York: An Uncensored History of Saturday Night Live. Little, Brown. ISBN 978-0316781466.
