= List of Saturday Night Live incidents =

As a live sketch comedy show, NBC's Saturday Night Live (officially abbreviated to SNL) has been the subject of numerous controversies and incidents since its inception in 1975. These have included controversial performers and content, technical problems, profanities (both intentional and accidental), and joke plagiarism accusations.

Several hosts and musical guests have received negative press due to their appearances on the program, including musician Sinéad O'Connor, comedian Andrew Dice Clay, and the bands Rage Against the Machine and Fear. These controversies have sometimes led to protests and picketing outside SNL's 30 Rockefeller Plaza production location, such as in the case of then-presidential candidate Donald Trump hosting the show in 2015. Frequently, controversial content and mishaps are edited out of syndicated reruns and online-distributed editions of the show. Some of these performers have been reportedly banned from appearing again by executive producer Lorne Michaels, such as Martin Lawrence and Steven Seagal.

== Controversial hosts ==
=== Richard Pryor ===
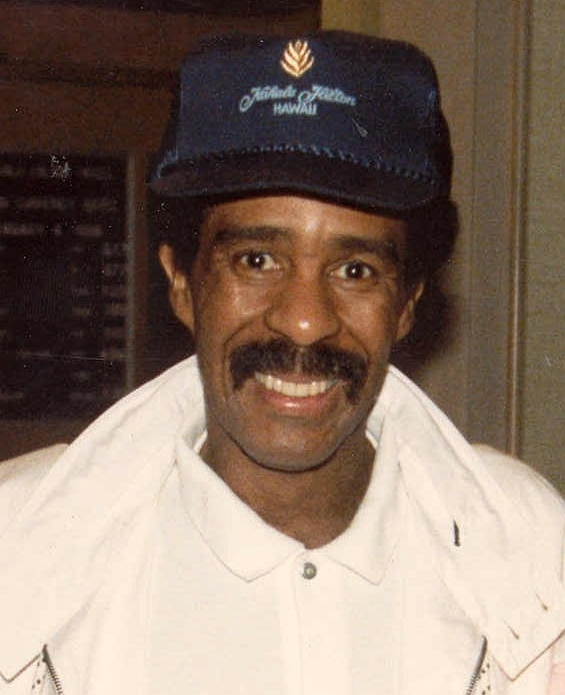
Richard Pryor's 1975 episode was reportedly run on a tape delay.

On December 13, 1975, the show's seventh episode, hosted by comedian Richard Pryor, SNL was ordered by NBC network officials to run the episode on a five-second tape delay. The show's previous six episodes had all aired live on the East Coast.

NBC officials had expressed concerns about Pryor's content, and the possibility of profanity, prior to the broadcast. He was initially disallowed as host entirely, until executive producer Lorne Michaels threatened to walk off the show in protest. Officials then pushed for a ten-second delay, which Michaels negotiated down to five seconds. Pryor, as the first person of color to host the show, found the delay to be an insult (only finding out after the broadcast), and objected to being treated differently than other white comedians had been.

Dave Wilson, SNL's long-time director, later said that the show was in fact broadcast live, as his crew did not know how to work the delay. However, the first edition of The Book of Lists, describing the broadcast, indicated that two words were deleted from the broadcast during Pryor's opening monologue, although what was censored is not specified. NBC reportedly re-engineered their taping machines of the time to create the delay, so that the show would be taped on one machine, and then entirely transferred to another machine for the broadcast.

A sketch from this episode featuring Pryor and cast member Chevy Chase, "Word Association", in which Chase uses the word "nigger", is considered one of the most famous SNL sketches of all time. SNL only used a tape delay two more times in its history following this episode; once for a 1986 episode hosted by Sam Kinison, and again for a 1990 episode hosted by Andrew Dice Clay.

=== Andrew Dice Clay ===
When Andrew Dice Clay was scheduled as a host for the May 12, 1990 episode, cast member Nora Dunn immediately announced to the press that she was boycotting the show in protest. She stated the protest was in view of Clay's perceivably misogynistic act, and she announced her refusal to appear on the program without informing Michaels, the cast, or most of the crew about her intent. The public backlash against his being asked to host the program was immediate; the selection of Clay was compared to the Holocaust by an audience member during an interview with Michaels. Female members of the cast and crew were harassed by phone and mail for sticking with the show, and metal detectors were installed at the studio to enhance security. NBC censors insisted that the episode be aired with a delay to compensate for anything Clay might say on air. During the live show, some audience members heckled Clay but were immediately removed by the increased security detail. Dunn's contract was already coming to an end, and with one episode left in the season, the staff voted against having her take part in the final episode of the season, and her contract was not renewed. Dunn later expressed her surprise at the lack of support she received from her colleagues in her refusal to participate.

Sinéad O'Connor was scheduled to be the musical guest for the episode, but she also boycotted the show because of Clay's involvement, forcing the producers to find two musical replacements, with one performance by Julee Cruise and a second by Spanic Boys.

=== Donald Trump ===
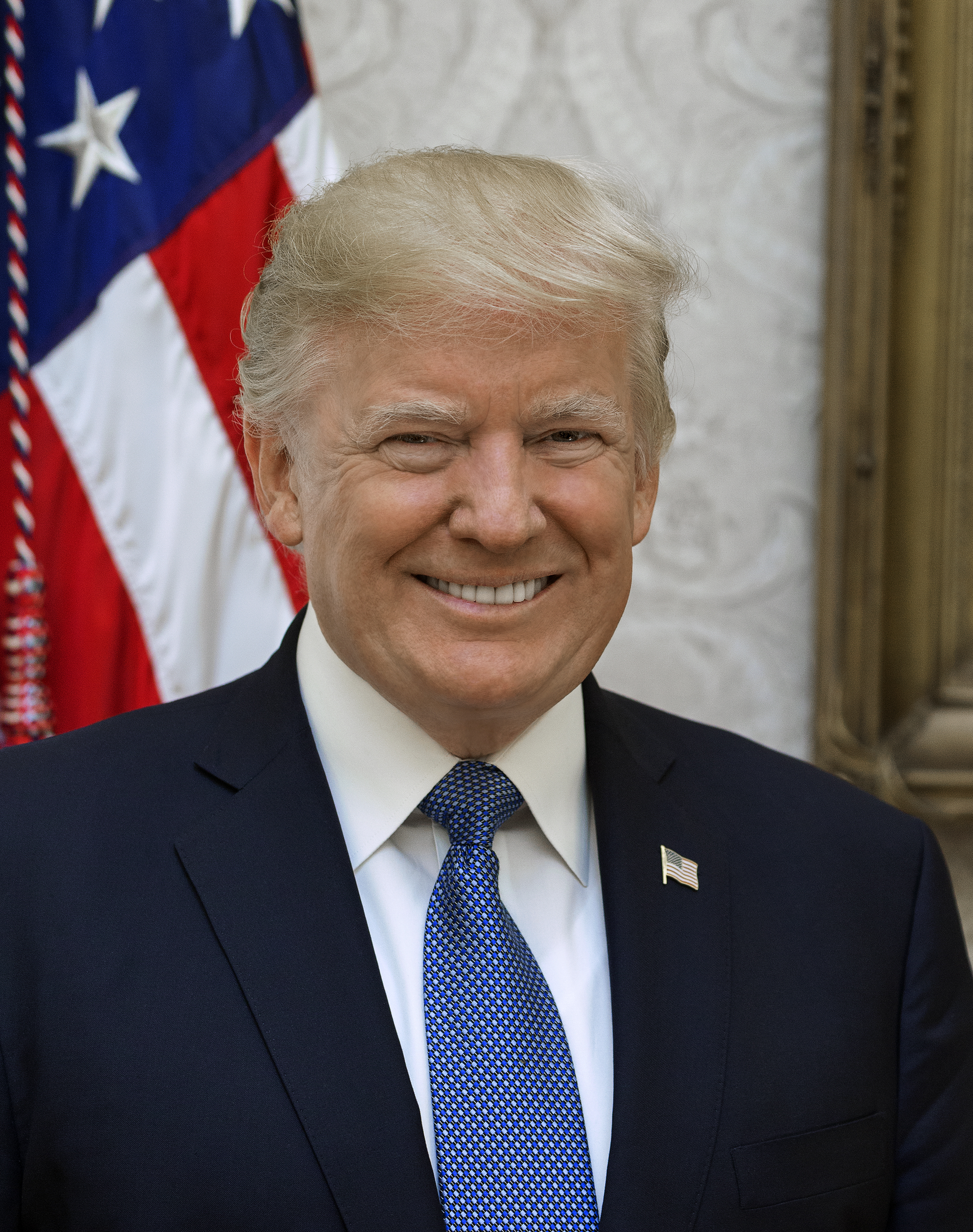
Donald Trump's 2015 appearance invited protests.

Donald Trump's second hosting appearance, in the midst of his 2016 presidential campaign, courted controversy and protests. Latino advocacy groups pressed NBC to cancel Trump's appearance, due to his remarks on Mexican immigration, while protestors picketed Trump Tower and 30 Rockefeller Plaza in the days preceding and of the show, holding "DUMP TRUMP" signs. That group created a petition to cancel Trump's hosting with over 500,000 signatures, delivering it to Michaels and NBCUniversal Chief Executive Steve Burke. The Congressional Hispanic Caucus issued a "statement of opposition" to Trump's appearance. The group DeportRacism.com offered $5,000 in cash to any audience member that would heckle Trump and call him a racist during his monologue.

The show aired on November 7, 2015, and due to the equal-time rule, Trump only appeared for a total of twelve minutes. The notion of heckling was referenced in the show, when Larry David (who had guested earlier in the evening to play politician Bernie Sanders) called Trump a racist, but only to secure the $5,000. In the end, the episode received 9.3 million viewers—the program's highest ratings in nearly four years—but was panned by critics. NBC subsequently offered free airtime to Republican candidates who filed equal time requests.

=== Elon Musk ===
Tesla and SpaceX CEO Elon Musk hosted the May 8, 2021 episode of Saturday Night Live with musical guest Miley Cyrus. The announcement received major criticism and backlash due to Musk's reputedly unlikeable personality and problematic history, with some questioning why Musk was chosen in the first place instead of having Cyrus pull double duty for the third time. Some cast members—Aidy Bryant, Michael Che, Andrew Dismukes, and Bowen Yang—have voiced their opinions about the choice of Musk via Instagram stories. Che and Dismukes joked about the controversy; while Che responded to an angry tweet made by actor John Cusack by confusing him with his sister Joan Cusack, but elsewhere stated "To me, it makes it exciting, I mean, everybody wants to watch now, so that's cool". Bryant and Yang, however, were straightforward with their opinions, with Bryant posting a tweet made by Bernie Sanders about wealthy people such as Musk earning more than the American people during the pandemic, and Yang posted a shocked emoji and a response to a cryptic tweet made by Musk about his hosting gig with Yang saying "what the fuck does this even mean?" Some critics on Twitter claimed this booking was similar to the Donald Trump/Sia episode and blamed Lorne Michaels for making this decision.

=== Woody Harrelson ===
In his opening monologue on February 25, 2023, Woody Harrelson likened public health measures during the COVID-19 pandemic to the actions of a drug cartel, saying:

So the movie goes like this. The biggest drug cartels in the world get together and buy up all the media and all the politicians and force all the people in the world to stay locked in their homes. And people can only come out if they take the cartel’s drugs and keep taking them over and over. I threw the script away. I mean, who was going to believe that crazy idea? Being forced to do drugs? I do that voluntarily all day long.

Harrelson was criticized for his remarks by a number of individuals who saw the monologue, including Matt Wilstein of The Daily Beast who remarked that it "turns out there may have been a reason the rest of the Five-Timers weren’t there to welcome him into their club." However, the monologue was praised by Twitter CEO and owner (and fellow Saturday Night Live host) Elon Musk, who quote tweeted a video from it with a statement reading “So based. Nice work.”

=== Shane Gillis ===
In 2019, Shane Gillis was hired and then fired from SNL due to past clips resurfacing of him making racist and homophobic jokes on a podcast. However, since then, Gillis has hosted three times; his hosting stints have received mixed reviews. On his third time hosting on October 10, 2026, Gillis made a controversial joke about women working out in the gym during his monologue, specifically their clothing, saying that women "dress like whores" and saying men are "not allowed to look. For real, don't look, because they are filming." The jokes received groans from the audience. Afterwards, many viewers slammed the joke as misogynistic, with one user saying that the joke was promoting rape culture. The backlash came amidst the 2024 Cornell University rape allegations lawsuit, which had been filed in September and received national news coverage. In an Instagram story, writer and actor Dan Levy called out Gillis, saying, "Men need to be defending women more," and adding, "This is not a women's issue; this is an everybody issue." Towards the end of the monologue, Gillis also made a joke about his receding hairline, saying that his hair made him look like Adolf Hitler, and brushing it to the side would make him look gay, adding, "You're either gay or you’re Hitler, and isn’t that where we’re at as a country?"

During the broadcast, Gillis also accidentally swore during a sketch based on the book Green Eggs and Ham. This was censored via audio drop-out on the West Coast and internationally. Gillis apologized after uttering the word. In response to the incident, the show's UK edition mocked Gillis during the Weekend Update segment, calling him a "stupid fucking cunt" on live broadcast uncensored.

== Controversial musical guests ==
=== Fear ===
In 1981, director Penelope Spheeris made a film titled The Decline of Western Civilization; the film featured an appearance by the punk rock group Fear. This appearance in particular caught the attention of former cast member John Belushi, who lobbied successfully to get the band a spot as a musical guest on the 1981 Halloween episode of SNL. Belushi had originally offered Fear the soundtrack for his major motion picture Neighbors. The film's producers eventually forced Fear off the project, and Belushi got them the infamous SNL gig as compensation. The band's appearance included a group of slam dancers, among them Belushi, Ian MacKaye of Minor Threat (and later Fugazi), Tesco Vee of The Meatmen, Harley Flanagan and John Joseph of the Cro-Mags, and John Brannon of Negative Approach. The show's director, Dave Wilson, originally wanted to prevent the dancers from participating, so Belushi offered to be in the episode if the dancers were allowed to stay. The result was the shortening of Fear's appearance on TV. Frontman Lee Ving started the band's second song by stating, "It's great to be in New Jersey", drawing boos from SNL's New York live audience. Fear played "I Don't Care About You", "Beef Bologna", "New York's Alright If You Like Saxophones", and started to play "Let's Have a War" when the telecast faded into commercial. The slam dancers left ripe pumpkin remains on the set. Cameras, a piano, and other property were damaged in a situation that was close to a stage riot.

After their SNL appearance, which reportedly resulted in $20,000 in damage, some clubs chose not to hire the band. A New York Post article later reported the figure to be $500,000. This is believed to have originated from Ving, who told the Post that "...we caused $500,000 worth of damage, a cool half a million dollars worth of damage, ‘cause we’re professionals, and I counted the damage myself." However, in a more recent interview, Hal Willner stated that the band did not cause any damage to the set, that reports of a riot were overblown, and that the band 'were totally nice people and acted totally professionally'.

Since this incident, Fear has not appeared on Saturday Night Live again.

=== Sinéad O'Connor ===
Sinéad O'Connor tears apart a picture of Pope John Paul II during a live SNL performance.

On October 3, 1992, O'Connor was scheduled to appear, performing an a cappella performance of Bob Marley's "War". During the dress rehearsal of the episode, O'Connor held up a photo of a Balkan child as a protest of child abuse in war before bowing and leaving the stage, which the episode's director Dave Wilson described as a "very tender moment". During the live show, O'Connor changed the "War" lyric "fight racial injustice" to "fight child abuse" as a protest against the then still relatively unknown cases of sexual abuse in the Roman Catholic Church. She presented a photo of Pope John Paul II while singing the word "evil", before tearing the image into pieces and saying "Fight the real enemy!"

NBC had no foreknowledge of O'Connor's plan, and Wilson purposely failed to use the "applause" button, leaving the audience to sit in silence. Tim Robbins, who was the host for that episode and was raised as a devout Catholic, refused to acknowledge O'Connor at the end of the show. NBC received thousands of irate calls in the aftermath of the incident, and protests against O'Connor occurred outside of 30 Rockefeller Plaza, where a steamroller crushed dozens of her tapes, CDs, and LPs. In the following weeks on SNL, Catholic guests Joe Pesci and Madonna both voiced their opposition to O'Connor. The show also aired several sketches mocking O'Connor. She never appeared on Saturday Night Live again prior to her death on July 26, 2023. The incident occurred a full nine years before John Paul II, in a 2001 apology, acknowledged that the sexual abuse within the Church was "a profound contradiction of the teaching and witness of Jesus Christ", followed in 2008 by Pope Benedict XVI apologizing and meeting with victims, speaking of his "shame" at the evil of abuse, calling for perpetrators to be brought to justice, and denouncing mishandling by church authorities.

NBC did not rebroadcast the sequence until 2025, with the exception of an interview with O'Connor on MSNBC's The Rachel Maddow Show, which aired on April 24, 2010, when the clip was aired in full. In reruns, the incident is replaced with the dress rehearsal performance. The original episode was made available on volume four of the DVD special "Saturday Night Live – 25 Years of Music", with an introduction by Michaels about the incident. On February 20, 2011, the clip was aired on the SNL special "Backstage" showing footage of the dress rehearsal and live performance side by side. The footage cuts to interviewees during the moment the photo was ripped. The clip was finally replayed unedited by NBC on the documentary film Ladies & Gentlemen... 50 Years of SNL Music, which premiered January 27, 2025, during a segment about the performance.

The incident was mocked during an episode of the television show 30 Rock (created by former Saturday Night Live head writer Tina Fey) in which it is mentioned that Tracy Jordan, star of TGS (the show's in-universe analogue to Saturday Night Live) tore up a picture of the pope during an episode; it is replied, "In his defense, it was Pope Innocent IV, because he increased taxation in the Papal States." A later episode parodied the Saturday Night Live incident when an NBC page (Kristen Schaal) goes on stage and tears a picture of O'Connor in half.

=== Rage Against the Machine ===
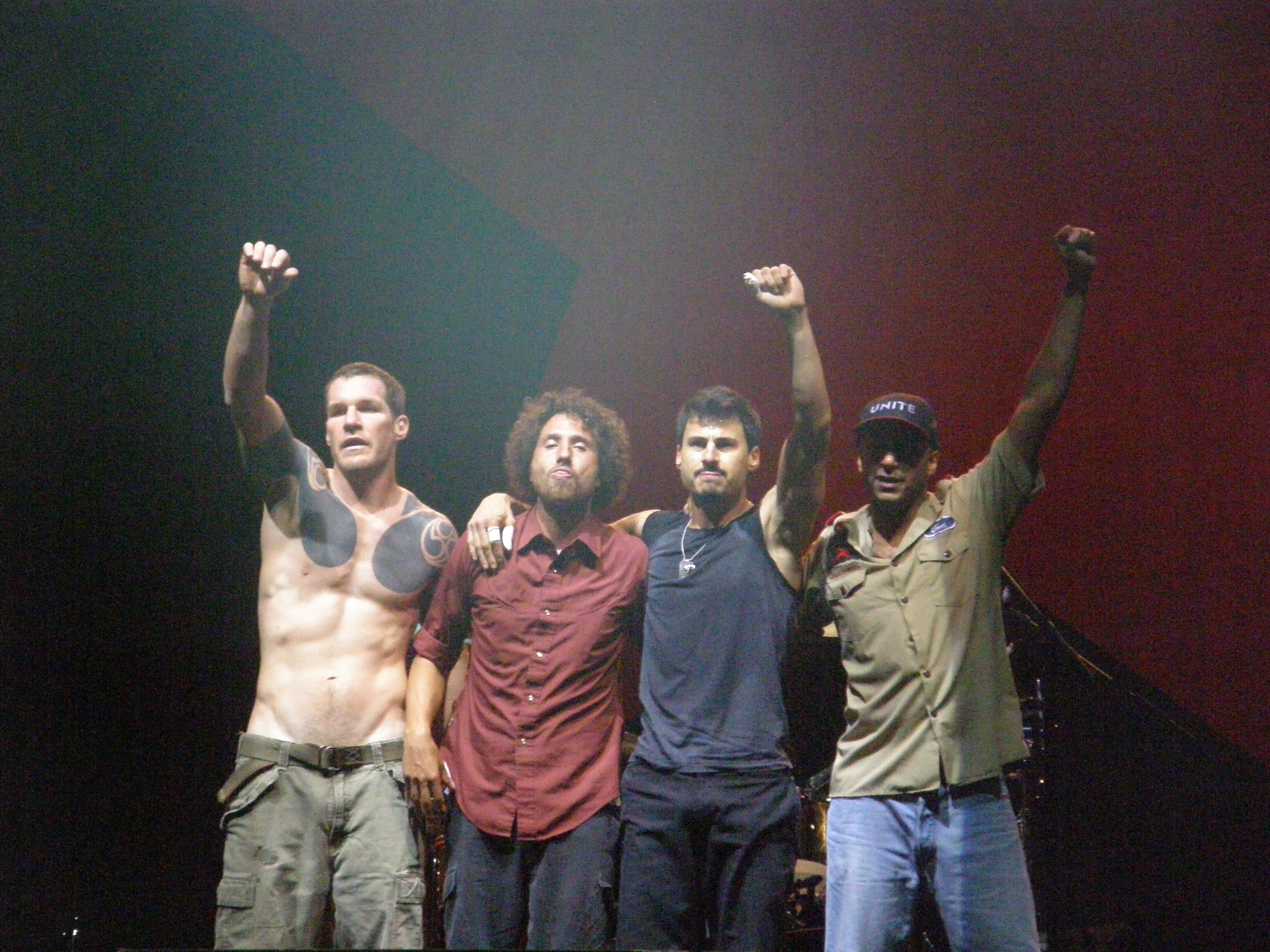
Rage Against the Machine displayed two upside-down American flags.

On April 13, 1996, musical guests Rage Against the Machine (RATM) were scheduled to perform two songs. The show was hosted that night by billionaire and then-presidential candidate Steve Forbes. According to RATM guitarist Tom Morello, "RATM wanted to stand in sharp juxtaposition to a billionaire telling jokes and promoting his flat tax by making our own statement." To this end, the band hung two upside-down American flags from their amplifiers. Seconds before they took the stage to perform "Bulls on Parade", stagehands were sent in to pull the flags down. Following the removal of the flags during the first performance, the band was approached by NBC officials and ordered to immediately leave the building. Upon hearing this, bassist Tim Commerford reportedly stormed Forbes' dressing room, throwing shreds from one of the torn-down flags. Morello said that members of the SNL cast and crew, whom he declined to name, "expressed solidarity with our actions, and a sense of shame that their show had censored the performance." Since this incident, Rage Against the Machine has not appeared on Saturday Night Live again.

=== Ashlee Simpson ===
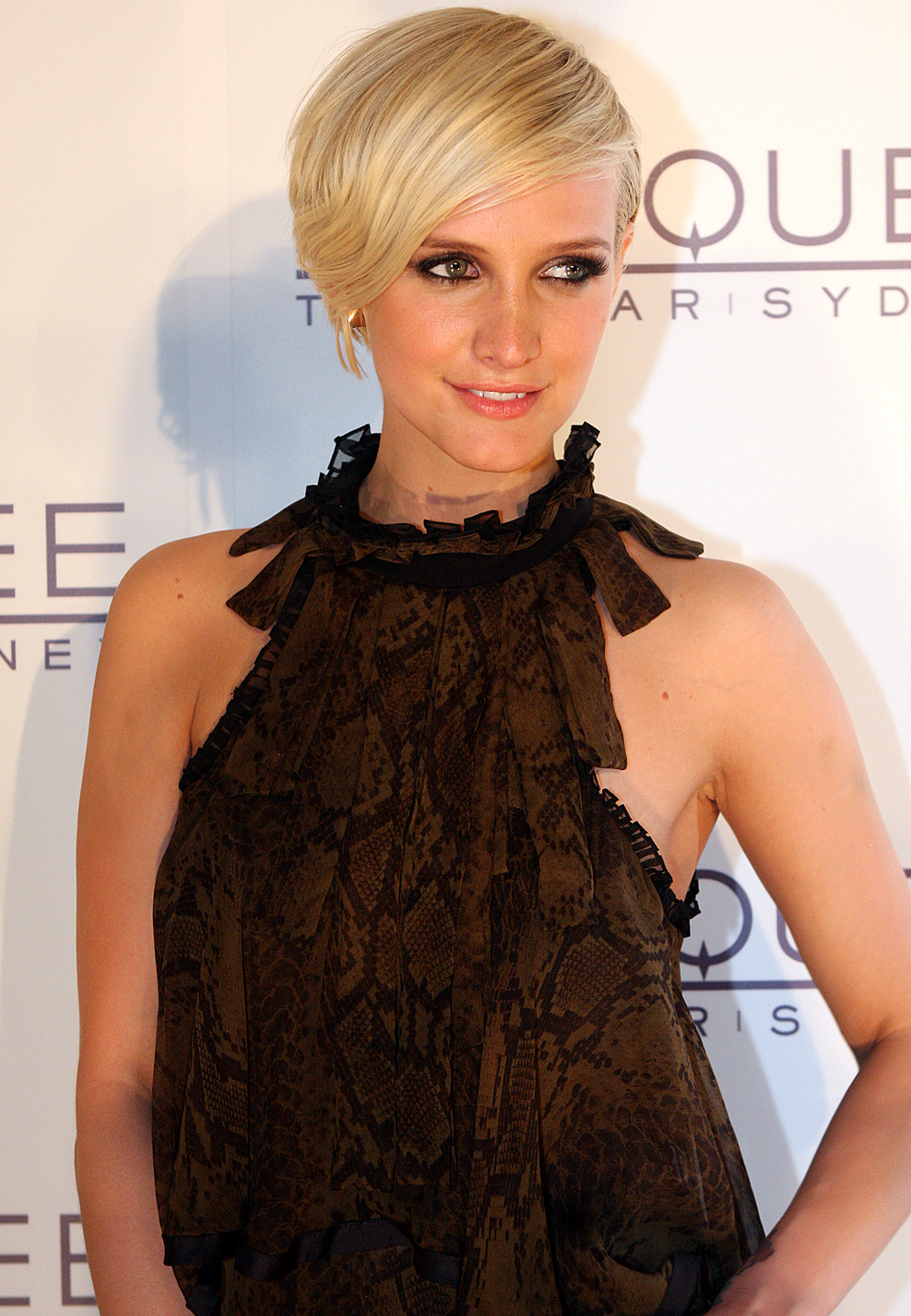
In 2004, Ashlee Simpson was caught lip-syncing during her first appearance as a musical guest.

Singer and actress Ashlee Simpson appeared as a musical guest on the October 23, 2004 episode with Jude Law as host. Her first performance, "Pieces of Me", was performed without incident, but when she began her second song, "Autobiography", the vocals for "Pieces of Me" were heard again, before she had even raised the microphone to her mouth. Simpson began to do an impromptu jig, and then left the stage, prompting the show to quickly cut to commercial. During the closing of the show, Simpson appeared with Law and said: "I feel so bad. My band started playing the wrong song. I didn't know what to do so I thought I'd do a hoedown."

The then-20 year old Simpson was widely attacked following the incident, with over 12,000 mostly negative posts being left on her official website. On October 25, Simpson called into Total Request Live and explained that due to complications arising from severe acid reflux disease, she had completely lost her voice and her doctor had advised her not to sing. Her father and record label reportedly encouraged her to perform using the guide vocals. 60 Minutes cameras, filming the show from backstage for a planned piece on SNL executive producer Lorne Michaels, had also captured Simpson tearfully leaving the stage during an earlier dress rehearsal, upset about her voice. Simpson stated of the incident, "I made a complete fool of myself", and said that the drummer had pressed the wrong button, causing the wrong track to be played. Michaels had been unaware of the plan to use lip synching, and said in the 60 Minutes interview that he would not have allowed it had he been consulted. He also said that it was the first unplanned walk-off in the show's then nearly 30-year history, due to his long-standing policy against improvisation.

Simpson returned to the show in October 2005 and performed without incident. She later reflected on the incident, saying in 2015 on Watch What Happens Live with Andy Cohen that she was "completely" responsible, and that in retrospect, she would not have performed that evening due to the vocal issues. She reiterated these comments in 2024, twenty years after the incident.

=== Kanye West ===
On September 29, 2018, during the end credits, musical guest Kanye West, who wore a "Make America Great Again" hat, launched into a third performance with the song "Ghost Town" featuring Kid Cudi and 070 Shake. Midway through the performance, NBC cut to commercial, as the show had reached the end of its allotted airtime. After finishing the performance, West began pontificating about the "liberal media" attacking President Donald Trump and his own 2020 presidential bid. This resulted in boos from the audience, as the cast stood off to the side of the stage and kept their heads down. The impromptu speech was captured in part by comedian and former SNL cast member Chris Rock. During the rant that was uploaded to Twitter by West's record producer, Mike Dean, West accused the cast and crew of bullying him about supporting Trump.

=== Morgan Wallen ===
On March 29, 2025, after performing two songs earlier in the evening, Morgan Wallen walked off stage after the goodnights. The following morning, he posted a message on Instagram: "Get me to God's Country". Wallen also had dropped out of a pre-taped sketch, allegedly refusing to do it. He was replaced by Joe Jonas.

During host Ryan Gosling's opening monologue on March 7, 2026, musician Harry Styles made a surprise appearance prior to his own hosting duties the following week. Cast member Sarah Sherman quoted the Instagram post live on air, stating: "Harry Styles is here? Get me to God's Country!" before walking over to hit on Styles.

== Other ==
=== Incidents ===
- Herminio Traviesas, a censor who was vice president of the network's Standards and Practices department, objected to cast member Laraine Newman's use of the term "pissed off" in the March 13, 1976, episode with host Anthony Perkins; he was in the process of placing the show on a permanent delay of several seconds, instead of live, but he changed his mind after Newman personally apologized to him.
- A Weekend Update segment on April 24, 1976, that ridiculed actress Claudine Longet, then charged with negligent homicide in Colorado in the shooting death of her boyfriend, warranted an on-air apology by announcer Don Pardo during the following episode.
- On the December 17, 1977 episode hosted by Miskel Spillman (winner of the "Anyone Can Host" contest), Elvis Costello was the musical guest as a last-minute replacement after the Sex Pistols were denied visas to enter the United States as a result of controversy surrounding their music and lyrics. Costello was slated to perform "Less Than Zero" due to pressure from his record company. Costello disagreed, and felt that the song, which was about British Union of Fascists leader Oswald Mosley, would not be understood by an American audience and was too low-key to make much impact. After only a few bars, Costello stopped his band, and said to the audience, "I'm sorry, ladies and gentlemen, but there's no reason to do this song here." The band then began to play "Radio Radio" instead. Off camera, an enraged Michaels reportedly showed Costello his middle finger throughout the song, and Costello was banned from SNL for 12 years. He parodied the incident on the 1999 25th anniversary special by interrupting the Beastie Boys' performance of "Sabotage", which quickly morphed into a joint performance of "Radio Radio" with the Beastie Boys as his backing ensemble.
- The December 15, 1979, episode featured three songs by musical guest David Bowie, concluding with a performance of "Boys Keep Swinging", which used a green screen effect to superimpose Bowie's head on the body of a marionette he operated while singing. Censors muted the lyric "other boys check you out" during the performance, but were unable to react in time when the song concluded with a large phallus repeatedly popping out of the marionette's pants. The episode was not edited further for rebroadcasts. Rolling Stone later ranked Bowie's appearance the seventh best musical performance in SNL history in 2017.
- A stand-up routine by Sam Kinison during the October 18, 1986, episode was edited for the West Coast telecast and later airings, replacing two sections of the routine with a silent image of the previous season's cast. The first cutaway occurred when Kinison encouraged the legalization of cannabis and said: "You can't get any more pot. If you give us back the pot, we'll forget about the crack." The joke violated NBC policy of the time that all references to drugs must be negative. The second, longer cutaway occurred when Kinison made a joke about the Crucifixion. During rehearsal, Kinison had not performed the drug joke and been asked to remove the Crucifixion joke.
- In a December 5, 1992, "Wayne's World" sketch, the characters Wayne and Garth (portrayed by Mike Myers and Dana Carvey) made fun of Chelsea Clinton, daughter of President-elect Bill Clinton. Wayne noted that while "adolescence has been thus far unkind" to the then-twelve-year-old Chelsea, Garth opined that "she could turn into a babe in waiting." First Lady Hillary Clinton was publicly critical of the jokes. "We felt, upon reflection, that if it was in any way hurtful, it wasn't worth it," said executive producer Lorne Michaels. "She's a kid, a kid who didn't choose to be in public life." Myers himself wrote a letter of apology to the White House.
- The 13th episode of SNL's 19th season, aired the weekend before Valentine's Day in 1994, featured a sketch in which host Alec Baldwin portrays a scoutmaster making overt sexual advances towards the Boy Scout character Canteen Boy (played by Adam Sandler). The sketch generated a considerable amount of complaints from viewers, who felt it was homophobic and trivialized pedophilia. Chicago Sun-Times columnist Richard Roeper stated that he received calls from his readers claiming they stopped watching the sketch before it finished, while the Boy Scouts of America said: "We see nothing funny about child molestation, and are surprised that this unfunny subject would be selected for a comedy sketch." Baldwin said that NBC received 300,000 phone call complaints and lost seven affiliates due to the sketch, though this was proven false. Nonetheless, the sketch frequently appears in lists of the most controversial SNL moments, and reruns add a disclaimer that Sandler's character is 27 years old.
- In March 1998, a Robert Smigel animated short film called Conspiracy Theory Rock, a parody of the show Schoolhouse Rock!, aired as part of the TV Funhouse segment. The blatantly political short accused big corporations, including Time Warner, Disney, Fox, Westinghouse, and then-owner of NBC General Electric, of developing a media monopoly to manipulate public perception and conceal questionable actions. The clip aired only once as part of the original SNL episode and was removed from syndicated repeats (thereby ironically seeming to confirm the semi-satirical accusation), with Michaels explaining that it "wasn't funny". The clip was eventually released as part of the Saturday TV Funhouse compilation DVD in 2006.
- The episode hosted by Rainn Wilson, aired on February 24, 2007, featured a sketch entitled "Danny's Song", wherein bar patrons listen to the titular song and reminisce about inappropriate memories. A character played by Bill Hader says his dad "loved this song. I remember we had this one great day at the park. We just had so much fun. He was running in the grass and chasing squirrels. They had this fountain and we threw pennies in it for hours. So great. It was the first day I ever thought to myself just, 'I have a dad', and not, 'I have a dad with Down's syndrome.' [...] He loved crayons." The skit prompted criticism from Jon Colman, the CEO of the National Down Syndrome Society, which led to the words "Down's syndrome" being bleeped in later rebroadcasts.
- The episode hosted by Gal Gadot aired on October 7, 2017, and featured a sketch entitled "Safelite AutoGlass". The sketch drew controversy for a scene in which a Safelite windshield repairman purposely breaks a customer's windshield in order to attempt to flirt with the customer's 17-year-old daughter. The sketch was subsequently pulled from rebroadcasts and the internet. Rebroadcasts replaced the sketch with a previously unaired sketch entitled "The Last Fry".
- The episode hosted by Jonah Hill on November 3, 2018, three days before the 2018 United States elections, featured a Weekend Update segment in which Pete Davidson drew controversy for mocking then-Congressional candidate Dan Crenshaw, a former Navy lieutenant commander who lost his eye in combat in Afghanistan. Davidson compared Crenshaw to "a hit man in a porno movie," adding, "I'm sorry, I know he lost his eye in war or whatever." Crenshaw appeared on Weekend Update during the subsequent episode, where he made jokes at Davidson's expense and delivered a message in support of veterans.
- On September 12, 2019, the night before SNL planned to announce the three new cast members hired for the 45th season, several offensive remarks made by incoming cast member Shane Gillis were made public. Freelance comedy reporter Seth Simons posted clips, since removed from YouTube, of an episode of Matt and Shane's Secret Podcast from 2018 in which Gillis made racist and mocking remarks about Chinese people. A video of the podcast, removed before Gillis's hiring but reposted to Twitter, showed Gillis using racial slurs against Asian people, making derogatory references to the food they eat, and discussing his frustration with their inability to learn English, later referring to it as "good racism". Early in 2019, he called Democratic presidential nominee Andrew Yang a "Jew Chink". Gillis responded to the backlash with what Vox and The Huffington Post characterized as a non-apology. Four days later, on September 16, a spokesperson for Michaels announced that Gillis had been removed from the cast.
- On the February 20, 2021 episode, Weekend Update co-host Michael Che said, "Israel is reporting that they've vaccinated half of their population, and I'm gonna guess it's the Jewish half". This joke was criticized by Israeli officials and by several major U.S. Jewish groups, including the American Jewish Committee, who accused Che's joke of being an antisemitic trope.
- On May 8, 2021, a sketch titled "Gen Z Hospital" that played on popular Internet phrases, derived from African-American Vernacular English was met with criticism by Twitter users calling the show out for poking fun at it. Sketch writer Michael Che responded on Instagram on May 10 writing: "I've been reading about how my 'gen z' sketch was misappropriating AAVE and I was stunned cause what the fuck is 'AAVE'? I had to look it up. Turns out it's an acronym for 'African American vernacular english.' You know, AAVE! That ol' saying that actual black people use in conversation all the time...look, the sketch bombed. I'm used to that. I meant no offense to the 'aave' community. I love aave. Aave to the moon!"
- On October 8, 2022, a sketch generated controversy by ridiculing the Try Guys, a group of Internet content creators. Their fourth member, Ned Fulmer, had recently admitted to an eight-month affair with a lower-ranking employee after being photographed by fans on Reddit. Fulmer's wife, Ariel, who was often mentioned by Ned and had been a frequent guest contributor to the channel, as well as their two children, were heavily supported by the Try Guys and their community; this included Ned's immediate removal from the channel. The sketch, parodying the channel's official response video, prompted outrage from various news outlets and Try Guys fans after portraying the workplace dynamic as an irrelevant consensual relationship. Writer Will Stephen, who had attended Yale University at the same time as Fulmer, was accused in online spaces of writing the sketch with bias and, according to cast member Devon Walker, doxxed. The Try Guys themselves avoided direct commentary on the sketch's contents, with member Keith Habersberger saying that they "never thought [they] were important enough to be ridiculed that way."
- The cold open of the December 9, 2023 episode was a parody of the Congress hearing on antisemitism on college campuses which had taken place earlier in the week. The sketch was criticised by Jewish groups like the ADL for its complacency with antisemitism. Also, former cast member Cecily Strong was set to play Republican congresswoman Elise Stefanik in the sketch, but pulled out before the live show because the content of the sketch made her feel "uncomfortable". Chloe Troast played the role on air.
- On the April 12, 2025 episode, during a sketch parodying The White Lotus, the show received criticism for their portrayal of Aimee Lou Wood, as being depicted with exaggerated teeth, as portrayed by Sarah Sherman. Wood later responded saying it was "unfunny and mean", and adding "Yes, take the piss for sure – that's what the show is about – but there must be a cleverer, more nuanced, less cheap way?". Wood claimed SNL sent her an apology, though TMZ later claimed that the show sent her no formal apology.
  - An April 28, 2026 promotional video for Wood's episode of SNL UK later poked fun at the controversy. Cast members Paddy Young, Ayoade Bamgboye, Al Nash, and Celeste Dring are seen nervously awaiting Wood's arrival, with the latter three covering their mouths. Wood assumes they are wearing fake teeth, but they reveal that they are actually wearing fake mustaches to try and emulate Young's iconic facial hair.
- A sketch cut from the February 28, 2026 episode featured cast members playing "canceled" celebrities, including Andrew Dismukes as Mel Gibson, Kenan Thompson as Bill Cosby and Ashley Padilla as J. K. Rowling, claiming each one had said or done something controversial because of Tourette syndrome. This was in the wake of an incident at the 79th British Academy Film Awards, in which Tourette's activist John Davidson, who lives with the condition, was heard involuntarily shouting racial slurs. The sketch was criticized by the charity Tourette’s Action, with Emma McNally of the organization saying “Mocking a disability is never acceptable. It would not be tolerated for any other condition, and it should not be tolerated by people with Tourette’s.”.

=== On-air profanity ===
- Paul Shaffer accidentally said "fuckin'" instead of "floggin'" during a sketch in 1980. He later recalled that he "went white", and executive producer Michaels told him, "You broke down the last barrier."
- The February 21, 1981, episode hosted by Charlene Tilton featured a parody of the famed "Who shot J.R.?" story arc from the popular soap she starred in, Dallas. During the show, a recurring plotline featured cast member Charles Rocket and Tilton flirting while other cast members expressed jealousy, leading to Rocket being shot in the chest by a sniper in the middle of a sketch. In the show's closing moments, as cast members gathered with the host to say good night, Tilton asked Rocket how he felt about being shot. In character, Rocket replied "Oh man, it's the first time I've ever been shot in my life. I'd like to know who the fuck did it." Director Dave Wilson, upon hearing the profanity, reportedly threw his script down and left the control room, muttering, "Well, that's the end of live television." The incident was cut from the subsequent West Coast broadcast. Rocket later said that he was trying to kill time before the show's close and had not meant to utter the profanity, but the incident later contributed to Rocket's and then–executive producer Jean Doumanian's dismissal from the show.
  - Earlier in the same episode, musical guest Prince sang the lyric "Fightin' war is such a fuckin' bore" during his performance of "Partyup". This, however, went largely unnoticed at the time, as then–SNL censor William Clotworthy misheard the word as "friggin'" and took no action.
- On October 21, 1995 – In a sketch where she plays the mom of host David Schwimmer, Cheri Oteri gets her dress caught in a goalie net to then ad-lib the line,“Look at this shit.”. During the goodnights at the end of the show, in front of the entire cast, Schwimmer forced Oteri to put a quarter in a swear jar.
- During an April 12, 1997 Weekend Update story about Tabitha Soren, anchor Norm Macdonald appeared to cough and choke momentarily, causing him to pause and then mutter, "What the fuck was that?" The audience applauded, and Macdonald laughed the error away, saying at one point that he hoped everyone was enjoying "my farewell performance" and, in closing, "Maybe we'll see you next week". He was fired at the start of January 1998, partly because of this incident and partly (according to NBC's management, and disputed by much of the cast) due to a "drop in ratings and general reduction of quality." Macdonald and others believed that the real reason for his dismissal was the inclusion of a series of jokes calling O. J. Simpson a murderer during and after his double murder trial in Los Angeles. NBC Entertainment president Don Ohlmeyer was good friends with Simpson, and had thrown a party for the jurors who acquitted Simpson after the trial. The jokes were written primarily by Macdonald and longtime SNL writer Jim Downey, who was fired from SNL outright at the same time. Downey was re-hired in 2000. Macdonald was replaced on Weekend Update by Colin Quinn, beginning on the January 10, 1998 episode. Macdonald's firing was widely criticized, most notably by comedian Chevy Chase, who is widely credited with originating Weekend Update. Chase argued that Macdonald's "time in the chair [was] among the funniest and [most] well-written of all the Weekend Update stints".
- While performing their single "B.Y.O.B." on May 7, 2005, System of a Down's Daron Malakian exclaimed "fuck yeah". The band had previously refused to self-censor their performance, leading NBC censors to mute "fuck" each time it was sung, but they missed Malakian's impromptu yell. It was edited out of the West Coast and other subsequent telecasts of the show.
- On September 26, 2009, Jenny Slate made her SNL debut in a "biker babes" sketch alongside Kristen Wiig and actress Megan Fox in which their characters repeatedly use the word "frickin'". In one instance Slate accidentally said "fuckin'" instead, which was dubbed over with "freakin'" for subsequent airings. Slate was "pulled back" in subsequent episodes.
- On December 15, 2012, actor Samuel L. Jackson, appearing on the recurring Kenan Thompson sketch "What Up with That?" as a talk show guest whose segment was cut for time, exclaimed what sounded like the words "fuck" and "bullshit". Thompson ad-libbed in response, "C'mon, Sam, that costs money!" Jackson later claimed he had not said the full word "fuck" and that Thompson was supposed to cut him off before he swore.
- On March 12, 2016, Ariana Grande uttered the word "shit" during her opening monologue. The profanity was "expected" to be edited out of the West Coast broadcast, but was not.
- On November 12, 2016, host Dave Chappelle deliberately used the words "goddamn" and "nigger" throughout his monologue and in several sketches. Although NBC did not censor Chappelle, Raleigh affiliate WRAL-TV, which had only joined the network earlier in the year, did so, as it found airing profanity to be in violation of its own policy.
- On February 4, 2017, host Kristen Stewart said that hosting the show was "the coolest fucking thing ever" during her opening monologue. Stewart realized her mistake, apologized and joked that she would never be invited back. She hosted again on November 2, 2019.
- On January 13, 2018, host Sam Rockwell accidentally said "you can't be this fucking stupid" while in character as a frustrated children's television host reminiscent of Mr. Wizard.
  - In the same episode, Weekend Update co-anchor Colin Jost said the word "shithole", directly quoting President Donald Trump's comments about "shithole countries" despite NBC asking him to say "s-hole". He followed the expletive with a sarcastic "oops". Both incidents were censored for the West Coast broadcast of the show.
- On December 21, 2019, Eddie Murphy accidentally said "shit" and then covered his mouth in the "Holiday Baking Championship" sketch. The expletive was muted on the West Coast broadcast, and in reruns.
- On the April 5, 2025 Weekend Update segment, Ego Nwodim performed a faux stand-up act to pitch herself as the replacement for Amber Ruffin as host of the White House Correspondents' Association Dinner, using her stand-up persona "Ms. Eggy". During a portion about Cory Booker's marathon speech on the Senate floor, she performed a call-and-response where she faux-prompted the audience with "These men ain't what?" The audience were not expected to say anything, with the intended punchline being their silence and Nwodim finishing the sentence with "worth a damn." However, the audience instead shouted the word "shit" in unison, to the visible shock of Jost, Michael Che, and Nwodim, who ad-libbed that the audience would be fined and that "Lorne gonna be mad at y'all!" The on-air expletive was censored on rebroadcast and in clips later posted online. Nwodim returned for the season finale to reprise the "Ms. Eggy" persona for a rant about airplane food. Jost introduced her with, "You know her, you love her, you got her fined by the FCC..." According to Nwodim, neither she nor producer Lorne Michaels have actually paid an FCC fine for the incident.
- On the October 18, 2025 episode, Sabrina Carpenter sang the uncensored version of her song "Nobody's Son", in which she says "fucked me up" twice. The profanity was not censored, except on broadcasts by some NBC affiliates on the West Coast.
- On October 10, 2026, during a sketch parodying Dr. Seuss’ Green Eggs and Ham, Shane Gillis accidentally inserted “fucking” into an exclamation directed at Andrew Dismukes, who was in character as Sam-I-am. Gillis, portraying the book’s protagonist’s son Zackary, immediately followed this expletive with a sheepish “geez,” and wave to the audience. At the end of the sketch, Mikey Day, as Zackary’s father, kicks Zackary out shouting “you’re a loser, and you said a bad word!” Gillis later apologized during the goodnights. The profanity was censored on the West Coast and internationally.

=== Banned performers ===
The following performers have reportedly been banned from either hosting or performing on Saturday Night Live mostly due to being badly rehearsed, going off-script (against Michaels' wishes), camera-mugging, not getting along with the cast and crew, or other inappropriate behavior.

- Frank Zappa was banned after his 1978 episode for doing a "disastrous job of hosting the show", mugging for the camera, and even announcing to the audience that he was reading from cue cards.

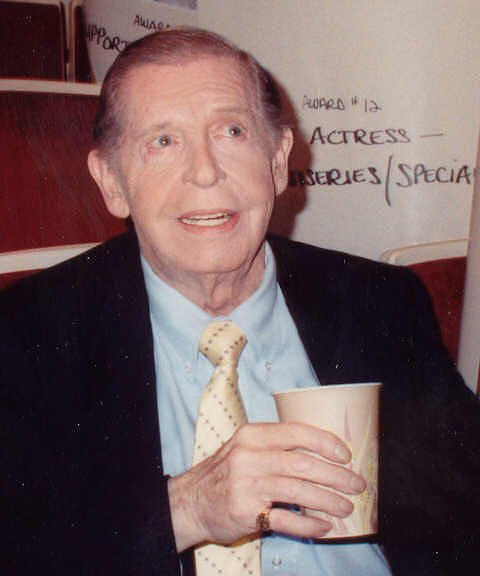
Milton Berle was allegedly banned from hosting again after Michaels thought his episode brought down the show's reputation.

- On April 14, 1979, Milton Berle guest-hosted the program. Berle's long reputation for taking control of an entire television production—whether invited to do so or not—was a cause of major on-set stress. Rosie Shuster, an SNL writer, described the rehearsals for the Berle episode, and the telecast, as "watching a comedy train accident in slow motion on a loop." Upstaging, camera mugging, doing spit-takes, inserting old comedy bits, and climaxing the show with a maudlin performance of "September Song" complete with a pre-arranged standing ovation (something producer Lorne Michaels had never sanctioned) resulted in Berle being banned from hosting the show again. The episode was not rerun until 2003, because Michaels thought it brought down the show's reputation.
- In 1982, Robert Blake was banned after taking a script, crumpling it up, and throwing it into the face of cast member and writer Gary Kroeger.
- In 1986, The Replacements were banned after they came out drunk during their performance of "Bastards of Young" and later appeared in each other's clothes during the second performance. However, Paul Westerberg later went solo and was allowed to appear. The band did not perform again on any NBC television program until 2014, when they appeared on The Tonight Show Starring Jimmy Fallon.
- Steven Seagal was banned after hosting in 1991. Lorne Michaels called him the "worst host ever" and difficult to work with. In an episode the following year, host Nicolas Cage lamented during his monologue that the audience might think he's the biggest jerk who's ever been on the show, Michaels responded "No, no. That would be Steven Seagal."
- A portion of Martin Lawrence's February 19, 1994 monologue concerning menstruation was removed from all repeats and replaced with a voice-over and intertitles stating that the excised portion "...was a frank and lively presentation, and nearly cost us all our jobs." Lawrence also made references to genitalia when he talked about the John and Lorena Bobbitt incident. This led to Lawrence being subsequently banned from ever hosting, appearing, or even being mentioned on the show,
- Original Weekend Update anchor Chevy Chase's issues with cast members and writers led to his being the only SNL alum banned from the show. While he had fought Bill Murray during his time as a cast member, and insulted Robert Downey Jr. and Terry Sweeney when returning as a guest host in 1985, the ban came in 1997 after he harassed women on the show, including Cheri Oteri, whom he hit on the back of the head. The ban only appears to be limited to hosting, however, as Chase participated in sketches and specials since 1997.
- In 2003, Adrien Brody introduced musical guest Sean Paul while wearing fake dreadlocks and speaking in fake Jamaican Patois for 45 seconds, prompting Michaels to allegedly ban him. It was previously thought to be an ad-lib, but was later revealed to have been rehearsed.

=== Technical issues ===
- On the October 25, 2014 episode hosted by Jim Carrey, MØ featured as a special guest on musical guest Iggy Azalea's performance of "Beg For It". The performance was however plagued by technical issues that caused latency to MØ's vocals, resulting in her being out of time with the backing track during the live show, and affecting her performance. After viewer criticism, MØ apologised on Twitter the following day for the technical issues and praised Azalea and her team.
- On the May 22, 2021 episode, rapper Lil Nas X had a wardrobe malfunction during the conclusion of his song "Montero (Call Me by Your Name)" in which his pants ripped. He later denied allegations that the incident was a publicity stunt.
- On the December 10, 2022 episode, a technical malfunction led to audio sync issues for much of the first part of the live show, including during the cold open and monologue with hosts Steve Martin and Martin Short. The issue affected the broadcast nationwide, but was rectified about a minute into the monologue.
- Technical issues afflicted the latter portion of the October 12, 2024 episode, hosted by Ariana Grande, with musical guest Stevie Nicks, which was also delayed by six minutes owing to NBC's coverage of Ohio State-Oregon on Big Ten Saturday Night. A malfunctioning sound board caused Nicks' second song to be delayed - following another set of commercials - which resulted in one sketch ("Cinema Classics", with Grande due to portray Judy Garland) being dropped and replaced by another ("Hotel Detective", recorded - and initially cut - at dress-rehearsal) with a shorter runtime.

=== Plagiarism allegations ===
- The sketch "O'Callahan & Son Pub", aired March 18, 1995, on the episode hosted by Paul Reiser, was entirely lifted by cast member and writer Jay Mohr from a standup routine by comedian Rick Shapiro. During rehearsal three weeks later, Mohr was brought to Michaels and shown a tape of Shapiro's act. Mohr denied any knowledge of Shapiro or his act at the time, but later admitted in his memoir that he had stolen the sketch word for word from Shapiro's work. Shapiro and his manager sued the show and gained an undisclosed settlement, which included the removal of the sketch from all reruns of the show.
- "Ladies Who Lunch," a sketch that aired on the September 25, 2010, episode hosted by Amy Poehler, was deemed similar to the Tim and Eric Awesome Show, Great Job! segment "Tiny Hats." Both Tim Heidecker and Eric Wareheim jokingly tweeted links to the video. Heidecker told Vulture that "I watched it this morning, and found it to be very similar to our sketch, surprisingly similar," while noting it also could have been coincidental.
- The sketch "River Sisters," aired on the October 4, 2014 episode hosted by Sarah Silverman, was accused of plagiarizing "Rollin'", a similar sketch performed by the Los Angeles improvisation group the Groundlings.
- A May 9, 2015 sketch showed a contestant on a Win, Lose or Draw-style game show panicking at being asked to draw the Muslim prophet Muhammad. Viewers compared the sketch to a "strikingly similar" January 2015 sketch on the Canadian sketch comedy series This Hour Has 22 Minutes, igniting allegations of plagiarism.

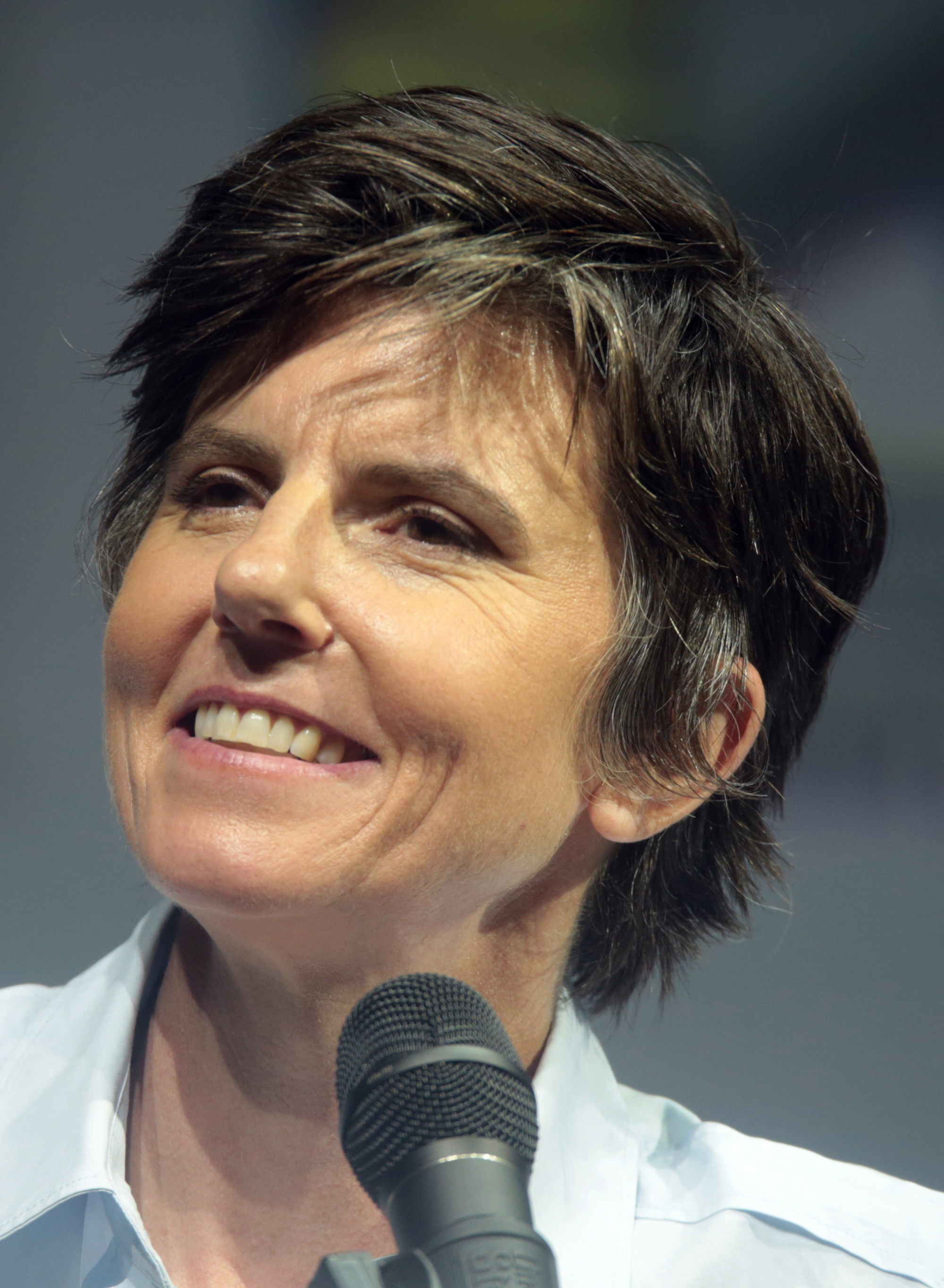
Tig Notaro accused the show of plagiarising a short film she had created.

- On the April 8, 2017 episode hosted by Louis C.K., a sketch aired in which a man, played by C.K., hires a clown (Bobby Moynihan) to perform at a birthday party at which he is the sole audience member. Comedian Tig Notaro accused the show's writers of plagiarizing her short film Clown Service. Notaro further claimed that a writer who was aware of Clown Service worked on Birthday Clown, and that Notaro and C.K. had not spoken for over a year.
- The founders of the sketch comedy troupe Temple Horses alleged that two sketches from season 44, "The Pumpkin Patch" from the October 13, 2018, episode hosted by Awkwafina and "Pound Puppy" from the February 16, 2019, episode hosted by Don Cheadle, were plagiarized from their own earlier sketches "Pet Blinders" and "Not Trying to Fuck This Pumpkin," uploaded to YouTube in 2011 and 2014 respectively. In a statement to Variety, troupe member Ryan Hoffman said, "Imagine, one day you come home and it looks like somebody's robbed your house, what do you want from that situation? We feel like somebody took our stuff, and this isn't the kind of thing where you can just get it back or call your insurance company to have it replaced, so at this point we're just speaking out about it." They said an NBC attorney had told them that an internal investigation found that the SNL writers had come up with the ideas independently.
- The October 1, 2022 season 48 premiere, hosted by Miles Teller, featured a sketch titled "Charmin Bears" centered around a family of bears, as seen in the television commercials for Charmin toilet paper. The plot consisted of the son of the family breaking the news to his parents that he was uninterested in pursuing a bathroom related higher education and would rather become a dancer instead. The sketch was singled out as being similar in concept to an animated short by YouTuber Joel Haver, which was uploaded July 14, 2022, in which a young Charmin bear tries to convince his parents to let him pursue an education in theater or dancing rather than the toilet paper focused family business. Haver responded to the sketch in a video posted October 3, 2022 in which he encouraged his audience to give SNL's writers the benefit of the doubt and chalked up the similarities to parallel thinking. Haver also explicitly requested of series creator Lorne Michaels that no negative consequences befall the writer of the sketch before taking the opportunity to shine a spotlight on some smaller creators.

== Bibliography ==
- Miller, James Andrew; Shales, Tom (2014). Live From New York: The Complete, Uncensored History of Saturday Night Live as Told by Its Stars, Writers, and Guests. New York: Little, Brown and Company. ISBN 978-0-316295-04-8.
- Murphy, Caryn (2013). "'Is This the Era of the Woman?': SNL's Gender Politics in the New Millennium". In Marx, Nick; Sienkiewicz, Matt; Becker, Ron (eds.). Saturday Night Live and American TV. Bloomington, Indiana: Indiana University Press. pp. 173–190. ISBN 978-0-253-01090-2. JSTOR j.ctt16gznsz.
- Vesey, Alexandra (2013). "Live Music: Mediating Musical Performance and Discord on Saturday Night Live". In Marx, Nick; Sienkiewicz, Matt; Becker, Ron (eds.). Saturday Night Live and American TV. Bloomington, Indiana: Indiana University Press. pp. 112–129. ISBN 978-0-253-01090-2. JSTOR j.ctt16gznsz.
