= Weekend Update =

Saturday Night Live parody newscast

Current intertitle for the program

Weekend Update is a Saturday Night Live sketch and satirical news program that comments on and parodies current events. It is the show's longest-running recurring sketch, having been on since the show's first broadcast and been featured in the vast majority of episodes since. It is typically presented in the middle of the show immediately after the first musical performance, and with some exceptions is the only sketch not to feature the episode's host.

The format of the sketch involves one or two of the players cast in the role of news anchor, presenting news headlines based on current events that are immediately followed by a gag commentary that twists the context into something humorous. The anchors also act as hosts for occasional editorials, commentaries, or other performances by other cast members or guests, either playing fictionalized versions of themselves, impressions of real-life figures, or invented characters; these guests often display eccentric behavior and baffling commentaries, with the anchors acting as straight people reacting accordingly.

In modern times, dedicated anchors are chosen among writing staff, often lead writers, in lieu of cast or featured players, although anchors still occasionally appear in other sketches. Chevy Chase, the original cast member filling the role of the anchor, has said that Weekend Update paved the way for comedic news shows like The Daily Show and The Colbert Report, and several Weekend Update hosts have gone on to host their own late-night talk shows, most notably fellow NBC properties Late Night (Jimmy Fallon and Seth Meyers) and The Tonight Show (Fallon). The current hosts of the segment are writing staff members and former lead writers Colin Jost and Michael Che; they also hold the longest tenures of any Weekend Update host, with Jost beating out Che by eight episodes.

== History ==
=== Weekend Update (1975–1981) ===
==== Chevy Chase (1975–1976) ====
Weekend Update was created by original anchor Chevy Chase and SNL writers Herb Sargent and Al Franken. The sketch appeared on the first SNL broadcast on October 11, 1975, as the weekly "Update" to NBC News' monthly news magazine "Weekend", hence "Weekend Update". Chase popularized several catchphrases during the segment, such as his "I'm Chevy Chase... and you're not" greeting; and his repeated announcement that "Generalissimo Francisco Franco is still dead". Weekend Update segments frequently opened with Chase having an intimate conversation with someone on the phone, unaware he was "on the air". Chase ended Weekend Update with what became its signature catchphrase: "That's the news...good night, and have a pleasant tomorrow."

In addition, Garrett Morris parodied the practice of a picture insert of a person delivering the news in sign language for the hearing impaired. Chase would announce, "...and now, I shall repeat the top news story, assisted by the President of the Society for The Hard of Hearing." Chase would then repeat the story while Morris simply cupped his mouth and yelled the headline.

==== Jane Curtin (1976–1980) ====
Jane Curtin substituted for Chase during Season 2 for a few shows due to Chase's injury. Subsequently, she replaced him when he left in the fall of 1976. Curtin stayed as anchor until the end of Season 5 in 1980. She finished Season 2 solo but was then paired with co-anchors Dan Aykroyd (1977–1978) and Bill Murray (1978–1980), with Aykroyd being "promoted" to "Station Manager" in September 1978.

A frequent feature of Weekend Update during this time was "Point/Counterpoint", a send-up of the then-current 60 Minutes segment of the same name with James J. Kilpatrick and Shana Alexander. SNL's version featured Curtin and Aykroyd as debaters, with each making personal attacks on the other and their positions; a common pattern had Aykroyd announcing the topic, followed by Curtin making an opening statement, with Aykroyd retorting "Jane, you ignorant slut" and Curtin replying "Dan, you pompous ass".

Other popular guests during Curtin's tenure as anchor included John Belushi and Gilda Radner's characters Emily Litella and Roseanne Roseannadanna. During Curtin's tenure as host, she opened each Weekend Update segment with Roger Grimsby's "Here now, the news" sign-on, and closed with Chase's "That's the news. Goodnight and have a pleasant tomorrow".

==== Charles Rocket (1980–1981) ====
Charles Rocket (later teamed with Gail Matthius) anchored during the one-season (1980–1981) tenure of new executive producer Jean Doumanian. Rocket is notable as being the only Weekend Update anchor to have experience as a real news anchor, having served as anchorman at KOAA-TV in Pueblo, Colorado, under his birth name Charles Claverie and WTVF in Nashville under the name Charles Kennedy.

Rocket's final appearance was on the penultimate episode of the season, airing on March 7, 1981, and hosted by Bill Murray. For that episode, Weekend Update received a one-time name and set change to "Saturday Night NewsLine" and featured three segments: science edition, hosted by Dr. Jonathan Lear (Mark King), arts and leisure correspondent Bill Murray, and news by Rocket. Rocket signed off each week by saying "Good night and watch out."

Prior to the final episode of the season, Jean Doumanian and most of the cast, including Rocket, were fired. Chase hosted the last episode and anchored Weekend Update, as he had on his previous appearances as host.

=== "SNL NewsBreak" (1981–1982) ===
The anchor position changed hands frequently under Dick Ebersol, executive producer of SNL from 1981 to 1985. Brian Doyle-Murray was teamed first with Mary Gross, then going solo for three months, then back with Gross for one more month before finally being teamed with Christine Ebersole for the remainder of the season. Doyle-Murray signed off each week with "Good night, and good news."

=== "Saturday Night News" (1982–1985) ===
Brad Hall took over the desk of the retitled "Saturday Night News" in 1982 through most of the 1983 season. By the 1983 season, he began signing out with phrase "Thanks for coming out in the rain!" Hall was removed from the anchor position halfway through the 1983–84 season. For the rest of the season, and into the next, there were no regular anchors—both cast members and SNL guest-hosts took turns at the chair (Hall himself left the show at the end of the 1983–1984 season). In December 1984, Christopher Guest became the new anchor. However, within this period, the SNL broadcast of December 8, 1984, is the only episode to not feature the satirical news segment on the show, at all.

=== Weekend Update (1985–present) ===
==== Dennis Miller (1985–1991) ====
In 1985, Lorne Michaels returned to produce the show, bringing the Weekend Update name back with him. The new anchor was Dennis Miller, who remained in the chair for six years, the longest run for a solo Weekend Update anchor. Miller opened the segments by saying "Good evening, and what can I tell ya?" and signed off by saying "Guess what, folks? That's the news, and I am outta here!" He would then scribble nonsense on his script, sometimes throwing it into the air. Miller left SNL in 1991. Dana Carvey did a memorable mockery of Miller anchoring during this period, to the point Carvey's impersonation would itself become another character, being further impersonated by Tom Hanks simply dressing as Miller and clucking like a chicken.

During many of his Weekend Update segments, Miller was joined by The Weekend Update Dancers and A. Whitney Brown for his commentary "The Big Picture".

==== Kevin Nealon (1991–1994) ====
Kevin Nealon took over with his "Mr. Subliminal" character and as the straight man in many highlights such as "Operaman" and "Cajun Man" (with both characters being played by Adam Sandler) and also for Chris Farley's "Bennett Brauer" character. Nealon had a three-year stint at the Update desk before requesting his departure, as he felt his time behind the desk was drawing away from other acting opportunities on the show. Nealon signed off with the tagline "I'm Kevin Nealon, and that's news to me".

==== Norm Macdonald (1994–1997) ====
Norm Macdonald, whom Chase called "the only other guy who did [the segment] funny", took over the role for Season 20. Al Franken, whose history with SNL dated back to 1975, had been lobbying to replace Nealon as Weekend Update host. Accordingly, Franken left the show after losing the anchor spot. Although Nealon no longer anchored Weekend Update, he still remained on the show until the end of Season 20. Macdonald would open each segment with "I'm Norm Macdonald, and now the fake news."

Running gags by Macdonald included punchlines involving Frank Stallone and Germans loving David Hasselhoff. In his last two seasons, he introduced another recurring gag where he would read a news story and then record a "note to self" on a tape recorder regarding the story he had just read. One of the most frequent guest correspondents during Macdonald's run was Joe Blow (played by Colin Quinn), a blue-collar guy who would rant about things that bother him. He would often make Macdonald uncomfortable and always ask when they were "gonna go for a beer together", to which Macdonald would always end up turning him down. His sign off was frequently "And that's the way it is", emulating Walter Cronkite's famous sign-off phrase.

Another common topic of Macdonald's jokes was O. J. Simpson after his arrest and trial for murder. For example, he joked that "A down-and-out O. J. Simpson ... has decided to go back to doing what he does best: killing people," and upon Simpson's acquittal he declared "well, it is finally official: murder is legal in the state of California." SNL writer Jim Downey recalled that "we did, like three solid years of, like, 60 shows of O.J. jokes in a row." Macdonald made his final appearance as Weekend Update anchor in December 1997, after NBC executive Don Ohlmeyer—a longtime friend of Simpson, who had previously told Michaels to not let his friendship affect the show—demanded Macdonald's dismissal from the segment, despite Michaels's protest that making the change in the middle of the season would be difficult for the show. Ohlmeyer told Macdonald that he was fired because he was not funny.

==== Colin Quinn (1998–2000) ====
Macdonald was replaced by Colin Quinn, who started on the first episode after Macdonald had been removed and served through the 1999–2000 season. His first edition of Weekend Update began with "Have you ever gone to a bar and found that your favorite bartender was replaced with a guy named Steve?" He would pause for a beat before continuing, "Well, I'm Steve; what can I get you?" His sign-off, borrowing from a Collin Raye song, was "I'm Colin Quinn, that's my story and I'm sticking to it!"

For the first half of the 1998–1999 season, Quinn would do a pre-desk monologue, where he would provide commentary and rant about the week's biggest news stories. This feature was discontinued after the January 16, 1999, episode.

Quinn stepped down from Weekend Update after 1999–2000, when he left SNL at the end of the season. He anchored the segment for two-and-a-half seasons.

==== Jimmy Fallon and Tina Fey (2000–2004) ====
Over the summer of 2000, cast members auditioned to be replacements. Among the candidates were stand-up comics Kevin Brennan and Jeffrey Ross plus two duos: Ana Gasteyer with Chris Parnell, and Jimmy Fallon with writer Tina Fey. The latter duo was chosen, and they made their first on-air appearance that October. Fallon ended each Weekend Update sketch by throwing his pencil at the camera and cheering if he managed to hit it. Fey often signed off with Chase and Curtin's "Good night, and have a pleasant tomorrow".

Recurring features of the Fallon/Fey era included the "Update Door", a door on the left of the set where celebrities, as impersonated by SNL cast members (and at one time the Land Shark) would walk through to do a commentary—a segment called "Terrible ReEnactments", in which Chris Kattan would do an intentionally bad re-enactment of a news story that had occurred during the week (usually the story involved a celebrity being injured); and regular appearances from Jeff Richards's Drunk Girl character.

Chris Parnell announced the intro for the first season. He was then followed by future Update co-anchor Amy Poehler.

==== Tina Fey and Amy Poehler (2004–2006) ====
Fallon left to pursue a film career in 2004, and was replaced by fellow cast member Amy Poehler as co-anchor, giving the sketch its first two-woman anchor team. Fallon became the announcer for the Weekend Update intro for the next few seasons.

The 2005–2006 season began with Poehler returning to her seat behind the desk.

The segment is featured in the 2006 film Man of the Year in which Robin Williams appears on Weekend Update alongside Poehler and Fey.

==== Amy Poehler and Horatio Sanz (2005) ====
Fey temporarily left the show after giving birth to her first child and was replaced briefly by Horatio Sanz as co-anchor (Sanz wore horn-rimmed glasses during Fey's absence). Fey returned to the show in October for the season's third live episode.

==== Amy Poehler and Seth Meyers (2006–2008) ====
After the departure of Fey, Poehler continued as co-anchor along with new co-anchor Seth Meyers for the 2006–2007 season. The duo began a string of running gags, including "Really!?! with Seth and Amy", in which the pair lambast celebrities for lack of common sense. Poehler left SNL in fall 2008 to give birth to her first child.

During the 2007–2008 season, two previous hosts returned to the Weekend Update desk for one-off appearances–Chevy Chase, as "Senior Political Correspondent" and Tina Fey, as "Special Women's News Correspondent". Women's News was a running segment during the Fey/Poehler era. Alaska Governor Sarah Palin also appeared on Weekend Update once during the 2008–09 season and ended the segment with the traditional "Good night and have a pleasant tomorrow", as Poehler had left her seat to perform a "Sarah Palin rap".

==== Seth Meyers (2008–2013) ====
Beginning October 25, 2008, Meyers anchored the segment alone with Poehler still being credited, but not appearing. On December 6, 2008, Poehler returned, four weeks after the birth of her child, to do Weekend Update with Meyers, but on the December 13, 2008, Weekend Update she announced to the audience that the show was her last one.

After that, Meyers continued anchoring Weekend Update solo. The "Really!?!" celebrity-mocking gag (retitled "Really!?! with Seth") remained, featuring various hosts and guests including Tracy Morgan and Jerry Seinfeld in March 2009 and Kermit the Frog in November 2011. In May 2010, Poehler returned to do it once more, alongside Tina Fey as well.

A running gag of this era was Bobby Moynihan's portrayal of Snooki from Jersey Shore. Moynihan displays a certain attraction to Meyers, who makes fun of the general attitude of the cast members of Jersey Shore as well as Snooki's own personal attributes. Another popular segment was city correspondent Stefon, played by Bill Hader.

During his time in office, New York Governor David Paterson (played by Fred Armisen) often appeared as a guest on the segment, and which often featured jokes about Paterson's blindness and his apparent hatred for the state of New Jersey. In the premiere episode of SNL's 36th season, Paterson himself made a guest appearance on Weekend Update next to Armisen. Amy Poehler, who had returned to host the episode, co-anchored Weekend Update as she traditionally did before her departure.

On the December 17, 2011, episode, which was hosted by Jimmy Fallon, multiple former anchors returned for a "Weekend Update Joke-Off". Along with Meyers, the anchors included Fallon, Poehler, and Fey.

Entertainment Weekly confirmed that Amy Poehler would appear on Saturday Night Live Weekend Update Thursday for at least two broadcasts as co-anchor in fall 2009. For the third episode of Weekend Update Thursday, Seth Meyers anchored solo. After each episode, the anchor(s) would throw to Parks and Recreation. Lorne Michaels had stated that there would be six more episodes of Weekend Update Thursday; however, the spring 2010 episodes were scrapped.

Poehler returned on both the February 18, 2012, and May 18, 2013, episodes to perform "Really!?! with Seth and Amy" twice more. In both instances, Meyers asked her if she would like to co-anchor with him again for the rest of that segment; he was barely able to finish asking before she accepted.

In the February 16, 2025, SNL50: The Anniversary Special, Meyers returned to anchor one section of Weekend Update, reuniting with longtime Meyers guest, Fred Armisen, who, alongside Vanessa Bayer, reprised their recurring Update roles as "best friends from growing up".

==== Seth Meyers and Cecily Strong (2013–2014) ====
On May 12, 2013, NBC announced that Seth Meyers would become the new host of Late Night in 2014, succeeding Jimmy Fallon, who would take over as the new host of The Tonight Show. In September 2013, Lorne Michaels confirmed that Meyers, who would stay on at SNL for at least the first half of the show's 39th season, would be joined at the Weekend Update anchor desk by a new co-anchor, Cecily Strong, beginning with the show's season premiere on September 28, 2013. Strong, who joined SNL the previous season and had been upgraded to repertory status in the cast for her sophomore season, was no stranger to the segment, making visits to the Weekend Update desk as her recurring character "The Girl You Wish You Hadn't Started a Conversation with at a Party". Michaels, who also produces Late Night, hinted at Meyers potentially dropping in as Weekend Update co-anchor, noting that Meyers's Late Night will not tape on Friday nights. Meyers and Strong sign off with "For 'Weekend Update', I'm Seth Meyers!" "And I'm Cecily Strong, good night!" before performing a fist bump or blowing kisses to the audience.

On February 1, 2014, Meyers performed his final episode of SNL and was joined at the Weekend Update desk by Strong, Poehler, Hader in character as Stefon, Andy Samberg, and Armisen as Governor Paterson.

==== Cecily Strong and Colin Jost (2014) ====
SNL writer Colin Jost replaced Meyers as co-anchor of Weekend Update beginning with the March 1 episode, which was hosted by Jim Parsons. For the duration of this tenure, Strong stayed to the right side while Jost went to the left. Strong led off each broadcast except for the May 3, 2014, episode hosted by Andrew Garfield, when Jost led off.

==== Colin Jost and Michael Che (2014–present) ====
Comedian and SNL writer Michael Che replaced Cecily Strong beginning with the season 40 premiere, hosted by Chris Pratt. Che's pairing with Colin Jost is the first in which both anchors are male. Che is also the first African-American Weekend Update anchor. As of the 2024–25 season, Jost and Che are the longest tenured Update anchors in the show's history, with Jost becoming the longest running Weekend Update anchor on October 23, 2021, and Che rising to second place on January 29, 2022.

Che led off the broadcast on his premiere episode. Starting with the October 4, 2014, episode hosted by Sarah Silverman, each anchor tells at least one extended joke per segment.

So far, this era features many appearances from cast members playing some version of themselves, most notably Pete Davidson and Leslie Jones. Longtime cast member Kenan Thompson has also developed several new characters and impressions, including Willie, Michael Che's fictional neighbor. Thompson also has brought on impressions of former MLB star David Ortiz and LaVar Ball. With Cecily Strong no longer anchoring Weekend Update, she reprised characters like The Girl You Wish You Hadn't Started a Conversation with at a Party and Cathy Anne, a woman with a southern accent who hits on Michael Che.

On October 13, 2018, former cast member/Weekend Update anchor Seth Meyers hosted the show for the first time since taking over hosting Late Night, and he returned to Weekend Update for the first time since he left the show, in a segment called "Really?!? With Seth, Colin, and Michael", a callback to the "Really?!? With Seth and Amy" segments. This time, Meyers, Jost, and Che talk and joke about rapper Kanye West (a Trump supporter) visiting the White House.

For the Thanksgiving episode in 2015, Jost and Che did a joke swap, where they each read a joke written for them by the other. Since season 44 in 2018, at the end of each Christmas show and season finale (except for season 47 and 48) Jost and Che have continued this segment, with both of them reading multiple jokes written by the other (except for the season 45 finale, where only Jost read a joke written by Che). During the segment, Jost's jokes for Che regularly consist of Che acting sleazy, often including bestiality and child sexual abuse, while Che forces Jost to say highly racist and sexist jokes, sometimes at the expense of his wife Scarlett Johansson, and to make him defend controversial figures such as Woody Allen and Harvey Weinstein. In 2024, Johansson was present in Studio 8H during the segment and reacted to Jost deliver jokes centered around the recent birth of their child.

Due to COVID-19 issues, the December 18, 2021 episode was filmed with no audience and a limited cast and crew. Weekend Update was still performed, but Jost was not part of the episode's cast, as he had tested positive for COVID. Tina Fey made a surprise guest appearance to fill in for Jost; due to the reduced staff, the segment was performed on chairs placed on the main stage rather than its usual newsroom set.

For the 2025 SNL50: The Anniversary Special, many familiar faces returned to the Update desk, including Bobby Moynihan who reprised his popular character, Drunk Uncle, Cecily Strong who returned as The Girl You Wish You Hadn't Started a Conversation with at a Party, and Bill Murray, who appeared to offer his ranking of the best ever Weekend Update Anchors, listing: "10. Colin Quinn, 9. Kevin Nealon, 8. Dennis Miller, 7. Seth Meyers, 6. Fey and Jimmy Fallon, 5. Fey and Poehler, 4. Chevy Chase, 3. Jane Curtin and Dan Aykroyd, 2. Norm Macdonald, 1. His brother Brian Doyle-Murray."

== Timeline ==
A total of 32 people have anchored the Weekend Update desk. Below is a complete list of any and all who have served as an anchor at one time or another, and the season(s) in which they served. Note that throughout most of 1984, different cast members, special guests, or the weekly host handled the task. Those individuals (denoted in italics) are also listed below.

=== Weekend Update (1975–1981) ===
Season 1 (1975–1976)

- Chevy Chase

Season 2 (1976–1977)

- Chevy Chase (Last: October 30, 1976)
- Jane Curtin (First: September 25, 1976)
- Jane Curtin and Buck Henry (February 20, 1977)

Note that Chase began the season as anchor on September 18, but missed the next two episodes because of an injury sustained while performing a sketch in the season's first episode. He was replaced by Curtin during his absence. Chase returned to the show (and the Weekend Update desk) from October 16 to 30. Curtin permanently took over Weekend Update beginning November 13. Henry co-anchored with Curtin on the Mardi Gras special.

Season 3 (1977–1978)

- Jane Curtin and Dan Aykroyd

Seasons 4–5 (1978–1980)

- Jane Curtin and Bill Murray (Aykroyd is now "Station Manager")

Season 6 (1980–1981)

- Charles Rocket
- Charles Rocket and Gail Matthius (January 10 to February 21, 1981)
- Saturday Night NewsLine with Jonathan Lear, Bill Murray, and Charles Rocket (March 7, 1981)
- Chevy Chase (April 11, 1981)

=== "SNL NewsBreak" (1981–1982) ===
Season 7 (1981–1982)

- Brian Doyle-Murray and Mary Gross (October 3–17, December 5, 1981)
- Brian Doyle-Murray (October 31, 1981 to February 6, 1982)
- Brian Doyle-Murray and Mary Gross (February 20 to March 20, 1982)
- Brian Doyle-Murray and Christine Ebersole (March 27 to May 22, 1982)

=== "Saturday Night News" (1982–1985) ===
Season 8 (1982–1983)

- Brad Hall

Season 9 (1983–1984)

- Brad Hall (Last: December 10, 1983)
- Show host Don Rickles (January 28, 1984)
- Show host Robin Williams (February 11, 1984)
- Joe Piscopo (February 18, 1984)
- Show host Billy Crystal (as Fernando) (March 17, 1984 and May 5, 1984)
- Show host Edwin Newman (February 25, 1984)
- Show host Michael Douglas (April 7, 1984)
- Show host George McGovern (April 14, 1984)
- Show host Edwin Newman (May 12, 1984)

Season 10 (1984–1985):

- Billy Crystal (as Fernando) (October 6, 1984)
- Show host Bob Uecker (October 13, 1984)
- Show host Jesse Jackson (October 20, 1984)
- Special guest Edwin Newman (November 3, 1984)
- Show host George Carlin (November 10, 1984)
- Show host Ed Asner (November 17, 1984)
- Christopher Guest (December 1, 1984 to April 13, 1985)

=== Weekend Update (1985–present) ===
Seasons 11–16 (1985–1991):

- Dennis Miller

Seasons 17–19 (1991–1994):

- Kevin Nealon

Seasons 20–22 (1994–1997):

- Norm Macdonald

Season 23 (1997–1998):

- Norm Macdonald (Last: December 13, 1997)
- Colin Quinn (First: January 10, 1998)

Seasons 24–25 (1998–2000):

- Colin Quinn

Seasons 26–29 (2000–2004):

- Jimmy Fallon and Tina Fey

Seasons 30–31 (2004–2006):

- Tina Fey and Amy Poehler (Horatio Sanz filled in for a pregnant Fey on October 1 and October 8, 2005, in Season 31)

Seasons 32–33 (2006–2008)

- Amy Poehler and Seth Meyers

Season 34 (2008–2009)

- Amy Poehler and Seth Meyers (Last: December 13, 2008)
- Seth Meyers (First: October 25, 2008)

Seasons 35–38 (2009–2013)

- Seth Meyers

Season 39 (2013–2014)

- Seth Meyers and Cecily Strong (Last: February 1, 2014)
- Cecily Strong and Colin Jost (First: March 1, 2014)

Season 40–present (2014–present)

- Colin Jost and Michael Che (Tina Fey filled in for Jost on December 18, 2021, in Season 47, due to Jost testing positive for COVID-19)

== Tenures by length ==
Cast Member	Tenure	Total seasons	Total episodes
Colin Jost	March 1, 2014 – present	11 seasons+	226 episodes
Michael Che	September 27, 2014 – present	10 seasons+	219 episodes
Seth Meyers	September 30, 2006 – February 1, 2014	8 seasons	154 episodes
Tina Fey	October 7, 2000 – May 21, 2005, October 22, 2005 – May 20, 2006 and December 18, 2021	7 seasons	118 episodes
Dennis Miller	November 9, 1985 – May 18, 1991	6 seasons	111 episodes
Jimmy Fallon	October 7, 2000 – May 15, 2004	4 seasons	80 episodes
Amy Poehler	October 2, 2004 – October 18, 2008, December 6–13, 2008, May 16, 2009, and September 25, 2010	6 seasons	80 episodes
Jane Curtin	September 25, 1976 – May 24, 1980	4 seasons	78 episodes
Norm Macdonald	September 24, 1994 – December 13, 1997	4 seasons	69 episodes
Kevin Nealon	September 28, 1991 – May 14, 1994	3 seasons	60 episodes
Colin Quinn	January 10, 1998 – May 20, 2000	3 seasons	50 episodes
Bill Murray	October 7, 1978 – May 24, 1980	2 seasons	40 episodes
Chevy Chase	October 11, 1975 – October 30, 1976, February 18, 1978, April 11, 1981, and December 6, 1986	2 seasons	32 episodes
Brad Hall	September 25, 1982 – December 10, 1983	2 seasons	28 episodes
Cecily Strong	September 28, 2013 – May 17, 2014	1 season	21 episodes
Dan Aykroyd	September 24, 1977 – May 20, 1978	1 season	20 episodes
Brian Doyle-Murray	October 3, 1981 – May 22, 1982	1 season	20 episodes
Charles Rocket	November 15, 1980 – March 7, 1981	1 season	12 episodes
Christopher Guest	December 1, 1984 – April 13, 1985	1 season	10 episodes
Mary Gross	October 3–17, 1981, December 5, 1981, and February 20 – March 20, 1982	1 season	7 episodes
Gail Matthius	January 10 – February 21, 1981	1 season	6 episodes
Christine Ebersole	March 27 – May 22, 1982	1 season	6 episodes
Billy Crystal (as Fernando)	March 17, May 5, and October 6, 1984	2 seasons	3 episodes
Horatio Sanz	October 1 & 8, 2005	1 season	2 episodes
Joe Piscopo	February 18, 1984	1 season	1 episode

=== Non-cast members who guest anchored ===
Several people who have never been SNL cast members appeared as Weekend Update guest anchors (or co-anchors). All but one of these occurrences took place in 1984, during seasons 9 and 10, when a rotating series of Weekend Update guest hosts were employed. The only exception took place in 1981, when actor Mark King (as "Dr. Jonathan Lear") made a single co-anchoring appearance during season 6.

- Edwin Newman (Three appearances: February 25, May 12 and November 3, 1984)
- Mark King (as "Dr. Jonathan Lear") (March 7, 1981)
- Don Rickles (January 28, 1984)
- Robin Williams (February 11, 1984)
- Michael Douglas (April 7, 1984)
- George McGovern (April 14, 1984)
- Bob Uecker (October 13, 1984)
- Jesse Jackson (October 20, 1984)
- George Carlin (November 10, 1984)
- Ed Asner (November 17, 1984)

== Controversies ==
=== Norm Macdonald ===
In 1998, former Weekend Update host Norm Macdonald was removed from the position for tackling taboo topics including the highly controversial 1994 murder trial of O.J. Simpson. Macdonald's comedic approach to the sensitive subject matter often crossed lines for some viewers and network executives. Don Ohlmeyer, former president of NBC's West Coast division, was a close friend of Simpson, and took offense to Macdonald's jokes.

Macdonald was immensely popular with audiences, leading to questions about his abrupt removal. Controversy broke out about the comedic freedom regarding sensitive topics, highlighting the complex dynamic between the network and talent.

=== Leslie Jones ===
In May 2014, Leslie Jones was criticized for a string of slave jokes. She made a joke about Lupita Nyong’o (who won the Academy Award for Best Supporting Actress for playing real-life slave Patsey in 12 Years a Slave) being named People magazine's most beautiful person, saying that during the slave days she herself would have been the most sought after, making comments about how she would have been paired with the best guy on that plantation and would have been the number one pick in the "slave draft". On Twitter she responded in defending her joke and how she was sad she has to defend herself to the black community.

=== Michael Che and Colin Jost ===
During a joke swap segment, Che was criticized for making jokes about Beyoncé's lighter complexion and blonde hair, about Scarlett Johansson (Jost's wife) being a better "Black Widow" than Coretta Scott King, and facetiously comparing Barack Obama to an African dodo.

On October 21, 2020, Che discussed the reversal of "don't ask, don't tell" and made a joke calling it "don't ask, don't tuck". The joke was criticized as transphobic. Weekend Update had previously come under fire for a 2016 joke about the dating app Tinder adding 37 gender identity options, a feature which Jost jokingly called, "Why Democrats lost the election".

In an interview for CBS News on May 15, 2022, Che said, "I do think that controversy brings people to talking. And I think as long as people are talking, it's not all that bad."

Scarlett Johansson shared her shock over a "vulgar" joke swap between her husband, Jost, and Che during the December 21, 2024 Weekend Update. The segment, where they read each other's unreviewed jokes, left Johansson stunned as she watched live. She joked that Che might have a vendetta against them, adding, "I honestly feel he's trying to get us permanently removed." Despite the explicit humor, she took it in stride and even suggested getting back at Che with a teleprompter swap on Today With Jenna & Friends. Johansson later hosted the May 17 broadcast, where she got a chance to get back at Che by coming onto the Update desk during the joke swap and forcing him to give an embarrassing apology.

During the December 7, 2024, episode of SNL, Jost and Che riffed about the recent assassination of United Healthcare CEO, Brian Thompson. Viewer reactions to the politically divisive jokes were mixed, with People magazine describing how some social media users saying "Making light of someone being murdered is in poor taste," saying that NBC "owes the family an apology."

A segment from the January 25, 2025, episode during Weekend Update depicted Ego Nwodim as a businesswoman concerned about recent actions by President Trump. BET reported that many users on social media thought the bit was "offensive" saying that SNL used "Black women as the butt of a joke".

=== Pete Davidson ===
In November 2018, Pete Davidson sparked controversy on Saturday Night Live's Weekend Update by mocking then-congressional candidate Dan Crenshaw's eye patch, which he wears due to a combat injury sustained as a Navy SEAL. Davidson joked that Crenshaw looked like "a hitman in a porno movie" and dismissively added, "I know he lost his eye in war or whatever." The remark was widely condemned as insensitive to veterans. The following week, Davidson invited Crenshaw onto SNL to issue a public apology, calling it "a poor choice of words" and recognizing Crenshaw as a war hero. Crenshaw accepted and used the moment to emphasize national unity and respect for service members. In his 2020 Netflix special, Alive from New York, Davidson expressed that he felt "forced" to apologize to Crenshaw during their 2018 Saturday Night Live appearance, stating, "I didn't think I did anything wrong."

== See also ==
- Saturday Night Live Weekend Update Thursday
- Saturday Night Live characters appearing on Weekend Update
- Recurring Saturday Night Live characters and sketches
