= Gail Matthius =

American actress

- Born: Sioux Falls, South Dakota
- Education: Gustavus Adolphus College
- Occupations: Actress; comedian
- Years active: 1980–2001; 2017–present

Gail Matthius is an American actress and comedian. She was a cast member of NBC's Saturday Night Live during the 1980–1981 season (produced by Jean Doumanian), and co-anchored the Weekend Update segment with Charles Rocket in 1981.

== Early life and career ==
A native of Sioux Falls, South Dakota, and graduate of Gustavus Adolphus College, Matthius had performed at The Comedy Store in Los Angeles prior to successfully auditioning for Saturday Night Live (SNL). Matthius's time on the show occurred only a year after her move to Los Angeles, a move that was funded by performing jingles and visiting farms on behalf of Allis-Chalmers tractors across the Great Plains.

== Saturday Night Live ==
In 2015, the magazine Rolling Stone ranked Matthius at, out of 141 cast members, the 74th best of Saturday Night Live, calling her, "A flicker of hope in the Saturday Night Live 1980 debacle, with a sharp valley girl mall-chick character named Vickie. Matthius and Vickie both deserved better." During her audition, she performed opposite Joe Piscopo as well as Paul Reubens.

=== Recurring characters ===
- Vickie, a valley girl who, along with her friend, Debbie (played by Denny Dillon), annoy people with their persistent questions and shallow statements.
- Roweena, a Midwestern-accented hairdresser who often has a neurotic, middle-aged woman named Nadine (played by Denny Dillon) as a frequent customer.
- Frances Lively, wife to Charles Rocket's Phil Lively, a fellow game show host who lives life at home as if it were just another game show.

=== Celebrity impersonations ===
- Brooke Shields, in a parody of the racy Calvin Klein TV advertisements that featured her.
- Irene Cara
- Nancy Reagan
- Mary Cunningham

== Post-SNL ==
Following her stint on SNL, Matthius appeared in the short-lived British/American sketch show Assaulted Nuts and the syndicated sketch comedy series Laugh Trax (where she revived her valley girl Vicki character from SNL). She auditioned for the Kathleen Turner role in Body Heat, though she was turned down.

She did voice acting for animated shows from the late 1980s into the 1990s, including Bobby's World (with Laugh Trax co-star Howie Mandel), Tiny Toon Adventures, Snorks, Animaniacs, The Ren & Stimpy Show, Bump in the Night and The Tick, often using the voice of her valley girl and Roweena characters from Saturday Night Live (in characters such as Martha, who sounds like Roweena, and Shirley the Loon from Tiny Toon Adventures).

Matthius is a member of the Spolin Players improv comedy troupe and works as a drama coach for various acting studios, including Theatre Palisades in Pacific Palisades, California. In 2016, Matthius appeared in the play For Piano and Harpo by Dan Castellaneta. Today, she performs in a rock band, The Shambles LA.

== Personal life ==
Matthius is married to her high school boyfriend, television writer and producer John Wirth. Their house in Pacific Palisades burned down on January 9, 2025, in the Palisades fire.

Media offices
Preceded by Charles Rocket as solo anchor	Weekend Update anchor with Charles Rocket; 1981	Succeeded by Brian Doyle-Murray and Mary Gross
