= Patrick Weathers =

American musician, actor and comedian

- Born: Hattiesburg, Mississippi
- Occupations: Actor; comedian; musician

Patrick Weathers is an American musician, actor and comedian, who appeared as a cast member on season 6 of Saturday Night Live from 1980 to 1981.

After college, Weathers moved to New Orleans, where he began working with The Meters. Moving to New York City, he performed alongside Run DMC before getting a job at Studio 54 which led to an audition for Saturday Night Live.

Among the characters Weathers played was Bob Dylan. He also played Ravi Shankar, the musician who introduced The Beatles to Indian music. Weathers was friends with David Sheffield, who became a prominent writer on the show then collaborator on many Eddie Murphy comedies.

Weathers had a successful musical career, prior to his year on SNL, and returned to music afterwards, releasing three albums, and settling in New Orleans. He owns several art galleries there, and appeared in the Will Ferrell comedy The Campaign.
