= Denny Dillon =

American actress and comedian (born 1951)

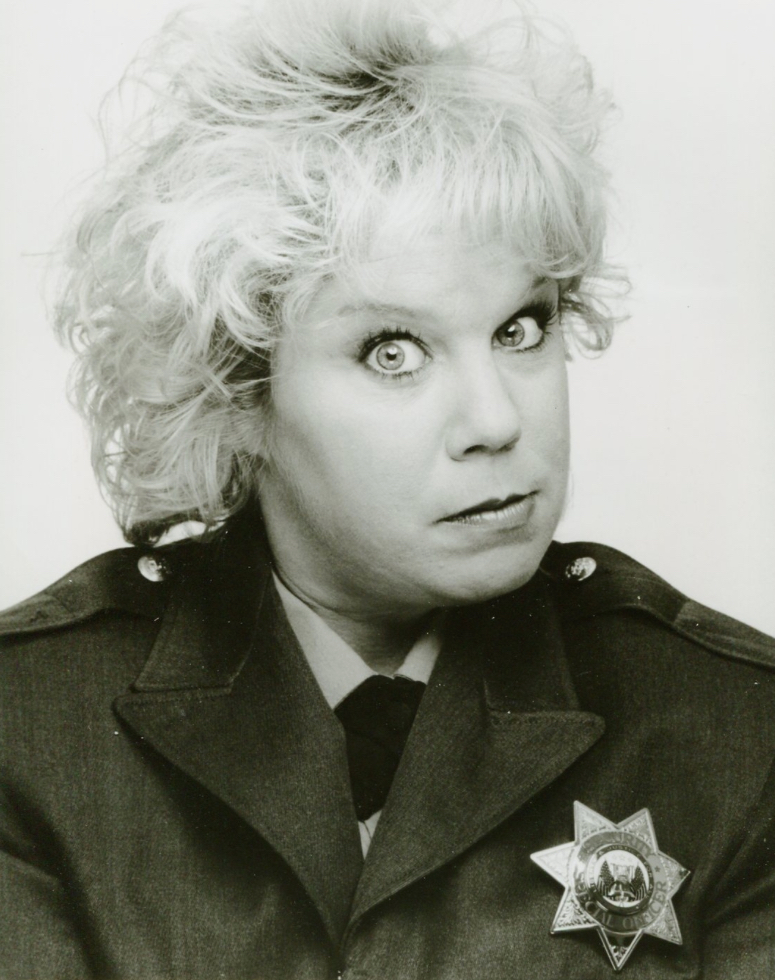
- Dillon in Women in Prison, 1987
- Born: May 18, 1951 (age 75); Cleveland, Ohio, U.S.
- Occupations: Comedian; actress
- Years active: 1973–present
- Spouse: Barbara Smiley (m. 2019)

Denny Dillon (born May 18, 1951) is an American actress and comedian best known for starring as Toby Pedalbee on the HBO comedy Dream On from 1990 to 1996. Dillon was first known for her stage work and was nominated for a Tony Award on Broadway. Other television credits include spending one season as a cast member on Saturday Night Live from 1980 to 1981 and co-starring on the Fox sitcom Women in Prison. She subsequently continued to act in theater and both teaches and performs improv comedy.

== Early life ==
Dillon was born in Cleveland, Ohio. She has lived in New York City and Los Angeles before moving to Ulster County, New York.

== Career ==
=== Early work ===
Dillon has performed on the Broadway stage, appearing as Agnes in the 1974 revival of Gypsy starring Angela Lansbury; in the 1975 revival of Thornton Wilder's The Skin of Our Teeth; in the 1980 stage version of Harold and Maude; and as Mickey in the 1983 Gershwin musical My One and Only, starring Tommy Tune and Twiggy, for which she received a nomination for a Tony Award for Featured Actress in a Musical. She later appeared as a replacement cast member in the 2003 Broadway play Enchanted April.

Dillon made her big screen debut in Saturday Night Fever, playing Doreen, who asks John Travolta's character, Tony, if she can wipe his forehead, and her television debut in the 1979-1980 children's television series Hot Hero Sandwich.

=== Saturday Night Live ===
Dillon auditioned for the premiere season of the late night variety television program Saturday Night Live in 1975, and though she was passed over by producer Lorne Michaels, she performed her "Talent Night at the Convent" act during the show's third episode, broadcast October 25, 1975. When she auditioned to be a cast member for the show's sixth season in 1980, Dillon beat out Mercedes Ruehl for the final female cast member slot.

Recurring SNL characters

- Debbie, Valley Girl Vickie's (Gail Matthius) best friend
- Mary Louise, a mentally disturbed child who scares people with her hand puppet, Sam the Snake
- Nadine, the neurotic frequent customer at Roweena's (Gail Matthius) Cut 'n Curl
- Pinky Waxman, Leo Waxman's (Gilbert Gottfried) wife and co-host on "What's It All About?"

Celebrity Impressions on SNL

- Amy Carter
- Betsy Maxwell
- Jean Harris
- Yoko Ono

=== Later work ===
Dillon provided the voice of Meadow Morn in the 1983 animated TV special The Magic of Herself the Elf. Other television roles include the role of Judy on the 1987 TV comedy series Dr. Science and a 1988 appearance on the Night Court episode "Educating Rhonda".

Dillon began her role as Toby Pedalbee, loyal assistant to Martin Tupper (Brian Benben), in the series Dream On in 1990.

She portrayed Roseanne Barr in the 1994 made-for-TV movie Roseanne: An Unauthorized Biography. Dillon performed voice work for the 2002 animated film Ice Age.

In regional theatre, Dillon appeared in the new musical Triumph of Love at Center Stage, Baltimore, Maryland, in December 1996, as one of a "comic trio of clowns". She appeared in the Tennessee Williams plays 8 by Tenn at the Hartford Stage in 2003. Dillon starred as Beatrice in the world premiere of Tom Dudzick's Don't Talk to the Actors at Studio Arena Theatre in Buffalo, New York in September 2007. In October - November 2010 she appeared in a new musical in "development", Roald Dahl's James and the Giant Peach at Goodspeed Musicals in Chester, Connecticut. In January 2012 she stars as Berthe in Boeing-Boeing at Hartford Stage.

Dillon has headed the "Improv Nation", based in the Hudson Valley (New York), since 2006. She is an Artist in-Residence at SUNY Ulster where she teaches improvisation and is on the faculty of Primary Stages.

== Personal life ==
In an August 2020 interview with Vulture, Dillon said she was gay and had married Barbara Smiley a year and a half prior. They live in New York's Hudson Valley. Although she was out to most of her colleagues during her time on Saturday Night Live, she was uncertain if producer Jean Doumanian or NBC executive Dick Ebersol were aware, saying, "It was a different time."
