= Yvonne Hudson =

American television actress (born 1955)

- Born: July 9, 1955 (age 71)
- Occupation: Television actress
- Years active: 1978–1985
- Notable work: Saturday Night Live (season 6)

Yvonne Hudson (born July 9, 1955) is an American television actress and comedian who is best known for being the first Woman of colour (WOC) to be credited as a cast member on Saturday Night Live. She has been described as a "versatile performer" who was "a pioneer in the show's history".

== Career ==
Hudson initially became involved with SNL as a front desk receptionist. She appeared in 14 episodes from season 3 to 5 but was not credited for her work. She first appeared in season 3 in February 18 1978 with a non-speaking role as part of a sketch titled U.S. Customs. A notable speaking role of hers was in the Bad Clams sketch from season 5 in 1979. In this sketch, Hudson and Garrett Morris play talk show hosts who feed expired seafood to Lucille Ball (played by Gilda Radner). In the 1980 season 5 finale, Hudson plays herself and says, "Hi, I’m Yvonne Hudson, and this is my Love Jones!"

The replacement of producer Lorne Michaels with Jean Doumanian led to cast member changes. Hudson was finally credited as a featured player in the show's 1980–1981 season 6. This recognition officially made her the first Black female cast member in the show's history. Hudson was one of three new feature players alongside Matthew Laurance and Eddie Murphy (the only one later promoted to repertory cast member). One significant performance of Hudson's includes her role as an angry neighbour who confronts Eddie Murphy about his loud music.

Hudson's last uncredited appearance was in 1984. Her departure meant the African-American female role needed to be filled. Danitra Vance was cast in 1985 for the show's 1985-1986 season 11. Vance was the first WOC to become a repertory cast member on SNL. As of 2025, only eight out of 172 cast members have been Black women.

Hudson and Vance were the first Black women to become SNL feature and repertory members respectively. But neither were offered an employment contract. In 1991, Ellen Cleghorne became the first WOC SNL cast member to be offered a contract. In a 2018 interview Cleghorne shared, "[...] they didn’t used to give black people contracts on SNL. That was cold-blooded. They didn’t even give them credit. The credits roll, your name’s not even on there. That was a joke because that’s how you got residuals.”

It is believed that Hudson was fired along with most of the cast at the end of the troubled 1980-1981 season. But Hudson continued to appear in seasons 7 to 9. Her roles were often limited and consistently uncredited. Hudson appeared in 32 episodes from seasons 3 to 10. A later instance is her involvement in season 7 with The Little Richard Simmons Show sketch where Eddie Murphy plays a character combining Little Richard and Richard Simmons as he leads four women through a musical exercise routine.

Hudson later worked as a production assistant for the 1985 TV special, Motown Returns to the Apollo. She has not acted in television roles since her last uncredited appearance on SNL in 1984. Cleghorne has said of Hudson that just, "because we don’t know where she is doesn’t mean she’s not out there doing what she needs to do.”
