= Ann Risley =

American actress and comedian

Anna F. "Ann" Risley (born in Madison, Wisconsin) is a retired American actress and comedian. She was a cast member of the TV series Saturday Night Live for the 12 episodes of the 1980–1981 season. These 12 broadcasts were the first episodes after producer Lorne Michaels left the show.

== Life and career ==
She was spotted by Woody Allen in a theatre production of his material and encouraged her to pursue an acting career in New York. Risley was cast in small parts in Allen's films Annie Hall, Manhattan and Stardust Memories. Before joining the cast of Saturday Night Live, she had a cameo on the show in 1976 as a psychiatrist's patient in the filmed sketch "Mobile Shrink".

She was cast for Saturday Night Live by Jean Doumanian, who had previously been the show's guest-booker, then associate producer. After 12 episodes, Doumanian was replaced by Dick Ebersol, who fired Risley along with Gilbert Gottfried and Charles Rocket before his first episode. In a 1999 article in People, Risley was quoted as saying her SNL experience was "horrible".

Prior to (and after) Saturday Night Live, Risley had roles in nine feature films, including Honky Tonk Freeway and Come Back to the Five and Dime, Jimmy Dean, Jimmy Dean.

She appeared in starring roles in two television pilots (Off Campus and Night After Night), was a five-week guest star on the daytime soap The Doctors, and appeared in five made-for-TV movies, including The Young Riders and Telling Secrets. After moving to Tucson, Arizona, Risley ran an acting/improv studio called The Studio for Actors beginning in 1986.

=== Celebrity impersonations ===
- Doria Palmieri
- Toni Tennille
- Rosalynn Carter

== Feature film (speaking roles) ==
- 1977 Annie Hall as Susan (Directed by Woody Allen)
- 1978 Oliver's Story as Jane (Directed by John Korty)
- 1979 Manhattan as Mrs. Finch (Directed by Woody Allen)
- 1980 Simon as Pam (Directed by Marshall Brickman)
- 1980 Stardust Memories as Nurse (Directed by Woody Allen)
- 1981 Honky Tonk Freeway as Patricia (Directed by John Schlesinger)
- 1981 Rich and Famous as Merideth (Directed by George Cukor)
- 1982 Come Back to the Five and Dime, Jimmy Dean, Jimmy Dean as Martha (Directed by Robert Altman)
- 1986 Desert Bloom as Mrs. Muratore (Directed by Eugene Corr)

== Television ==
- Saturday Night Live (one year) – Cast member – 1980-81 Season, NBC (N.Y.C.)
- Off Campus (sitcom pilot) – Bonnie (starring role) – CBS (N.Y.C.)
- Night After Night (sitcom pilot) – Anne (starring role) – MTM/CBS (L.A.)
- The Doctors (soap, 5 wk guest star) – Hermione (with Alec Baldwin) – NBC (N.Y.C.)
- The Young Riders (3 episodes) – Clerk/Wife (with Josh Brolin) – ABC series (Tucson, AZ)

== Movies for television ==
- 1990 El Diablo as Judith - HBO film (Tucson, AZ)
- 1992 Sunstroke as Woman In Office (with Jane Seymour) - TNT film (Phoenix, AZ)
- 1992 Four Eyes and Six Guns as Saloon Hostess (with Patricia Clarkson) – TNT film (Tucson, AZ)
- 1993 Telling Secrets as Sally DeVries (with Cybill Shepherd) - ABC miniseries (Scottsdale, AZ)

== Selected stage roles ==
- Come Back to the Five and Dime – Martha (and substitute for lead actresses Karen Black and Sandy Dennis – Broadway (NYC)
- A Little Family Business – role of Connie (Angela Lansbury's daughter) – Ahmanson Theatre (L.A.) and Broadway (NYC)
- A History of the American Film – (substitute for all 4 female leads) – Arena Stage (Wash. DC)
- Uncommon Women – Rita-Huntington Theatre (Boston, Mass.)
- Spoon River Anthology – 16 roles – San Francisco Tour (CA)
- The Importance of Being Earnest – Cecily
- Private Lives – Amanda
- The Owl and the Pussycat – Doris
- Lovers (winners) – Maggie
- Same Time Next Year – Doris

== Training ==
- BAI – University of Wisconsin – Theatre Communications
- Various individual workshops in N.Y.C. and San Francisco
