= Charles Rocket =

American actor and comedian (1949–2005)

- Born: Charles Adams Claverie; August 28, 1949; Bangor, Maine, U.S.
- Died: October 7, 2005 (aged 56); Canterbury, Connecticut, U.S.
- Other names: Charlie Hamburger; Charlie Kennedy
- Occupations: Actor; comedian; musician; reporter
- Years active: 1980–2005
- Spouse: Beth Crellin (m. 1972)
- Children: 1

Charles Adams Claverie (August 28, 1949 – October 7, 2005), known by stage names Charlie Hamburger, Charlie Kennedy, and Charles Rocket, was an American actor. He was a cast member on Saturday Night Live, played the villain Nicholas Andre in the film Dumb and Dumber, and played Dave Dennison in Disney's Hocus Pocus.

== Early life ==
Rocket was born in Bangor, Maine, the son of Mary Aurelia (née Fogler) and Sumner Abbott "Ham" Claverie. His maternal grandfather was Raymond H. Fogler, who had served as Assistant Secretary of the Navy. He attended Winnacunnet High School and the Rhode Island School of Design (RISD) in the late 1960s and was part of the Rhode Island underground culture scene in the 1970s that also included Talking Heads frontman David Byrne and film director Gus Van Sant.

== Career ==
Rocket made several short films and fronted his band, the Fabulous Motels, on accordion (which he later used in an SNL sketch about a crazed criminal who uses an accordion to kill his dates and is killed himself by a bagpipe band).

He was then a news anchor at WPRI-TV in Providence, Rhode Island, and KOAA-TV in Pueblo, Colorado, under his own name, and WTVF in Nashville under the name Charles Kennedy.

=== Saturday Night Live ===
Rocket was cast for the 1980–1981 season, which followed the departure of the remaining members of the show's original cast and executive producer Lorne Michaels. Singled out by new executive producer Jean Doumanian, he was promoted as a cross between Bill Murray and Chevy Chase. Rocket was tapped to anchor Weekend Update, and was featured in more sketches than any other male cast member that season.

Rocket portrayed recurring character Phil Lively, a game show host who took his larger-than-life persona home and treated life as if it were a game show. His celebrity impersonations on SNL included Ronald Reagan, David Rockefeller, Prince Charles, and Marlin Perkins. He also hosted "The Rocket Report", a series of filmed segments where he posed as a roving reporter around New York; in later years, reviewers considered them one of the few consistently strong parts of Doumanian's shows.

==== Dismissal ====
The Saturday Night Live episode of February 21, 1981, hosted by Dallas star Charlene Tilton, featured a parody of the famed "Who shot J.R.?" story arc from the popular nighttime soap. During the show, a plot line had Rocket and Tilton flirting while other cast members expressed jealousy, leading to Rocket being shot in the chest by a sniper in the middle of a sketch. In the show's closing moments, as cast members gathered with the host to say good night, Tilton asked Rocket how he felt about being shot. In character, Rocket replied "Oh man, it's the first time I've ever been shot in my life. I'd like to know who fuckin' did it."

Due partially to the violation of broadcast standards (though FCC rules weren't violated as it was uttered past safe harbor), along with negative press regarding the new cast and declining ratings for both the series and the network in general, NBC replaced Doumanian with Dick Ebersol after one further episode. Ebersol, who placed the show on hiatus for a month to retool, dismissed Rocket, along with several of the writers and fellow cast members Gilbert Gottfried and Ann Risley, before the next episode. A writers' strike led to the suspension of the rest of the season, and when the show returned in October 1981, Joe Piscopo and Eddie Murphy were the only cast members who were held over from Doumanian's era. Saturday Night: A Backstage History of Saturday Night Live revealed that Rocket was particularly hostile toward Murphy and Piscopo, as he believed the two isolated themselves from the rest of the cast.

=== Post-SNL career ===
After SNL, Rocket worked steadily in film, with roles in such films as Hocus Pocus, Earth Girls Are Easy, It's Pat, Steal Big Steal Little, How I Got into College, Dances with Wolves and Dumb and Dumber, often playing comic foils.

On television, in addition to guest spots on several 1980s sitcoms, he played antagonist network president Ned Grossberg on the cyberpunk series Max Headroom, Richard Addison (brother to Bruce Willis's David Addison) on the comedy-drama Moonlighting, and Adam, an angel of death, on Touched by an Angel. He later guest starred in other series including Wings as Danny, a long time friend to Brian Hackett (Steven Weber), 3rd Rock from the Sun as Gary, a physics professor, and The King of Queens as Steve Moscow, a Russian contractor who is hired to remove mold from Doug and Carrie Heffernan's house.

In addition to his acting work, Rocket played accordion on the B-52's album Mesopotamia, produced by David Byrne, on the track "Loveland", and the album Amarcord Nino Rota on the track "La Dolce Vita Suite", produced by Saturday Night Live music coordinator Hal Willner.

He also provided the voice of Leo Lionheart Jr. in the "MGM Sing-Alongs" videos in 1996.

== Personal life ==
Rocket married his college girlfriend, Beth Crellin, on board the battleship USS Massachusetts anchored in Fall River, Massachusetts, in 1972. Their son, Zane, was born in 1976.

=== Death ===
Rocket was found dead in a field on his Connecticut property on October 7, 2005, with his throat slit. He was 56 years old. Ten days later, the state medical examiner ruled the death as suicide. The police investigation determined that there was no criminal aspect to the case.

== Filmography ==
=== Film ===
Year	Title	Role	Notes
1984	The Outlaws	Stanley Flynn	
1985	Fraternity Vacation	'Madman' Mac	
1986	Miracles	Michael	
1987	Down Twisted	Reno	
1988	Earth Girls Are Easy	Ted Gallagher	
1989	How I Got into College	Leo Whitman	
1989	Honeymoon Academy	DeBains	
1990	Dances with Wolves	Lieutenant Elgin	
1991	Delirious	Ty Hedison	
1993	Brainsmasher... A Love Story	Detective Jones	
1993	Hocus Pocus	Dave	
1993	Short Cuts	Wally Littleton	
1994	It's Pat	Kyle Jacobsen	
1994	Wagons East	General Larchmont	
1994	Dumb and Dumber	Nicholas Andre	
1995	Steal Big Steal Little	Sheriff Otis	
1995	Charlie's Ghost Story	Van Leer	
1995	Tom and Huck	Judge Thatcher	
1997	Murder at 1600	Jeffrey	
1997	Fathers' Day	Russ Trainor	
1997	The Killing Grounds	Mel Desordo	
1998	Dry Martini	Sam	
1999	Carlo's Wake	Derek Donovan	
2000	Titan A.E.	Firrikash / Slave Trader Guard (voice)	
2000	Tex, the Passive-Aggressive Gunslinger	Bart	
2002	New Suit	Del Strontium	
2002	Bleach	Reverend Jim	Short film
2003	Shade	Tony D	
2004	Yu-Gi-Oh! The Movie: Pyramid of Light	Narrator (voice)	
2008	Fly Me to the Moon	Mission Control 1961 (voice)	Posthumous release

=== Television ===
Year	Title	Role	Notes
1980–1981	Saturday Night Live	Various characters	
1984	Hawaiian Heat	Donald	Episode: "Picture Imperfect"
1985	Steel Collar Man	D5B	Television film
1985	Remington Steele	Peter Gillespie	Episode: "Have I Got a Steele For You"
1985	California Girls	Barry	Television film
1985	Hardcastle and McCormick	Bill Bauer	Episode: "The Yankee Clipper"
1985–1989	Moonlighting	Richard Addison	6 episodes
1986	Miami Vice	Marty Worhington	Episode: "Florence Italy"
1987–1988	Max Headroom	Ned Grossberg	4 episodes
1988–1989	Murphy's Law	Victor Beaudine	5 episodes
1990	Thirtysomething	Ron DeLisle	Episode: "Going Limp"
1990	Doctor Doctor	Charles	Episode: "The Terminator"
1990	Murder, She Wrote	Lieutenant Stuyvesant	Episode: "The Family Jewels"
1990–1992	Quantum Leap	Dirk Riker, Michael Blake	2 episodes
1991	Parker Lewis Can't Lose	Sergeant Jake Melman	Episode: "Randall Without a Cause"
1992	Tequila and Bonetti	Captain Midian Knight	11 episodes
1993	Flying Blind	Dennis Lake	5 episodes
1993	Wild Palms	Stitch	Miniseries, 3 episodes
1994	Wings	Danny	Episode: "Call of the Wild"
1994	Lois & Clark: The New Adventures of Superman	Ryan Wiley	Episode: "Operation Blackout"
1994–2003	Touched by an Angel	Adam	10 episodes
1995–1996	The Home Court	Judge Gil Fitzpatrick	20 episodes
1996	The Adventures of Hyperman	Oil Monster (voice)	Episode: "Oceans a Leavin'"
1996	Picket Fences	Chuck Dante	Episode: "Dante's Inferno"
1996	The Pretender	Carl Bishop	Episode: "To Serve and Protect"
1997	Grace Under Fire	Davis	Episode: "Riverboat Queen"
1997–1998	The New Batman Adventures	Guru, Frederick Fournier, Security Guard (voice)	3 episodes
1998	Jenny	Grant	Episode: "A Girl's Gotta Protect Her Assets"
1998	Cybill	Charlie Addison	2 episodes
1999	Tracey Takes On...	Chopper Tim	Episode: "Road Rage"
1999	Superman: The Animated Series	Used Car Salesman (voice)	Episode: "Superman's Pal"
1999	Star Trek: Voyager	Jippeq	Episode: "The Disease"
1999	The X-Files	Grant Ellis	Episode: "Three of a Kind"
1999	Batman Beyond	Don Grasso (voice)	Episode: "Hooked Up"
2000	Normal, Ohio	Danny	7 episodes
2001	3rd Rock from the Sun	Gary Hennings	Episode: "A Dick Replacement"
2001	The Zeta Project	Edwards (voice)	Episode: "Change of Heart"
2002	Greg the Bunny	Don Dinkins	Episode: "Father and Son Reunion"
2003	Static Shock	Crewcut (voice)	Episode: "Shebang"
2003	The King of Queens	Steve	Episode: "Steve Moscow"
2004	Law & Order: Criminal Intent	Donny DePalma	Episode: "Pas de Deux"

=== Video games ===
Year	Title	Role	Notes
2001	Star Wars: Starfighter	Nym	
2002	Star Wars: Jedi Starfighter	Nym	
2002	Age of Mythology	Ajax	

=== Music videos ===
- 1989 "Yer So Bad" by Tom Petty
- 1991 "King of the Hill" by Roger McGuinn with Tom Petty
- 1997 "Good Year" by The Refreshments

== Bibliography ==
- Hill, Doug and Weingrad, Jeff (1986). Saturday Night: A Backstage History of Saturday Night Live. New York, Beech Tree Books/William Morrow. ISBN 0-688-05099-9.

Media offices
Preceded by Jane Curtin and Bill Murray	Weekend Update anchor with Gail Matthius 1981; 1980–1981	Succeeded by Brian Doyle-Murray and Mary Gross
