= Jean Doumanian =

American television and film producer

- Born: Jean Karabas; 1937 (age 88–89)
- Occupations: Television producer; theater producer; film producer
- Spouse: John Doumanian (m. 1959, divorced)
- Partner: Jacqui Safra

Jean Doumanian (née Karabas; born 1937) is an American stage, television and film producer.

== Early life ==
Doumanian was born Jean Karabas and grew up in Chicago, the daughter of Greek immigrant parents. Her father was a restaurateur. She attended the University of Illinois but dropped out as a junior to marry John Doumanian in 1959, a promoter for Capitol Records. While out with her husband, who was scouting new talent in the clubs of Chicago, she met stand-up comedian Woody Allen, who was sharing a billing with Capitol singer Nancy Wilson. A friendship developed after Allen's manager, Jack Rollins, asked the couple to show Allen around Chicago and her husband became Allen's road manager.

== Career ==
The Doumanians divorced and John Doumanian moved to California. Jean moved to New York at the request of up-and-coming comedian Dick Cavett as a pre-interviewer and writer for ABC's The Dick Cavett Show; and then as an associate producer for Saturday Night Live with Howard Cosell. In 1975, she took a position with NBC as associate producer for Saturday Night Live.

=== Saturday Night Live ===
Show creator Lorne Michaels resigned as producer of Saturday Night Live at the end of its fifth season and the entire cast and writing staff followed, with the exception of writer Brian Doyle-Murray. Doumanian, who had been an associate producer during the first five seasons of the show and produced a special for Michaels in 1978, was one of the few who remained. She was offered Michaels' job running SNL, much to Michaels' surprise, and took over the show for the 1980 season, hiring a completely new cast and new writers.

Doumanian's tenure as SNL executive producer was tumultuous. She hired Denny Dillon, Gilbert Gottfried, Gail Matthius, Joe Piscopo, Ann Risley and Charles Rocket as repertory players, and Yvonne Hudson, Matthew Laurance and Patrick Weathers as featured players. Then-unknown Eddie Murphy would join the show as a featured player on the fourth episode and was upgraded to repertory status on January 24, 1981.

With its team of all-new writers and cast members, the show was plagued with problems from the start. It was deemed a commercial disappointment, and suffered from competition with ABC's new weekend show, Fridays, and the Canadian Broadcasting Corporation import SCTV, which NBC aired following the Tonight Show on Fridays, as well as budget cuts.

In a cliffhanger titled "Who Shot C.R." from the episode on February 21, 1981, cast member Charles Rocket was "shot" after cast members shared their grievances with Rocket and with one another. When that episode's host, Charlene Tilton, asked Rocket what it felt like to be shot, he replied "Oh man, it's the first time I've been shot in my life. I'd like to know who the fuck did it." The uncensored expletive, seemingly planned, landed the show, its producer and the network in trouble. After one further episode on March 7, 1981, the show was put on a month-long hiatus after NBC executives decided the show needed an immediate overhaul, and Doumanian was dismissed from her position at SNL and replaced by Dick Ebersol, who fired Gottfried, Risley and Rocket before the end of the hiatus. After one episode on April 11, a writers' strike began, causing the season to end early. After the season ended, Ebersol fired Matthius and Dillon. Only Piscopo, Murphy, and writers Pam Norris, Barry Blaustein and David Sheffield remained from Doumanian's tenure when the next season started (Doyle-Murray was kept on as a writer for the next season, as well, but was not credited for the April 11 episode). One of Doumanian's writers, Terry Sweeney, would become a cast member on the show in 1985 after Lorne Michaels returned to replace Ebersol.

On February 15, 2015, Doumanian attended the SNL 40th anniversary special.

=== Film ===
After leaving SNL, Doumanian was a producer for several of Woody Allen's films:

- Bullets over Broadway (1994)
- Mighty Aphrodite (1995)
- Everyone Says I Love You (1996)
- Deconstructing Harry (1997)
- Celebrity (1998)
- Sweet and Lowdown (1999)
- Small Time Crooks (2000)

She co-produced the 1994 made-for-television film Don't Drink the Water and the 1997 documentary, Wild Man Blues, a film about a tour by Woody Allen's jazz band. During production of The Curse of the Jade Scorpion in 2000, however, she reportedly shocked Allen with the abrupt announcement that he had 48 hours to find alternative funding for the film. In May 2001, Allen filed a lawsuit against Doumanian and her business partner and long-time boyfriend Jacqui Safra, before Judge Ira Gammerman in the New York Supreme Court, claiming their production company had skimmed profits off of the movies. The lawsuit was settled in 2002 for an undisclosed amount.

Other films which Doumanian has produced or co-produced include The Spanish Prisoner, All the Real Girls, and The Ox, which was nominated for an Academy Award (Best Foreign Language Film) in 1992. She produced the 2013 film August: Osage County, which garnered Academy Award nominations for its stars, Meryl Streep and Julia Roberts.

=== Theater ===
Doumanian has been producer on many Broadway productions, including Frankie and Johnny in the Clair de Lune, Amour, Jumpers, Democracy, the Tony Award and Pulitzer Prize-winning August: Osage County, Mary Stuart, Superior Donuts, the Tony Award-winning Book of Mormon, The Motherfucker with the Hat, The House of Blue Leaves, The Mountaintop, the Tony Award-winning 2012 revival of Death of a Salesman, Nice Work If You Can Get It, and The Testament of Mary.

Off-Broadway, she produced David Cromer's acclaimed production of Our Town, which garnered Lucille Lortel Awards for Outstanding Production and Outstanding Direction and an Obie Award for Outstanding Director. She also produced David Cromer's production of Tribes, which won the 2011-2012 New York Drama Critics Circle Award for Best Foreign Play as well as the 2012 Drama Desk Award for Outstanding Play. Additional Off Broadway credits include Bat Boy: The Musical. On London's West End, she produced The Mountaintop, winner of the 2010 Olivier Award for Best New Play, and Chimerica.
