= List of Saturday Night Live feature films =

The American sketch comedy television series Saturday Night Live, which debuted on NBC in 1975, has been the genesis of eleven feature-length films, based on some of the more popular sketches and characters that have achieved varying levels of success. The first cinematic foray came with the successful Dan Aykroyd and John Belushi vehicle, The Blues Brothers (1980), which earned over $115 million on a $27 million budget.

In 1990, Lorne Michaels oversaw the writing of a sketch anthology feature film titled The Saturday Night Live Movie with many of the show's then-current writing staff—including Al Franken, Tom Davis, Greg Daniels, Jim Downey, Conan O'Brien, Robert Smigel, and George Meyer—contributing. The screenplay only got as far as a Revised First Draft dated July 26, 1990 before being abandoned.

The success of Wayne's World (1992) encouraged Michaels to produce more film spin-offs, based on several popular sketch characters. Michaels revived 1970s characters for Coneheads (1993), followed by It's Pat (1994), Stuart Saves His Family (1995), A Night at the Roxbury (1998), Superstar (1999), and The Ladies Man (2000).

Most of these were box office and critical failures, notably It's Pat, which did so poorly commercially that Touchstone Pictures pulled it only one week after release. Characters from The Muppet Movie and Office Space appeared on SNL before the films, but had already appeared on other television shows before SNL.

== Films ==
Film	Year	Details			
Film	Year	Saturday Night Live sketches based on	Director(s)	Writer(s)	Distributor(s)
The Blues Brothers	1980	The Blues Brothers by Dan Aykroyd & John Belushi	John Landis	Dan Aykroyd & John Landis	Universal Pictures
Wayne's World	1992	Wayne's World by Mike Myers	Penelope Spheeris	Mike Myers, Bonnie Turner & Terry Turner	Paramount Pictures
Bob Roberts	1992	Bob Roberts by Tim Robbins	Tim Robbins	Tim Robbins	Paramount Pictures
Coneheads	1993	Coneheads by Dan Aykroyd	Steve Barron	Tom Davis, Dan Aykroyd, Bonnie Turner & Terry Turner	Paramount Pictures
Wayne's World 2	1993	Wayne's World by Mike Myers	Stephen Surjik	Mike Myers, Bonnie Turner & Terry Turner	Paramount Pictures
It's Pat	1994	Pat by Julia Sweeney	Adam Bernstein	Julia Sweeney, Jim Emerson & Stephen Hibbert	Buena Vista Pictures
Stuart Saves His Family	1995	Stuart Smalley by Al Franken	Harold Ramis	Al Franken	Paramount Pictures
Blues Brothers 2000	1998	The Blues Brothers by Dan Aykroyd & John Belushi	John Landis	Dan Aykroyd & John Landis	Universal Pictures
A Night at the Roxbury	1998	The Roxbury Guys by Chris Kattan & Will Ferrell	John Fortenberry	Will Ferrell, Chris Kattan & Steve Koren	Paramount Pictures
Superstar	1999	Mary Katherine Gallagher by Molly Shannon	Bruce McCulloch	Steve Koren	Paramount Pictures
The Ladies Man	2000	Leon Phelps, The Ladies Man by Tim Meadows	Reginald Hudlin	Tim Meadows, Dennis McNicholas & Harper Steele (credited as Andrew Steele)	Paramount Pictures
MacGruber	2010	MacGruber by Will Forte, John Solomon & Jorma Taccone	Jorma Taccone	Will Forte, John Solomon & Jorma Taccone	Universal Pictures

== Reception ==
=== Box office performance ===
Film	Release date (United States)	Budget (estimated)	Box office revenue		
Film	Release date (United States)	Budget (estimated)	United States	Elsewhere	Worldwide
The Blues Brothers	June 20, 1980	$27 million	$57,229,890	$58,000,000	$115,229,890
Wayne's World	February 14, 1992	$20 million	$121,697,323	$61,400,000	$183,097,323
Bob Roberts	February 14, 1992	$3.9 million	$8,000,000	—N/a	$8,000,000
Coneheads	July 23, 1993	$33 million	$21,274,717	—N/a	$21,274,717
Wayne's World 2	December 10, 1993	$40 million	$48,197,805	—N/a	$48,197,805
It's Pat	August 26, 1994	$8 million	$60,822	—N/a	$60,822
Stuart Saves His Family	April 14, 1995	$6.3 million	$912,082	—N/a	$912,082
Blues Brothers 2000	February 6, 1998	$28 million	$14,051,384	—N/a	$14,051,384
A Night at the Roxbury	October 2, 1998	$17 million	$30,331,165	—N/a	$30,331,165
Superstar	October 8, 1999	$14 million	$30,636,478	—N/a	$30,636,478
The Ladies Man	October 13, 2000	$24 million	$13,616,610	$126,602	$13,743,212
MacGruber	May 21, 2010	$10 million	$8,525,600	$797,295	$9,259,314

=== Critical response ===
Year	Film	Rotten Tomatoes	Metacritic	CinemaScore
1980	The Blues Brothers	73% (90 reviews)	60% (12 reviews)	—N/a
1992	Wayne's World	78% (88 reviews)	57% (14 reviews)	A−
1992	Bob Roberts	93% (44 reviews)	70% (26 reviews)	B+
1993	Coneheads	35% (31 reviews)	49% (20 reviews)	B+
1993	Wayne's World 2	61% (44 reviews)	60% (21 reviews)	A-
1994	It's Pat	0% (11 reviews)	18% (6 reviews)	—N/a
1995	Stuart Saves His Family	30% (27 reviews)	54% (16 reviews)	—N/a
1998	Blues Brothers 2000	46% (46 reviews)	48% (23 reviews)	B−
1998	A Night at the Roxbury	11% (55 reviews)	26% (14 reviews)	C−
1999	Superstar	32% (74 reviews)	42% (28 reviews)	C+
2000	The Ladies Man	11% (73 reviews)	22% (23 reviews)	C−
2010	MacGruber	48% (151 reviews)	43% (24 reviews)	C−
