= 16th Golden Raspberry Awards =

Award ceremony

- Date: March 24, 1996
- Site: Hollywood Roosevelt Hotel, Los Angeles, California

Highlights
- Worst Picture: Showgirls
- Most awards: Showgirls (7)
- Most nominations: Showgirls (13)

The 16th Golden Raspberry Awards were held on March 24, 1996, at the Hollywood Roosevelt Hotel to recognize the worst the movie industry had to offer in 1995. For the first time in Razzie history, an actual "winner" showed up to the ceremony and accepted his award: Showgirls director Paul Verhoeven.

== Awards and nominations ==
Winner (in bold)
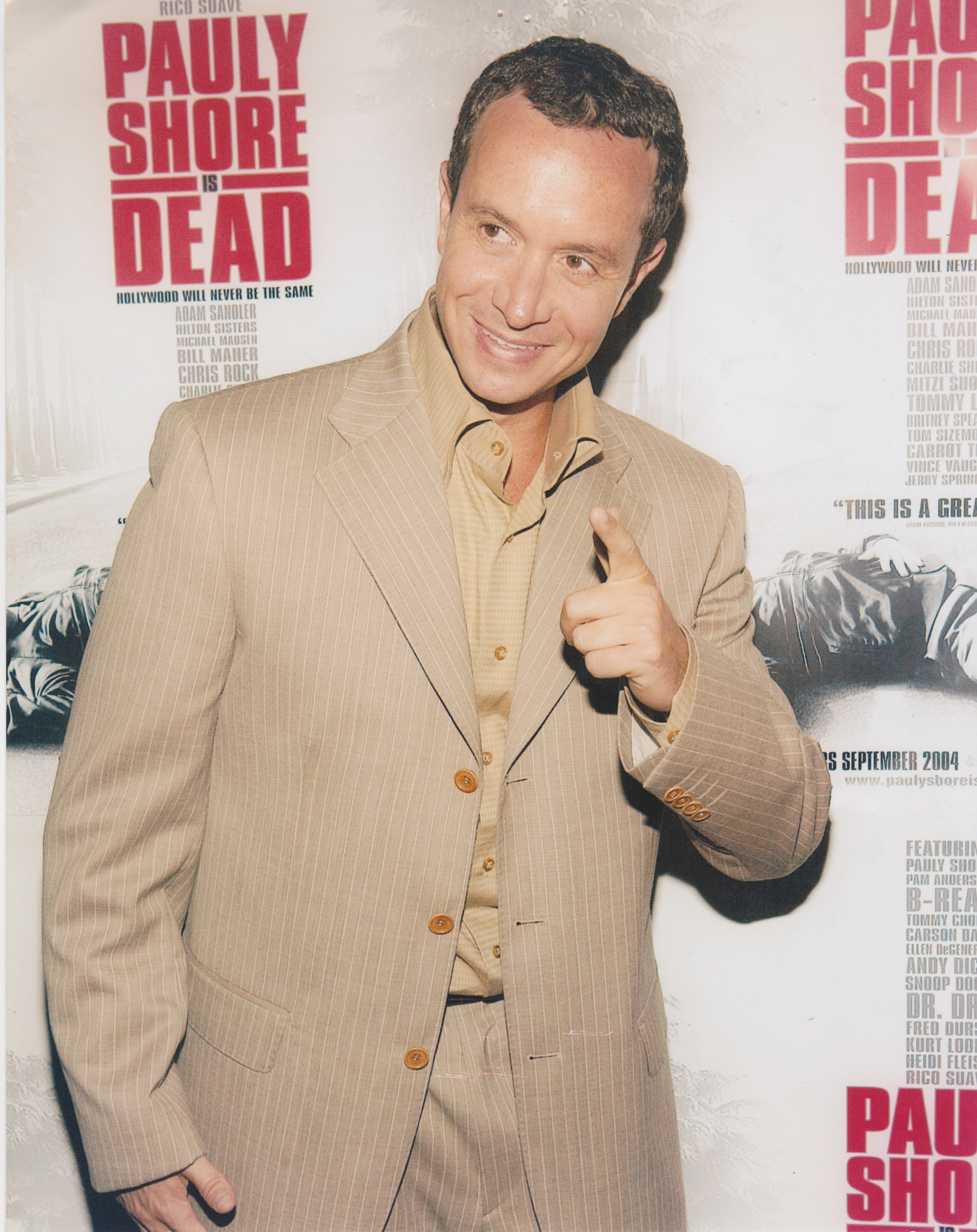
Pauly Shore, Worst Actor winner

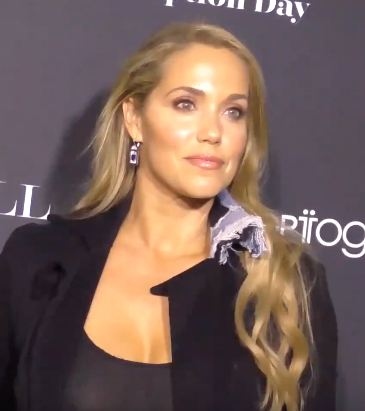
Elizabeth Berkley, Worst Actress winner and Worst New Star winner

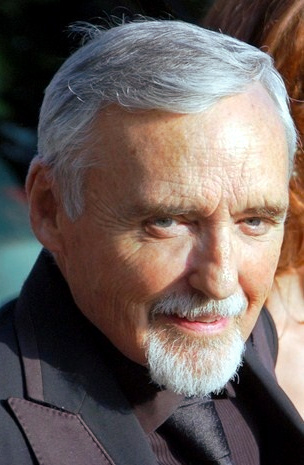
Dennis Hopper, Worst Supporting Actor winner

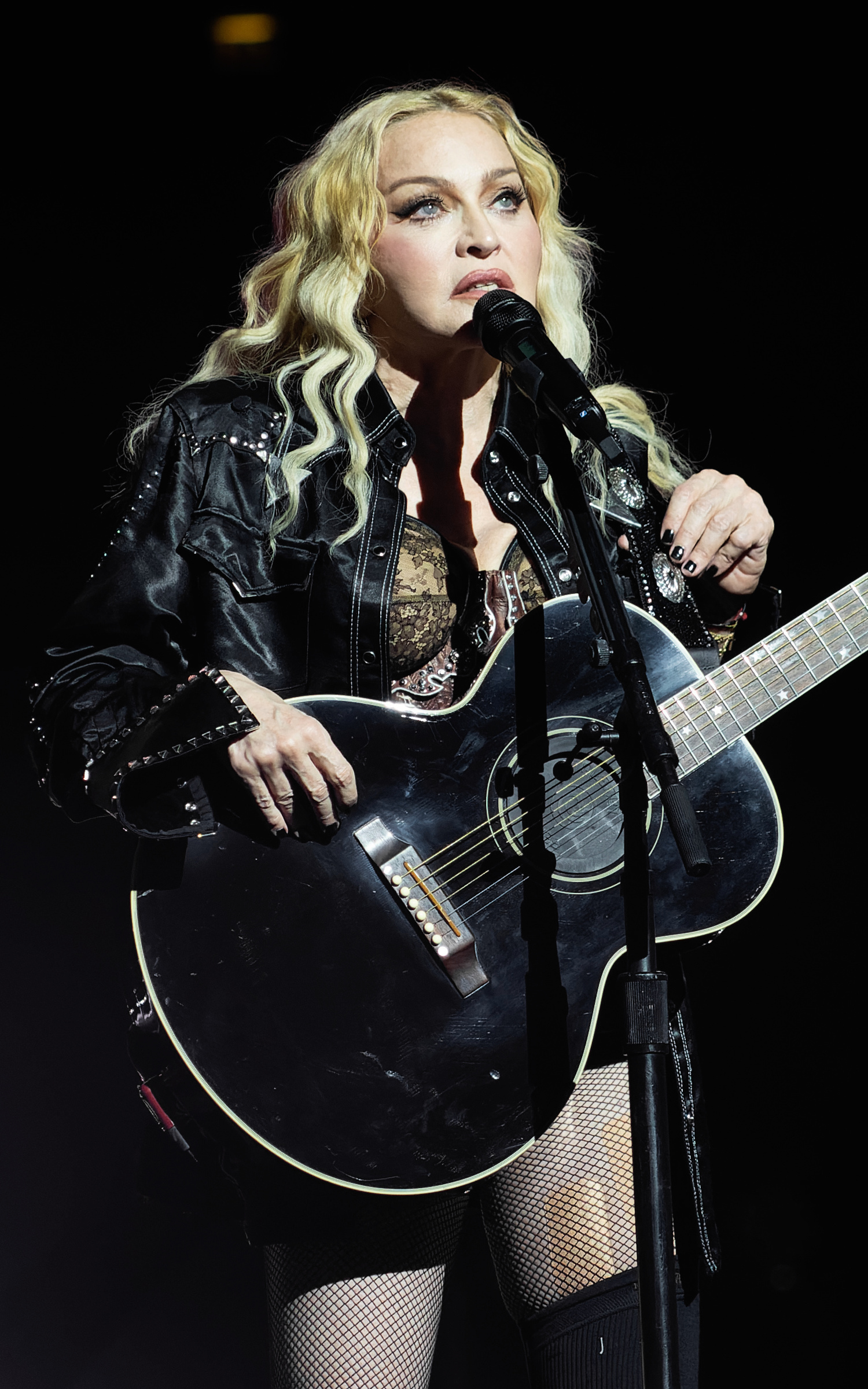
Madonna, Worst Supporting Actress winner

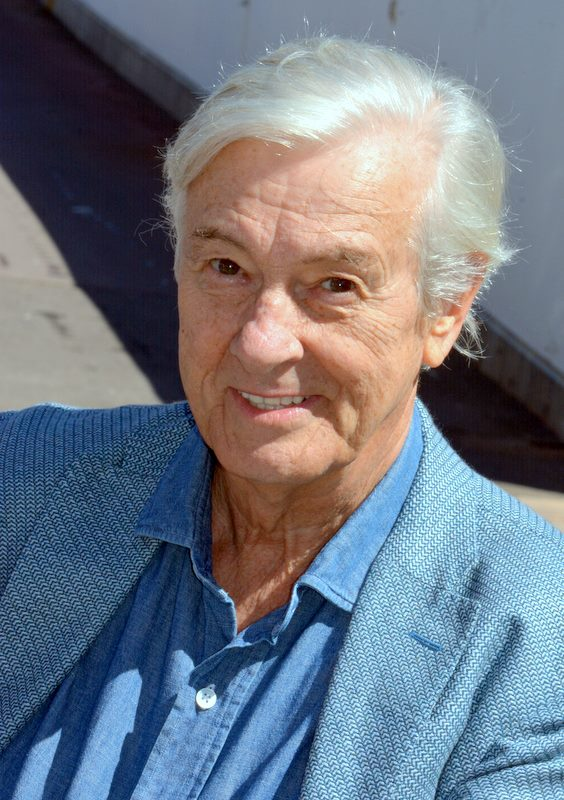
Paul Verhoeven, Worst Director winner

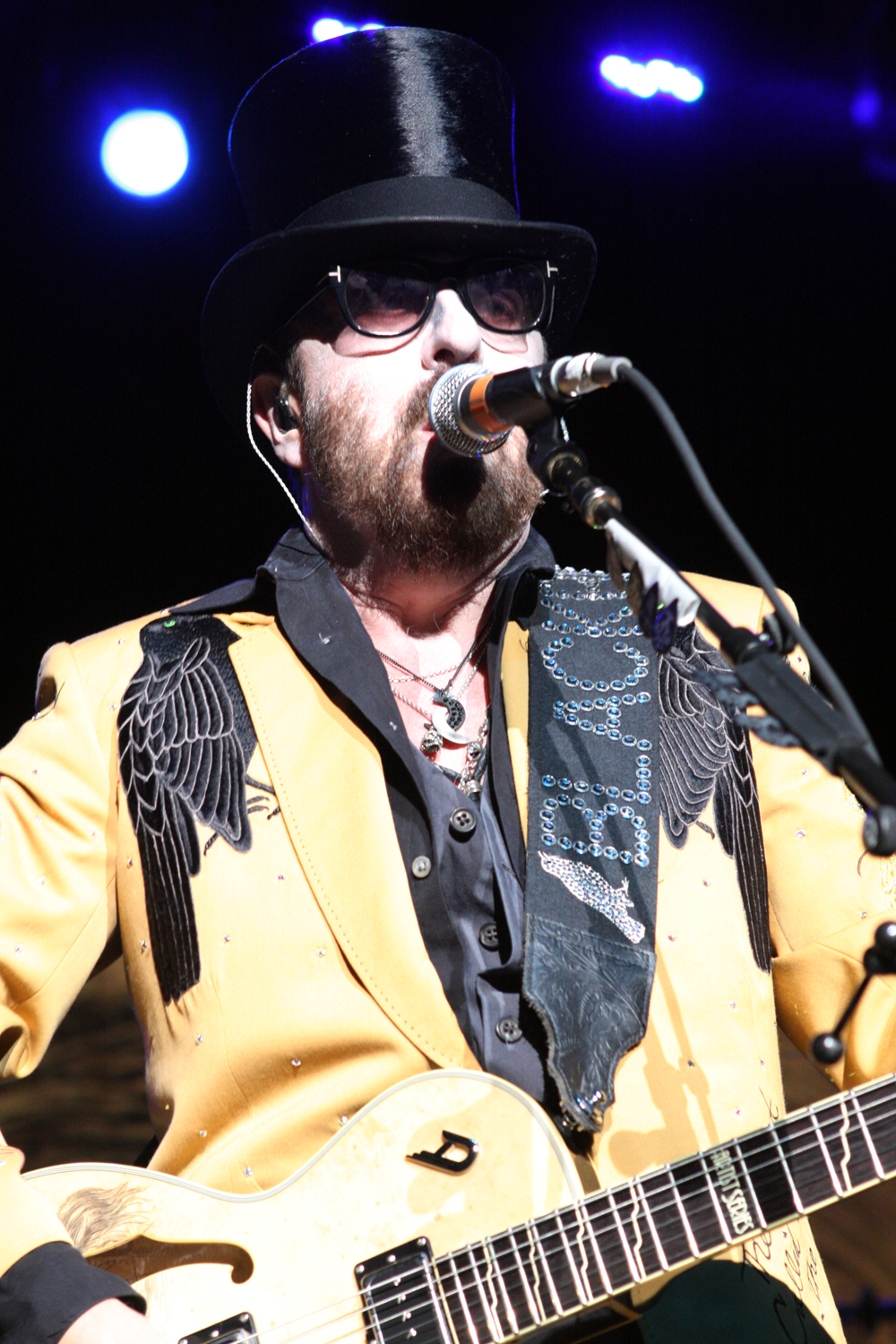
Dave Stewart, Worst Original Song co-winner

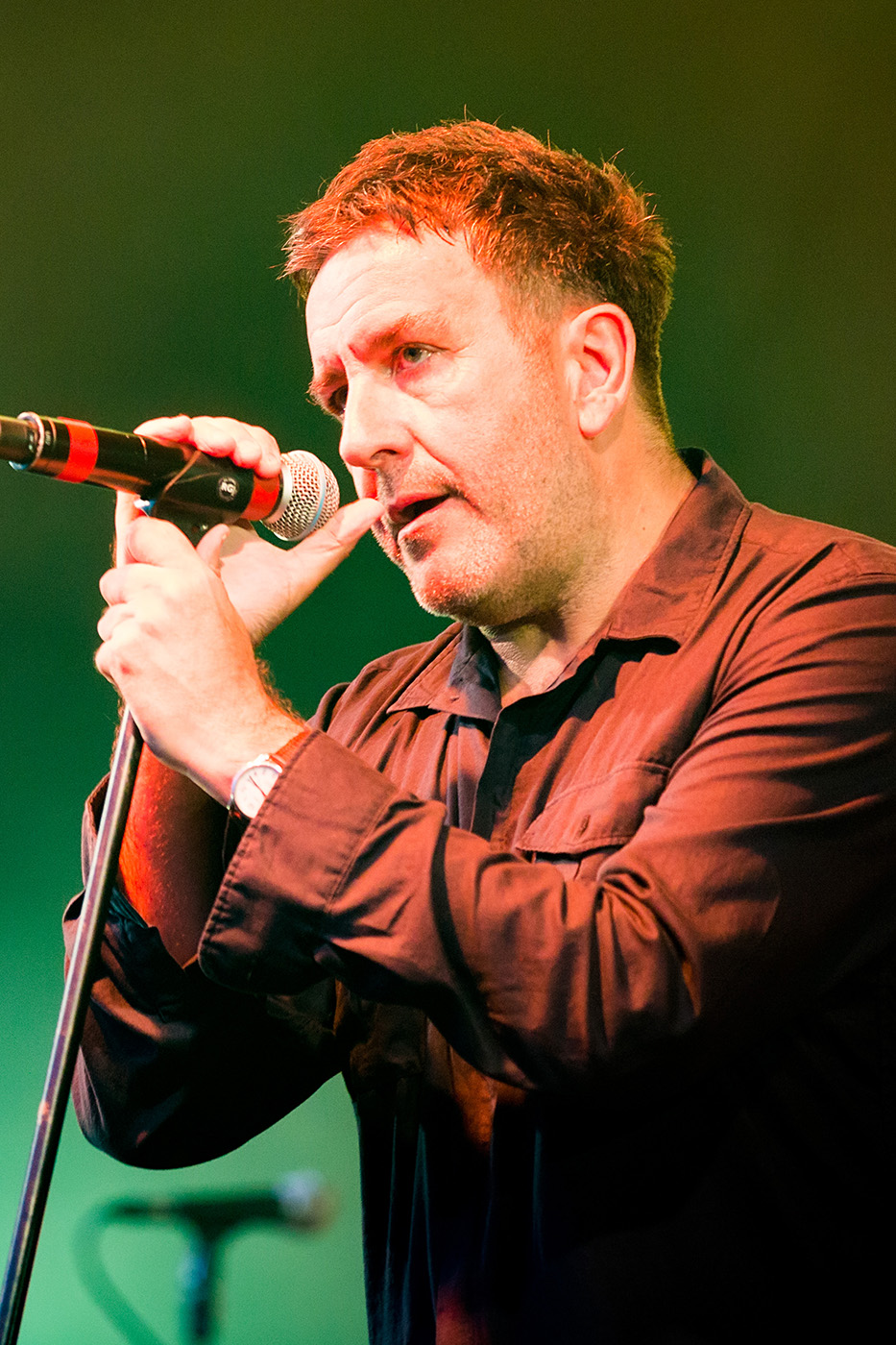
Terry Hall, Worst Original Song co-winner

Category	Recipient
Worst Picture	**Showgirls (MGM/UA)**
Worst Picture	Congo (Paramount)
Worst Picture	It's Pat (Touchstone)
Worst Picture	The Scarlet Letter (Hollywood Pictures)
Worst Picture	Waterworld (Universal)
Worst Actor	**Pauly Shore in Jury Duty as Tommy Collins**
Worst Actor	Kevin Costner in Waterworld as The Mariner
Worst Actor	Kyle MacLachlan in Showgirls as Zack Carey
Worst Actor	Keanu Reeves in Johnny Mnemonic and A Walk in the Clouds as Johnny Mnemonic and Paul Sutton (respectively)
Worst Actor	Sylvester Stallone in Assassins and Judge Dredd as Robert Rath and Judge Joseph Dredd (respectively)
Worst Actress	**Elizabeth Berkley in Showgirls as Nomi Malone**
Worst Actress	Cindy Crawford in Fair Game as Kate McQuean
Worst Actress	Demi Moore in The Scarlet Letter as Hester Prynne
Worst Actress	Julia Sweeney in It's Pat as Pat Riley
Worst Actress	Sean Young in Dr. Jekyll and Ms. Hyde as Helen Hyde
Worst Supporting Actor	**Dennis Hopper in Waterworld as The Deacon**
Worst Supporting Actor	Tim Curry in Congo as Herkermer Homolka
Worst Supporting Actor	Robert Davi in Showgirls as Al Torres
Worst Supporting Actor	Robert Duvall in The Scarlet Letter as Roger Chillingworth
Worst Supporting Actor	Alan Rachins in Showgirls as Tony Moss
Worst Supporting Actress	**Madonna in Four Rooms as Elspeth**
Worst Supporting Actress	Amy the Talking Gorilla in Congo
Worst Supporting Actress	Bo Derek in Tommy Boy as Beverly Barish
Worst Supporting Actress	Gina Gershon in Showgirls as Cristal Connors
Worst Supporting Actress	Lin Tucci in Showgirls as Henrietta Bazoom
Worst Screen Couple	**Any combination of two people (or two body parts!)** in **Showgirls**
Worst Screen Couple	William Baldwin and Cindy Crawford in Fair Game
Worst Screen Couple	Tim Daly and Sean Young in Dr. Jekyll and Ms. Hyde
Worst Screen Couple	Dave Foley and Julia Sweeney in It's Pat
Worst Screen Couple	Demi Moore and either Robert Duvall or Gary Oldman in The Scarlet Letter
Worst Director	**Paul Verhoeven for Showgirls**
Worst Director	Renny Harlin for Cutthroat Island
Worst Director	Roland Joffé for The Scarlet Letter
Worst Director	Frank Marshall for Congo
Worst Director	Kevin Reynolds (with More Than a Little Un-Asked Assistance from Kevin Costner) for Waterworld
Worst Screenplay	**Showgirls, written by Joe Eszterhas**
Worst Screenplay	Congo, screenplay by John Patrick Shanley, from the novel by Michael Crichton
Worst Screenplay	It's Pat, written by Jim Emerson & Stephen Hibbert & Julia Sweeney, based on characters created by Sweeney
Worst Screenplay	Jade, written by Joe Eszterhas
Worst Screenplay	The Scarlet Letter, screenplay by Douglas Day Stewart, freely adapted from the novel by Nathaniel Hawthorne
Worst New Star	**Elizabeth Berkley in Showgirls as Nomi Malone**
Worst New Star	Amy the Talking Gorilla in Congo
Worst New Star	David Caruso in Jade and Kiss of Death as David Corelli and Jimmy Kilmartin (respectively)
Worst New Star	Cindy Crawford in Fair Game as Kate McQuean
Worst New Star	Julia Sweeney in It's Pat and Stuart Saves His Family as Pat Riley and Mea C. (respectively)
Worst Original Song	**"Walk into the Wind" (also known as Love Theme from the Rape Scene) from Showgirls, adapted/covered originally written by David A. Stewart and Terry Hall**
Worst Original Song	"(Feel the) Spirit of Africa" from Congo, music by Jerry Goldsmith, lyrics by Lebo M
Worst Original Song	"Hold Me, Thrill Me, Kiss Me, Kill Me" from Batman Forever, music by U2, lyrics by Bono (also nominated for a Golden Globe)
Worst Remake Or Sequel	**The Scarlet Letter (Hollywood Pictures)**
Worst Remake Or Sequel	Ace Ventura: When Nature Calls (Warner Bros.)
Worst Remake Or Sequel	Dr. Jekyll and Ms. Hyde (Savoy Pictures)
Worst Remake Or Sequel	Showgirls (MGM/UA) (remake of both All About Eve and The Lonely Lady)
Worst Remake Or Sequel	Village of the Damned (Universal)

== Films with multiple nominations ==
These films garnered multiple nominations:

Nominations	Films
13	Showgirls
7	Congo
7	The Scarlet Letter
5	It's Pat
4	Waterworld
3	Dr. Jekyll and Ms. Hyde
3	Fair Game
2	Jade

== See also ==
- 1995 in film
- 68th Academy Awards
- 49th British Academy Film Awards
- 53rd Golden Globe Awards
- 2nd Screen Actors Guild Awards
