= Frank DiLeo =

American music industry executive

- Born: Frank Michael DiLeo; October 23, 1947; Pittsburgh, Pennsylvania, U.S.
- Died: August 24, 2011 (aged 63); North Lima, Ohio, U.S.
- Occupations: Music executive; music manager; actor
- Years active: 1967–2011
- Spouse: Linda DiLeo (m. 1976)
- Children: 2

Frank Michael DiLeo (October 23, 1947 – August 24, 2011) was an American music industry executive and actor. From 1984 to 1989, and again in 2009, he was the manager of the singer Michael Jackson. As an actor, he played gangster Tuddy Cicero in Martin Scorsese's Goodfellas and record company CEO Frankie "Mr. Big" Sharp in Wayne's World.

== Career ==
Frank DiLeo graduated from Central Catholic High School. DiLeo began his career in the music industry in the late 1960s, shortly after high school, as a rack jobber (distributing records to retail stores) in Pittsburgh. Following a number of brief, higher-profile jobs, he was hired as a promotion staffer in Cleveland by CBS Records subsidiary Epic Records in 1968. He promoted albums by The Hollies, Donovan and Sly & the Family Stone to local radio stations, and was later promoted to the company's regional office in Chicago. Circa 1969 he was "headhunted" by RCA Records in New York City, followed by a stint at Bell Records. After a year with Bell he "retired" from the music business and moved back to Pittsburgh. His return to the music industry was prompted by an "electrical fire" that destroyed his Pittsburgh home, for which his insurance carrier reportedly refused to pay out.

In 1979, CBS Records president Walter Yetnikoff hired his friend DiLeo to work for Epic Records in New York City as Vice President of National Promotion. Overseeing a staff of 65 people and a multi-million dollar budget, Frank helped guide Epic Records from a small $65 million company to a $250 million; during this period Epic outperformed its sister label Columbia Records for two years running. Artists signed to Epic included Quiet Riot, REO Speedwagon, Ozzy Osbourne, Gloria Estefan, Luther Vandross, Meat Loaf, Cyndi Lauper, Culture Club and above all Michael Jackson, among others. He was voted executive of the year for Epic Records, received over 80 gold and platinum awards, and was credited for taking Epic Records from the number-fourteen label in the U.S. market to number two.

In 1984, after the record-setting success of his Thriller album, Jackson asked DiLeo to take over as his manager. DiLeo was the executive producer for the full-length movie Moonwalker, wrote and executive produced three Pepsi-Cola commercials (including negotiating a landmark endorsement deal), and eight music videos including the Grammy winning video "Leave Me Alone". DiLeo managed Jackson's Bad tour, and the Jackson family's Victory Tour. DiLeo managed Jackson until February 14, 1989, when Jackson accused DiLeo of tampering with money. He worked with Jackson again in 2009 for Jackson's This Is It concert series. DiLeo attended Jackson's memorial service at the Ronald Reagan UCLA Medical Center on June 25, 2009. DiLeo told David Gest: "I got to spend a few moments alone with him, I told him what I thought, before kissing him on the head and saying my last goodbye."

DiLeo is referenced in Sheryl Crow's "The Na-Na Song", with the lines "Clarence Thomas organ grinder Frank DiLeo's dong / Maybe if I'd let him I'd have had a hit song." Crow and DiLeo were acquainted when Crow worked as a backup singer on Jackson's Bad tour. Dileo propositioned Crow and said he would ruin her career if she did not comply. DiLeo also managed the careers of Taylor Dayne, Jodeci, Laura Branigan, and Bon Jovi guitarist Richie Sambora, and had worked with Prince on several projects.

DiLeo founded Dileo Entertainment Group, a company located in Nashville, Tennessee. The company is focused on managing up-and-coming artists as well as establishing a publishing company in Nashville with partners Mark Lamica and Quincy Krashna, with whom also co-managed Michael Jackson and his comeback tour along with numerous projects including several plays. DiLeo also wrote a tell-all biography of his years in the music industry, of which Mark & Quincy have the transcripts and original copies.

In 1991, Youngstown, Ohio Mob Boss Joseph "Little Joey" Naples was killed outside a home he was having built in Beaver Township, Mahoning County. He was driving DiLeo's Ford Mustang Convertible when the shooting happened. Naples was a member of the Pittsburgh crime family, also known as the LaRocca crime family in Pittsburgh. He appeared in six major motion pictures. His film credits include Goodfellas, Wayne's World and Wayne's World 2.

== Death ==
In 2011, DiLeo suffered a heart attack and was treated at Cedars Sinai Medical Center in Los Angeles. He died on August 24, 2011, in a care facility outside Youngstown, Ohio, after experiencing complications following heart surgery. He was 63 years old.

== Filmography ==
=== Film ===
Frank DiLeo's film credits with year of release, film titles and roles
Year	Title	Role	Notes
1988	Moonwalker	Jack	Segment: "Come Together"
1990	Goodfellas	Tuddy Cicero	
1992	Wayne's World	Frankie "Mr. Big" Sharp	
1993	Wayne's World 2	Frankie "Mr. Big" Sharp	
1995	Kiss of Death	Big Junior's Friend	Final film role
2009	Michael Jackson: This Is It	Himself	Documentary
2011	Michael Jackson: The Life of an Icon	Himself	Documentary
2024	The Greatest Night in Pop	Himself	Documentary

=== Television ===
Frank DiLeo's television credits with year of release, film titles and roles
Year	Title	Role	Notes
1993	Tribeca	Super	Episode: "The Loft"
1994	New York Undercover	Tommy T	Episode: "Mate"

== Sources ==
- Dannen, Fredric (1991). Hit Men: Powerbrokers and Fast Money Inside the Music Business. Vintage Books: UK
