= God Said Ha! =

1998 filmed performance

- Directed by: Julia Sweeney
- Written by: Julia Sweeney
- Produced by: Rana Joy Glickman
- Starring: Julia Sweeney; Quentin Tarantino
- Cinematography: John Hora
- Edited by: Fabienne Rawley
- Music by: Anthony Marinelli
- Distributed by: Miramax Films
- Release date: March 14, 1998 (SXSW)
- Running time: 85 minutes
- Country: United States
- Language: English

God Said Ha! is a 1998 filmed performance of Julia Sweeney's one-woman play of the same name. Written and directed by Sweeney, the film premiered at the South by Southwest Film Festival on March 14, 1998. The play focuses on Sweeney's recollections of when her brother was diagnosed with cancer.

== Synopsis ==
The film is a monologue based on Sweeney's one woman stage show of the same name where Sweeney discusses her memories of her brother Michael getting diagnosed with lymphoma and her own personal experiences when she discovered that she also had cancer.

== Cast ==
- Julia Sweeney as herself
- Quentin Tarantino as himself

== Production ==
Quentin Tarantino co-starred in the production, while also serving as an executive producer. He previously performed uncredited rewrites on Sweeney's film It's Pat (1994).

== Reception ==
Critical reception for God Said Ha! has been predominantly positive. On Rotten Tomatoes the film holds a rating of 86% based on 22 reviews. The site's consensus states: "God Said, Ha! plumbs poignant depths, but Julia Sweeney's sharp, graceful wit makes this one-woman monologue a wise, big-hearted burst of uplifting – and perhaps therapeutic – entertainment."

=== Awards ===
- Golden Space Needle for Best Film at the Seattle International Film Festival (1998, won)
- Audience Award at the New York Comedy Festival (1998, won)
