= It's Pat =

1994 American comedy film

- Theatrical release poster
- Directed by: Adam Bernstein
- Screenplay by: Julia Sweeney; Jim Emerson; Stephen Hibbert; Quentin Tarantino (Note: uncredited rewrites)
- Based on: The character by Julia Sweeney
- Produced by: Charles B. Wessler
- Starring: Julia Sweeney; Dave Foley; Charles Rocket
- Cinematography: Jeff Jur
- Edited by: Norman Hollyn
- Music by: Mark Mothersbaugh
- Production company: Touchstone Pictures
- Distributed by: Buena Vista Pictures Distribution
- Release date: August 19, 1994 (United States)
- Running time: 78 minutes
- Country: United States
- Language: English
- Budget: $8 million
- Box office: $60,822

It's Pat is a 1994 American slapstick comedy film directed by Adam Bernstein and starring Julia Sweeney, Dave Foley, Charles Rocket, and Kathy Griffin. The film was based on the Saturday Night Live (SNL) character Pat, created by Sweeney, an androgynous misfit whose gender is never revealed. Foley plays Pat's partner Chris, and Rocket, another SNL alumnus, plays Pat's neighbor Kyle.

It's Pat was released by Buena Vista Pictures Distribution on August 19, 1994. The film was released in only 33 theatres in three cities in the United States. It's Pat was universally panned by critics, and bombed at the box office, only grossing $60,822 against its $8 million budget.

== Plot ==
Pat Riley is a chubby, whiny, and obnoxious job-hopper of indeterminate gender who is searching for a steady foundation in life. Pat falls in love with Chris (whose gender is also unrevealed to the audience) and the two get engaged. Meanwhile, Pat's neighbor Kyle develops an unhealthy obsession with identifying Pat's gender and begins stalking Pat. He sends a tape of Pat performing karaoke to a television show called America's Creepiest People, which catches the attention of the band Ween, who feature Pat in one of their performances, playing the sousaphone. Pat and Chris break up when Pat learns that Ween intended only to use Pat for one gig.

Kyle steals Pat's laptop containing Pat's diary and tries to coerce Pat into revealing the computer's password so he can access the files. When Pat only answers that it's a word in the dictionary, Kyle begins manually trying every word. He eventually succeeds with the password "zythum" (an Egyptian malt beer) and reads the diary. However, he does not find the answer to his question and finally snaps.

Meanwhile, a gang of thugs with the same goal begin harassing Pat, who becomes distraught over the thugs' use of the term "androgynous". Pat complains to Kathy, a friend who is a therapist and host of a radio talk show. When Pat reacts acerbically to call-in listeners, the station fires Kathy and replaces her with Pat.

Kyle calls into Pat's radio show saying he has Pat's laptop, and sets up a meeting at the Ripley's Believe It or Not! Museum to retrieve it. Pat arrives to find Kyle dressed precisely like Pat. Kyle demands that Pat strip naked, but Pat runs off into a Ween concert. Pat falls after Kyle corners Pat on a catwalk. Pat's pants get torn off by a hook, and Pat is lowered with Pat's genitalia exposed to the cheering concert audience, but not to Kyle or the viewer. Security guards subsequently take Kyle away. Pat then runs to see Chris, just as Chris is leaving on an ocean liner. In an epilogue, Pat and Chris marry.

During the end credits, audio can be heard of Kathy hosting her radio show again, and the first caller is Kyle, whose obsession with Pat has driven him to cross-dressing.

== Cast ==
- Julia Sweeney as Pat Riley
- Dave Foley as Chris
- Charles Rocket as Kyle Jacobsen
- Kathy Griffin as Kathy Griffin
- Julie Hayden as Stacy Jacobsen
- Timothy Stack as Doctor
- Mary Scheer as Nurse
- Beverly Leech as Mrs. Riley
- Tim Meadows as KVIB-FM manager
- Phil LaMarr as Stage manager
- Larry Hankin as Postal supervisor
- Kathy Najimy as Tippy
- Jerry Tondo as Sushi chef
- Mitch Pileggi as Concert guard
- Camille Paglia as Camille Paglia
- Andrew Weiss as Andrew Weiss
- John Weiss as Ween drummer
- Dean Ween as Dean Ween
- Gene Ween as Gene Ween

== Production ==
In January 1993, it was announced 20th Century Fox was developing The Pat Movie based on the Saturday Night Live character Pat starring Julia Sweeney. In order to make the movie, Fox had to negotiate the rights of the character from NBC (though Sweeney herself possessed certain rights regarding the character). Saturday Night Live producer Lorne Michaels had no involvement with the film which was produced by Charles B. Wessler. After six months worth of work which included a script with input from Quentin Tarantino that involved Pat being pursued by a relentless suitor, Fox grew frustrated with the lack of a workable script and put the film into turnaround. Following Fox dropping the film, it was reported both Disney and New Line Cinema had begun bidding on the project. Disney eventually won the rights and produced the film through their Touchstone Pictures label with filming taking place in Los Angeles in August.

The film was written by Sweeney, Jim Emerson (Sweeney's friend from their days with The Groundlings), and Sweeney's former husband Stephen Hibbert. While at the Groundlings, Emerson suggested that the character Pat, at the time a "character based on annoying co-workers who don't leave you alone", be made androgynous.

Three months before the film's release, Sweeney commented on her initial reluctance to do a film based on Pat:

I resisted it completely. I just didn't know how we could make it last for two hours. But 20th Century Fox was really keen; our producer was really keen. So we thought, OK, we'll write the script. And after three months, we fell madly in love with the script. Unfortunately, Fox did not.

== Release ==
The film was given a limited regional theatrical release between August 19 and 26, 1994 in the areas of Seattle, Spokane, and Houston before its release on home video on March 28, 1995

== Reception ==
On the review aggregator website Rotten Tomatoes, 0% of 11 critics' reviews are positive, with an average rating of 2.5/10. Metacritic, which uses a weighted average, assigned the film a score of 18 out of 100, based on 6 critics, indicating "overwhelming dislike".

Variety magazine called the film "shockingly unfunny", noting that Sweeney had "perversely turned the relatively harmless TV character into a boorish, egotistical creep for the bigscreen", the film's "only really funny bit is Sexual Personae author Camille Paglia, deftly parodying herself, commenting on the significance of Pat's androgyny". Kevin Thomas of the Los Angeles Times wrote: "It's Pat offers a simple message of self-acceptance, asserting that what counts is who you are rather than what your gender may or may not be. The trouble is that its telling is truly terrible." TV Guide called it "yet another tepid film comedy based on a recurring Saturday Night Live sketch". They conclude "the story goes nowhere, and if the film ran longer than its 80 minutes, it would have become too tedious to tolerate".

The film opened in only three cities (33 theaters). Its total gross was $60,822. As a result, the film was pulled from theaters after its opening weekend.

=== Accolades ===
It's Pat was a multiple third place nominee at the 16th Golden Raspberry Awards, though the film's cast and crew lost in every category to Showgirls:

- Worst Actress - Julia Sweeney
- Worst New Star - Julia Sweeney
- Worst Picture - Charles B. Wessler
- Worst Screen Couple - Dave Foley and Julia Sweeney
- Worst Screenplay - Jim Emerson, Stephen Hibbert, and Julia Sweeney

At the 1995 Stinkers Bad Movie Awards, the film was nominated for Worst Picture; the film lost to Showgirls. However, Julia Sweeney did win Worst Actress for this film. Later, the Stinkers released their user-constructed "100 Years, 100 Stinkers" list in which visitors determined the 100 worst movies of the 20th century. It's Pat ranked in the bottom 20 at #7.

== Soundtrack ==
No soundtrack album was released. The songs from It's Pat are listed below as shown within the film's credits:

1. "It's Pat Theme" - Christina Zander, Julia Sweeney, Cheryl Hardwick
2. "Walz Pompadour" (written by Tom Elliot)
3. "Poem of Crickets" (written by 長沢 勝俊 (Katsutoshi Nagasawa))
4. "Delta Swelter" - Gary Fletcher, Paul Jones, Dave Kelly, Tom McGuinness, Bob Townsend
5. "The Cool Look" - Johnny Hawksworth
6. "Brain Women" - Mark Mothersbaugh
7. "Everybody Loves Somebody" - Julia Sweeney
8. "Dude (Looks Like a Lady)" - Aerosmith
9. "Le Freak" - Julia Sweeney
10. "Paero" - Phillippe Lhommt, Jacques Mercier
11. "Pork Roll, Egg and Cheese" - Ween
12. "How's It Gonna Be" - The Dead Milkmen
13. "Bring It to Me" - Collective Thoughts
14. "Don't Get 2 Close (2 My Fantasy)" - Ween
15. "You're the Best Thing That Ever Happened to Me" - Gladys Knight & the Pips
