= Wayne's World 2 =

1993 film by Stephen Surjik

- Theatrical release poster
- Directed by: Stephen Surjik
- Written by: Mike Myers; Bonnie Turner; Terry Turner
- Based on: Characters by Mike Myers
- Produced by: Lorne Michaels
- Starring: Mike Myers; Dana Carvey; Christopher Walken; Tia Carrere; Ralph Brown
- Cinematography: Francis Kenny
- Edited by: Malcolm Campbell
- Music by: Carter Burwell
- Production company: Broadway Video
- Distributed by: Paramount Pictures
- Release date: December 10, 1993
- Running time: 95 minutes
- Country: United States
- Language: English
- Budget: $30 million
- Box office: $72 million

Wayne's World 2 is a 1993 American comedy film directed by Stephen Surjik and starring Mike Myers and Dana Carvey as hosts of a public-access television cable television show in Aurora, Illinois. The film is the sequel to Wayne's World (1992), which was itself adapted from a sketch on NBC's Saturday Night Live.

Wayne's World 2 was released by Paramount Pictures on December 10, 1993. The film received mixed to positive reviews from critics and grossed $72 million.

== Plot ==
Rock and roll fans Wayne Campbell and Garth Algar celebrate their moving to a new factory loft home with an early edition of their public-access television show, Wayne's World, and then head out with their crew to an Aerosmith concert, where Wayne and Garth have backstage passes. They meet with Wayne's girlfriend Cassandra Wong (lead singer and bassist of the band Crucial Taunt) and are introduced to her new producer, Bobby Cahn. The duo is then denied further access backstage despite having passes. That night, Wayne has a dream in which he meets Jim Morrison and a "weird naked Indian" in a desert. Morrison convinces Wayne that his destiny is to organize a major music festival. Wayne and Garth dub the concert "Waynestock" (a pun on "Woodstock") and hire a former roadie, Del Preston. Their early attempts to sign bands (Aerosmith, Pearl Jam, and Van Halen are mentioned off the cuff by Wayne) and sell tickets fail, and Wayne wonders if the endeavor is futile.

Bobby tries to pull Cassandra away from Illinois and Wayne and move to Los Angeles. Wayne becomes suspicious of Bobby's ulterior motives and spies on them. They spot Wayne and he flees with Garth and their friends while Bobby chases them. Wayne and company evade Bobby after performing an impromptu performance of "Y.M.C.A" in a gay club. After Wayne admits to spying on her, Cassandra dumps him and becomes engaged to Bobby. Wayne becomes more determined to make Waynestock a success and wants to get Cassandra back. Meanwhile, Garth meets a beautiful woman named Honey Hornée. Later, Hornée attempts to manipulate Garth into killing her ex-husband, but Garth ends the relationship.

Tickets are sold for Waynestock, but no bands arrive. Leaving Garth to keep the rowdy crowd in check, Wayne disrupts Cassandra's wedding before escaping the ceremony with her. They get back together in a parody of the finale of The Graduate. Meanwhile, Garth has stage fright during the concert, and the crowd grows impatient. Wayne returns to find the bands have still not arrived.

Wayne and Garth consult Morrison in the dream desert, who says that the bands will not come and that they tried. Unable to return, they become lost in the desert and die of thirst. Finding this unacceptable, Wayne and Garth reenact the ending of Thelma & Louise, driving their car off a cliff while trying to find the bands. Finally, Wayne and Garth admit that they have to end the film with a standard happy ending in which the bands arrive, and Waynestock succeeds. Morrison tells Wayne that he needed to organize Waynestock to learn that Cassandra loves him for who he is, and also that adulthood requires one to take responsibility while being able to find fun in life. Bobby arrives at Waynestock to pursue Cassandra, but is prevented from entering.

In a mid-credits scene, the entire park is covered with trash after the concert. The "weird naked Indian" begins to cry, but he cheers up when Wayne and Garth promise to clean up.

== Cast ==
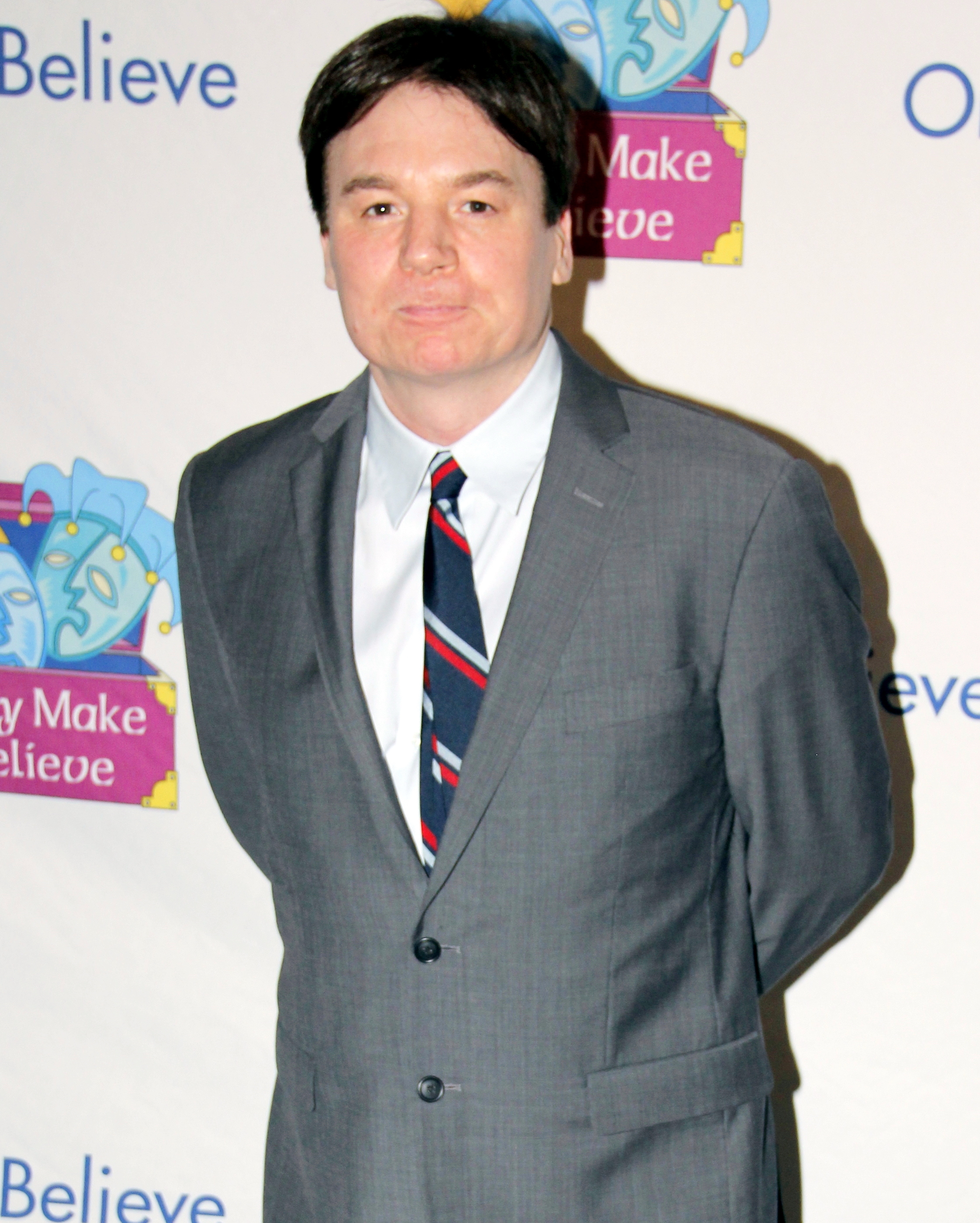
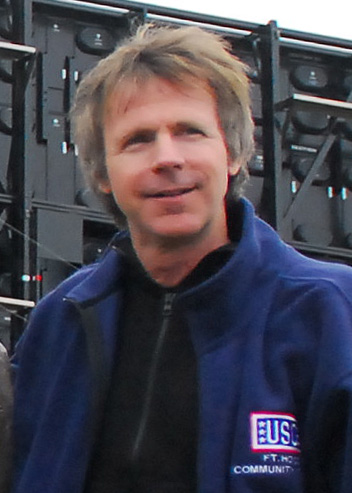
Mike Myers (in 2011) and Dana Carvey (in 2009)
- Mike Myers as Wayne Campbell
- Dana Carvey as Garth Algar
- Tia Carrere as Cassandra Wong
- Christopher Walken as Robert G. "Bobby" Cahn
- Kevin Pollak as Jerry Segel
- Ralph Brown as Del Preston
- James Hong as Jeff Wong, Cassandra's father and martial arts expert
  - Jim Downey as the dubbed voice of Jeff Wong
- Kim Basinger as Honey Hornée
- Chris Farley as Milton, an aimless friend of Wayne and Garth's
- Ed O'Neill as Glen
- Gavin Grazer as Scott
- Michael A. Nickles as Jim Morrison
- Larry Sellers as The Weird Naked Indian
- Frank DiLeo as Frankie 'Mr. Big' Sharp
- Lee Tergesen as Terry; Wayne and Garth's bud & camera man
- Dan Bell as Neil; Wayne and Garth's bud & camera man
- Scott Coffey as a Metalhead
- Drew Barrymore as Bjergen Kjergen
- Olivia d'Abo as Betty Jo
- Charlton Heston as the "good actor" gas station attendant who replaces the "bad actor" Al Hansen
- Jay Leno as himself
- Heather Locklear as herself
- Ted McGinley as "Mr. Scream"
- Tim Meadows as Sammy Davis Jr.
- Robert Smigel and Bob Odenkirk as nerds backstage at the concert
- Bobby Slayton as the Watermelon Guy
- Harry Shearer as "Handsome" Dan
- Rip Taylor as himself
- Members of Aerosmith:
  - Steven Tyler as himself (lead vocalist)
  - Joe Perry as himself (lead guitar)
  - Brad Whitford as himself (rhythm guitar)
  - Tom Hamilton as himself (bass guitar)
  - Joey Kramer as himself (drummer)
- Rich Fulcher as Garth's body double when they "travel to London"

== Production ==
Penelope Spheeris, who directed the first film, believes that Myers encouraged the studio not to have her back for the sequel due to personality conflicts with Myers during the making of the first film. She went on to direct another TV-to-big-screen film adaptation, The Beverly Hillbillies instead. She was replaced by Stephen Surjik for the sequel.

Myers' original script for Wayne's World 2 had Wayne and Garth forming their own country and seceding from the US after finding an ancient scroll, in a story taken from the 1949 British comedy Passport to Pimlico. This version was well into pre-production before it came to light that the studio had no idea the script was based on a previous film and thus had not obtained the rights to Passport to Pimlico. Production was immediately halted—director Surjik said: "I could hear the chainsaws literally chopping the sets down." Studio executive Sherry Lansing was reportedly furious with Myers and threatened to ruin his life and career if he did not immediately produce a new script.

The character of Del Preston, played by Ralph Brown, is an extension of his Danny character from the cult film Withnail and I. The character was a late addition to the script, and came about after Dana Carvey saw a repertory screening of Withnail and I in Los Angeles. Due to the age discrepancy between the two characters, they landed on Del being a "spiritual reprisal" of Danny, rather than a direct representation of the same character.

Kim Basinger did three days' worth of work on Wayne's World 2. When discussing being approached to do the project, Basinger said "I never saw Wayne's World so I didn't know what it was about. But Dana Carvey just clean-called me and he was very sweet and sincere. He said, "We're really going to have fun, please do this with me." At first I said no, but he kept calling. It was just a blast. Dana's wonderful. It was a little gift to be given in the middle of the year."

Basinger noted that when Carvey approached her with the part, he refused to take no for an answer. When she showed the script to her then husband, Alec Baldwin, he loved it and told her that she must be in the film. According to her, the echo effect clinched her decision to take part in the movie.

She said when describing her character, "I'm this little character that they call Honey Hornée. ... I don't want to give away the whole plot, but I want to say that it's Garth's first screen kiss. Oh, and it's wonderful and (Dana Carvey) wrote it. He was magic for three days." And when asked whose hair was longer, hers or Garth's, Basinger said with a laugh, "You know, It was so funny, we sorta looked like each other. We're like Harold and Maude; we're kinda this odd couple. But it works. You'd just love to follow these two people around the grocery store and see what they buy and wonder what they're gonna do with it. That's the kind of characters these two are."

Basinger also said about working with Dana Carvey, "I honestly thought I was going to get fired because I could not keep a straight face. I never really looked into his eyes. I could never do it. I would focus on a piece of his hair and say" Be really cool Kim". And then when he started to kiss me, I just came apart." Dana Carvey joked that making out with Kim Basinger was just awful. He added that he felt very bad for her because "kissing Garth is like kissing a moving truck. The guy is so nervous, he's always weaving around".

The entire subplot of Garth finding himself in the clutches of a potentially dangerous femme fatale has drawn comparisons to the 1944 film Double Indemnity starring Fred MacMurray and Barbara Stanwyck. In that film, MacMurray plays an insurance salesman while Stanwyck plays a provocative housewife who wishes her husband were dead.

The laundromat where Garth first meets Honey Hornée was located at 6803 Melrose Avenue in Los Angeles and Honey's apartment building was located at 5023 Maytime Lane in Culver City, California. When Garth is floating in the air kissing Honey in said apartment, a black wire that's holding Dana Carvey against the background of the white lampshade is visible.

== Reception ==
Wayne's World 2 received mixed-to-positive reviews. On Rotten Tomatoes, the film has a 60% approval rating, based on 45 reviews, with an average rating of 5.8/10. The website's critical consensus reads, "The characters are still endearing, but the jokes in Wayne's World 2 are more hit-and-miss the second time around". Audiences polled by CinemaScore gave the film an average grade of "A−", the same grade as its predecessor.

Film critic Roger Ebert of the Chicago Sun-Times gave the film three out of four stars, and wrote that Wayne and Garth are "impossible to dislike".

=== Box office ===
Wayne's World 2 earned $13.5 million during its opening weekend. Although it was intended to be a Christmas season blockbuster, Wayne's World 2 did not receive the box office intake nor positive fan reaction that the first film did. It grossed $48 million in the United States and Canada and $24 million internationally for a worldwide total of $72 million, much less than the original film's gross of over $180 million. Wayne's World 2 also suffered from competition from other holiday season blockbusters such as Mrs. Doubtfire, Schindler's List, and The Pelican Brief.

=== Legacy ===
Beginning in 2006, DirecTV began a series of commercials in which characters from popular movies and television shows break the fourth wall to tout the service's picture quality and the number of channels available in high definition. Instead of using CGI the original actors normally reprise their roles on recreated sets, and resulting footage is mixed with the original scenes. One such ad featured Kim Basinger reprising her role as Honey Hornée from Wayne's World 2.

== See also ==
- Wayne's World
- Wayne's World (film)
- List of Saturday Night Live feature films
