= List of 1996 This American Life episodes =

In 1996, there were 40 original This American Life episodes; the first nine were broadcast under the original name of the program Your Radio Playhouse.

- Episode 8 – "New Year"

Air Date: 1996-01-03
Description: Stories that reflect back on 1995

- Episode 9 – "Julia Sweeney"

Air Date: 1996-01-10
Description: When comedian Julia Sweeney and her brother both got cancer, she decided to tell the story the best way she knew how: in a comedy club. It might seem like a strange choice, but what resulted is halfway between standup comedy and true-life diary entries.
- Prologue
- Act 1: Julia's Brother Gets Cancer – Julia Sweeney
- Act 2: Julia Gets Cancer – Julia Sweeney
- The Kinks, Complicated Life
- Willie Nelson, These Are Difficult Times

- Episode 10 – "Double Lives"

Air Date: 1996-01-17
Description: Susan Bergman's father was a family man, head of the church choir, and, secretly, having sex with men. He died before his children had a chance to really talk to him about what they should make of his hidden life. When Bergman wrote a book about her family's experience, other gay men tried to explain her father's actions to her. That, and other stories of parents deceiving their children.

- Episode 11 – "Enemies"

Air Date: 1996-01-24
Description: A story of a friendship between two adolescent boys that was destroyed through the manipulative acts of one of them.
- Act 1: Dave's Love
- Act 2: Dave's Hate
- Act 3: Dave Today
- Act 4: Another Dave – David Sedaris

- Episode 12 – "Animals"

Air Date: 1996-01-31
Description: Stories about the animalness of animals, the irreducible ways in which they are not human.
- Prologue
- Act 1: Food Chain in a New York Apartment – Paul Tough
- Shonen Knife, Insect Collector
- Act 2: More Animals Eating Other Animals
- Kathleen on the Carpet, a radio play by David Sedaris, performed by the Pinetree Gang
- Lena Horne, Rocky Raccoon
- Act 3: The Moment Humans Stopped Being Animals – Scott Carrier
- Louis Prima, I Wanna Be Like You, from Disney's The Jungle Book

- Episode 13 – "Love"

Air Date: 1996-02-07
Description: Explorations of the dream of true love ... and the difficulties with achieving and maintaining that dream.
- Prologue
- Al Green, Love and Happiness
- Act 1: Yearning
- Act 2: Sex
- Madonna, Forbidden Love
- Act 3: A Wedding
- Ready, an original song performed by kids at Daniel J. Nellum Youth Services in Chicago

- Episode 14 – "Accidental Documentaries"

Air Date: 1996-02-21
Description: Stories made from old tapes found in various places, including a "letter on tape" found in a Salvation Army thrift store. Host Ira Glass with tapes of his father on the radio, circa 1956. And radio producer Nora Moreno with tapes of her father, a Spanish broadcasting pioneer in America. Her mother fell in love with him over the radio, with tragic results.
- Prologue
- Act 1: Berrian Springs Michigan, Circa 1967 – Davis family tapes
- James Brown, It's a Man's World
- Act 2: Baltimore, Circa 1956 – Ira Glass plays tapes of his father, Barry Glass, as a radio deejay in the 1950s
- Nat King Cole, Personal Possession
- Act 3: Chicago, in the 1960s – Nora Moreno
- José Alfredo Jiménez, El Rey

- Episode 15 – "Dawn"

Air Date: 1996-02-28
Description: Writer Jack Hitt goes on a search for a mysterious neighbor from his childhood in Charleston, South Carolina, and stumbles onto an epic story of the Old South, the New South, gender confusion, Chihuahuas, and changing values in American journalism.
- Prologue
- Digital Underground, ?
- Act 1: Dawn – Jack Hitt tells the story of Gordon Langley Hall, a.k.a. Dawn Langley Hall Simmons
- Marlene Dietrich, ?
- Act 2 – from the 1998 rebroadcast of this episode, Jack Hitt discusses his new conclusions two-and-a-half years after his first report of the story

- Episode 16 – "Economy"

Air Date: 1996-03-14
Description: Stories of politics, the economy, and the big picture.

- Episode 17 – "Name Change/No Theme"

Air Date: 1996-03-21
Description: First show as This American Life.

- Episode 18 – "Liars"

Air Date: 1996-03-28
Description: April first is the one day of the year when we're allowed to enjoy deceiving others. But April Fools' Day is for amateur deceivers. The real pros are the people who can't control their lying, who lie without even knowing what the truth is. Everyone's known someone like this, but it's a topic that's only rarely studied or discussed publicly. Journalist and TAL contributing editor Margy Rochlin co-hosts.

- Episode 19 – "Rich Guys"

Air Date: 1996-04-12
Description: Men who had comfortable decent lives, yet decided to do something wild and eccentric with their lives instead.

- Episode 20 – "From a Distance"

Air Date: 1996-04-19
Description: Stories of hero worship, of people admiring someone from afar, and trying to get closer to them.

- Episode 21 – "Factions"

Air Date: 1996-04-26
Description: A show about something most people have gone through. Friends get together to start a business, start a church, do political action together. And after a while, they start fighting and split up. We hear three true stories.

- Episode 22 – "Adult Children"

Air Date: 1996-05-03
Description: Stories of the difficult relationships between parents and their grown children, including two long stories from Sandra Tsing Loh about her father.

- Episode 23 – "Drama Bug"

Air Date: 1996-05-10
Description: Stories of the people who fall for a life in the theater.

- Episode 24 – "Teenaged Girls"

Air Date: 1996-05-24
Description: Stories of girls who have to figure out how they're going to act when the ground rules are constantly shifting.

- Episode 25 – "Basketball"

Air Date: 1996-06-07
Description: A set of documentary stories, radio essays and monologues about basketball, the Chicago Bulls, and their grip on Chicagoans' hearts and lives during the NBA Playoffs. These are unusual stories about people in the throes of love for basketball, including a story about the dreams about the Bulls Chicagoans have while sleeping.

- Episode 26 – "Father's Day '96"

Air Date: 1996-06-14
Description: Ira's own father Barry Glass co-hosts this special father's day edition of the show.

- Episode 27 – "The Cruelty of Children"

Air Date: 1996-06-21
Description: Stories about kids being mean to each other.

- Episode 28 – "Detectives"

Air Date: 1996-07-12
Description: Writer David Sedaris recalls the days when his mother and sister played armchair detective—until a very odd crime wave hit within their own home. Plus, host Ira Glass goes out on surveillance with a real-life private eye.

- Episode 29 – "Bob Dole"

Air Date: 1996-07-19
Description: Unusual perspectives on the presumptive Republican nominee.

- Episode 30 – "Obsession"

Air Date: 1996-07-26
Description: Stories of obsession and compulsion. What happens when a little idea starts to control you. Co-hosted by Paul Tough.

- Episode 31 – "When You Talk About Music"

Air Date: 1996-08-09
Description: Stories of people whose lives are transformed by music.

- Episode 32 – "Republican Convention"

Air Date: 1996-08-16
Description: More campaign diaries from The New Republic's Michael Lewis.

- Episode 33 – "A Night at the Wiener's Circle"

Air Date: 1996-08-23
- This episode is about the unique culture in a Chicago fast food restaurant.
- Prologue – New introduction recorded in 2006, saying this show was never broadcast nationally – Ira Glass
- Ira records various colorful personalities at the Wiener's Circle.
- Act Two: "The Customer" by Beau O'Reilly.
- Act Three: "A Parable of Politics" by Shirley Jahad.
- Act Four: "Fast Food Heart" by Cassandra Smith.

- Episode 34 – "Democratic Convention"

Air Date: 1996-08-30
Description: Unusual stories from the 1996 Democratic Convention in Chicago, with scenes and moments not documented elsewhere.

- Episode 35 – "Fall Clearance Sale"

Air Date: 1996-09-06
Description: Evocative, funny emotional stories collected over the last few months that haven't fit into any of our regular "theme" shows.
- Ira Glass at the Navy Pier
- David Sedaris recollections from the nudist camp
- "Haiku stories" by Scott Carrier
- Zoofilia, the stallion
- Carmen Detzell Her grandmother's beliefs and the guitar player

- Episode 36 – "Letters"

Air Date: 1996-09-20
Description: Open Mic at the Lunar Cabaret. Host Ira Glass and playwright David Hauptschein took out advertisements in Chicago inviting people to come to a small theater with letters they've received, sent or found. People came for two nights and read their letters onstage. Some were funny. Some were poignant. They told a wide range of stories: a heartfelt letter from prison, a hilariously pretentious job letter sent to the New Yorker magazine, a ringingly sincere teenage "should we be more than friends" letter. Four hours of letters were recorded in all. These were edited down to an hour of letters, with a few unusual songs about letters thrown in.

- Episode 37 – "The Job That Takes Over Your Life"

Air Date: 1996-09-27
Description: Radio producer Scott Carrier quit his job at a low moment in his life. His wife left him and took the kids. And he got a job interviewing schizophrenics for some medical researchers. After doing it a while, he began to wonder if he was a schizophrenic himself. And more stories.
- Prologue – Ira Glass; his job.
- Act 1: The Test – Scott Carrier (later published in his book Running After Antelope); interviewing individuals with Schizophrenia.
- Merle Haggard, Workin' Man's Blues
- Act 2: Tribe – Peter Clowney interviews cast members of a production of Hair.
- Act 3: The Port Chicago 50: An Oral History – Dan Collison interviews Albert Williams, Freddy Meeks, Joseph Small, Percy Robinson, and Robert Routh, survivors of the Port Chicago disaster; unsafe conditions working with ammunition.
- Josh White, Uncle Sam Says
- Act 4: Orientation – Matt Malloy reads Daniel Orozco's short story
- The Company Way (from How to Succeed in Business Without Really Trying by Frank Loesser)

- Episode 38 – "Simulated Worlds"

Air Date: 1996-10-11
Description: Simulated worlds, Civil war reenactments, wax museums, simulated coal mines, fake ethnic restaurants, an ersatz Medieval castle and other re-created worlds that thrive all across America.
- Act I: Travels in Hyper-Reality; a Quick National Tour.
- Act II: Simulated Dinosaur Worlds.
- Act III: Ira Glass and Michael Camille, a scholar from the University of Chicago, attend Medieval Times.

- Episode 39 – "Halloween"

Air Date: 1996-10-25
Description: This week: A show for Halloween. Stories of things that are supposed to be scary, but aren't.
- Act 1: Dark Shadows
- Act II: A Scientist in a Haunted House.
- Act III: Vampire Girl.
- Act IV: Discovering Evil.
- Act V: Gang Girl.
- Act VI: (Your) Screams.

- Episode 40 – "Lessons"

Air Date: 1996-11-01
Description: Stories from acclaimed storyteller Spalding Gray and others.
- Act I: Ski Lessons.
- Act II: Swimming Lessons; Harvard instructor.
- Act III: Shooting Lessons; spud gun.
- Act IV: Lessons for men on how to have an affair.

- Episode 41 – "Politics"

Air Date: 1996-11-08
Description: More stories of the election you can't hear anywhere else.

- Episode 42 – "Get Over It!"

Air Date: 1996-11-15
Description: Three stories of people trying to forget the past and move on.

- Episode 43 – "Faustian Bargains"

Air Date: 1996-11-22
Description: Inspired by a spate of new Chicago stage adaptations of the Faust story, This American Life brings you stories of people who made a deal with the devil.
- Act I: Dangerous Minds; author and teacher LuAnne Johnson
- Act II: Satan's telemarketer; voice artist pastor
- Act III: Voyager; Peabody violinist Mendelssohn
- Act IV: Carmen becomes Faust
- Act V: First Contact; the story of the kid and the devil

- Episode 44 – "Poultry Slam '96"

Air Date: 1996-11-29
Description: In the midst of the five biggest poultry-consumption weeks of the year — the five weeks between Thanksgiving and Christmas, when Americans consume one-fourth of all the turkey they eat in a year — This American Life presents stories about turkeys, chickens, ducks and fowl of all kinds.
- Ducky
- Chicken Man
- Growing in a Turkey Farm
- David Sedaris an excerpt from his diaries: A turkey head.
- Chicken Rustler, South African Chicken Blood.
- Chicken Man Like The Phoenix - New Episode since 1969

- Episode 45 – "Media Fringe"

Air Date: 1996-12-06
Description: Four stories about people struggling at the fringes of our nation's media/music/infotainment industry.
- Act I: How to Get Famous; Sandra Tsing Loh
- Act II: Whoring in Commercial Radio News; Scott Carrier and The Friendly Man;
- Act III: Doing a personal act for money; Sarah Vowell; analog love
- Act IV: Lifestyles of the rich and famous; Cheryl Trykv

- Episode 46 – "Sissies"

Air Date: 1996-12-13
Description: Though being gay no longer has much of a stigma in some parts of the country, being a sissy still does—even among gay men. In this show we have a number of surprising and unusual stories of sissies, their families, and why people still get so upset about them.
- Act I: Anti-Oedipus
- Act II: Instruction For Sissies; John Conners reads from: "How to Improve Your Personality"
- Act III: Pancy Kings Sing Songs Of love; Dave Awl
- Act IV: Dan Savage; Who Loves a Sissy? The Other Love That Dares Not Speak Its Name

- Episode 47 – "Christmas and Commerce"

Air Date: 1996-12-20
Description: Stories about the intersection of Christmas and retail, including David Sedaris's story "Santaland Diaries", which was first broadcast on NPR's Morning Edition several years ago in a much shorter version. The diaries are about David's two Christmas seasons working as an elf in Macy's department store on New York's Herald Square. When it was first broadcast, it generated more requests for tapes than any story in Morning Edition's history except the death of Red Barber. Also, David Rakoff on playing Freud in the windows of Barney's department store. And other stories.
- Act I: Toys R Us
- Act II: Davis Sedaris; Full Time Elf
- Act III: Christmas Freud

== Reruns broadcast in 1996 ==
- 1996-02-14 – Episode 4: Vacations
- 1996-03-07 – Episode 7: Quitting
- 1996-04-05 – Episode 9: Julia Sweeney
- 1996-05-17 – Episode 10: Double Lives
- 1996-06-28 – Episode 21: Factions
- 1996-07-05 – Episode 9: Julia Sweeney
- 1996-08-02 – Episode 20: From a Distance
- 1996-09-13 – Episode 22: Adult Children
- 1996-10-04 – Episode 4: Vacations
- 1996-10-18 – Episode 15: Dawn
- 1996-12-27 – Episode 20: From a Distance
