= Wayne's World (film) =

1992 film by Penelope Spheeris

- Theatrical release poster
- Directed by: Penelope Spheeris
- Written by: Mike Myers; Bonnie Turner; Terry Turner
- Based on: "Wayne's World" by Mike Myers
- Produced by: Lorne Michaels
- Starring: Mike Myers; Dana Carvey; Rob Lowe
- Cinematography: Theo van de Sande
- Edited by: Malcolm Campbell
- Music by: J. Peter Robinson
- Distributed by: Paramount Pictures
- Release date: February 14, 1992
- Running time: 95 minutes
- Country: United States
- Language: English
- Budget: $20 million
- Box office: $183.1 million

Wayne's World is a 1992 American comedy film directed by Penelope Spheeris, produced by Lorne Michaels, and written by Mike Myers and Bonnie and Terry Turner. Based on the SNL sketch by Myers, it stars Myers in his feature film debut as Wayne Campbell and Dana Carvey as Garth Algar, a pair of rock and heavy metal fans who broadcast a public-access television show. It also features Tia Carrere, Rob Lowe, Lara Flynn Boyle and Brian Doyle-Murray in supporting roles, with cameos by Chris Farley, Ed O'Neill, Ione Skye, Meat Loaf, Robert Patrick and Alice Cooper.

Wayne's World was released in the United States on February 14, 1992, by Paramount Pictures. A critical and commercial success, it was the tenth-highest-grossing film of 1992 and remains the highest-grossing film based on a Saturday Night Live sketch. A sequel, Wayne's World 2, was released the following year.

== Plot ==
In Aurora, Illinois, rock music fans Wayne Campbell and Garth Algar host a public-access television show, Wayne's World, from Wayne's parents' basement. A broadcast of Wayne's World catches the attention of television producer Benjamin Kane. While cruising with friends in Garth's car, the Mirthmobile, Wayne stops to admire a 1964 Fender Stratocaster in a shop window. They later go to a nightclub, where they avoid Wayne's troubled ex-girlfriend Stacy while Wayne falls for Cassandra Wong, vocalist and bassist of the band Crucial Taunt. Wayne learns Cantonese to impress Cassandra at a later encounter.

Benjamin meets with Wayne and Garth to purchase the rights to the show for $5,000 each, which Wayne uses to buy the Stratocaster. Benjamin attempts to court Cassandra using his wealth and good looks, distracting Wayne and Garth with all-access tickets to an Alice Cooper concert in Milwaukee while offering to produce a music video for Crucial Taunt. At the show, Wayne and Garth make the acquaintance of a bodyguard to music producer Frankie Sharp, head of Sharp Records.

While filming the revamped Wayne's World under Benjamin's oversight, Wayne and Garth find adjusting to the professional studio environment challenging. Their contract obliges them to give a promotional interview to their sponsor, Noah Vanderhoff, who owns a franchise of amusement arcades. After Wayne ridicules Vanderhoff on the show, Benjamin furiously fires him, leaving Garth to host the show himself. This infuriates Garth and jeopardizes their friendship. Jealous of the attention Benjamin is giving Cassandra, Wayne attempts to prevent her from participating in the Crucial Taunt music video shoot, and she breaks up with him for his distrust.

Wayne and Garth reconcile and hatch a scheme to win Cassandra back by getting her a record deal. They plan to ensure that Frankie Sharp hears Crucial Taunt play. While Garth and their friends infiltrate a satellite station with the aid of Benjamin's assistant, Wayne goes to Cassandra's video shoot. Still, he embarrasses himself to expose Benjamin's ulterior motive. Cassandra initially tells him to go home, but realizing Benjamin is up to no good, she changes her mind and leaves for Aurora with Wayne while he apologizes.

The Wayne's World crew hacks into Sharp's satellite television and broadcasts the Crucial Taunt performance from Wayne's basement, where Sharp and Benjamin converge. Unfortunately, Sharp declines to offer Crucial Taunt a record contract. As a result, Cassandra breaks up with Wayne permanently. She and Benjamin depart to a tropical resort. Stacy reveals that she is pregnant with Wayne's child; and finally, an electrical fire destroys Wayne's house and kills Garth.

Dissatisfied with this ending, Wayne and Garth turn to the film's audience and halt proceedings; they restart the scene in which Benjamin is unmasked as "Old Man Withers" in a Scooby-Doo parody ending. Still unsatisfied with this ending, they restart again with a "mega happy ending", in which Cassandra successfully signs a record contract and begins a relationship with Wayne. Garth begins a relationship with a waitress, while a reformed Benjamin learns that money and good looks do not necessarily bring happiness.

== Cast ==
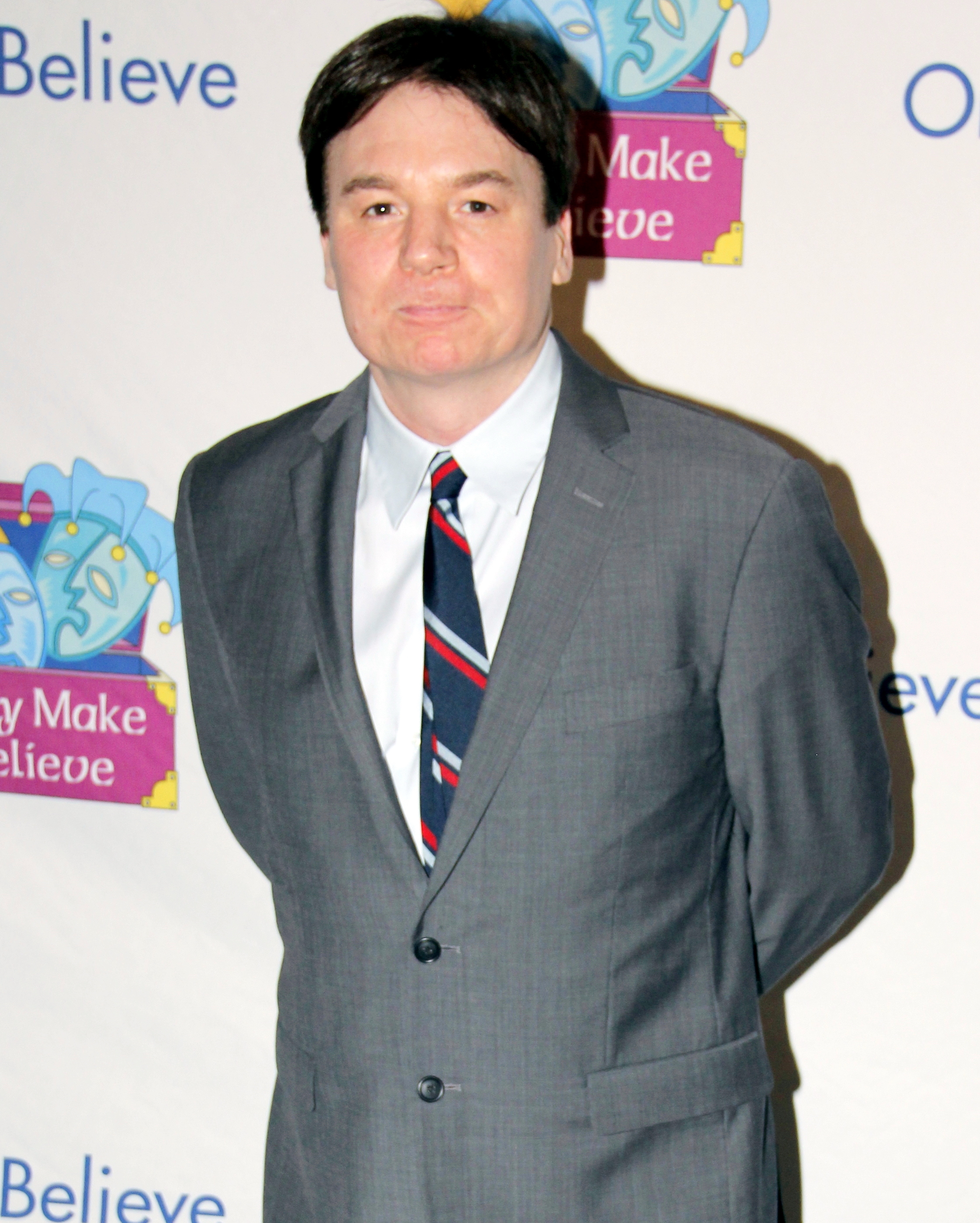
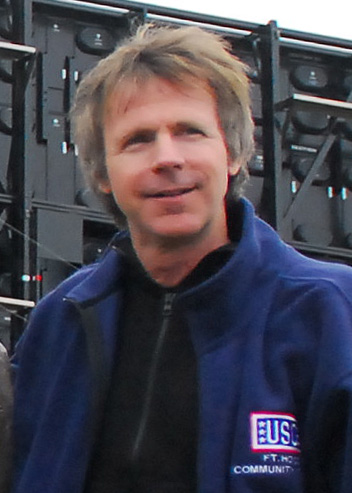
Mike Myers (in 2011) and Dana Carvey (in 2009)
- Mike Myers as Wayne Campbell, host of Wayne's World. Wayne lives with his parents in Aurora, Illinois, and spends his free time "partying" with his friends in and around the popular rock/metal scene of the early 1990s. His best friend is Garth Algar, with whom he hosts their late-night cable-access show broadcasting from the basement of Wayne's parents' house.
- Dana Carvey as Garth Algar, Wayne's best friend and co-host. Garth is socially awkward and more stereotypically "nerdy" and introverted than his more outgoing friends. He has a crush on the girl who works at the donut shop that their group frequents, Stan Mikita's Donuts, but is unable to work up the nerve to talk to her.
- Tia Carrere as Cassandra Wong, lead vocalist and bassist of the local rock band Crucial Taunt and Wayne's love interest. She and her band perform gigs around town, notably at a heavy metal bar frequented by Wayne and his friends called The Gasworks. Cassandra is a Cantonese immigrant who claims to have learned English at college and from the Police Academy films.
- Rob Lowe as Benjamin Kane, a sleazy Chicago-based television producer. His official title is Regional Programming Director for Oliver Communications. Benjamin is good-looking, well-educated, and highly successful, but cynical, manipulative, and ruthless in his approach to business.
- Lara Flynn Boyle as Stacy, Wayne's psycho ex-girlfriend. Lacking self-esteem, she does not understand or accept that Wayne has broken up with her and still treats him like they are a couple.
- Brian Doyle-Murray as Noah Vanderhoff, a video arcade magnate, and a prospective client of Benjamin's who is seeking to place him as the primary corporate sponsor of a television show aimed at teens and younger adults.
- Colleen Camp as Mimi Vanderhoff, Noah's wife.
- Kurt Fuller as Russell Finley, producer/director of many of the television shows executive produced by Benjamin. Russell has a reputation as a hit-maker, having won awards and acclaim for many of the programs he has produced. He is fiercely loyal to Benjamin, believing Benjamin to be his friend.
- Chris Farley has a cameo as the well-informed security guard at an Alice Cooper concert taking place in Milwaukee.
- Meat Loaf as Tiny, a doorman/bouncer at the Gasworks with whom Wayne and Garth are "in." He allows them to skip the line at the door, and informs them about the bands playing and if they are good or not.
- Frank DiLeo as rock promoter Frankie 'Mr. Big' Sharp. The CEO of Sharp Records, Frank takes a very hands-on approach to his business, driving back and forth across the country to find new acts to sign to his label. He is afraid of flying, and thus takes his stretch limousine everywhere.
- Ed O'Neill as Glen, the darkly disturbed manager at Stan Mikita's Donuts. According to Wayne, he works at the donut shop "24 hours a day". He makes frequent references to death, dying, and killing, and implies that he once murdered someone in the heat of passion. O'Neill had previously appeared in a "Wayne's World" sketch during a 1990 Saturday Night Live hosting appearance.
- Michael DeLuise as Alan, one of Wayne and Garth's crew.
- Lee Tergesen as Terry, Wayne and Garth's head cameraman who has a penchant for openly expressing platonic love for his friends through hugging and repeatedly telling them, "I love you, man."
- Dan Bell as Neil, Wayne and Garth's second cameraman.
- Sean Gregory Sullivan as Phil, Wayne and Garth's friend who works at an auto repair shop. Wayne describes him as being frequently "partied out."
- Mike Hagerty as Davey, a controller at the Cable 10 television station who Benjamin and Russell ask for help.
- Frederick Coffin as Officer Koharski, an enthusiastic local beat cop who is kind to Wayne, Garth, and their group.
- Donna Dixon as Garth's dream woman, who works at Stan Mikita's Donuts.
- Ione Skye as Elyse, a seemingly casual girlfriend of Benjamin's who introduces him to Wayne's World.
- Robin Ruzan as a waitress at Stan Mikita's.
- Charles Noland as Ron Paxton, who tries to market his invention, the "Suck Kut," on Wayne and Garth's show.
- Carmen Filpi as Old Man Withers. He runs a "haunted" amusement park.
- Robert Patrick has a cameo as the T-1000 (reprising his role from Terminator 2: Judgment Day), with his role being listed in the credits as "Bad Cop". He is a police officer who pulls Wayne over while he is speeding on his way to Cassandra. He then questions him about a boy (presumably John Connor), leading to Wayne speeding off screaming.
- Alice Cooper with Pete Friesen, Derek Sherinian, Stef Burns, and Jimmy DeGrasso as themselves, performing "Feed My Frankenstein". Wayne and Garth go to see him backstage at his show, where they receive a lecture on the history of Milwaukee.

== Production ==
Wayne's World was green-lit by Paramount Pictures in 1991. It was the second film based on a Saturday Night Live sketch, following The Blues Brothers in 1980. Producer Lorne Michaels hired Penelope Spheeris to direct, after she had directed several music documentaries. Spheeris said, "I had been just struggling as a female director in this business for many years. I was 45 years old when I got that job. I just kept hanging in there. And Wayne's World happened, and it sort of flipped my life around."

Spheeris clashed with Myers during filming. She told Entertainment Weekly that Myers was "emotionally needy and got more difficult as the shoot went along", and that he complained during the "Bohemian Rhapsody" scene, refusing to believe audiences would find it funny. She said she attempted to assuage Myers by having her daughter provide him snacks, and that on one occasion he stormed off the set, upset that there was no margarine for his bagel. Myers and Spheeris argued over the final cut, causing Myers to prevent Spheeris from directing Wayne's World 2. In 2022, Spheeris said the conflict had been overstated, and that the margarine incident was the only time when she felt Myers was being unreasonable.

== Soundtrack ==
The soundtrack album reached number one on the Billboard 200. The album was certified double-Platinum by the RIAA on July 16, 1997.

The studio and Lorne Michaels originally wanted to use a Guns N' Roses song for the headbanging scene, but Myers demanded "Bohemian Rhapsody", even threatening to quit the production unless it was used. Freddie Mercury, the lead singer of Queen, died of bronchial pneumonia resulting from AIDS a few months before the film's release. According to Brian May, Mercury saw the headbanging scene before his death, found it hilarious and approved the song for the film's use. However, Spheeris disputed May's recollection in a 2022 interview, saying that "My guess is it's not true." She explained that due to the short timeframe between the completion of the film and Mercury's death, she believes it is highly unlikely that anyone would have had access to a tape of the scene to show Mercury.

In the "No Stairway To Heaven" scene, the first four notes played of "Stairway to Heaven" were replaced with a different set of guitar notes in all home media releases of the film, since home video publishers considered the $100,000 cost of licensing the song to be too high. The original notes were restored with the 4K Blu-ray release in 2022.

Gary Wright re-recorded "Dream Weaver" for the film, which is heard whenever Wayne looks at Cassandra.

Tia Carrere sang her own vocals on the songs she performed in the film, as well as cover songs such as Sweet's "The Ballroom Blitz", which were included on the film's soundtrack album.

Myers originally wanted Alice Cooper's "I'm Eighteen" and "School's Out" in the film, but Cooper's manager Shep Gordon convinced him to use "Feed My Frankenstein" instead. It was Myers' first meeting with Gordon and it made such a strong, positive impression on him that they formed a friendship. Myers directed a 2014 documentary about Gordon, titled Supermensch: The Legend of Shep Gordon.

== Release ==
The film was a box office success, debuting at number one. The film's final domestic gross was $121,697,323, making it the ninth-highest-grossing film of 1992 and the highest-grossing of the 11 films based on Saturday Night Live skits.

=== Home media ===
Wayne's World was released on VHS on August 12, 1992, by Paramount Home Video. It proved successful in the home video market, and was the fifteenth-best-selling video of 1992 in the United States.

== Reception ==
On Rotten Tomatoes, the film has an approval rating of 79% based on 96 reviews, with an average rating of 6.60/10, with the critical consensus stating, "An oddball comedy that revels in its silliness and memorable catch phrases, Wayne's World is also fondly regarded because of its endearing characters." On Metacritic, the film has a weighted average score of 57 out of 100 based on reviews from 14 critics, indicating "mixed or average reviews". Audiences polled by CinemaScore gave the film an average grade of "A−" on an A+ to F scale.

Roger Ebert gave the film three stars out of four and said in his review: "I walked into Wayne's World expecting a lot of dumb, vulgar comedy, and I got plenty, but I also found what I didn't expect: a genuinely amusing, sometimes even intelligent, undercurrent." Gene Siskel called the film a "very funny and most original comedy" with "inspired bits of whimsy," and ranked it number eight on his list of the ten best movies of 1992. Desson Howe wrote in The Washington Post that making a movie out of such a "teeny sketch" is "better than you'd expect", but criticized the finale as "an attempt to lampoon movie endings" "and a despair-driven inability to end the movie". Filipino columnist Jullie Y. Daza of the Manila Standard stated that "I didn't know what the generation gap meant until I saw this silly, nonsensical movie called 'Wayne's World' and I saw how my son went stark raving mad over it."

== In popular culture ==
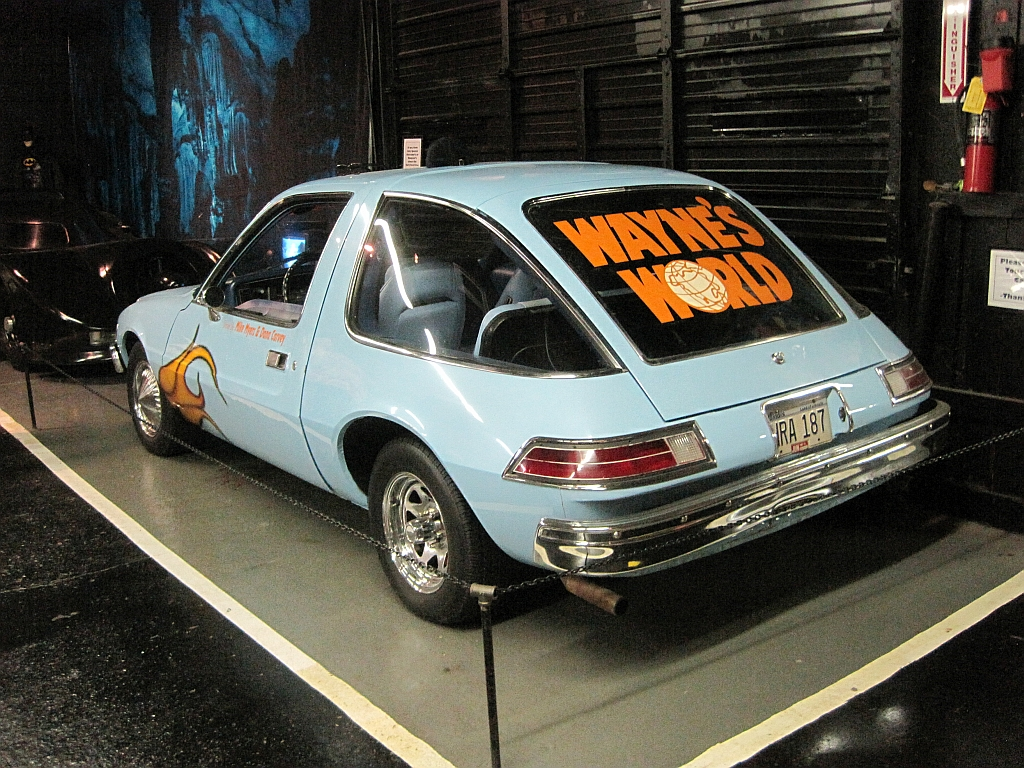
Wayne's World AMC Pacer at Rusty's TV & Movie Car Museum in Jackson, Tennessee

Filled with pop culture references, the sketches and the film started catchphrases such as "Schwing!" and "Schyea", as well as popularizing "That's what she said", "Party on!", and the use of "... Not!" after an apparently affirmative sentence to state the contrary, and "We're not worthy! We're not worthy!"

The scene in which Wayne, Garth, and friends lip-sync to Queen's "Bohemian Rhapsody" in an AMC Pacer is one of the most well-known scenes in the film. Due to its prominent appearance in Wayne's World, "Bohemian Rhapsody" reached #2 in the United States and reignited the band's popularity in the country.

The Pacer was produced by American Motors Corporation (AMC) from 1975 to 1980. The car was purposely a second-hand Pacer painted baby blue with flames on the sides and non-matching wheels, which Wayne and Garth dubbed "The Mirthmobile". The original car from the film was sold and appeared in a 2015 episode of Pawn Stars. The car was restored to running condition with the original movie props inside the car, but with a functional stereo system added. The Pacer was sold in 2016 for $37,400. Because of "The Mirthmobile" role, the Pacer is arguably one of the two most famous AMC cars featured in film or TV, the other being "Dixie", the Jeep CJ-7 driven by Daisy Duke in The Dukes of Hazzard.

Between The Lions, a puppet-based children's television series from 2000 to 2010, produced a short repeating segment called "Gawain's Word," featuring two jousting knights charging at each other, each touting a speech balloon with half of a word which then became their respective names, then demonstrating the word. Though the title of the segment clearly is a parody of the SNL skit, the two knights in the segment speak more characteristically like Bill and Ted from Bill & Ted's Excellent Adventure than Wayne and Garth from Wayne's World.

The cast, crew, and other related musical guests were part of Josh Gad's Reunited Apart web series' second season, first available in December 2020.

== Accolades ==
American Film Institute recognition:

- AFI's 100 Years...100 Laughs – Nominated
- AFI's 100 Years...100 Movie Quotes:
  - "Schwing!" – Nominated
  - "We're not worthy. We're not worthy." – Nominated
- AFI's 100 Years...100 Songs:
  - "Bohemian Rhapsody" – Nominated

== See also ==
- Recurring Saturday Night Live characters and sketches
- List of Saturday Night Live feature films
- Spindle, a sculpture which appears in the film
