= Stephen Hibbert =

American actor and screenwriter (1957–2026)

- Born: June 14, 1957; Fleetwood, Lancashire, England
- Died: March 2, 2026 (aged 68); Denver, Colorado, U.S.
- Occupations: Actor; television writer
- Years active: 1984–2026
- Notable work: Pulp Fiction (1994)
- Spouses: Julia Sweeney (m. 1989; div. 1994) Alicia Agos (m. 1996–2009)

Stephen Anthony Hibbert (September 19, 1957 – March 2, 2026) was a British-American actor and television writer. He portrayed the masked character known as the Gimp in the film Pulp Fiction (1994), and wrote for several notable television programmes including Late Night with David Letterman, MADtv, and Boy Meets World. He also co-wrote the comedy film It's Pat: The Movie (1994).

Hibbert built a diverse career that spanned television writing, sketch comedy, animation, and character acting in film and television.

== Early life ==
Stephen Anthony Hibbert was born in Fleetwood, Lancashire, England. His parents, Derek and Pat Hibbert, emigrated to the United States when he was a young child, and he was raised in Orange County, California. The oldest of four children, Hibbert grew up immersed in both British and American cultural influences, which later informed his comedic voice and writing style.

== Career ==
Hibbert began his career in the entertainment industry as a comedy writer in the 1980s. One of his earliest major positions was as a writer on Late Night with David Letterman from 1984 to 1986, contributing to the program's distinctive style of offbeat humor.

Throughout the late 1980s and 1990s, he wrote for a variety of television programs and animated series, including Animaniacs, Darkwing Duck, MADtv, and Boy Meets World.

In 1994, Hibbert co-wrote the comedy film It's Pat: The Movie, based on the popular Saturday Night Live character portrayed by his then-wife Julia Sweeney.

Although primarily known as a writer, Hibbert also appeared in a number of film and television roles. His most high-profile performance came in Quentin Tarantino’s critically acclaimed crime film Pulp Fiction (1994), where he portrayed the silent and unsettling character known as the Gimp.

Hibbert also appeared in several comedic films, including Austin Powers: The Spy Who Shagged Me (1999), where he played a prison guard, and The Cat in the Hat (2003). Additional television appearances included guest roles on series such as Just Shoot Me!, Jericho, and Dr. Ken.

== Personal life ==
Hibbert was previously married to actress and comedian Julia Sweeney. Later, he married Alicia Agos, with whom he had three children, Ronnie, Rosalind and Greg.

He died on March 2, 2026, in Denver, Colorado, at the age of 68 following a heart attack.

== Filmography ==
=== Film ===
- Pulp Fiction (1994) – The Gimp
- Austin Powers: The Spy Who Shagged Me (1999) – Prison guard
- The Cat in the Hat (2003) – Jim McFlinnigan

=== Television ===
- Newhart (1987) – Student #3
- Just Shoot Me!
- Jericho
- True Jackson, VP
- Dr. Ken

=== Writer ===
- Late Night with David Letterman (1984–1986)
- Darkwing Duck
- Animaniacs
- MADtv
- Boy Meets World
