= Julia Sweeney =

American actress (born 1959)

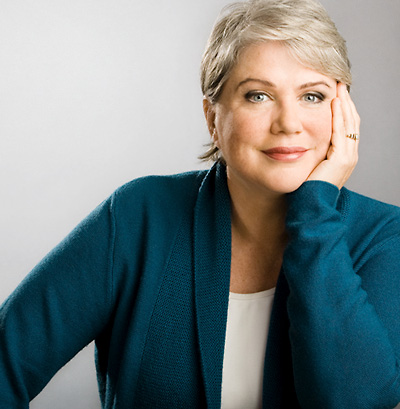
- Sweeney in 2008
- Born: October 1958 (age 68); Spokane, Washington, U.S.
- Education: University of Washington (BA)
- Occupations: Actress; comedian; author
- Years active: 1988–present
- Spouses: Stephen Hibbert (m. 1989; div. 1994) Michael Blum (m. 2008)
- Children: 1

Julia Sweeney (born October 1958) is an American actress and comedian. She gained fame as a cast member on the NBC sketch comedy series Saturday Night Live from 1990 to 1994. She played Mrs. Keeper in the film Stuart Little and voiced Brittany in Father of the Pride. She appeared in the Hulu series Shrill, the Showtime series Work in Progress, and the Starz series American Gods. Sweeney also had a recurring role on Frasier.

== Early life ==
Sweeney was born and raised in Spokane, Washington, the daughter of Robert Mark Sweeney and Jeraldine "Jeri" Sweeney (née Ivers). Her father was an attorney and federal prosecutor, while her mother was a homemaker. She has an Irish Catholic background.

As a child, she was drawn to imitating voices and inventing characters. She attended Marycliff High School and Gonzaga Preparatory School, where she appeared in a number of plays. She graduated with a double major in economics and European history from the University of Washington, where she was student body vice president and became a member of Delta Gamma sorority. After graduation, Sweeney moved to Los Angeles, where she worked as an accountant for Columbia Pictures and United Artists.

== Career ==
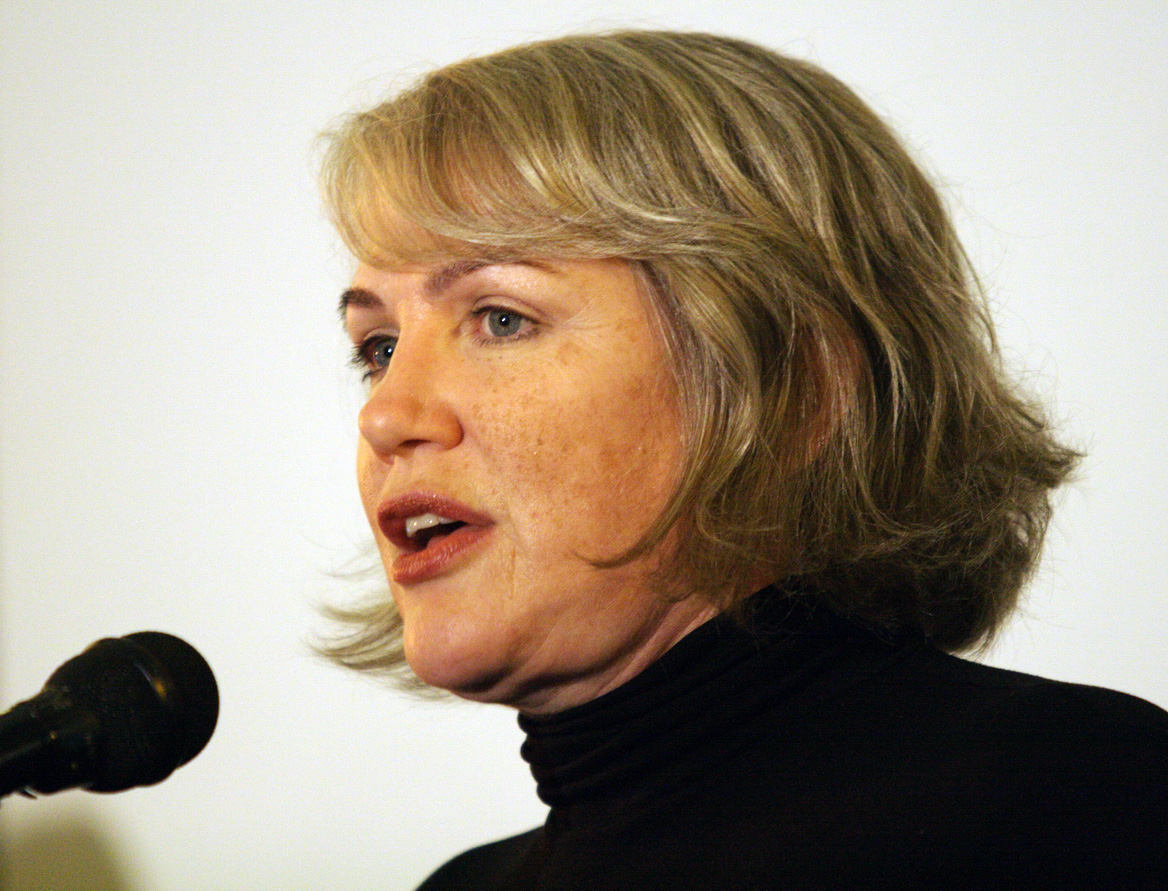
Sweeney speaking at the Atheist Alliance International Convention in 2008

In 1988, while still working as an accountant, Sweeney enrolled in classes with the improvisational comedy troupe the Groundlings, eventually being selected to be part of the troupe's Sunday Company. It was at the Groundlings that she began to develop characters, which she would later bring to the stage, film, and television. They include Mea Culpa, the title character of Mea's Big Apology (co-written by then-husband Stephen Hibbert), which won the Best Written Play Award from L.A. Weekly in 1988, and has been developed by Sweeney (in collaboration with Jim Emerson) into a screenplay; and the androgynous Pat.

=== Saturday Night Live ===
At a Groundlings performance in 1989, she was offered a spot as one of Saturday Night Live's featured players. She joined the regular Saturday Night Live cast the following year and remained with the show through four seasons, from 1990 to 1994. Her most popular character was Pat, whose impossible-to-determine gender was the basis for Sweeney's It's Pat! sketches on Saturday Night Live, and a later feature film of the same name, which was a critical and commercial failure, costing $8 million to make but grossing only $60,822 at the box office.

=== Monologues ===
==== God Said Ha! ====
After leaving the cast of Saturday Night Live, Sweeney returned to Los Angeles where, shortly afterwards, her career was put on hold by a series of personal traumas. Her brother Michael was diagnosed with lymphoma, and shortly thereafter Sweeney discovered that she too had cancer. Her brother did not survive the cancer. Throughout the ordeal, Sweeney told stories of her experiences in serio-comic performances at L.A.'s alternative comedy club, the Un-Cabaret, eventually developing the stories into a one-woman stage show called God Said Ha!, which debuted at San Francisco's Magic Theater in 1995.

God Said Ha! moved to Broadway, winning the 1996 New York Comedy Festival's Audience Award, and a CD recording of the show earned her a Grammy nomination for Best Comedy Album that same year. Miramax released a film version of the show in 1998, directed by Sweeney and produced by Quentin Tarantino. The film earned the Golden Space Needle Award at the Seattle International Film Festival, and was released on DVD in 2003. Portions of the monologues from Un-Cabaret were featured on episode 9 of This American Life (then known as Your Radio Playhouse) in January 1996. Since her initial monologue, she has appeared on three more This American Life episodes.

==== In the Family Way ====
Sweeney's second monologue chronicled the adoption of her daughter from China. In the Family Way started on stage in New York City in early 2003 at the Ars Nova Theatre. The show was directed by Broadway stage director Mark Brokaw, before migrating to the Groundlings Theatre in Los Angeles. Sweeney has also released a CD recording of In the Family Way and, in 2006, performed a 25-minute excerpt of the show at the Hollywood Bowl with a new orchestration written especially for her piece by composer Anthony Marinelli and performed by the Los Angeles Philharmonic.

==== Letting Go of God ====
Sweeney's third autobiographical monologue is titled Letting Go of God. In it, she discusses her Catholic upbringing, early religious ideology, and the life events and internal search that led her to believe that the universe can function on its own without a deity to preside over it; as well as her becoming an atheist. Sweeney begins by sharing the account of when her mother told her that her birthday was really October 10 instead of September 10, and how traumatic it was to discover she was not a winsome Virgo but really a Libra.

An audio recording of Letting Go of God was released on CD in 2006, and it was filmed live on stage in May 2007.

==== Julia Sweeney: Older and Wider ====
After taking some years out of the limelight to be a suburban Chicago housewife and mother, Sweeney returned with a fourth monologue in which she riffs on contemporary politics and religion, among other topics. The performance was so popular that it sold out its original six-day run at the Audrey Skirball Kenis Theater at the Geffen Playhouse in Los Angeles, as well as a one-week extension.

Sweeney appeared at the 2019 CSICon put on by the Center for Inquiry (CFI), where she presented about half of the monologue for the conference attendees.

=== Other work ===
In a segment for This American Life in 1999, Sweeney describes one of her first jobs as a bartender's assistant, and how she began embezzling funds from her employer, and the consequences thereof.

In 1992, Sweeney worked with the rock band Ugly Kid Joe, performing in the music video for their hit "Neighbor" and contributing introductory audio for two tracks, "Goddamn Devil" and "Everything About You". The latter was on the soundtrack to the Lorne Michaels movie Wayne's World.

In 1994, she had a small role as "Raquel" in the movie Pulp Fiction; other film roles include Gremlins 2: The New Batch, Coneheads, Vegas Vacation, Clockstoppers, Whatever It Takes, and Stuart Little.

In 2000, she provided the voice of Wanda MacPherson in The WB animated sitcom Baby Blues. She was also the voice of Margo on the ABC animated series The Goode Family, Dr. Glove on Back at the Barnyard, Miss Tronica on Lloyd in Space, and Sheri Squibbles in Pixar's 2013 animated film Monsters University.

A veteran of live television, Sweeney made her mark on primetime television as a series regular on George and Leo and Maybe It's Me, and guest starred on 3rd Rock from the Sun, Hope & Gloria, Mad About You, and According to Jim. In 2004, she appeared in two episodes of Frasier, as Frasier's blind date turned litigious unwanted houseguest, Ann Hodges. She had a guest role on Sex and the City, and served as a consultant for its last three seasons, as well as consulting on season two of Desperate Housewives. In 2019, she played a terrorist grandmother in season 6 of the American cop comedy series Brooklyn 99.

Sweeney met singer/songwriter Jill Sobule at a Technology Entertainment and Design (TED) conference, and performed together in 2008. They took the show, called Jill and Julia, on the road in 2009 and 2010, performing in New York, Denver and other locations. It was an autobiographical mix of music, stories, and commentary.

From 2009 to 2010, Sweeney was also part of the regular rotation of panelists for the NPR news quiz radio show Wait Wait... Don't Tell Me!, in downtown Chicago. In 2021, Sweeney was cast in the third season of American Gods on Starz.

Sweeney has long pushed for acceptance of people who are not religious, and in 2019 she was appointed to be on the board of directors of the Center for Inquiry. She was also awarded the Humanist Pioneer Award in 2006 by the American Humanist Association.

From 2019–2021, Sweeney was a recurring character on Hulu's series, Shrill. She played the mother of Aidy Bryant.

In 2025, Sweeney was featured in We Are Pat, a Ro Haber documentary about comedy, trans and non-binary identity and her SNL character.

== Personal life ==
Sweeney is married to scientist Michael Blum. They live in Los Angeles near their daughter, whom they adopted from China.

== Works and publications ==
- Sweeney, Julia, and Zander, Christine. It's Pat!: My Life Exposed. New York: Hyperion, 1992. ISBN 978-1-562-82938-4
- Sweeney, Julia. God Said, "Ha!". New York: Bantam Books, 1997. ISBN 978-0-553-10647-3
- Sweeney, Julia. If It's Not One Thing, It's Your Mother. New York : Simon & Schuster, 2013. ISBN 978-1-451-67404-0
