= Pat (Saturday Night Live) =

Fictional character on Saturday Night Live

- Saturday Night Live character
- First appearance: Saturday Night Live
- Last appearance: It's Pat
- Portrayed by: Julia Sweeney

In-universe information
- Gender: Unknown
- Occupation: Various
- Nationality: American

Pat O'Neal Riley is an androgynous fictional character created and performed by Julia Sweeney for the American sketch comedy show Saturday Night Live (SNL) from 1990 to 1994. The character was later featured in the film It's Pat. The central humorous aspect of sketches featuring Pat is the inability of others to determine the character's gender.

== Background ==
Sweeney has said, "I'd been an accountant for like five years, and there was one person I worked with in particular who had a lot of mannerisms like Pat. This person sort of drooled and had the kind of body language of Pat. I started trying to do him. I was testing it out on my friends and they were just like, 'Yeah, it's good, but it doesn't seem like a guy that much.' Then I discovered this girl (I think) that lived in my apartment complex, and also was chubby with very curly black hair and thick glasses, and seemed to always wear those western shirts with the snaps. I thought my original idea of the character being in drag couldn't quite pull off convincingly enough. So seeing the girl that was so similar inspired the ambiguous sexuality, and I thought, maybe that's the joke. I'll just have one joke in here about how we don't know if that's a man or a woman just to sort of cover up for my lack of ability to really play a guy convincingly."

== Physical appearance ==
Pat O'Neill Riley is fat, has short, curly black hair, and wears thick glasses. Pat typically wears a light-blue pearl-snap Western-style shirt with tan slacks.

In creating the character, actress Sweeney colored her lips beige, and colored in her eyebrows, to create the character's sex-ambiguous appearance.

The final look was inspired more by the girl in her apartment complex than the man she worked with, though many of the mannerisms were more inspired by the man she worked with. The identity of the man she worked has not been revealed, but the girl who inspired the look is said to be named Laura Joseph, a computer programmer for Hughes who lived in the same apartment complex.

== Sketches ==
The sketches always revolve around the gag of Pat's unrevealed gender: the name "Pat" can be short for "Patricia", a female name, or "Patrick", a male name. The celebrity guests on the show play everyday people who encounter Pat, and who then try to discern Pat's gender, without being so rude as to actually ask outright. Pat remains oblivious, and endlessly frustrates the questioners with answers that leave Pat's gender vague.

Pat often makes statements that seem to reveal a gender, only to then immediately confuse things again. A typical example might be, "Sorry if I'm a little grumpy, I have really bad cramps... I rode my bike over here, and my calf muscles are killing me!". Some jokes would be a bit more buried, such as Pat remarking "In high school I did well in drama, especially when I played the role of Peter Pan!" (Many theatrical productions of Peter Pan feature a woman in the title role.) In another sketch, Pat tells Kevin Nealon that the name is Pat Riley (like the coach of the Lakers), only to add, "but there's one big difference between me and him... I never coached a professional basketball team. That's my little joke!"

Other gags include Pat's attempts at humor, which serve to confuse everyone further: when asked what "Pat" is short for, the character replies, "Pat is short for P-a-a-a-a-a-t!"

=== Pat's first appearance: Pat at the Office (December 1990) ===
"Pat" debuted on December 1, 1990 (Season 16, Episode 7), with John Goodman hosting. In the sketch, Bill (Kevin Nealon) is thanking a friend over the phone for his new job, then asks whether Bill's supervisor is a man or a woman. Before he gets an answer, he has to hang up when Pat enters. Bill asks, "Do you have a boyf... girl... Are you married?" Pat explains that Pat's planned marriage to Chris fell through, because Chris got involved with Terry. (This answers nothing since Chris is an androgynous name and, and Pat could be saying "Terry" or "Teri".) Next Bill says he's trying to decide what to watch tonight: either a Giants-49ers game, or Murphy Brown. Pat states an inability to help on that matter, having rented a film: Tootsie. Bill's last effort, when they agree to go to lunch together, is to learn whether Pat has a wallet or a purse; Pat wears a fanny pack.

=== It's Pat: Pat's Significant Other (February 1991) ===
Aired February 16, 1991 (Season 16, Episode 13). Again at the office, Roseanne Barr played Sue, who meets co-worker Pat. Dana Carvey, dressed androgynously, plays Pat's love interest Chris, and Nealon reprised his role as Bill.

=== It's Pat: Pat at the Drugstore (April 1991) ===
Aired April 13, 1991 (Season 16, Episode 17). Catherine O'Hara played a drugstore clerk, who tries to help when Pat asks for disposable razors. O'Hara asks whether they would prefer a pink or blue package, but Pat says they will take whichever is cheaper. Next, they need a lotion for after shaving. The clerk offers a "bracing tonic" (for a man) or a "soothing lotion" (for a woman). Pat asks for Vaseline Intensive Care. The clerk says, "Yes, everybody likes that." Next, Pat asks the increasingly nervous shop-woman for some antiperspirant. O'Hara, overwrought, asks, "Roll-on or spray?" Pat asks what is on sale. "Secret", O'Hara says with faux joviality. "Strong enough for a woman, but made for a man" (transposing the slogan, "Strong Enough for a Man, Made for a Woman"). Pat makes one last purchase, for condoms; yet before O'Hara can draw the conclusion that Pat must be male, they proclaim, "I think contraception is the responsibility of both partners. What can I say? I'm a very sexual being!" The sketch ends when the clerk swoons out of sight behind her counter.

Sweeney wrote on her website, "I lerve Catherine O'Hara!!!! I think I was as giddy to meet her as is possible for me. She was great fun on the show and in this sketch."

=== It's Pat: Pat Goes to the Barber (May 1991) ===
Aired on May 18, 1991 (Season 16, Episode 20). When Pat goes to get a haircut, the hairdresser (George Wendt), has no idea whether to administer a male or female style. The stylist asks which magazine Pat would like to read, naming gender-specific titles (Sports Illustrated and Glamour). In response, they ask for People. When they say the haircut is to look good for a party, the barber asks what they'll be wearing, and they respond "Black". The barber attempts to find out Pat's sex by pointing to different prices for men and women displayed on the wall, but Pat simply gives him $20 and tells him to keep the change.

Julia Sweeney wrote, "Christine Zander and I wrote this sketch about Pat – personally I think this is the very best one of all the Pat sketches. Pat goes into a barbershop to get a haircut and the barber is confused – is it going to be a man's cut or a woman's?"

=== It's Pat: Birthday Party (October 1991) ===
Aired on October 12, 1991 (Season 17, Episode 3). Co-workers Siobhan Fallon Hogan, Phil Hartman, and Kevin Nealon give Pat a surprise birthday party. As they chat, Nealon asks whether Pat has a biological clock; Siobhan says, "I think you'd make a really great moth... fath... role model," but Pat tells them about a dysfunctional family and unhappy childhood. Hartman makes the next attempt: "Pat, would you say that you are more like your mother or your father?", but they reply, "I'm a perfect combination of both!" One of their estranged parents (Kirstie Alley), also androgynous and named Francis or Frances, comes into the party; when Nealon asks about Pat's birth, again there are only ambiguous answers, as well as the parent saying "I had to be both mother and father to you ever since (Jean or Gene) ran off with...that thing". The co-workers start to sing For He's a Jolly Good Fellow, but have to change "he's" to "Pat's". Chris Rock had a minor role as a messenger.

=== It's Pat: Pat Goes to the Gym (or Physical Evaluation) (November 1991) ===
Aired November 16, 1991 (Season 17, Episode 6). Linda Hamilton was the host in this episode, in which Pat decides to join a gym. Gym employee Andrea (Hamilton) cannot figure out their sex, so, filling in the application form, she asks for "age? ... height? ... sex?" and looks up hopefully. Pat says, "'Yes, please!' [stuttery laugh] That's my little joke." When they are asked for a middle name, the eager audience then finds out that the middle name is "O'Neill", again continuing the joke. (Pat never uses the middle name, as it is "embarrassing".) Andrea keeps trying: "Would you say that you're in good health? Do you have regular periods..." When Pat stares at her, Andrea hurriedly finishes, "... of activity?" Andrea tries again: "What kind of body are you going for? I mean, do you want a muscular V-shape?" (That would suggest Pat is male.) "Or something a little more curvy?" They reply, "Well, I just saw the movie Return to the Blue Lagoon. I'd sure like a body like that!" Andrea does not know whether they are referring to Milla Jovovich or Brian Krause. Andrea and fellow gym employee Ron (Tim Meadows) ask Pat which of them they would be more attracted to; Pat objects to the question; they suggest that Pat should go to the locker room. Just as the audience is about to see whether they enter either the men's or the women's, Kevin Nealon as a TV news anchor on Weekend Update interrupts with a Special Report alert. Upon returning to the Pat sketch, Andrea and Ron are laughing, with Andrea saying, "I guess our question is finally answered!", but only the studio audience might have seen which door Pat entered; the television viewer is still in the dark.

=== It's Pat: Rob Morrow (January 1992) ===
Aired on January 11, 1992 (Season 17, Episode 10) with Sweeney playing alongside Kevin Nealon as Bill, host Rob Morrow as Frank, Victoria Jackson as Dina, Dana Carvey and Mike Myers as guests, and Phil Hartman as the Narrator.

=== It's Pat: Pat's Interrogation (April 1992) ===
Aired April 11, 1992 (Season 17, Episode 17). In honor of having Sharon Stone as the host, Pat is brought in for a Basic Instinct interrogation process. The interrogators are played by Chris Farley, Dana Carvey, and Phil Hartman. The questions are sexual in nature: "Did you and Chris play any kind of games in bed?" Pat replies, "Role reversal! We felt it kept the relationship alive!" When asked, "Which one of you put on the condom?", Pat says, "We put it on together." Hartman asks, "if you were a baby, what color would your Pampers be, pink or blue?" Pat sounds surprised: "Diapers were all white back then!" Interrogator #2 (Carvey, who usually played Chris) begins to rant: "You're lying, Pat, you're lying! You're not telling the truth, and by God I'm gonna find out! You're not telling the truth, Pat, I'm gonna figure you out! I'm gonna figure you out!"

=== It's Pat: Pat Looks for a Roommate (Oct. 1992) ===
Aired October 10, 1992 (Season 18, Episode 3). The SNL cast wrote a spoof of the 1992 film Single White Female, in which Melanie Hutsell as Hedra, using a wig to look androgynous, plays a new roommate who becomes obsessed with wanting to look like and be like Pat. Other characters are played by David Spade as a prospective tenant who flees, Joe Pesci as Graham Knox, and Dana Carvey as Pat's love interest Chris.

Graham tries to warn Pat about Hedra, but they cannot understand why anyone would obsess. "Well, maybe she's in love with you. Maybe she's gay. Or, or straight. Or bi." Hedra enters, wearing the same clothes, glasses, and short curly hair as Pat's. Graham says, "Just look at the two of you. You look like bro... sist... twins."

=== It's Pat: Christopher Walken (October 1992) ===
Aired October 24, 1992 (Season 18, Episode 4). Pat is hired by a new firm. Carl (Walken), an account executive, has returned to work from needing a leave for psychiatric problems. As the co-workers gather in the office, he expresses his extreme perplexity and discomfort around Pat to Phil Hartman. At last he is driven insane by the enigma of Pat and dives out the window.

=== It's Pat: Harvey Keitel (January 1993) ===
Aired January 16, 1993 (Season 18, Episode 11). Harvey Keitel plays a shipwrecked sailor on a desert island, who has grown lonesome is then greeted by another castaway, who turns out to be Pat. Pat gives Pat's typical ambiguity, telling of the situation where Pat was on a luxury cruise playing shuffleboard "The battle of the sexes, and we won!" when the ship was attacked by a violent storm and Pat was thrashed overboard and ended up on the sailor's island. Although Keitel was made up to have some ambiguity such as long hair, it was obvious he was male as he wrote in his journal "I miss the intimacy of a woman, or at least some good male companionship". Later, the sailor asks Pat what sex is Pat. When Pat is about to speak, Adam Sandler is in the audience, breaking the fourth wall. He tells Pat that NBC is going through hard times with the impending final episode of Cheers and the departure of David Letterman, and if Pat spoils the joke then Saturday Night Live will be ruined because NBC will be bereft of all comedy.

Quentin Tarantino told Playboy in 1994, "There was only one sketch that Julia Sweeney, the actress who plays Pat did on Saturday Night Live that gave a clue to what Pat is. It was the sketch that Pat did with Harvey Keitel. And the thing is, they kissed in it. At one point they were thinking of taking the kiss out of the sketch. But Harvey, being Harvey, demanded they keep it in, that there'd be no integrity without the kiss. So that was the first time we'd seen Pat in an intimate situation – a smooch. There is a certain way that you hold your head, the way you come in for a kiss. And sitting there, watching it, I thought that Pat didn't kiss like a guy. Pat kissed like a girl."

=== Pat's Crying Game (March 1993) ===
Aired March 20, 1993 (Season 18, Episode 16). In a spoof of the movie The Crying Game, Pat sings the title song.

=== May 1994 ===
Aired on May 14, 1994 (Season 19, Episode 20). Pat appears at the end of the episode, alongside other recurring characters, singing "So Long, Farewell".

== Reception of the SNL character ==
A writer for Splitsider wrote, "While she brought plenty of squeaky energy to her four-year stint at SNL, Julia Sweeney is known best for creating the most unnerving character in the show's history, the sex-unspecific nerd Pat. With fourteen SNL appearances, not to mention an Emmy Awards ceremony cameo and 1994 feature film, the grating, whiny, yet perennially enigmatic Pat continues to be hailed as one of the show's most annoying — and oddly groundbreaking — recurring characters. In fact, SNL's recurring character mold, as well as male/female cast member divide, would have gone largely untested without Pat's existence. And for a featured player whose first year was spent in an overcrowded cast with 13 men and a mere 3 women, perhaps Sweeney sensed that a joke on the sex issue was the best way to get around it. Whatever the case, Pat's smarmy, pleading face will, for better or worse, remain the thing on SNL for which Sweeney is most remembered... Pat was a creepy yet instant recurring character hit..."

Pat was selected as #17 of "The 30 Best Saturday Night Live Characters" by Paste magazine in 2012: "Pat is probably a woman, but that doesn't really matter. Call her Patrick, call him Patricia. Just don't mistake him for the coach of a professional basketball team—or ask her middle name or any sex identifying questions for that matter. It won't affect Pat, it'll just drive you crazy."

=== Criticism ===
More than two decades after the sketches aired, Joey Soloway said they felt the premise and character were painful to non-binary and transgender people. Responding to Soloway's comments in 2019, Sweeney acknowledged that today "you would not make fun of somebody for being that way" and that the character was a bygone of "a whole other world."

The 2019 Showtime television show Work in Progress has suggested that the character was troublesome to non-binary and transgender people.

== Feature film: It's Pat ==
The character's popularity gave rise to a feature-length 1994 film called It's Pat (from the lyrics of the character's theme song on Saturday Night Live). Quentin Tarantino did an uncredited rewrite of the script. The film was a critical and commercial bomb.

Julia Sweeney wrote on her Pat website, "I wrote It's Pat with Jim Emerson and Steve Hibbert. We had a great time writing and a lot of fun making the film. The movie didn't do well at the box office, not by a long shot. In fact, It's Pat became a popular example of a film so despised that it got a zero percent Rotten Tomatoes rating! I guess in that way, it's sort of a badge of honor.
But I can't help it, I love this film. It has so many people in it who I love, and loved. Many are dead: Charlie Rocket, who played Kyle, and Julie Hayden who played his wife (who died of cancer a couple of years after the film premiered,) my dad who played the priest who married us, and my brother Mike who had one line at the wedding shower of Pat and Chris. And there are so many good friends in the film too: Kathy Griffin and Dave Foley and Kathy Najimy and Tim Stack and Tim Meadows. And the band Ween! We had so much fun together."

=== Plot ===
Pat meets Chris, another sexually-ambiguous character, played by Dave Foley. (On SNL, Chris had been played by Dana Carvey.) They quickly fall in love, and they propose to each other at exactly the same time. Before the wedding, Chris breaks up with Pat due to Pat's arrogance and lack of direction in life; Pat has a brief stint in a rock band, and Pat starts to believe that they are going to be an overnight celebrity. Meanwhile, Pat has become an object of obsession of a neighbor (Charles Rocket), who is so determined to discover Pat's sex that he goes insane. Pat's sex is never revealed in the film. At the end of the film, Pat and Chris are reunited, and, in an epilogue, they marry.

=== Book ===
Sweeney helped co-write It's Pat!: My Life Exposed, a book which coincided with the film's release. Pat's sex is not revealed within its 96 pages.

== Pat's gender ==
The character has been described as "hermaphroditic" in the book The Guide to United States Popular Culture. The book Creating Contexts for Learning and Self-authorship: Constructive-developmental Pedagogy, states that the character's "gender is never revealed". Sweeney herself has not confirmed Pat's gender and denies that Pat is transgender.

Norm Macdonald said that after he joined the show, on the night the cast watched the debut of Late Night with Conan O'Brien, Chris Farley "said 'I gotta tell you a secret about SNL' ... He secreted me into this room, he locked it, made sure it wasn't bugged and everything ... I was very honored to have this. And then his secret was, he said, 'This doesn't go past these walls. Pat…IS A WOMAN!'"

== See also ==
- Recurring Saturday Night Live characters and sketches
