= Wayne's World =

SNL sketch

"Wayne's World" is a comedy franchise originally created by Mike Myers and developed with Dana Carvey. The sketches and films focus on Wayne Campbell (Myers) and Garth Algar (Carvey), co-hosts of a local public-access television program in Aurora, Illinois called Wayne's World. The character of Wayne first appeared as an off-camera character on MuchMusic before evolving, in 1987, into an on-camera character in a segment titled "Wayne's Power Minute" on the CBC Television series It's Only Rock & Roll.

The segment further evolved into a recurring sketch on Saturday Night Live primarily from 1989 to 1994 (with additional segments in 2011 and 2015). During their time on Saturday Night Live, Wayne's World spawned two films, Wayne's World (1992) and Wayne's World 2 (1993). The series also produced a VCR board game titled Wayne's World in 1992. Three video games (an adventure game and two platform games), all titled Wayne's World were released in 1993, variously for NES, Super NES, Sega Genesis, Game Boy and MS-DOS. Several of the series' catchphrases have since entered the pop-culture lexicon.

== Characters and format ==
The sketch centered on a local public-access television program in Aurora, Illinois, hosted by Wayne Campbell (Mike Myers, the same actor from "Wayne's Power Minute"), an enthusiastic long-haired metalhead. Wayne lives with his parents and broadcasts his show "live" from the basement of their house every Friday evening at 10:30. A prototype of the Wayne character had appeared several years prior on CITY-TV in Toronto's overnight show City Limits. The show was co-hosted by Wayne's timid and sometimes high-strung, yet equally metal-loving sidekick and best friend, Garth Algar (Dana Carvey). Carvey developed this character based on his brother.

In the early sketches, Wayne and Garth are high school students, and their guests on the show included their teachers (including one played by Ed O'Neill, who would later play a very similar character in both films), and other students from school (such as Nancy, a "babe" played by Jan Hooks). Other frequent guests included Garth's father, "Beev" (played by Phil Hartman), so named because of his teeth. He was often ridiculed by Wayne despite the fact that he was married to Hillary Algar (Candice Bergen), whom Wayne considers a "babe".

The show would open with Wayne and Garth singing the opening theme, accompanied by Wayne's frenetic strumming of his guitar, and Garth drumming on his lap with drumsticks. The two would introduce themselves (Garth: "Party on, Wayne." Wayne: "Party on, Garth.") and then proceed into their various exploits, including discussions of their love of hard rock bands and "babes", as well as juvenile antics, such as the "Extreme Close-Up" (where a camera would zoom in on Wayne and Garth as they screamed) and tricking their unsuspecting guests into saying vulgar words. Garth would frequently get overexcited and lose control, upon which Wayne would have to tell him, "Take your Ritalin."

Sketches also often included dream sequences where Wayne and Garth imagine themselves in fantasy settings. The sequences were introduced with Wayne and Garth imitating a fade-out by waving their arms in front of them and imitating a commonly used fade-out sound effect accompanied by an excerpt from Gary Wright's "Dream Weaver". Notable dream sequences include Wayne defeating Wayne Gretzky in a one-on-one hockey game, upon which Janet Jones runs to kiss Wayne, and Wayne and Garth meeting Madonna in a spoof of her Madonna: Truth or Dare film and controversial music video for "Justify My Love". Wayne dares Madonna to make out with him while Garth is seen dancing in a parody of the video.

In later appearances Wayne and Garth appear to be young adults (although Wayne still lives with his parents—a theme which would carry over to the first film), and their discussions shifted more towards current events and pop-culture phenomena, with the show featuring actual celebrity guests. A notable sketch featured Wayne and Garth in a jam session with their idols, the rock band Aerosmith, performing an extended, hard rock version of the "Wayne's World" theme song, written by Myers and SNL music director G. E. Smith. Tom Hanks played Garth's cousin, Barry, who was an Aerosmith roadie who checked the microphone and set up the performance. This sketch was listed as moment #1 in the TV special Saturday Night Live: 101 Most Unforgettable Moments.

== Merchandise ==
Mattel released a Wayne's World VCR Board Game in 1992. The game featured a videotape with approximately 30 minutes of new footage recorded of Myers and Carvey as Wayne and Garth. A video game loosely based on the first film was released in 1993 for Nintendo Entertainment System (NES), Super Nintendo Entertainment System (SNES), Nintendo Game Boy, and Sega Genesis. There was also a PC point and click adventure. A "Wayne's World" sketchbook was also sold around the time of the premiere of the first film. It included a mail-in-offer for Wayne's trademark ballcap and showed various celebrities such as Elvira and Michael Jordan modeling the same hat Wayne wore.

"Gawain's Word", a regular segment on the children's educational show Between the Lions, takes inspiration from both the "Wayne's World" sketch and its theme song. It was also spoofed in the film Stay Tuned with the sketch "Duane's Underworld" (Myers and Carvey were offered the chance to cameo as their characters but were filming Wayne's World at the time). An episode of the sitcom Step by Step also featured character J.T. (Brandon Call) hosting his own show, appropriately titled "J.T.'s World", in which J.T. (with sidekick Cody) singing the theme song, which sounds similar to Wayne's theme. On a 1995 episode of Sesame Street, Telly Monster and Big Bird hosted "Telly's Town", which featured Myers guest starring as Wayne, though portrayed as a telegram deliverer.

The "Wayne's World" soundtrack contained the extra-long hard rock version of the theme song that was performed by Aerosmith in the famous sketch. As the song is winding down, an easter egg can be heard where Myers and Carvey are peppering the guitar riffs with quips from their other SNL characters such as "Isn't that special?" (Church Lady), "Don't look at my bum!" (Simon), "Not gonna do it! Not gonna do it!" (George H. W. Bush).

== Films ==
The sketch was adapted into a film, Wayne's World, in 1992, and a sequel, Wayne's World 2, in 1993.

== Overseas ==
In the United Kingdom, where Saturday Night Live is rarely shown, Wayne's World sketches were extracted from SNL broadcasts and individually packaged as 10-minute episodes which aired on BBC Two as part of the DEF II programming strand, simply as a tie-in with both Wayne's World movies.

== Other appearances ==
1991 MTV VMA Awards

Wayne and Garth presented the technical awards at the 1991 VMAs on MTV. The segment was pre-shot, not live on the stage, but was not shot on the standard "Wayne's basement" set. They explained the categories of visual effects, art direction, and cinematography, and show the difference between good editing and bad editing. Clips from the winning videos were then shown, after which Wayne and Garth send a message to Cindy Crawford.

MTV Specials

MTV did three hour-long specials promoting the two films, the "Wayne's World Special" in 1992, and the "Wayne's World 2 Special" and "Wayne's World Babe-a-licious Countdown" specials in 1993. Wayne and Garth hosted, showing various videos and clips from the films.

2008 MTV Movie Awards

Mike Myers and Dana Carvey reprised their roles as Wayne and Garth for the first time since 1994 at the 2008 MTV Movie Awards. Nothing about the two seems to have changed, except both are now in their late-forties/early-fifties, and Garth has grown pubic hair. The sketch features them discussing Tila Tequila and making a list about the best pornographic movie titles based on films from 2007 and 2008, which is reminiscent of the sketches during Myers and Carvey's years at Saturday Night Live.

2011 SNL reprise

In 2011, Myers and Carvey once again reprised their roles on the February 5 edition of Saturday Night Live, which Carvey hosted. Wayne's World appeared as a cold open, in which the two discuss their picks for the upcoming Oscars. They favor the movie Winter's Bone because its name lends itself to double entendres, and also joke about the Oscar hosts, James Franco and Anne Hathaway. Phil Hartman's "Cable 10 Public Access" introduction preceded the segment, in tradition with other reprised sketches (Church Chat, The Continental, etc.)

2015 SNL reprise

In 2015, Myers and Carvey again reprised their roles for the Saturday Night Live 40th Anniversary Special. In their Wayne's World segment, the two gave a Top 10 list of the things they love about SNL. The sketch also featured a cameo appearance by musical guest Kanye West who made the Top 5 and the duo humorously referencing Kanye's various interruptions of Myers, Taylor Swift and Beck. Hartman's "Cable 10" introduction again preceded the segment.

2021 Super Bowl advertisements

For Super Bowl LV, Myers and Carvey reprised their roles for several Uber Eats advertisements, with the message of supporting local businesses; Cardi B makes an appearance in a couple of the ads.

== List of SNL episodes featured ==
1. February 18, 1989 (Leslie Nielsen)
2. March 25, 1989 (Mary Tyler Moore)
3. May 13, 1989 (Wayne Gretzky)
4. September 30, 1989 (Bruce Willis)
5. December 2, 1989 (John Goodman)
6. January 13, 1990 (Ed O'Neill)
7. February 17, 1990 (Tom Hanks) (Aerosmith guest star in this skit)
8. March 24, 1990 (Debra Winger)
9. May 19, 1990 (Candice Bergen)
10. December 1, 1990 (John Goodman)
11. January 19, 1991 (Sting)
12. March 23, 1991 (Jeremy Irons)
13. May 11, 1991 (Delta Burke) (Madonna guest stars in this skit)
14. September 28, 1991 (Michael Jordan)
15. January 18, 1992 (Chevy Chase)
16. April 11, 1992 (Sharon Stone)
17. December 5, 1992 (Tom Arnold)
18. November 20, 1993 (Nicole Kidman)
19. May 14, 1994 (Heather Locklear) (Wayne fantasizes he is in Melrose Place)
20. February 5, 2011 (Dana Carvey)
21. February 15, 2015 (Saturday Night Live 40th Anniversary Special)

== See also ==
- List of recurring Saturday Night Live characters and sketches
