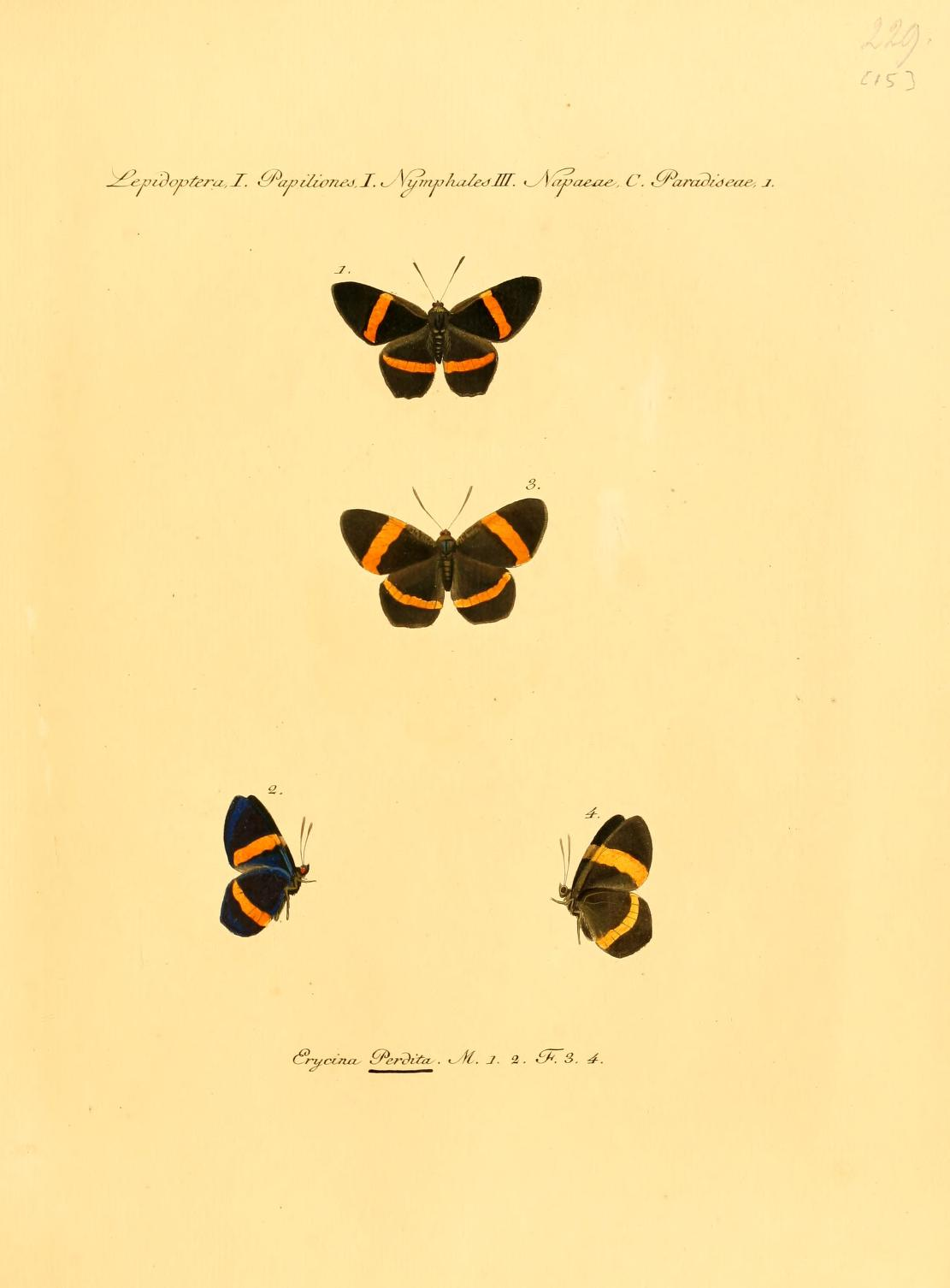
- Panara in Jacob Hübner, [1821] Sammlung exotischer Schmetterlinge

Scientific classification
- Kingdom: Animalia
- Phylum: Arthropoda
- Class: Insecta
- Order: Lepidoptera
- Family: Riodinidae
- Subfamily: Riodininae
- Genus: Panara; Doubleday, 1847

= Panara (butterfly) =

Genus of butterflies

Panara is a genus in the butterfly family Riodinidae present in the Neotropical realm.

The species in this genus closely resemble each other. They are black with an orange oblique band of the forewing (also found in Isapis and many other Riodinidae Mesene, Aricoris, Chamaelimnas, Melanis etc).They are rather strongly built and exceptionally good flyers and also sometimes fly about in day-time, the flight being somewhat like that of moths, so that they are difficult to distinguish from quite a number of similarly coloured species of Geometridae and Arctiidae found at the same places. In the hindwing the cell is possibly still shorter than in most of the other Eryrinidae; on the forewing the first subcostal vein branches off just before the cell-end, the second directly behind it. They are not so local as the other Riodinidae.

== Species ==
- Panara aureizona Butler, 1874 present in Brazil
- Panara jarbas (Drury, 1782) present in Brazil
- Panara ovifera Seitz, 1913 present in Brazil
- Panara soana Hewitson, 1875 present in Brazil
- Panara phereclus (Linnaeus, 1758); present in French Guiana, Guyana, Bolivia, Brazil and Peru.

=== References ===
- TOL
