= Panara =

Panara may refer to:

- Panara, Madhya Pradesh, a census town in India
- Panará people, an ethnic group of Brazil
- Panará language, a language of Brazil
- Panara (butterfly), a genus of butterflies
- Panara (Lithuania), a village in Varėna district municipality, Alytus County, Lithuania
- family name
  - Robert Panara (1920–2014), American deaf studies pioneer
  - Roberta Panara (born 1986), Italian swimmer

== See also ==
- Panera
- Pannaria, a genus of fungi
