= Nymphidiini =

- Ariconias glaphyra the Pantanal, Brazil

Scientific classification
- Kingdom: Animalia
- Phylum: Arthropoda
- Clade: Pancrustacea
- Class: Insecta
- Order: Lepidoptera
- Family: Riodinidae
- Subfamily: Riodininae
- Tribe: Nymphidiini; Bates, 1859

Genera
- Numerous, see text

Tribe of butterflies

The Nymphidiini are one of the larger tribes of metalmark butterflies (family Riodinidae). As numerous Riodinidae genera have not yet been unequivocally assigned to a tribe, the genus list is preliminary. The Theopina subtribe was formerly considered a distinct tribe Theopini.

== Genera ==
Subtribe Lemoniadina [see Aricorina]

- Ariconias
- Aricoris
- Juditha
- Lemonias
- Menander
- Synargis
- Thisbe
- Uraneis

Subtribe Nymphidiina

- Ahrenholzia
- Annulata
- Archaeonympha
- Argyraspila
- Behemothia
- Calicosama
- Calociasma
- Catagrammina
- Catocyclotis [inc. Harveyope]
- Diminutiva
- Dysmathia
- Hypophylla
- Joiceya
- Minotauros
- Mycastor
- Nymphidium
- Parvospila
- Periplacis
- Pseudolivendula
- Sanguinea
- Synargis
- Thenpea

Subtribe Pachythonina

- Pachythone
- Pixus
- Pseudonymphidia
- Roeberella

Subtribe Pandemina

- Adelotypa
- Calospila
- Calliona
- Livendula
- Pandemos
- Rodinia
- Setabis
- Zelotaea

Subtribe Stalachtina

- Protonymphidia
- Stalachtis

Subtribe Theopina

- Petrocerus
- Pseudotinea
- Theope

Subtribe Zabuellina

- Hallonympha
- Teenie
- Zabuella

--
