= Phaeochlaena hazara =

Scientific classification
- Kingdom: Animalia
- Phylum: Arthropoda
- Clade: Pancrustacea
- Class: Insecta
- Order: Lepidoptera
- Superfamily: Noctuoidea
- Family: Notodontidae
- Genus: Phaeochlaena
- Species: P. hazara

Binomial name
- Phaeochlaena hazara (Butler, 1871)

Synonyms
- Pericopis hazara Butler, 1871; Phaeochlaena heliconides Prout, 1918

Species of moth

Phaeochlaena hazara is a moth of the family Notodontidae first described by Arthur Gardiner Butler in 1871. It is found in Brazil, Ecuador, Peru and French Guiana.

The species is part of the tiger stripe mimicry complex and mimics Ithomia iphianassa, Stalachtis calliope and Chetone histrio.
