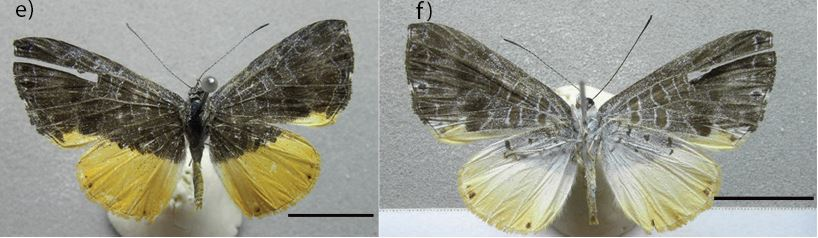

Scientific classification
- Domain: Eukaryota
- Kingdom: Animalia
- Phylum: Arthropoda
- Class: Insecta
- Order: Lepidoptera
- Family: Riodinidae
- Subfamily: Riodininae
- Tribe: Nymphidiini
- Subtribe: Nymphidiina
- Genus: Catocyclotis
- Species: C. aemulius

Binomial name
- Catocyclotis aemulius ( Fabricius, 1793)

Synonyms
- Hesperia aemulius Fabricius, 1793; Calospila geris Doubleday, 1847; Desmozona hemixanthe C. & R. Felder, 1865

= Catocyclotis aemulius =

Species of butterfly

Catocyclotis aemulius is a species of butterfly in the family Riodinidae. It is found in Brazil and Ecuador.
