= Phaeochlaena bicolor =

Scientific classification
- Kingdom: Animalia
- Phylum: Arthropoda
- Clade: Pancrustacea
- Class: Insecta
- Order: Lepidoptera
- Superfamily: Noctuoidea
- Family: Notodontidae
- Genus: Phaeochlaena
- Species: P. bicolor

Binomial name
- Phaeochlaena bicolor (Möschler, 1877)

Synonyms
- Campylona bicolor Moschler, 1877; Campylona costidentata Dognin, 1908

Species of moth

Phaeochlaena bicolor is a moth of the family Notodontidae first described by Heinrich Benno Möschler in 1877. It is found in Suriname, French Guiana, Colombia and Ecuador.

== See also ==
- Miller, James S. (2009). "Generic revision of the Dioptinae (Lepidoptera: Noctuoidea: Notodontidae) Part 1: Dioptini". Bulletin of the American Museum of Natural History. 321 (2): 1–676. hdl:2246/5978.
