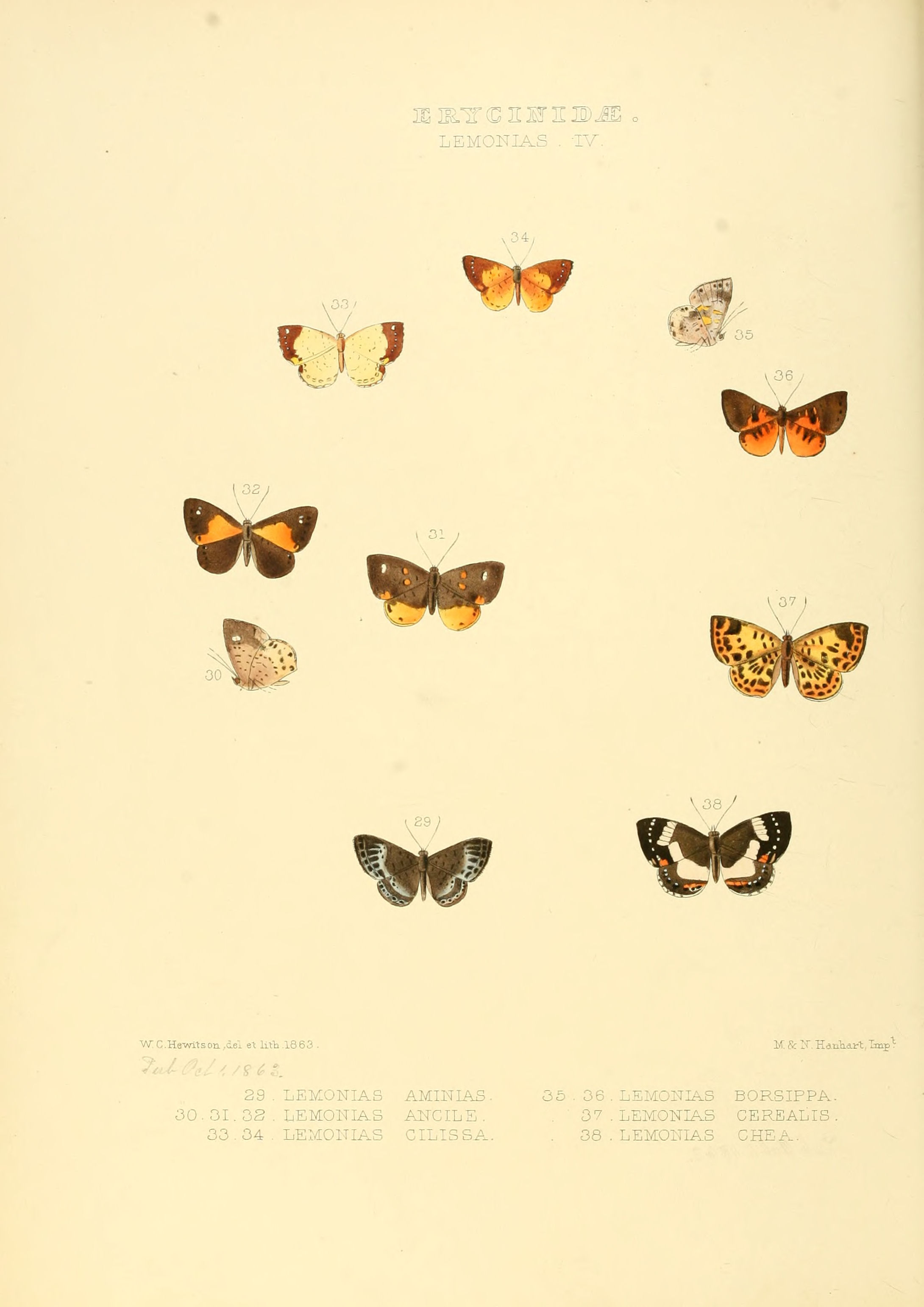
- Adelotypa borsippa figures 35 and 36

Scientific classification
- Kingdom: Animalia
- Phylum: Arthropoda
- Clade: Pancrustacea
- Class: Insecta
- Order: Lepidoptera
- Family: Riodinidae
- Subfamily: Riodininae
- Tribe: Nymphidiini
- Subtribe: Pandemina
- Genus: Adelotypa; Warren, 1895

Species
- See text

= Adelotypa =

Genus of butterflies

Adelotypa is a genus of butterflies in the family Riodinidae. They are found in South America.

The type species of the genus is Adelotypa xanthobrunnea Warren, 1895, which was mistakenly described as a Geometridae species.

== Species ==
As of 2023, the following species remain in the genus.

- Adelotypa bolena (Butler, 1867) Brazil, Paraguay
- Adelotypa borsippa (Hewitson, 1863) Brazil

The following species have been transferred elsewhere or synonymised. Listed alphabetically:

- Adelotypa annulifera (Godman, 1903) – cherry-spot
- Adelotypa argiella (Bates, 1868) Brazil
- Adelotypa asemna (Stichel, 1910) Bolivia, Brazil
- Adelotypa curulis (Hewitson, 1874) Ecuador, Bolivia
- Adelotypa densemaculata (Hewitson, 1870) Panama, Nicaragua, Colombia, Ecuador, Peru
- Adelotypa eudocia (Godman & Salvin, 1897) Mexico, Costa Rica
- Adelotypa glauca (Godman & Salvin, [1886]) Costa Rica, Venezuela
- Adelotypa malca (Schaus, 1902) Brazil
- Adelotypa mollis (Butler, 1877) Brazil
- Adelotypa penthea (Cramer, [1777]) French Guiana, Guyana, Suriname, Brazil, Peru
- Adelotypa sejuncta (Stichel, 1910) Brazil
- Adelotypa tinea (Bates, 1868) Brazil
- Adelotypa trinitatis (Lathy, 1932) Ecuador, Trinidad and Tobago
- Adelotypa zerna (Hewitson, 1872) Bolivia, Brazil
