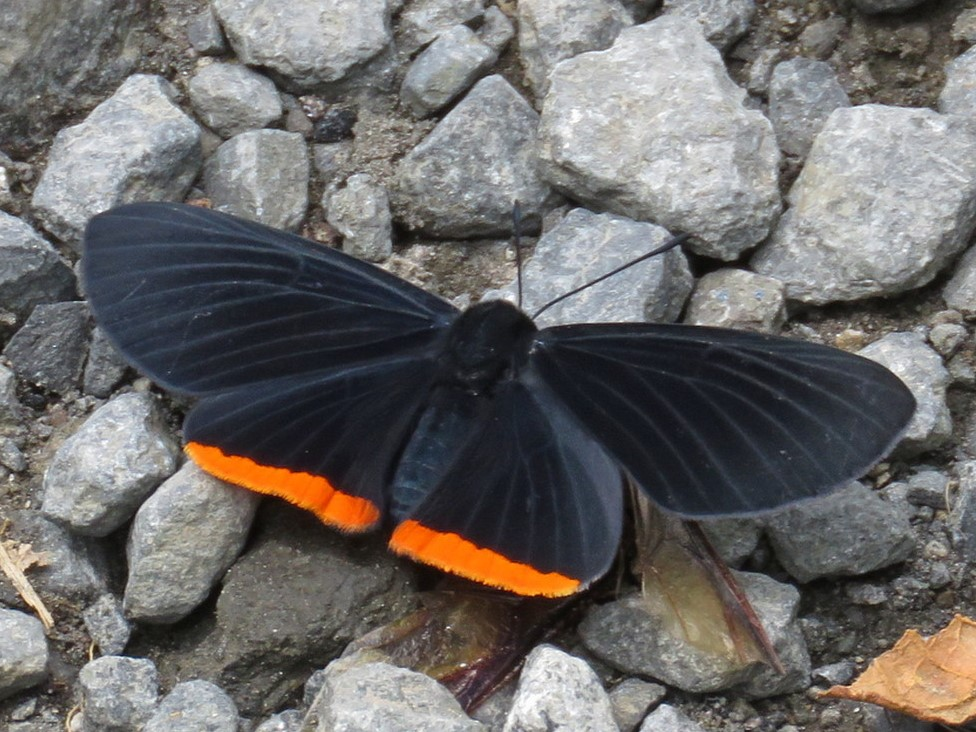

Scientific classification
- Kingdom: Animalia
- Phylum: Arthropoda
- Clade: Pancrustacea
- Class: Insecta
- Order: Lepidoptera
- Family: Riodinidae
- Genus: Melanis
- Species: M. cinaron

Binomial name
- Melanis cinaron (C. & R. Felder, 1861)

Synonyms
- Limnas cinaron C. & R. Felder, 1861; Aculhua inca Röber, 1895; Lymnas cinaron

= Melanis cinaron =

Species of butterfly

Melanis cinaron, the orange-bordered pixie, is a species of butterfly in the family Riodinidae.

== Description ==
Melanis cinaron has a wingspan of about 38 millimetres (1.5 in). The upperside of the wings is black with an orange border on the hindwings. The larvae feed on the leaves of Fabaceae species.

== Distribution and habitat ==
This species is present in Colombia, northern Brazil, Ecuador and Peru. It lives in the rainforests at an elevation of 900–2,000 metres (3,000–6,600 ft) above sea level.
