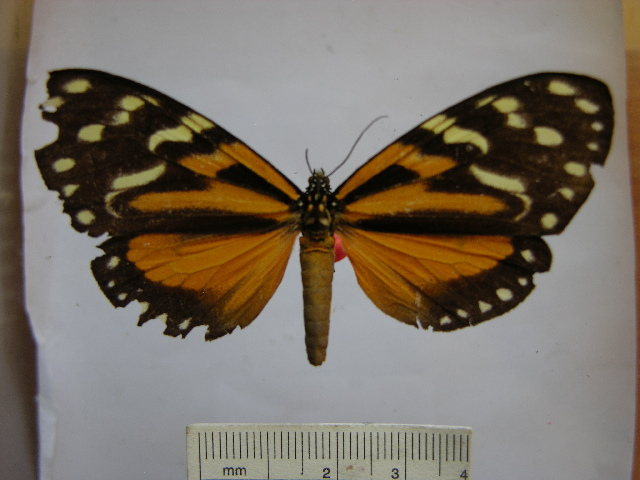

Scientific classification
- Domain: Eukaryota
- Kingdom: Animalia
- Phylum: Arthropoda
- Class: Insecta
- Order: Lepidoptera
- Superfamily: Noctuoidea
- Family: Erebidae
- Subfamily: Arctiinae
- Genus: Chetone
- Species: C. felderi

Binomial name
- Chetone felderi Boisduval, 1870

= Chetone felderi =

Species of moth

Chetone felderi is a moth of the family Erebidae. It was described by Jean Baptiste Boisduval in 1870. It is found in Nicaragua and Panama.
