= Chetone suprema =

Scientific classification
- Domain: Eukaryota
- Kingdom: Animalia
- Phylum: Arthropoda
- Class: Insecta
- Order: Lepidoptera
- Superfamily: Noctuoidea
- Family: Erebidae
- Subfamily: Arctiinae
- Genus: Chetone
- Species: C. suprema

Binomial name
- Chetone suprema (Hering, 1925)

Synonyms
- Pericopis suprema Hering, 1925

Species of moth

Chetone suprema is a moth of the family Erebidae. It was described by Erich Martin Hering in 1925. It is found in Colombia.
