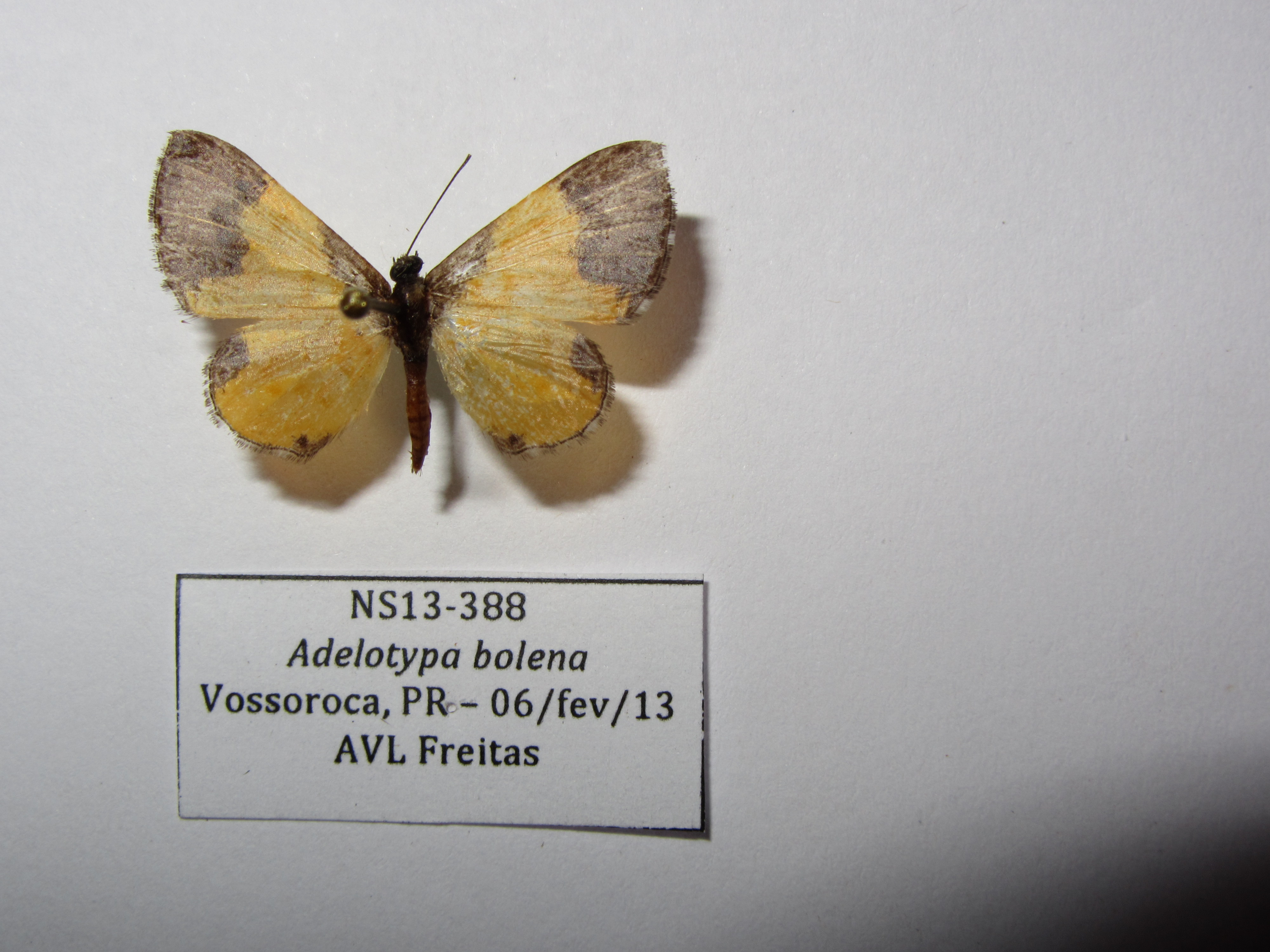

Scientific classification
- Kingdom: Animalia
- Phylum: Arthropoda
- Class: Insecta
- Order: Lepidoptera
- Family: Riodinidae
- Genus: Adelotypa
- Species: A. bolena

Binomial name
- Adelotypa bolena (Butler, 1867)

Synonyms
- Lemonias bolena Butler, 1867; Calospila bolena Doubleday, 1847; Adelotypa xanthobrunnea Warren, 1895

= Adelotypa bolena =

Species of butterfly

Adelotypa bolena is a species of butterfly in the family Riodinidae. It is found in Brazil and Paraguay. It is the type species of the genus Adelotypa.

== Description ==
Bright yellow, the base of the wings, a broad apical band of the forewing, the apex and anal angle of the hindwing resembling the colour of the trunk of a tree. The shape of the broad apical spot seems to be different at every habitat. Beneath dark-yellow on light-yellow, marked with dashes shape of the broad apical spot seems to be different at every habitat. Found singly and not common; flies in day-time and likes to rest on the trunks of trees.
