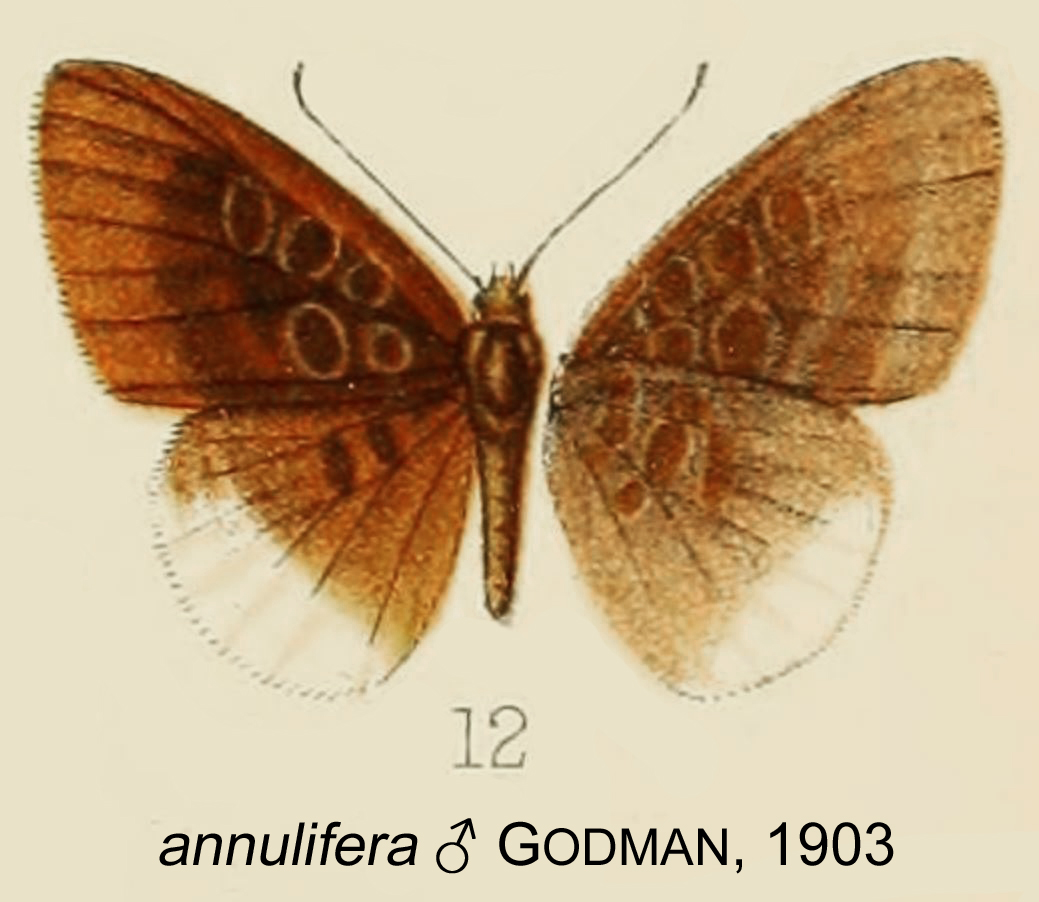

Scientific classification
- Kingdom: Animalia
- Phylum: Arthropoda
- Class: Insecta
- Order: Lepidoptera
- Family: Riodinidae
- Genus: Adelotypa
- Species: A. annulifera

Binomial name
- Adelotypa annulifera (Godman, 1903)

Synonyms
- Lemonias annulifera Godman, 1903; Echenais torquata Stichel, 1916

= Adelotypa annulifera =

Species of butterfly

Adelotypa annulifera is a species of riodinid butterfly found in South America (Guyana, Bolivia, Peru). It was first described by Frederick DuCane Godman in 1903.

== Ecology ==
In 2016, researchers Phil Torres and Aaron Pomerantz in the Tambopata National Reserve in Peru discovered that the caterpillars of A. annulifera engaged in myrmecophily. They live on the shoots of bamboo species in the genus Guadua, providing sugary secretions to ants in exchange for protection. Four ant species have been observed tending the caterpillars: Ectatomma tuberculatum, Pheidole sp., Megalomyrmex balzani, and Paraponera clavata. Adult butterflies exhibited kleptoparasitism by taking fluids from nectaries also fed on by ants, without providing a reward to the ants.
