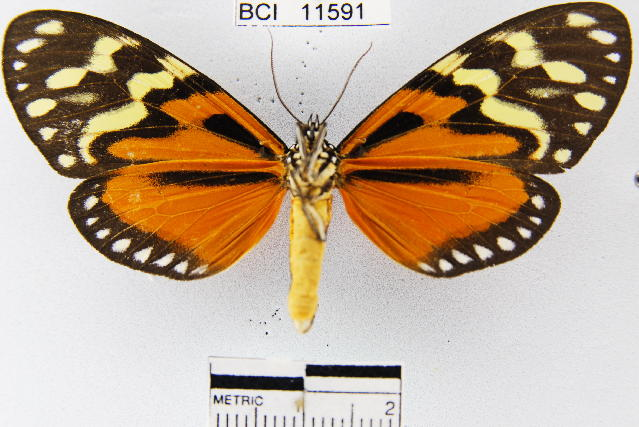

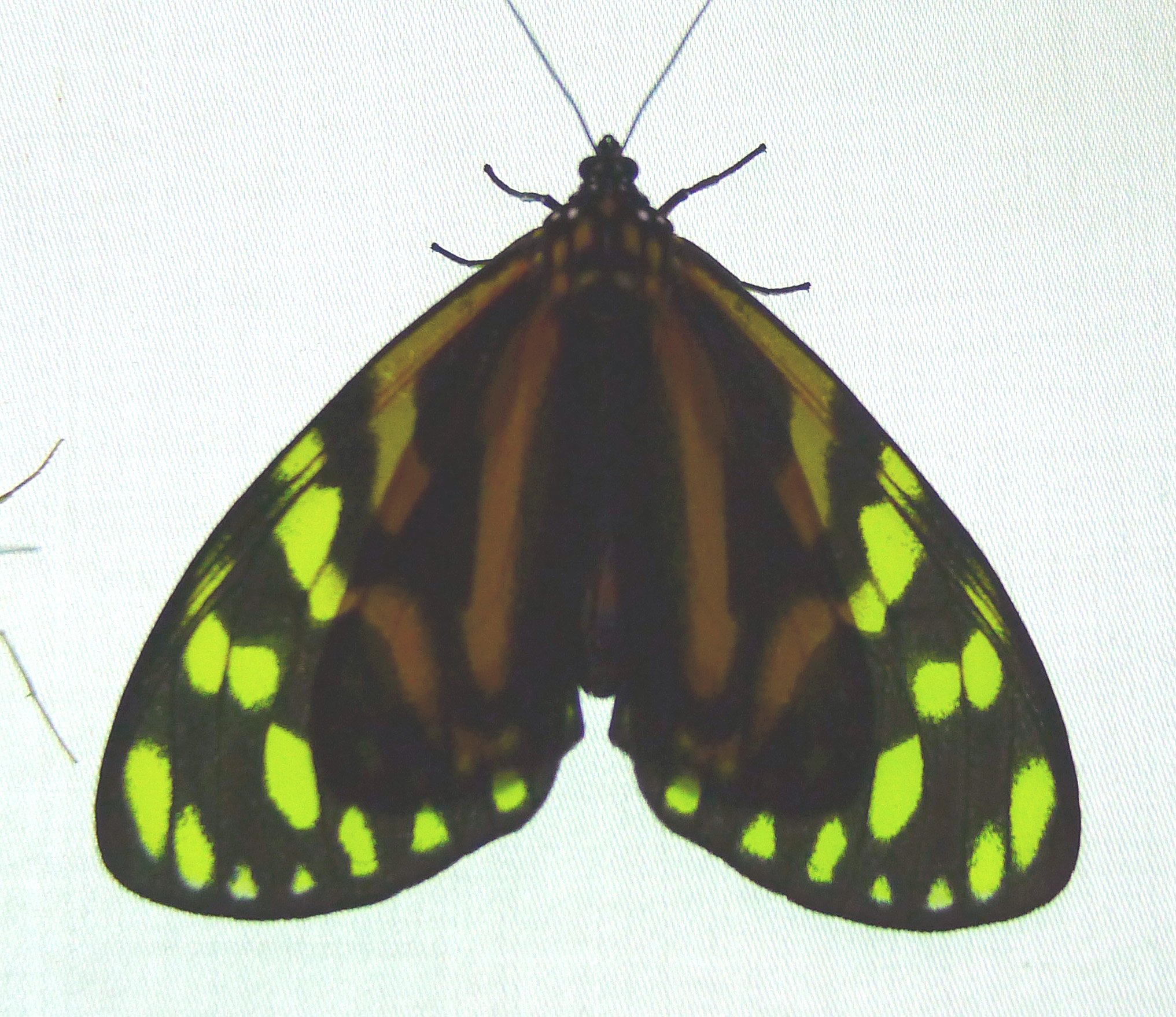

Scientific classification
- Kingdom: Animalia
- Phylum: Arthropoda
- Class: Insecta
- Order: Lepidoptera
- Superfamily: Noctuoidea
- Family: Erebidae
- Subfamily: Arctiinae
- Genus: Chetone
- Species: C. angulosa

Binomial name
- Chetone angulosa (Walker, 1854)

Synonyms
- Pericopis angulosa Walker, 1854; Chetone heliconides Boisduval, 1870; Pericopis irenides Butler, 1872

= Chetone angulosa =

Species of moth

Chetone angulosa is a moth of the family Erebidae. It was described by Francis Walker in 1854. It is found in Central America and northern South America, including Venezuela, Guatemala, Belize, Panama and Costa Rica.
