= Phaeochlaena amazonica =

Scientific classification
- Kingdom: Animalia
- Phylum: Arthropoda
- Clade: Pancrustacea
- Class: Insecta
- Order: Lepidoptera
- Superfamily: Noctuoidea
- Family: Notodontidae
- Genus: Phaeochlaena
- Species: P. amazonica

Binomial name
- Phaeochlaena amazonica H. Druce, 1899

Synonyms
- Campylona brunnea Warren, 1904

Species of moth

Phaeochlaena amazonica is a moth of the family Notodontidae first described by Herbert Druce in 1899. It is found in Bolivia, Brazil and Venezuela.
