= Chetone isse =

Scientific classification
- Kingdom: Animalia
- Phylum: Arthropoda
- Clade: Pancrustacea
- Class: Insecta
- Order: Lepidoptera
- Superfamily: Noctuoidea
- Family: Erebidae
- Subfamily: Arctiinae
- Genus: Chetone
- Species: C. isse

Binomial name
- Chetone isse (Hübner, 1831)

Synonyms
- Episteme isse Hübner, [1831]

Species of moth

Chetone isse is a moth of the family Erebidae. It was described by Jacob Hübner in 1831. It is found in Brazil.
