= Archaeonympha =

Scientific classification
- Kingdom: Animalia
- Phylum: Arthropoda
- Class: Insecta
- Order: Lepidoptera
- Family: Riodinidae
- Tribe: Nymphidiini
- Genus: Archaeonympha; Hall, 1998

Species
- See text

Genus of butterflies

Archaeonympha is a genus in the family Riodinidae. They are resident in the Americas.

== Species list ==
- Archaeonympha drepana (Bates, 1868) Guyana, Brazil, Peru.
- Archaeonympha smalli Hall & Harvey, 1998 Panama
- Archaeonympha urichi (Vane-Wright, 1994) French Guiana, Trinidad and Tobago

=== Sources ===
- Archaeonympha at Markku Savela's website on Lepidoptera
