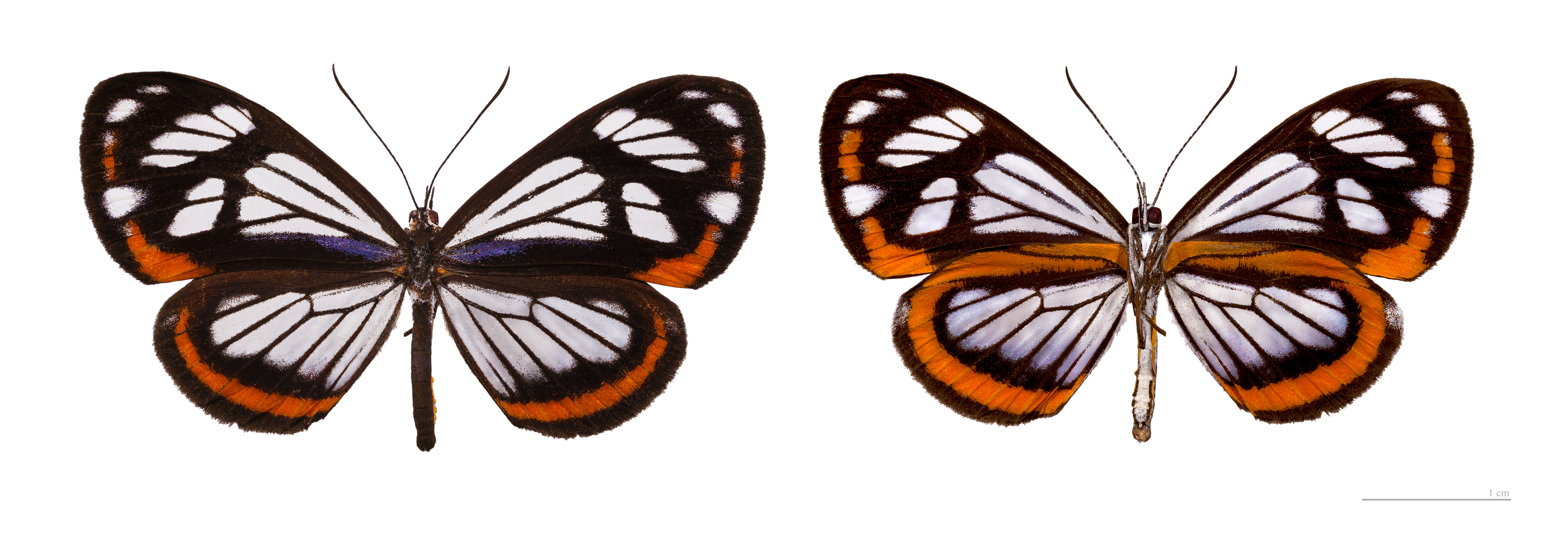

Scientific classification
- Kingdom: Animalia
- Phylum: Arthropoda
- Class: Insecta
- Order: Lepidoptera
- Family: Riodinidae
- Genus: Stalachtis
- Species: S. phaedusa

Binomial name
- Stalachtis phaedusa (Hübner, [1813])

Synonyms
- Nerëis phaedusa Hübner, [1813]; Stalachtis phaedusa squalida Stichel, 1931; Heliconius phaedusa duvalii Perty, 1833; Stalachtis phaedusa var. egaensis Bates, 1861; Stalachtis phaedusa f. vidua Stichel, 1916; Stalachtis trangeri Schaus, 1928; Papilio zephyritis Dalman, 1823; Nerias margarita C. & R. Felder, 1865; Stalachtis evelina Butler, 1870

= Stalachtis phaedusa =

Species of butterfly

Stalachtis phaedusa is a species of butterfly of the family Riodinidae. It is found in South America.

== Subspecies ==
- Stalachtis phaedusa phaedusa
- Stalachtis phaedusa duvalii (Perty, 1833) (Brazil)
- Stalachtis phaedusa exul Seitz, 1917 (French Guiana)
- Stalachtis phaedusa phaloe Staudinger, [1887] (Peru, Brazil: Amazonas)
- Stalachtis phaedusa trangeri Schaus, 1928 (Colombia)
- Stalachtis phaedusa zephyritis (Dalman, 1823) (Surinam)
