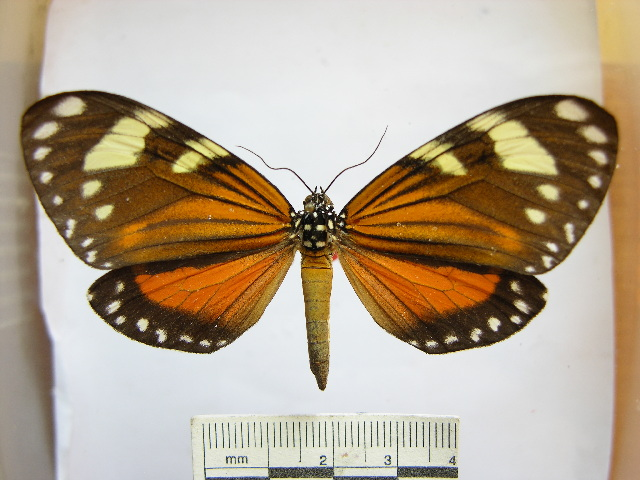
- Chetone salvini

Scientific classification
- Domain: Eukaryota
- Kingdom: Animalia
- Phylum: Arthropoda
- Class: Insecta
- Order: Lepidoptera
- Superfamily: Noctuoidea
- Family: Erebidae
- Subfamily: Arctiinae
- Subtribe: Pericopina
- Genus: Chetone; Boisduval, 1870

= Chetone =

Genus of moths

Chetone is a genus of tiger moths in the family Erebidae. The genus was erected by Jean Baptiste Boisduval in 1870.

== Species ==
- Chetone angulosa Walker, 1854
- Chetone catilina Cramer, 1775
- Chetone conjuncta Hering, 1925
- Chetone decisa Walker, 1854
- Chetone felderi Boisduval, 1870
- Chetone histrio Boisduval, 1870
- Chetone histriomorpha Hering, 1925
- Chetone hydra Butler, 1871
- Chetone isse Hübner, 1831
- Chetone ithomia Boisduval, 1870
- Chetone ithrana Butler, 1871
- Chetone kenara Butler, 1871
- Chetone malankiatae Strand, 1921
- Chetone meta Druce, 1895
- Chetone mimica Butler, 1874
- Chetone phaeba Boisduval, 1870
- Chetone phyleis Druce, 1885
- Chetone salvini Boisduval, 1870
- Chetone studyi Hering, 1925
- Chetone suprema Hering, 1925
- Chetone variifasciata Hering, 1930
- Chetone zuleika Becker & Goodger, 2013
