= Chetone malankiatae =

Scientific classification
- Domain: Eukaryota
- Kingdom: Animalia
- Phylum: Arthropoda
- Class: Insecta
- Order: Lepidoptera
- Superfamily: Noctuoidea
- Family: Erebidae
- Subfamily: Arctiinae
- Genus: Chetone
- Species: C. malankiatae

Binomial name
- Chetone malankiatae (Strand, 1921)

Synonyms
- Pericopis malankiatae Strand, 1921

Species of moth

Chetone malankiatae is a moth of the family Erebidae. It was described by Embrik Strand in 1921. It is found in Peru.
