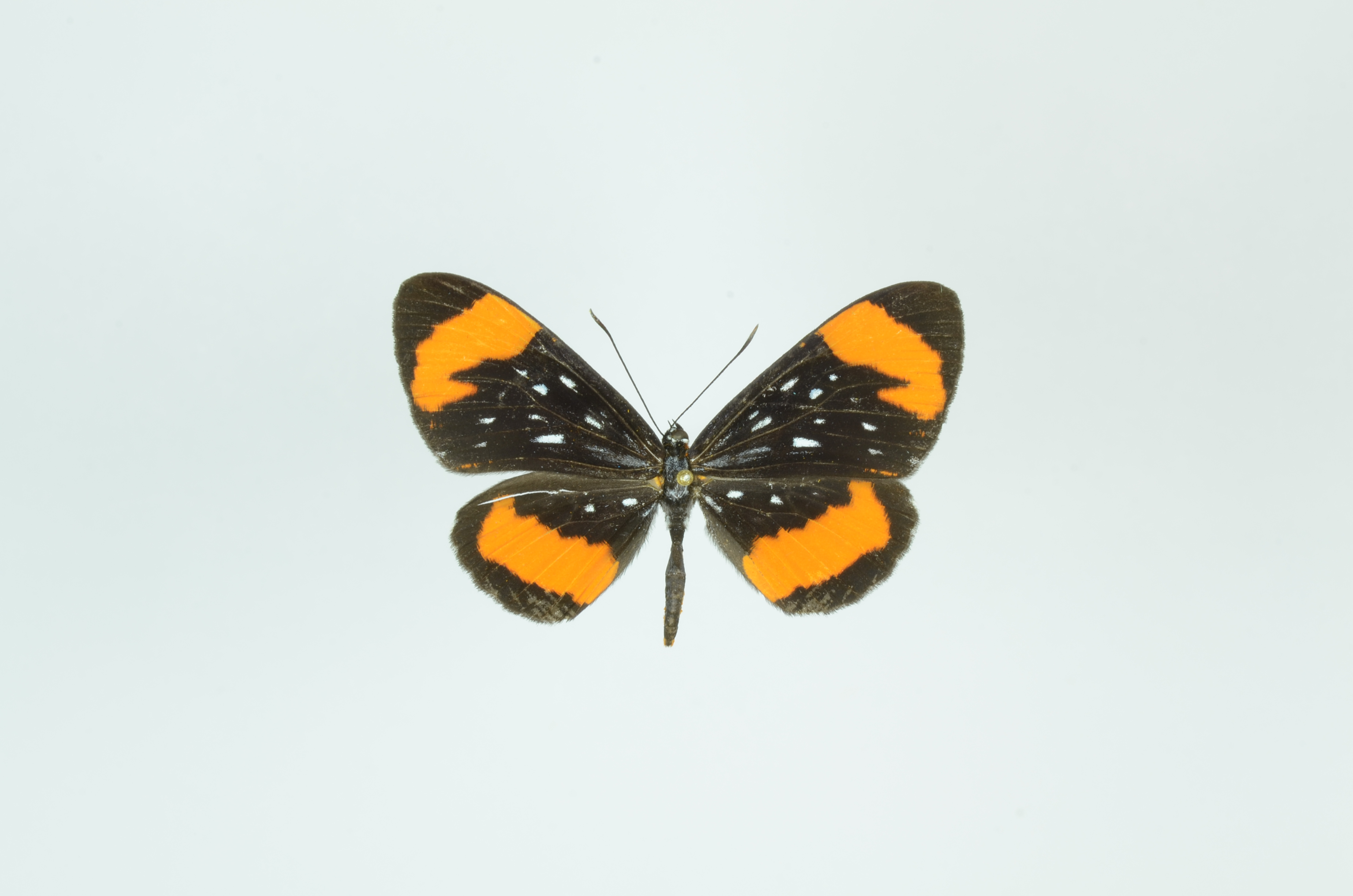

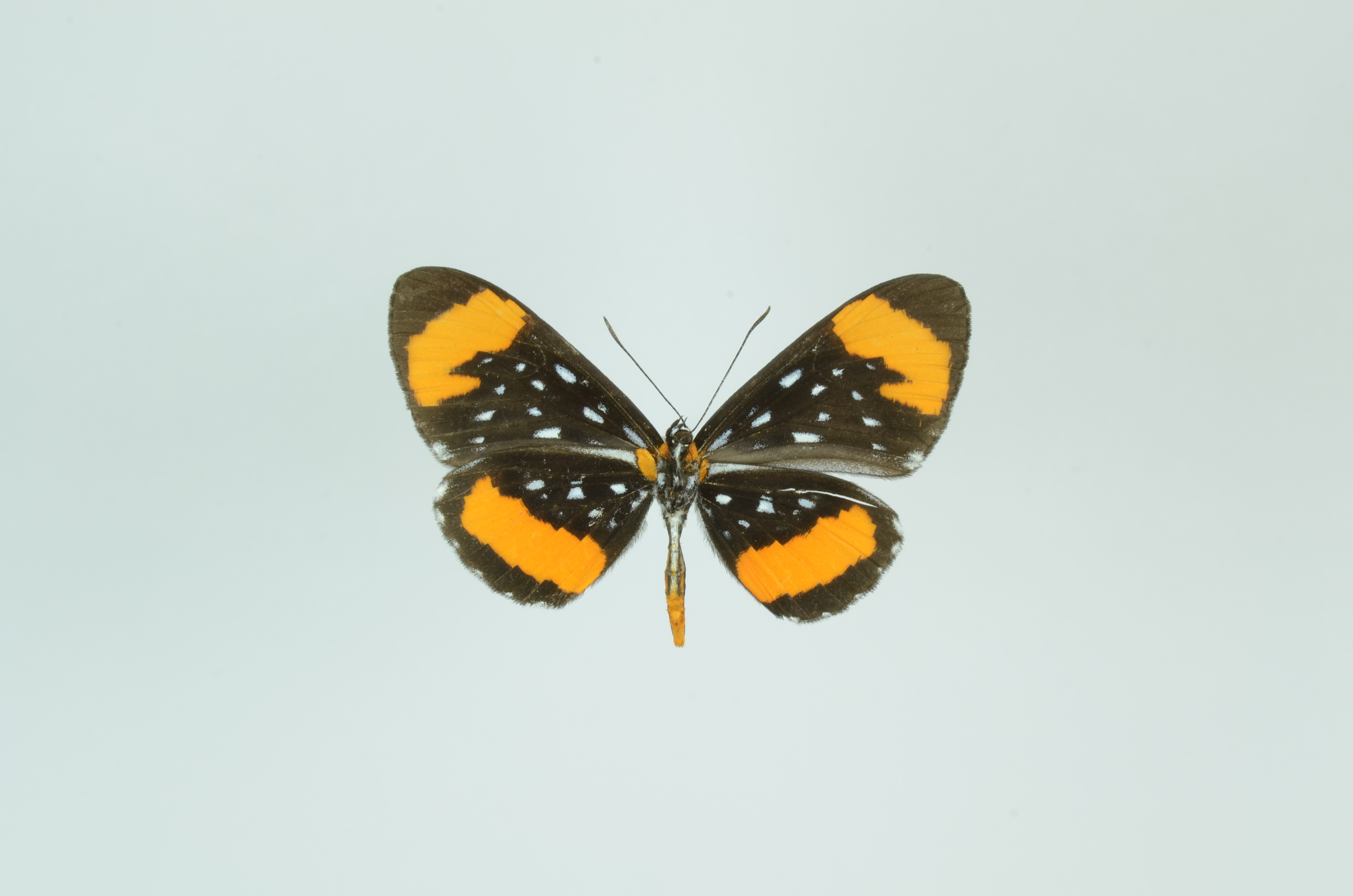

Scientific classification
- Kingdom: Animalia
- Phylum: Arthropoda
- Class: Insecta
- Order: Lepidoptera
- Family: Riodinidae
- Genus: Stalachtis
- Species: S. euterpe

Binomial name
- Stalachtis euterpe (Linnaeus, 1758)

Synonyms
- Papilio euterpe Linnaeus, 1758

= Stalachtis euterpe =

Species of butterfly

Stalachtis euterpe is a species of butterfly of the family Riodinidae. It is found in the Guianas and the Lower Amazon.

== Subspecies ==
- Stalachtis euterpe euterpe
- Stalachtis euterpe adelpha Staudinger, 1888 (Brazil: Amazonas)
- Stalachtis euterpe latefasciata Staudinger, 1888 (Peru)
