= Phaeochlaena costaricensis =

Scientific classification
- Kingdom: Animalia
- Phylum: Arthropoda
- Clade: Pancrustacea
- Class: Insecta
- Order: Lepidoptera
- Superfamily: Noctuoidea
- Family: Notodontidae
- Genus: Phaeochlaena
- Species: P. costaricensis

Binomial name
- Phaeochlaena costaricensis Miller, 2008

Species of moth

Phaeochlaena costaricensis is a moth of the family Notodontidae first described by James S. Miller in 2008. It is found in Costa Rica and Panama.

The length of the forewings is 15-18.4 mm for males and 18-21.5 mm for females.
