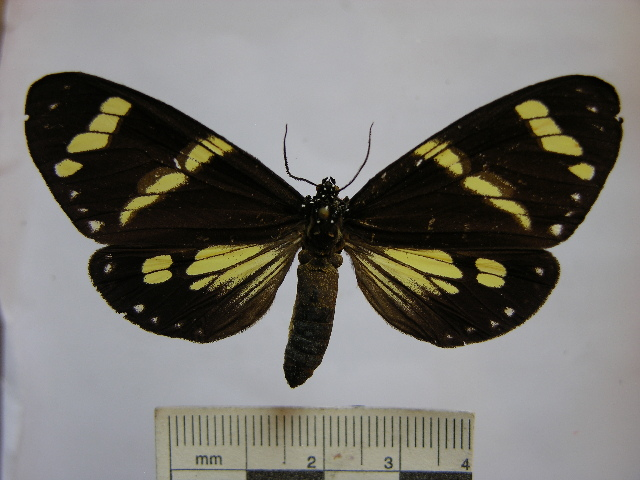

Scientific classification
- Domain: Eukaryota
- Kingdom: Animalia
- Phylum: Arthropoda
- Class: Insecta
- Order: Lepidoptera
- Superfamily: Noctuoidea
- Family: Erebidae
- Subfamily: Arctiinae
- Genus: Chetone
- Species: C. catilina

Binomial name
- Chetone catilina (Cramer, 1775)

Synonyms
- Phalaena catilina Cramer, [1775]; Papilio nasica Fabricius, 1793; Pericopis perspicua Walker, 1854; Pericopis angustilineata Fleming, 1949

= Chetone catilina =

Species of moth

Chetone catilina is a moth of the family Erebidae. It was described by Pieter Cramer in 1775. It is found in French Guiana, Venezuela and Suriname.

== Subspecies ==
- Chetone catilina catilina (Suriname)
- Chetone catilina angustilineata (Fleming, 1949) (Venezuela)
