= Chetone phaeba =

Scientific classification
- Domain: Eukaryota
- Kingdom: Animalia
- Phylum: Arthropoda
- Class: Insecta
- Order: Lepidoptera
- Superfamily: Noctuoidea
- Family: Erebidae
- Subfamily: Arctiinae
- Genus: Chetone
- Species: C. phaeba

Binomial name
- Chetone phaeba Boisduval, 1870

Synonyms
- Pericopis phoeba

Species of moth

Chetone phaeba is a moth of the family Erebidae. It was described by Jean Baptiste Boisduval in 1870. It is found in Guatemala.
