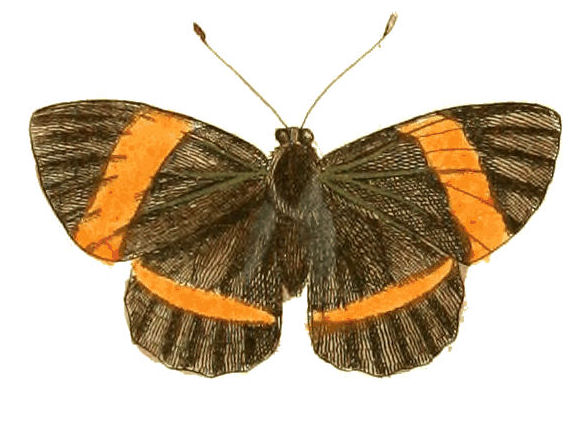
- Illustration by Dru Drury

Scientific classification
- Kingdom: Animalia
- Phylum: Arthropoda
- Class: Insecta
- Order: Lepidoptera
- Family: Riodinidae
- Genus: Panara
- Species: P. jarbas

Binomial name
- Panara jarbas (Drury, 1782)

Synonyms
- Papilio jarbas Drury, 1782; Papilio thisbe Fabricius, 1781 (nec Linnaeus); Hesperia perditus Fabricius, 1793; Panara perdita Hübner, [1819]; Panara episatnius Prittwitz, 1865; Panara arctifascia Butler, 1874; Panara eclypsis Seitz, 1913; Panara thymele Stichel, 1909

= Panara jarbas =

Species of butterfly

Panara jarbas is a species in the butterfly family Riodinidae found in Brazil. It was first described by Dru Drury in 1782.

== Description ==
Upperside. Antennae black. Thorax and abdomen nearly black. Wings brownish black. An orange-coloured bar, about a quarter of an inch broad, crosses the anterior wings from the middle of the anterior edges to the lower corners, from whence another of half that breadth crosses the posterior wings, meeting just below the anus.

Underside. Tongue, legs, breast, and abdomen dark brown, the latter having a small orange streak on each side. Wings coloured as on the upperside. Margins of the wings entire. Wing-span 1 3/4 inches (44 mm).

== Subspecies ==
- Panara jarbas jarbas (Brazil: western Rio de Janeiro, south-eastern Minas Gerais, northern Espirito Santo, Pernambuco)
- Panara jarbas episatnius Prittwitz, 1865 (Brazil: Rio de Janeiro, Espírito Santo, eastern Minas Gerais)
- Panara jarbas thymele Stichel, 1909 (Brazil: Bahia, western Parana, São Paulo, Rio de Janeiro)
