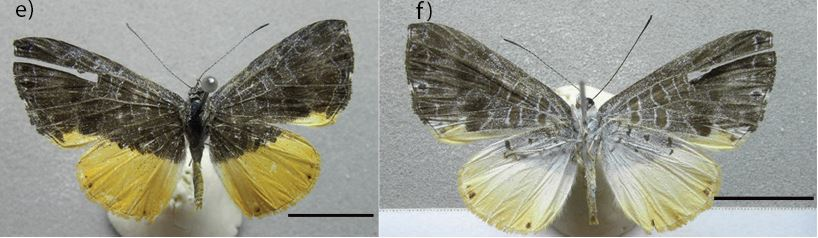
- Catocyclotis Aemulius

Scientific classification
- Domain: Eukaryota
- Kingdom: Animalia
- Phylum: Arthropoda
- Class: Insecta
- Order: Lepidoptera
- Family: Riodinidae
- Tribe: Nymphidiini
- Subtribe: Nymphidiina
- Genus: Catocyclotis; Stichel, 1911

= Catocyclotis =

Genus of butterfly

Catocyclotis is a genus in the butterfly family Riodinidae present only in the Neotropical realm.

== Species ==
- Catocyclotis aemulius (Fabricius, 1793)
- Catocyclotis adelina (Butler, 1872)
- Catocyclotis elpinice (Godman, 1903)
