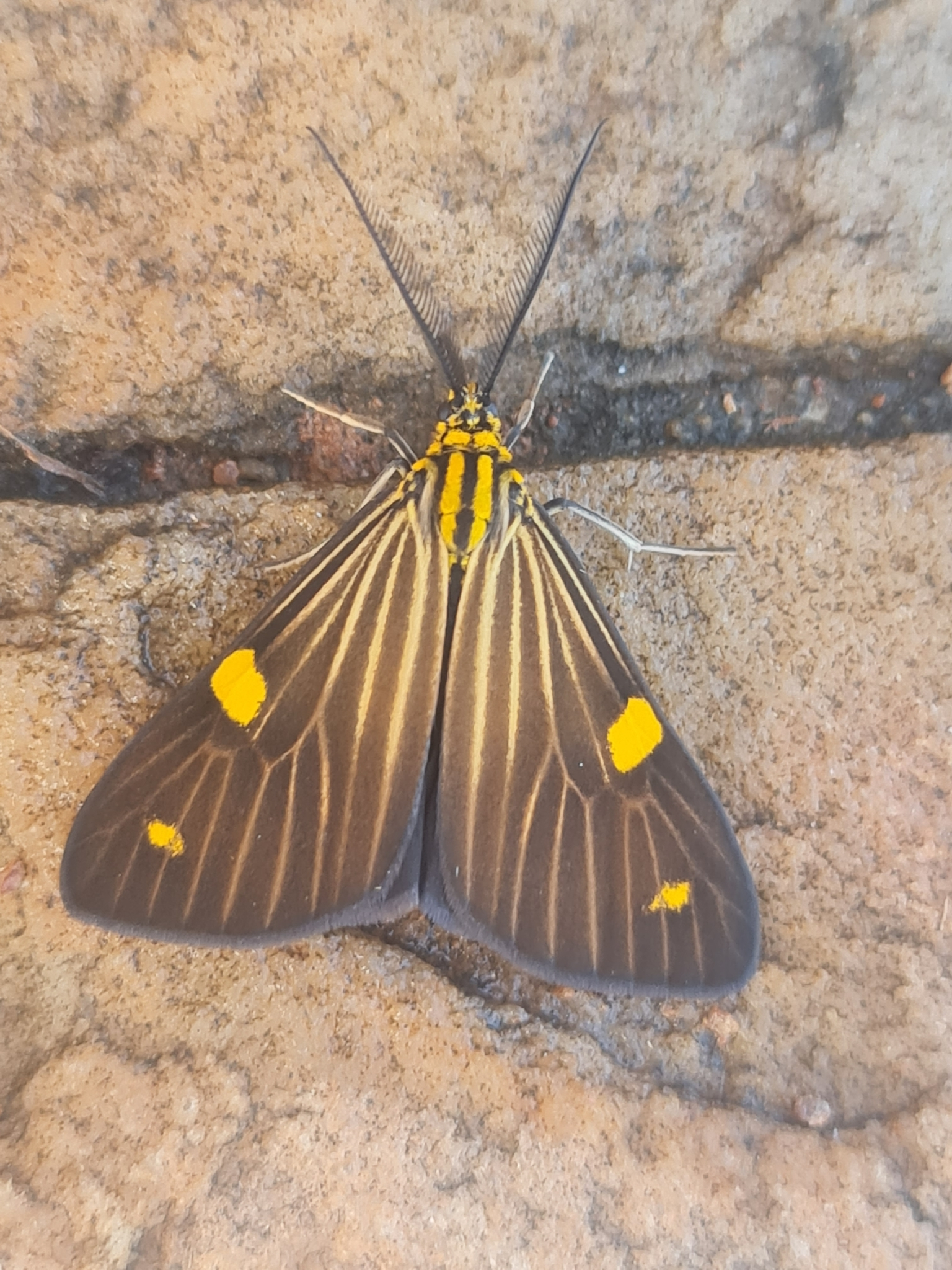
- Phaeichlaena lampra

Scientific classification
- Kingdom: Animalia
- Phylum: Arthropoda
- Clade: Pancrustacea
- Class: Insecta
- Order: Lepidoptera
- Superfamily: Noctuoidea
- Family: Notodontidae
- Genus: Phaeochlaena
- Species: P. lampra

Binomial name
- Phaeochlaena lampra L. B. Prout, 1918

= Phaeochlaena lampra =

Species of moth

Phaeochlaena lampra is a moth of the family Notodontidae first described by Louis Beethoven Prout in 1918. It is found from south-eastern Brazil south to Uruguay, Paraguay and north-eastern Argentina.

The larvae feed on Solanum species.
