= Chetone kenara =

Scientific classification
- Domain: Eukaryota
- Kingdom: Animalia
- Phylum: Arthropoda
- Class: Insecta
- Order: Lepidoptera
- Superfamily: Noctuoidea
- Family: Erebidae
- Subfamily: Arctiinae
- Genus: Chetone
- Species: C. kenara

Binomial name
- Chetone kenara (Butler, 1871)

Synonyms
- Pericopis kenara Butler, 1871; Pericopis f. separata Hering, 1925

Species of moth

Chetone kenara is a moth of the family Erebidae. It was described by Arthur Gardiner Butler in 1871. It is found in Colombia, Panama and Venezuela.
