= Phaeochlaena solilucis =

Scientific classification
- Kingdom: Animalia
- Phylum: Arthropoda
- Clade: Pancrustacea
- Class: Insecta
- Order: Lepidoptera
- Superfamily: Noctuoidea
- Family: Notodontidae
- Genus: Phaeochlaena
- Species: P. solilucis

Binomial name
- Phaeochlaena solilucis Butler, 1878

Synonyms
- Campylona aurata Warren, 1905; Campylona contingens Warren, 1904; Phaeochlaena perintrusa Prout, 1918; Erylices subintrusa Warren, 1897

Species of moth

Phaeochlaena solilucis is a moth of the family Notodontidae. It is found in Brazil, Bolivia, Ecuador and Colombia.
