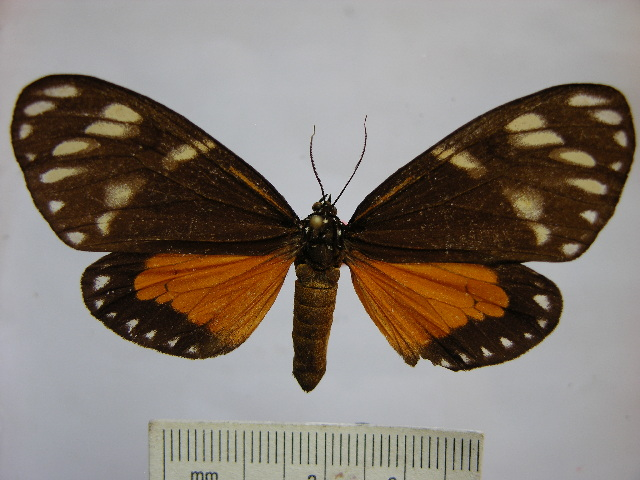

Scientific classification
- Domain: Eukaryota
- Kingdom: Animalia
- Phylum: Arthropoda
- Class: Insecta
- Order: Lepidoptera
- Superfamily: Noctuoidea
- Family: Erebidae
- Subfamily: Arctiinae
- Genus: Chetone
- Species: C. ithomia

Binomial name
- Chetone ithomia Boisduval, 1870

Synonyms
- Anthomyza ithomia; Pericopis ithomia

= Chetone ithomia =

Species of moth

Chetone ithomia is a moth of the family Erebidae. It was described by Jean Baptiste Boisduval in 1870. It is found in Nicaragua and Costa Rica.
