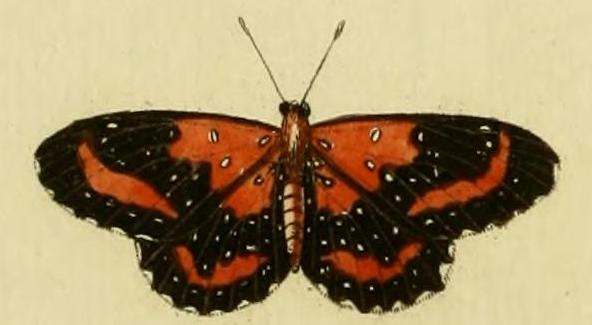

Scientific classification
- Kingdom: Animalia
- Phylum: Arthropoda
- Class: Insecta
- Order: Lepidoptera
- Family: Riodinidae
- Genus: Stalachtis
- Species: S. phlegia

Binomial name
- Stalachtis phlegia (Cramer, [1779])

Synonyms
- Papilio phlegia Cramer, [1779]; Stalachtis phlegia f. irion Seitz, 1917; Stalachtis phlegia coronis Stichel, 1929; Papilio susanna Fabricius, 1787; Mechanitis meriana Eschscholtz, 1821; Stalachtis phlegia susanna ab. pygmaea d'Almeida, 1922

= Stalachtis phlegia =

Species of butterfly

Stalachtis phlegia is a species of butterfly of the family Riodinidae. It is found in South America.

== Subspecies ==
- Stalachtis phlegia phlegia (Surinam)
- Stalachtis phlegia nocticoelum Seitz, 1917 (Brazil: Pará)
- Stalachtis phlegia phlegetontia (Perty, 1833) (Brazil: Goiás and Mato Grosso, Paraguay)
- Stalachtis phlegia susanna (Fabricius, 1787) (Brazil: Rio de Janeiro)
- Stalachtis phlegia venezolana Seitz, 1917 (Venezuela)
