= Phaeochlaena =

Scientific classification
- Kingdom: Animalia
- Phylum: Arthropoda
- Clade: Pancrustacea
- Class: Insecta
- Order: Lepidoptera
- Superfamily: Noctuoidea
- Family: Notodontidae
- Tribe: Dioptini
- Genus: Phaeochlaena; Hubner, 1818

Genus of moths

Phaeochlaena is a genus of moths of the family Notodontidae. It consists of the following species:

- Phaeochlaena amazonica Druce, 1899
- Phaeochlaena bicolor (Möschler, 1877)
- Phaeochlaena costaricensis Miller, 2008
- Phaeochlaena gyon (Fabricius, 1787)
- Phaeochlaena hazara (Butler, 1871)
- Phaeochlaena lampra Prout, 1918
- Phaeochlaena solilucis Butler, 1878
