= Chetone phyleis =

Scientific classification
- Domain: Eukaryota
- Kingdom: Animalia
- Phylum: Arthropoda
- Class: Insecta
- Order: Lepidoptera
- Superfamily: Noctuoidea
- Family: Erebidae
- Subfamily: Arctiinae
- Genus: Chetone
- Species: C. phyleis

Binomial name
- Chetone phyleis (H. Druce, 1885)

Synonyms
- Pericopis phyleis H. Druce, 1885

Species of moth

Chetone phyleis is a moth of the family Erebidae. It was described by Herbert Druce in 1885. It is found in Ecuador and Peru.
