= Chetone meta =

Scientific classification
- Domain: Eukaryota
- Kingdom: Animalia
- Phylum: Arthropoda
- Class: Insecta
- Order: Lepidoptera
- Superfamily: Noctuoidea
- Family: Erebidae
- Subfamily: Arctiinae
- Genus: Chetone
- Species: C. meta

Binomial name
- Chetone meta (H. Druce, 1895)

Synonyms
- Pericopis meta H. Druce, 1895

Species of moth

Chetone meta is a moth of the family Erebidae. It was described by Herbert Druce in 1895. It is found in Colombia.
