= Chetone decisa =

Scientific classification
- Kingdom: Animalia
- Phylum: Arthropoda
- Class: Insecta
- Order: Lepidoptera
- Superfamily: Noctuoidea
- Family: Erebidae
- Subfamily: Arctiinae
- Genus: Chetone
- Species: C. decisa

Binomial name
- Chetone decisa (Walker, 1854)

Synonyms
- Pericopis decisa Walker, 1854

Species of moth

Chetone decisa is a moth of the family Erebidae. It was described by Francis Walker in 1854. It is found in Colombia.
