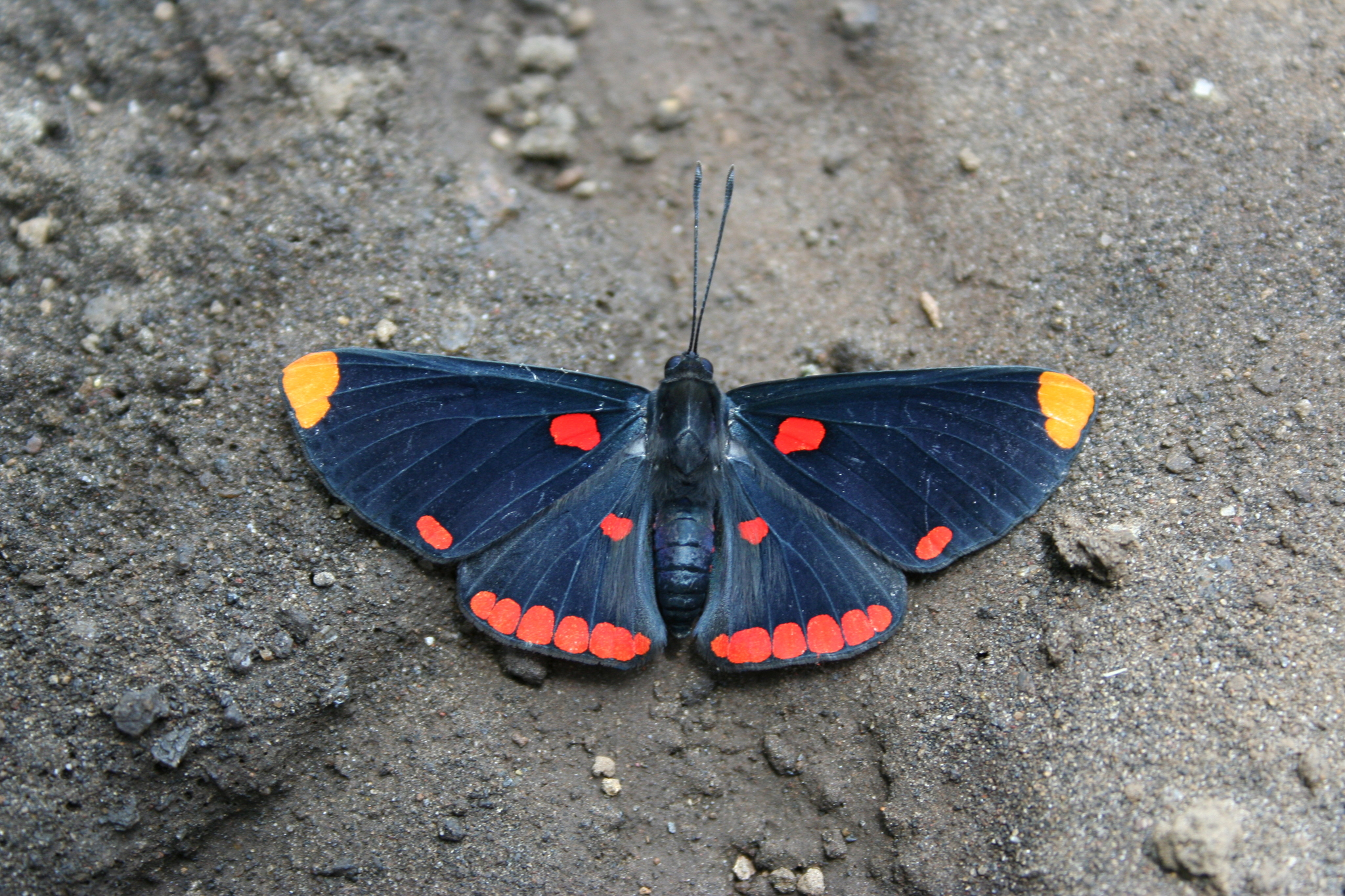
- Melanis pixe, El Salvador

Scientific classification
- Kingdom: Animalia
- Phylum: Arthropoda
- Class: Insecta
- Order: Lepidoptera
- Family: Riodinidae
- Genus: Melanis
- Species: M. pixe

Binomial name
- Melanis pixe (Boisduval, 1836)

Synonyms
- Limnas pixe Boisduval, [1836]; Lymnas pixe sanguinea Stichel, 1910; Lymnas crenitaenia Stichel, 1910; Lymnas crenitaenia f. signata Stichel, 1910; Lymnas pixe corvina Stichel, 1910

= Melanis pixe =

Species of butterfly

Melanis pixe, the red-bordered pixie, is a species in the butterfly family Riodinidae. It was described by Jean Baptiste Boisduval in 1836.

== Description ==
Melanis pixe has a wingspan of about 40 millimetres (1.6 in). The upperside of the wings is black. The tip of forewing is yellow orange and the base has a red spot. The hindwing outer margin has a band of red spots. Eggs are laid in groups of 10 to 30 on the host tree leaves, stems, or bark and the caterpillars feed on the leaves.

== Distribution and habitat ==
This species is found in the Lower Rio Grande Valley of South Texas south to Costa Rica.

== Biology ==
The larvae feed on Albizia caribea, Inga species and Pithecellobium species (including Pithecellobium dulce).

== Subspecies ==
Melanis pixe pixe Mexico Melanis pixe sanguinea (Stichel, 1910) Costa Rica - Panama
