= Stalachtis halloweeni =

Scientific classification
- Kingdom: Animalia
- Phylum: Arthropoda
- Class: Insecta
- Order: Lepidoptera
- Family: Riodinidae
- Genus: Stalachtis
- Species: S. halloweeni

Binomial name
- Stalachtis halloweeni Hall, 2006

Species of butterfly

Stalachtis halloweeni is a species of butterfly of the family Riodinidae. It is found in Guyana.
