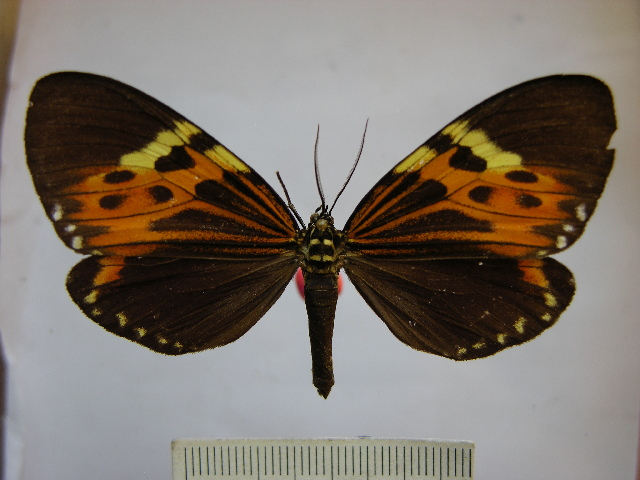

Scientific classification
- Domain: Eukaryota
- Kingdom: Animalia
- Phylum: Arthropoda
- Class: Insecta
- Order: Lepidoptera
- Superfamily: Noctuoidea
- Family: Erebidae
- Subfamily: Arctiinae
- Genus: Chetone
- Species: C. hydra

Binomial name
- Chetone hydra (Butler, 1871)

Synonyms
- Pericopis hydra Butler, 1871

= Chetone hydra =

Species of moth

Chetone hydra is a moth of the family Erebidae. It was described by Arthur Gardiner Butler in 1871. It is found in Ecuador and Peru.
