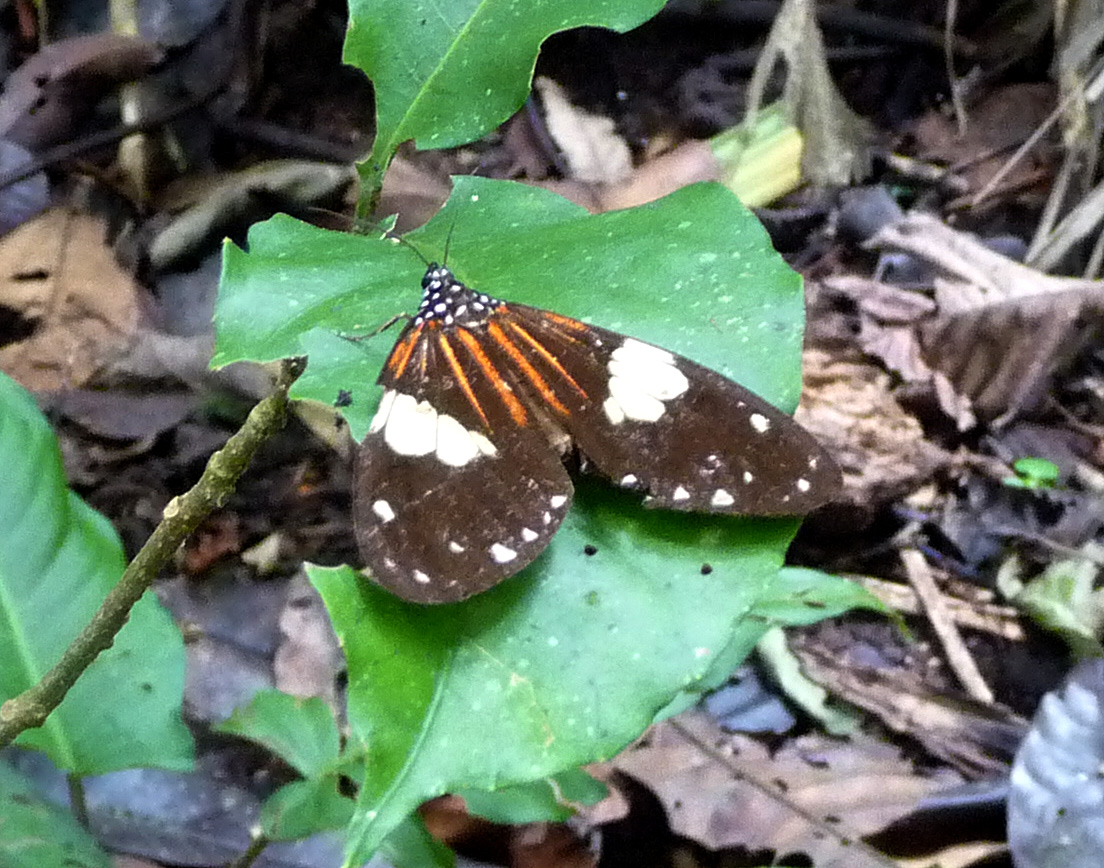

Scientific classification
- Domain: Eukaryota
- Kingdom: Animalia
- Phylum: Arthropoda
- Class: Insecta
- Order: Lepidoptera
- Superfamily: Noctuoidea
- Family: Erebidae
- Subfamily: Arctiinae
- Genus: Chetone
- Species: C. ithrana

Binomial name
- Chetone ithrana (Butler, 1871)

Synonyms
- Pericopis ithrana Butler, 1871; Pericopis intersecta Hering, 1925

= Chetone ithrana =

Species of moth

Chetone ithrana is a moth of the family Erebidae. It was described by Arthur Gardiner Butler in 1871. It is found in Brazil and Peru.

== Subspecies ==
- Chetone ithrana ithrana (Brazil)
- Chetone ithrana intersecta (Hering, 1925) (Peru)
