= Chetone mimica =

Scientific classification
- Domain: Eukaryota
- Kingdom: Animalia
- Phylum: Arthropoda
- Class: Insecta
- Order: Lepidoptera
- Superfamily: Noctuoidea
- Family: Erebidae
- Subfamily: Arctiinae
- Genus: Chetone
- Species: C. mimica

Binomial name
- Chetone mimica (Butler, 1871)

Synonyms
- Anthomyza mimica Butler, 1871

Species of moth

Chetone mimica is a moth of the family Erebidae. It was described by Arthur Gardiner Butler in 1874. It is found in Colombia and Venezuela.
