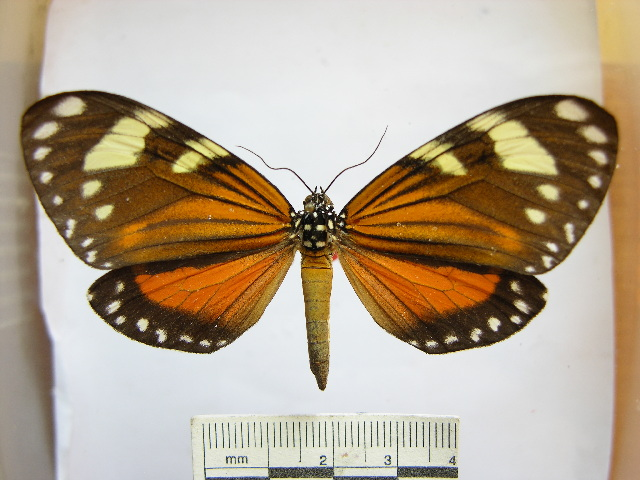

Scientific classification
- Kingdom: Animalia
- Phylum: Arthropoda
- Class: Insecta
- Order: Lepidoptera
- Superfamily: Noctuoidea
- Family: Erebidae
- Subfamily: Arctiinae
- Genus: Chetone
- Species: C. salvini

Binomial name
- Chetone salvini Boisduval, 1870

Synonyms
- Anthomyza salvini; Pericopis salvini

= Chetone salvini =

Species of moth

Chetone salvini is a moth of the family Erebidae. It was described by Jean Baptiste Boisduval in 1870. It is found in Central America.
