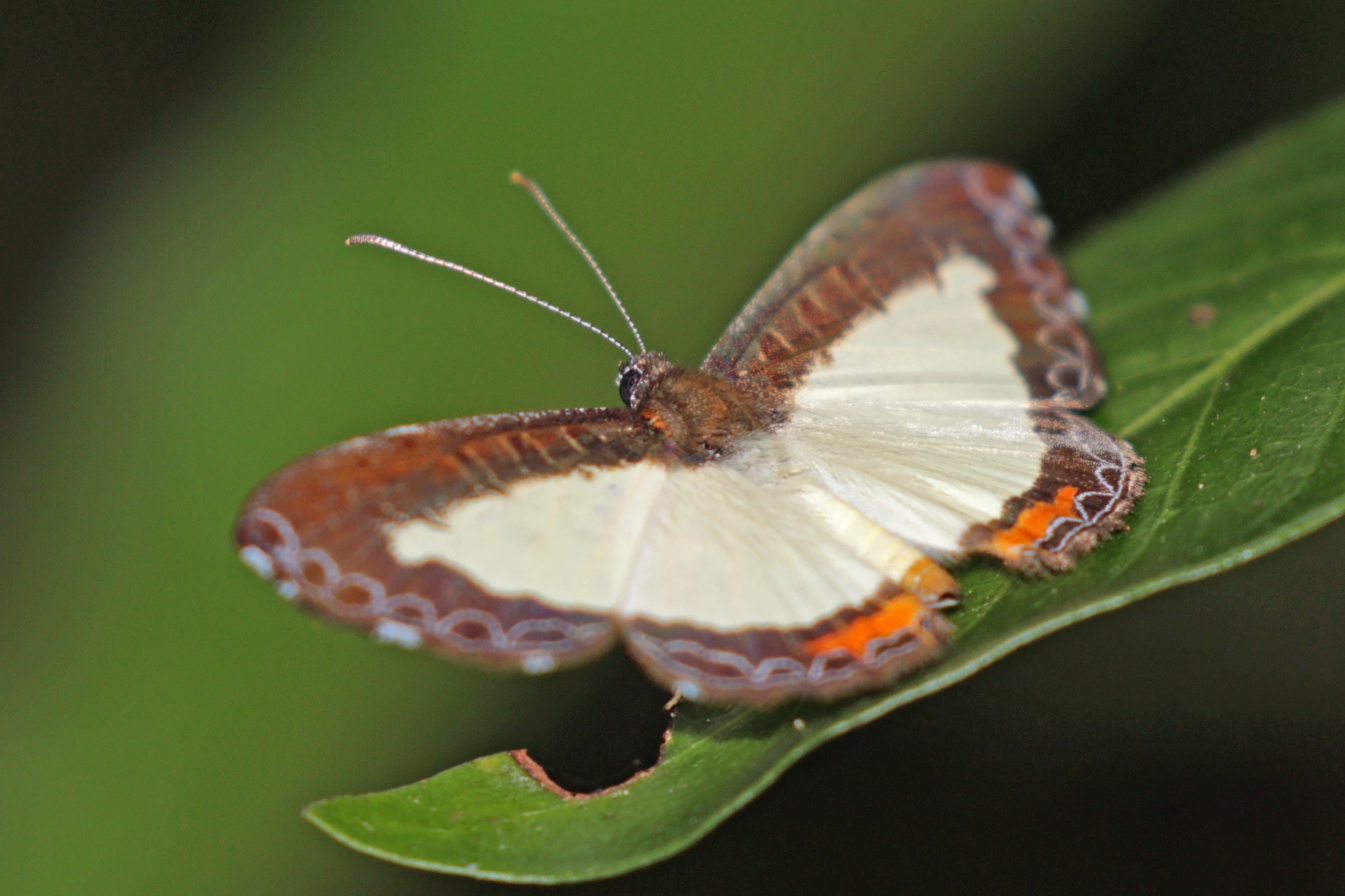
- N. azanoides occidentalis Panama

Scientific classification
- Kingdom: Animalia
- Phylum: Arthropoda
- Class: Insecta
- Order: Lepidoptera
- Family: Riodinidae
- Tribe: Nymphidiini
- Genus: Nymphidium; Fabricius, 1807

Synonyms
- Nymphopsis Reuter, 1896; Tyanitis Westwood, 1851; Desmozona Boisduval, 1836; Heliochlaena Hübner, 1821; Peplia Hübner, 1819; Limnas Hübner, 1806; Mycastor Callaghan, 1983

= Nymphidium =

Genus of butterflies

Nymphidium is a genus in the butterfly family Riodinidae present only in the Neotropical realm.

Some Nymphidium are obviously secondarily transformed by mimicry, otherwise the almost exclusive colours are brown and white either of which being now and then preponderant. The wings have a normal shape without indentations, tail appendages, lobing or coiling. The larva is shaped like a woodlouse, hunched, green, sometimes with a yellow lateral streak, the neck organ out of a transverse row of green spikes or bristles. It has a guard of ants. The pupa is green, fastened by a belt-like thread. The butterflies rest on the under surface of leaves and are chased up by beating the bushes, whereupon they fly like Geometridae for some paces, in order to hide themselves again. The swarming-time seems to be dawn, or the early morning, but the author came across them yet in the sunshine of the morning on blossoms. They are easily taken and fly low.

== Species ==
- Nymphidium acherois (Boisduval, 1836) present in French Guiana, Brazil
- Nymphidium ariari Callaghan, 1988 present in Colombia
- Nymphidium ascolia Hewitson, [1853] present in Guatemala, Bolivia, Brazil
- Nymphidium aurum Callaghan, 1985 present in Brazil
- Nymphidium azanoides Butler, 1867 present in Costa Rica, Ecuador, Brazil
- Nymphidium baeotia Hewitson, [1853] present in French Guiana, Guyana, Brazil
- Nymphidium balbinus Staudinger, [1887] present in Colombia
- Nymphidium cachrus (Fabricius, 1787) present in French Guiana, Guyana, Trinidad and Tobago, Colombia
- Nymphidium callaghani Brévignon, 1999 present in French Guiana
- Nymphidium caricae (Linnaeus, 1758) present in French Guiana, Guyana, Suriname, Colombia, Ecuador, Peru, Venezuela, Brazil
- Nymphidium carmentis Stichel, 1910 present in Ecuador, Bolivia
- Nymphidium chimborazium Bates, 1868 present in Ecuador
- Nymphidium chione Bates, 1867 present in Brazil
- Nymphidium colleti Gallard, 2008
- Nymphidium derufata Callaghan, 1985 present in Suriname
- Nymphidium fulminans Bates, 1868 present in Colombia, Brazil
- Nymphidium guyanensis Gallard & Brévignon, 1989 present in French Guiana
- Nymphidium haematostictum Godman & Salvin, 1878 present in Costa Rica, Panama
- Nymphidium hermieri Gallard, 2008
- Nymphidium hesperinum Stichel, 1911 present in Peru
- Nymphidium latibrunis Callaghan, 1985 present in Ecuador
- Nymphidium lenocinium Schaus, 1913 present in Costa Rica, Colombia
- Nymphidium leucosia (Hübner, [1806]) present in Colombia, Peru, Brazil
- Nymphidium lisimon (Stoll, 1790) present in French Guiana, Guyana, Suriname, Peru, Brazil
- Nymphidium manicorensis Callaghan, 1985 present in French Guiana, Brazil
- Nymphidium mantus (Cramer, 1775) present in French Guiana, Guyana, Suriname, Costa Rica, Venezuela, Trinidad and Tobago, Brazil
- Nymphidium menalcus (Stoll, 1782) present in French Guiana, Suriname, Venezuela
- Nymphidium ninias Hewitson, 1865 present in Brazil
- Nymphidium nivea Talbot, 1928 present in Brazil
- Nymphidium olinda Bates, 1865 present in Panama, Venezuela, Brazil
- Nymphidium omois Hewitson, 1865 present in Amazon basin
- Nymphidium onaeum Hewitson, 1869 present in Honduras, Panama
- Nymphidium plinthobaphis Stichel, 1910 present in Brazil, Peru
- Nymphidium smalli Callaghan, 1999 present in Panama
- Nymphidium strati Kaye, 1925 present in Trinidad and Tobago
- Nymphidium trinidadi Callaghan, 1999 present in Trinidad and Tobago
- Nymphidium undimargo Seitz, 1917 present in Brazil

=== Sources ===
- Nymphidium on Markku Savela's website on Lepidoptera

=== External links ===
- Nymphidium at Butterflies of America
