= Pandemos pasiphae =

Scientific classification
- Domain: Eukaryota
- Kingdom: Animalia
- Phylum: Arthropoda
- Class: Insecta
- Order: Lepidoptera
- Family: Riodinidae
- Tribe: Nymphidiini
- Subtribe: Nymphidiina
- Genus: Pandemos; Hübner, 1819
- Species: P. pasiphae

Binomial name
- Pandemos pasiphae Cramer, 1775

Species of butterfly

Pandemos is a monotypic genus of butterflies in the family Riodinidae. Its sole species, Pandemos pasiphae, is found in South America.
