= Chetone zuleika =

Scientific classification
- Domain: Eukaryota
- Kingdom: Animalia
- Phylum: Arthropoda
- Class: Insecta
- Order: Lepidoptera
- Superfamily: Noctuoidea
- Family: Erebidae
- Subfamily: Arctiinae
- Genus: Chetone
- Species: C. zuleika

Binomial name
- Chetone zuleika Becker & Goodger, 2013

Species of moth

Chetone zuleika is a moth of the family Erebidae first described by Vitor Osmar Becker and David T. Goodger in 2013. It is found in Panama, Colombia and Brazil.

Adults mimic the butterflies Heliconius hecale zuleika, Tithorea tarricina pinthias, Eueides procula vulgiformis and Papilio ascolius zalates.
