= Joiceya =

Conservation status
- Endangered (IUCN 2.3)

Scientific classification
- Kingdom: Animalia
- Phylum: Arthropoda
- Clade: Pancrustacea
- Class: Insecta
- Order: Lepidoptera
- Family: Riodinidae
- Subfamily: Riodininae
- Tribe: Nymphidiini
- Genus: Joiceya
- Species: J. praeclarus

Binomial name
- Joiceya praeclarus Talbot, 1928

Species of butterfly

Joiceya praeclarus is a species of butterfly in the family Riodinidae. It is monotypic within the genus Joiceya. It is endemic to Brazil.

This species is sometimes referred to as Joiceya praeclara.
