= Stalachtis magdalena =

Scientific classification
- Domain: Eukaryota
- Kingdom: Animalia
- Phylum: Arthropoda
- Class: Insecta
- Order: Lepidoptera
- Family: Riodinidae
- Genus: Stalachtis
- Species: S. magdalena

Binomial name
- Stalachtis magdalena (Westwood, [1851])

Synonyms
- Stalactis magdalena Westwood, [1851]; Stalachtis magdalenae Doubleday, 1847

Species of butterfly

Stalachtis magdalena is a species of butterfly of the family Riodinidae. It was described by John O. Westwood in 1851, and is known from Colombia.

== Subspecies ==
- Stalachtis magdalena magdalena (Colombia)
- Stalachtis magdalena cleove Staudinger, 1888 (Colombia)
