= Chetone variifasciata =

Scientific classification
- Domain: Eukaryota
- Kingdom: Animalia
- Phylum: Arthropoda
- Class: Insecta
- Order: Lepidoptera
- Superfamily: Noctuoidea
- Family: Erebidae
- Subfamily: Arctiinae
- Genus: Chetone
- Species: C. variifasciata

Binomial name
- Chetone variifasciata (Hering, 1930)

Synonyms
- Pericopis variifasciata Hering, 1930

Species of moth

Chetone variifasciata is a moth of the family Erebidae. It was described by Erich Martin Hering in 1930. It is found in Colombia.
