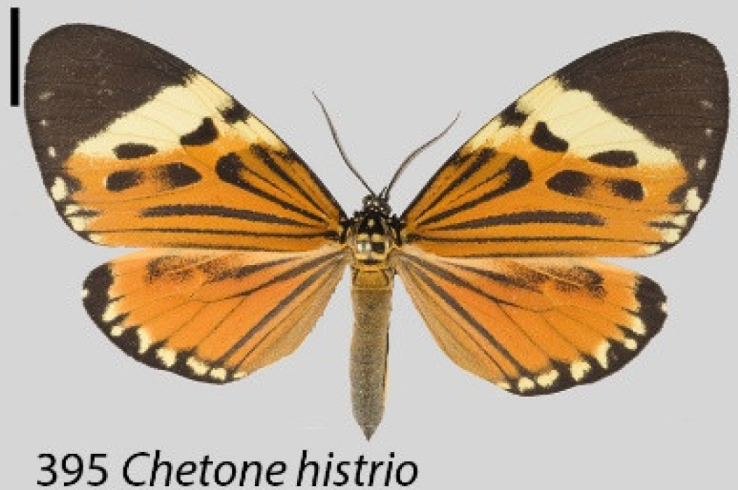

Scientific classification
- Domain: Eukaryota
- Kingdom: Animalia
- Phylum: Arthropoda
- Class: Insecta
- Order: Lepidoptera
- Superfamily: Noctuoidea
- Family: Erebidae
- Subfamily: Arctiinae
- Genus: Chetone
- Species: C. histrio

Binomial name
- Chetone histrio Boisduval, 1870

Synonyms
- Anthomyza histrio; Pericopis f. eugenia Druce, 1897

= Chetone histrio =

Boisduval's tiger

Species of moth

Chetone histrio, or Boisduval's tiger, is a moth of the family Erebidae. It was described by Jean Baptiste Boisduval in 1870. It is found in Honduras, Guatemala and Peru.

== Subspecies ==
- Chetone histrio histrio
- Chetone histrio histrionica Lamas & Grados, 1996
