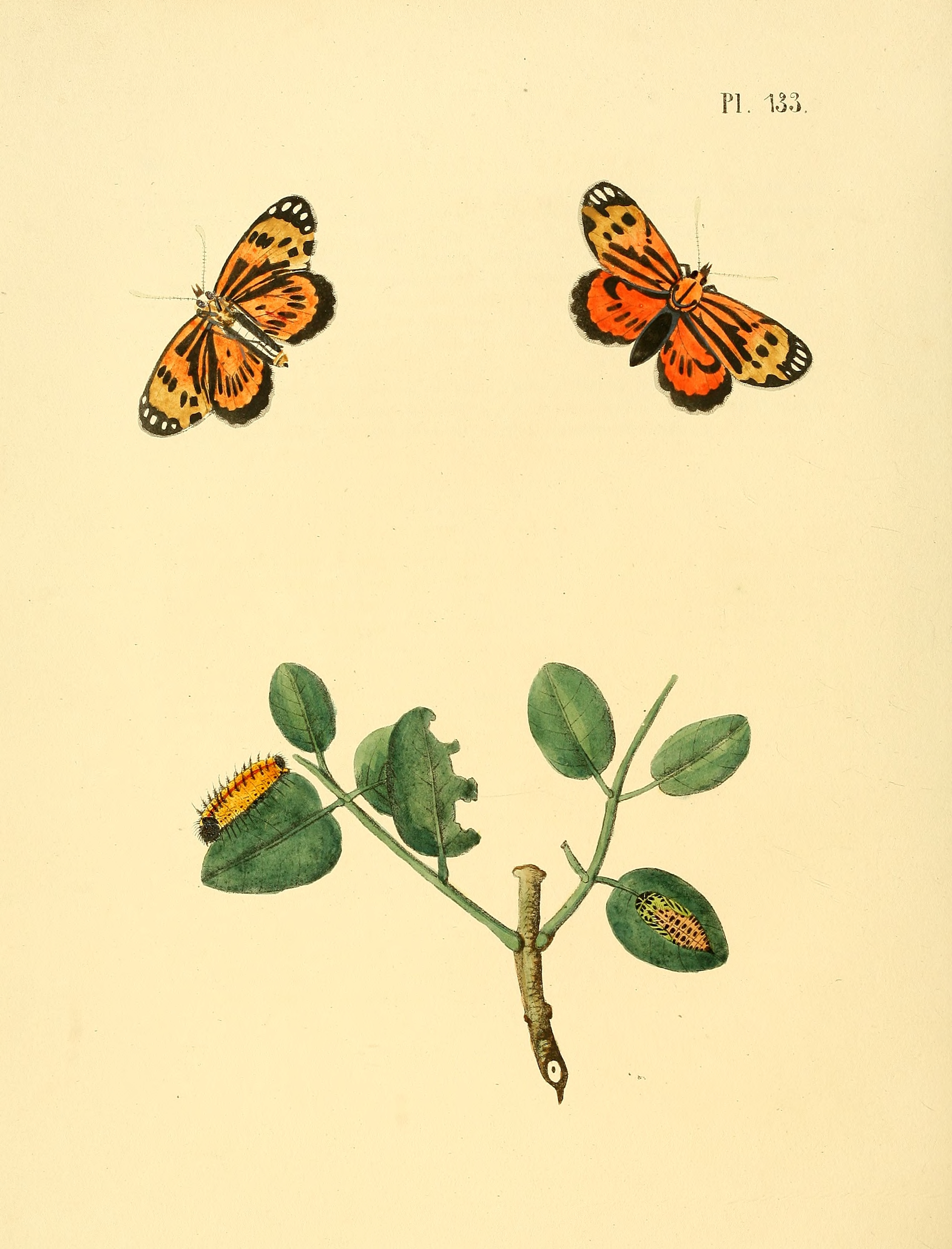

Scientific classification
- Kingdom: Animalia
- Phylum: Arthropoda
- Class: Insecta
- Order: Lepidoptera
- Family: Riodinidae
- Genus: Stalachtis
- Species: S. calliope

Binomial name
- Stalachtis calliope (Linnaeus, 1758)

Synonyms
- Papilio calliope Linnaeus, 1758; Papilio eugenia Cramer, 1777; Stalachtis calliope f. crocota Stichel, 1911; Stalachtis calliope f. terpsichore Seitz, 1917; Stalachtis calliope f. melini Bryk, 1953; Stalachtis calliope f. picturata Stichel, 1914

= Stalachtis calliope =

Species of butterfly

Stalachtis calliope is a species of butterfly of the family Riodinidae. It is found in the South America.

== Subspecies ==
- Stalachtis calliope calliope (Surinam, French Guiana, Brazil: Amazonas)
- Stalachtis calliope bicoler Staudinger, [1887] (Peru)
- Stalachtis calliope voltumna Stichel, 1911 (Ecuador)
