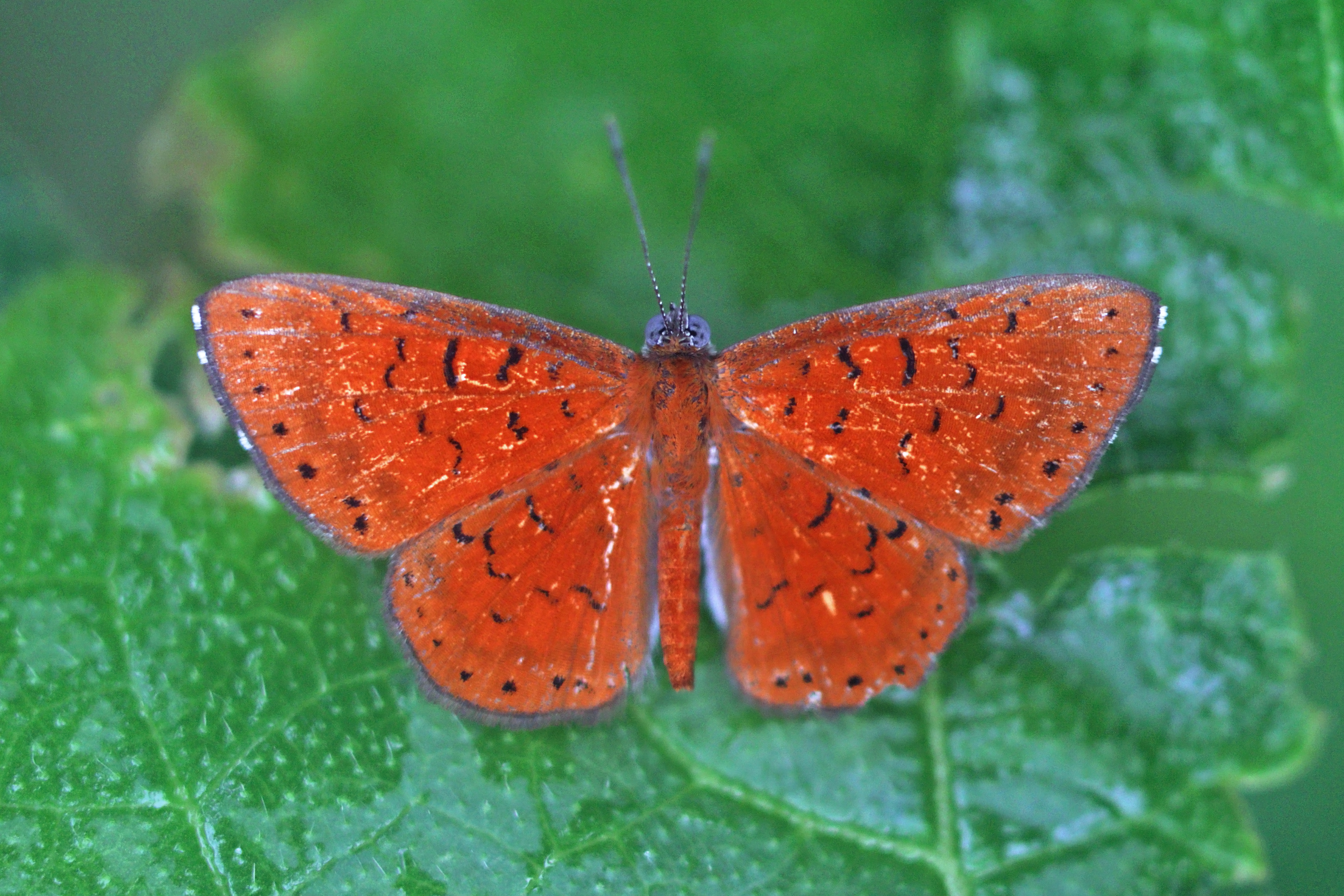
- Lucianus Metalmark (C. lucianus), Panama

Scientific classification
- Kingdom: Animalia
- Phylum: Arthropoda
- Class: Insecta
- Order: Lepidoptera
- Family: Riodinidae
- Subfamily: Riodininae
- Genus: Calospila; Geyer, 1832

Species
- See text

Synonyms
- Calliona Bates, 1868

= Calospila =

Genus of butterflies

Calospila is a butterfly genus in the family Riodinidae. They are resident in the Americas.

== Species list ==
- Calospila antonii Brévignon, 1995 French Guiana
- Calospila apotheta (Bates, 1868) French Guiana, Guyana, Suriname, Colombia, Brazil
- Calospila asteria (Stichel, 1911) Costa Rica, Colombia
- Calospila byzeres (Hewitson, 1872) Brazil
- Calospila candace (Druce, 1904) Brazil
- Calospila cerealis (Hewitson, [1863]) Brazil
- Calospila cilissa (Hewitson, [1863]) Nicaragua, Honduras, Colombia
- Calospila cuprea (Butler, 1867) Brazil
- Calospila emylius (Cramer, 1775) French Guiana, Guyana, Suriname, Trinidad and Tobago, Bolivia, Brazil, Peru
- Calospila fannia (Godman, 1903) Guyana
- Calospila gallardi Brévignon, 1995 French Guiana
- Calospila gyges (Stichel, 1911) French Guiana, Peru
- Calospila hemileuca (Bates, 1868) Panama, Costa Rica, Colombia, Ecuador, Brazil
- Calospila idmon (Godman & Salvin, 1889) Panama
- Calospila irene (Westwood, 1851) Brazil
- Calospila latona (Hewitson, 1853) Venezuela, Brazil
- Calospila lucetia (Hübner, 1821) Brazil
- Calospila lucianus (Fabricius, 1793) Venezuela, Costa Rica, Panama, Trinidad and Tobago, Suriname, Colombia
- Calospila maeon (Godman, 1903) Colombia
- Calospila maeonoides (Godman, 1903) Guyana
- Calospila martialis (C. & R. Felder, 1865) Suriname
- Calospila parthaon (Dalman, 1823) Brazil
- Calospila pelarge (Godman & Salvin, 1878) Mexico, Panama, Guatemala
- Calospila pirene (Godman, 1903) Peru
- Calospila rhesa (Hewitson, [1858]) Brazil
- Calospila rhodope (Hewitson, 1853) French Guiana, Guyana, Suriname, Trinidad and Tobago, Brazil, Ecuador, Peru
- Calospila satyroides (Lathy, 1932) Guyana
- Calospila siaka (Hewitson, [1858]) Brazil
- Calospila simplaris (Stichel, 1911) Brazil
- Calospila thara (Hewitson, [1858]) French Guiana, Guyana, Suriname, Brazil, Ecuador, Peru
- Calospila urichi (May, 1972) Trinidad and Tobago
- Calospila zeanger (Stoll, [1790]) French Guiana, Guyana, Suriname, Trinidad and Tobago

=== Sources ===
- Calospila
