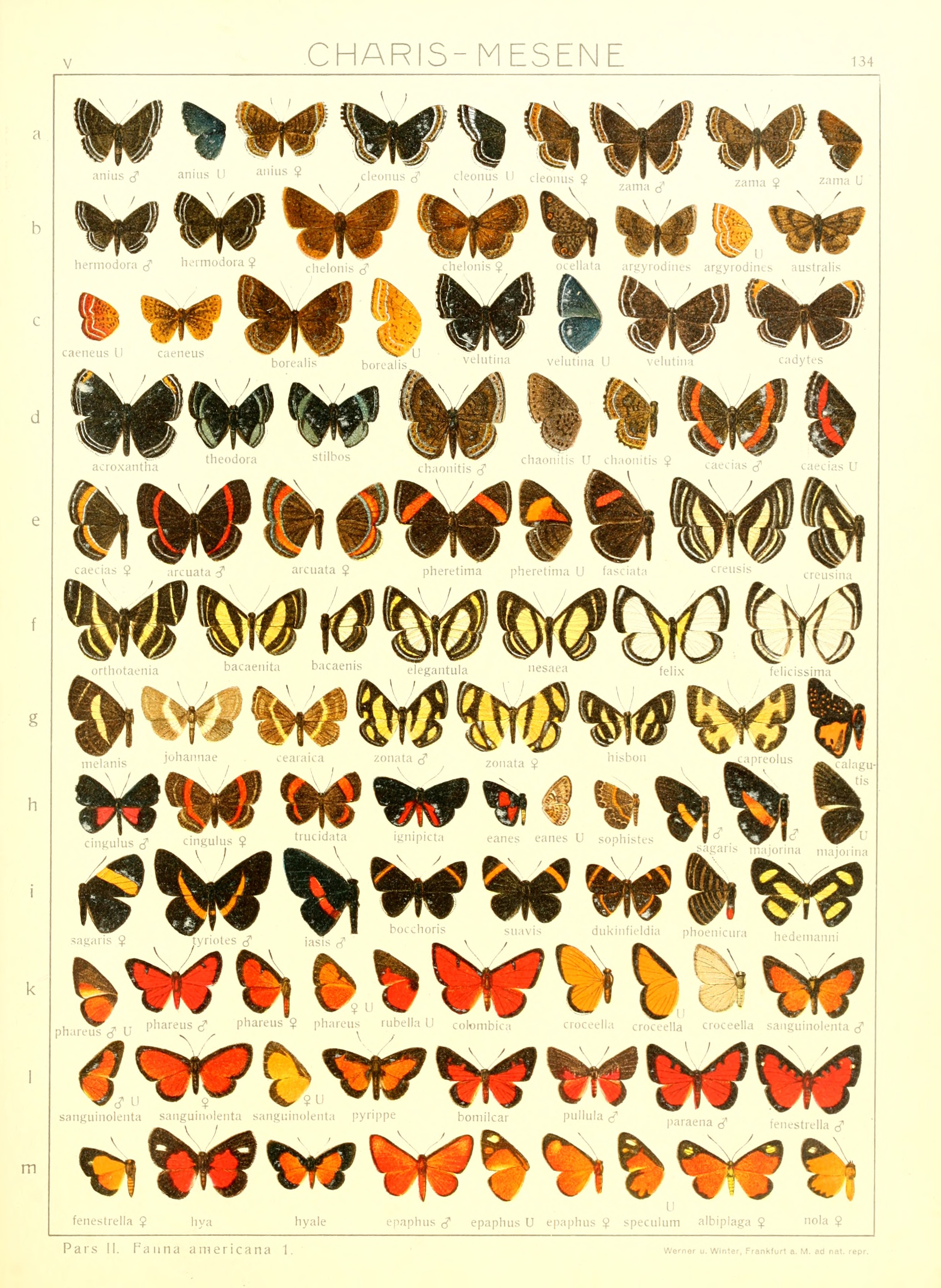
- Mesene (pharaeus et seq.) and related species

Scientific classification
- Kingdom: Animalia
- Phylum: Arthropoda
- Class: Insecta
- Order: Lepidoptera
- Family: Riodinidae
- Subfamily: Riodininae
- Genus: Mesene; Doubleday, 1847

Synonyms
- Emesis [Illiger], 1807 (suppressed); Agathina White, 1843 (preoccupied Férussac, 1807)

= Mesene (butterfly) =

Genus of butterflies

Mesene is a genus in the butterfly family Riodinidae present in the Neotropical realm.

Riodinidae Mesene exhibit many color variations and combinations and vary by geographic region. The males have triangular, pointed, brightly coloured forewings and small ellipsoidal hindwings. In the wing veins the species exhibit great conformity, the second subcostal vein, the upper median vein in the forewing as well as in the hindwing rise before the cell-end. They rest well hidden on the under surface of leaves but fly when disturbed somewhat like geometrids for about 10 to 20 metres always keeping in the middle of the forest roads, in order to drop again into another bush. The larvae are lycaenid like, somewhat like woodlice, fluffily haired; that of M. phareus lives on the extremely poisonous Paullinia pinnata to the leaf of which also the small greenish-yellow pupa is spun.

== Species ==
- Mesene babosa Hall & Willmott, 1995 present in Ecuador
- Mesene bomilcar (Stoll, 1790) present in French Guiana, Guyana, Suriname
- Mesene celetes Bates, 1868 present in Venezuela and Brazil
- Mesene citrinella Hall & Willmott, 1995 present in Ecuador, Colombia and Brazil
- Mesene croceella Bates, 1865 present in Mexico and Costa Rica
- Mesene cyneas (Hewitson, 1874) present in Brazil, Ecuador and Peru
- Mesene epaphus (Stoll, 1780) present in French Guiana, Guyana, Suriname and Brazil
- Mesene florus (Fabricius, 1793) present in Brazil
- Mesene hyale C. & R. Felder, 1865 present in Colombia
- Mesene ingrumaensis Callaghan & Salazar, 1999 present in Colombia
- Mesene leucophrys Bates, 1868 present in Suriname, Brazil and Peru
- Mesene leucopus Godman & Salvin, [1886] present in Guatemala
- Mesene margaretta (White, 1843) present in Mexico, Colombia, Bolivia and Venezuela
- Mesene monostigma (Erichson, [1849]) present in French Guiana, Guyana, Suriname, Venezuela and Brazil
- Mesene mygdon Schaus, 1913 present in Costa Rica and Panama
- Mesene nepticula Möschler, 1877 present in French Guiana, Guyana, Suriname, Ecuador, Colombia and Brazil
- Mesene nola Herrich-Schäffer, [1853] present in Suriname, Ecuador, Bolivia and Brazil
- Mesene paraena Bates, 1868 present in Brazil
- Mesene patawa Brévignon, 1995 present in French Guiana
- Mesene phareus (Cramer, [1777]) present in Mexico, Colombia, French Guiana, Guyana, Suriname, Brazil and Peru
- Mesene philonis Hewitson, 1874 present in Brazil
- Mesene pyrippe Hewitson, 1874 present in Brazil
- Mesene sardonyx Stichel, 1910 present in Colombia
- Mesene silaris Godman & Salvin, 1878 present in French Guiana, Guyana, Suriname, Ecuador, Venezuela, Guatemala and Peru
- Mesene simplex Bates, 1868 present in Brazil
- Mesene veleda Stichel, 1923 present in Brazil

=== Sources ===
Mesene sur funet
