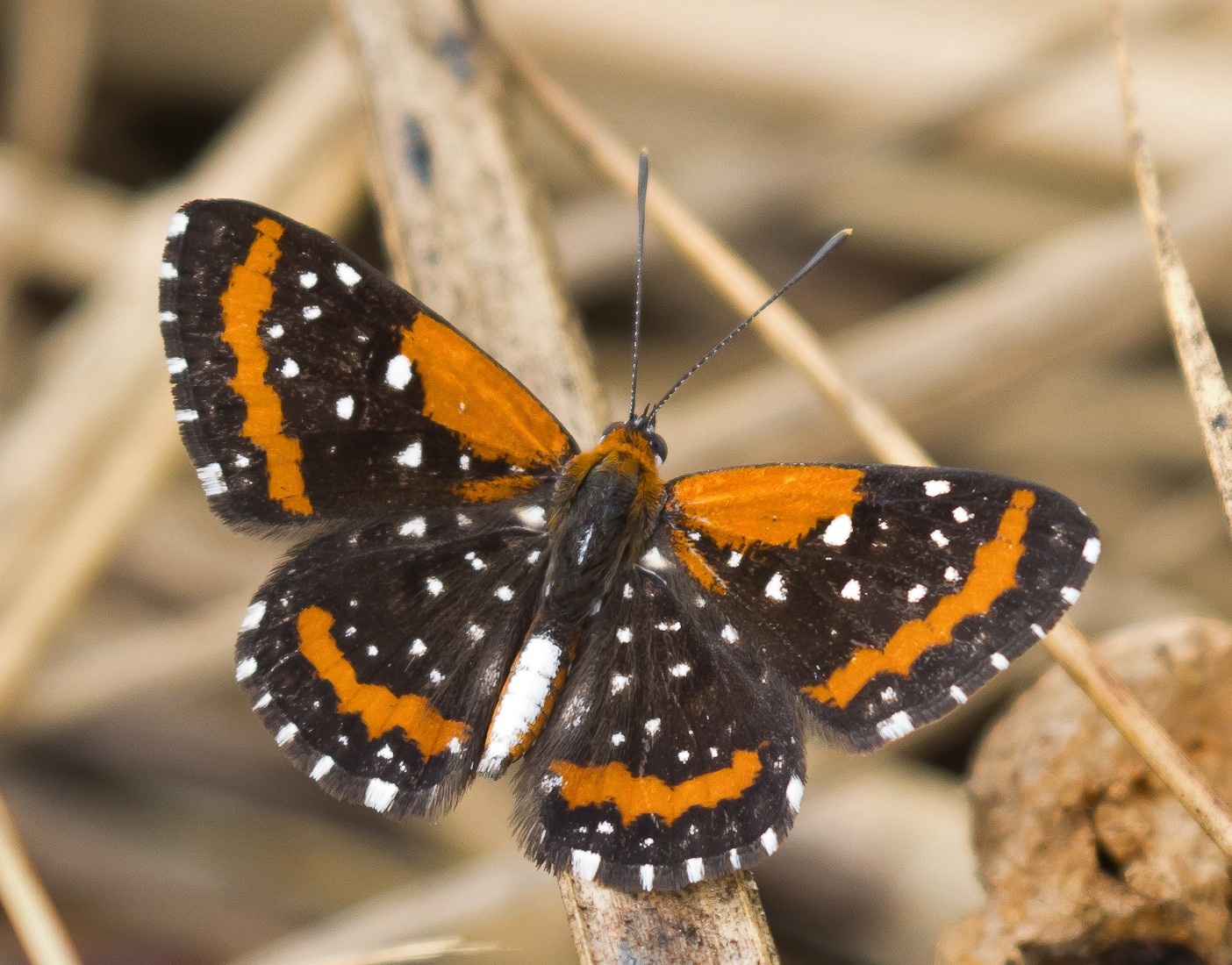
- Lemonias stalachtioides

Scientific classification
- Kingdom: Animalia
- Phylum: Arthropoda
- Clade: Pancrustacea
- Class: Insecta
- Order: Lepidoptera
- Family: Riodinidae
- Genus: Lemonias; Hübner, 1807

= Lemonias =

Genus of butterflies

Lemonias is a genus of butterflies belonging to the family Riodinidae.

The species of this genus are found in the Americas.

Species:

- Lemonias albofasciata (Godman, 1903)
- Lemonias caliginea (A. Butler, 1867)
- Lemonias egaensis (A. Butler, 1867)
- Lemonias ochracea (Mengel, 1902)
- Lemonias sontella (Schaus, 1902)
- Lemonias stalachtioides (A. Butler, 1867)
- Lemonias theodora (Godman, 1903)
- Lemonias zygia Hübner, [1807]
