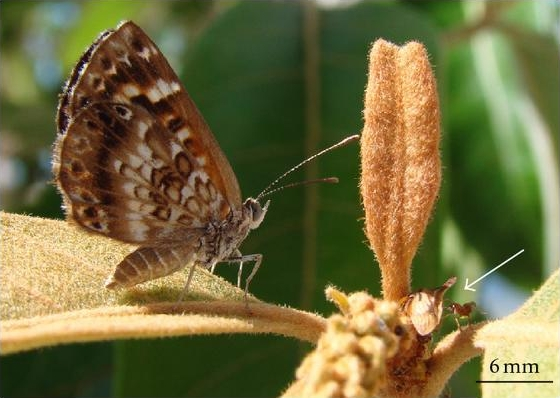
- Aricoris propitia

Scientific classification
- Kingdom: Animalia
- Phylum: Arthropoda
- Class: Insecta
- Order: Lepidoptera
- Family: Riodinidae
- Tribe: Nymphidiini
- Genus: Aricoris; Westwood, [1851]

Synonyms
- Lemonias Hoffmannsegg, 1818; Melanope Röber, [1892]; Audre Hemming, 1934; Eiseleia Miller & Miller, 1972

= Aricoris =

Genus of butterflies

Aricoris is a genus in the butterfly family Riodinidae present in the Neotropical realm.

== Species ==
- Aricoris aurinia (Hewitson, [1863]) present in Uruguay and Brazil
- Aricoris campestris (Bates, 1868) present in Brazil
- Aricoris caracensis (Callaghan, 2001) present in Brazil
- Aricoris chilensis (C. & R. Felder, 1865) present in Bolivia, Uruguay, Chile and Argentina
- Aricoris cinericia (Stichel, 1910) present in Uruguay and Argentina
- Aricoris colchis (C. & R. Felder, 1865) present in Brazil
- Aricoris constantius (Fabricius, 1793) present in Brazil
- Aricoris domina (Bates, 1865) present in Panama and Costa Rica
- Aricoris epulus (Cramer, [1775]) present in Suriname, Argentina and Brazil
- Aricoris erostratus (Westwood, 1851) present in Panama, Colombia and Venezuela
- Aricoris gauchoana (Stichel, 1910) present in Uruguay
- Aricoris hubrichi (Stichel, 1926) present in Uruguay and Argentina
- Aricoris incana (Stichel, 1910) present in Peru and Argentina
- Aricoris indistincta (Lathy, 1932) present in Uruguay and Argentina
- Aricoris middletoni (Sharpe, 1890) present in Brazil
- Aricoris montana (Schneider, 1937) present in Uruguay and Argentina
- Aricoris notialis (Stichel, 1910) present in Argentina
- Aricoris propitia (Stichel, 1910) present in Brazil
- Aricoris signata (Stichel, 1910) present in Brazil
- Aricoris terias Godman, 1903 present in Paraguay and Argentina
- Aricoris zachaeus (Fabricius, 1798) present in French Guiana

=== Sources ===
- funet
- TOL image, implied clade.
