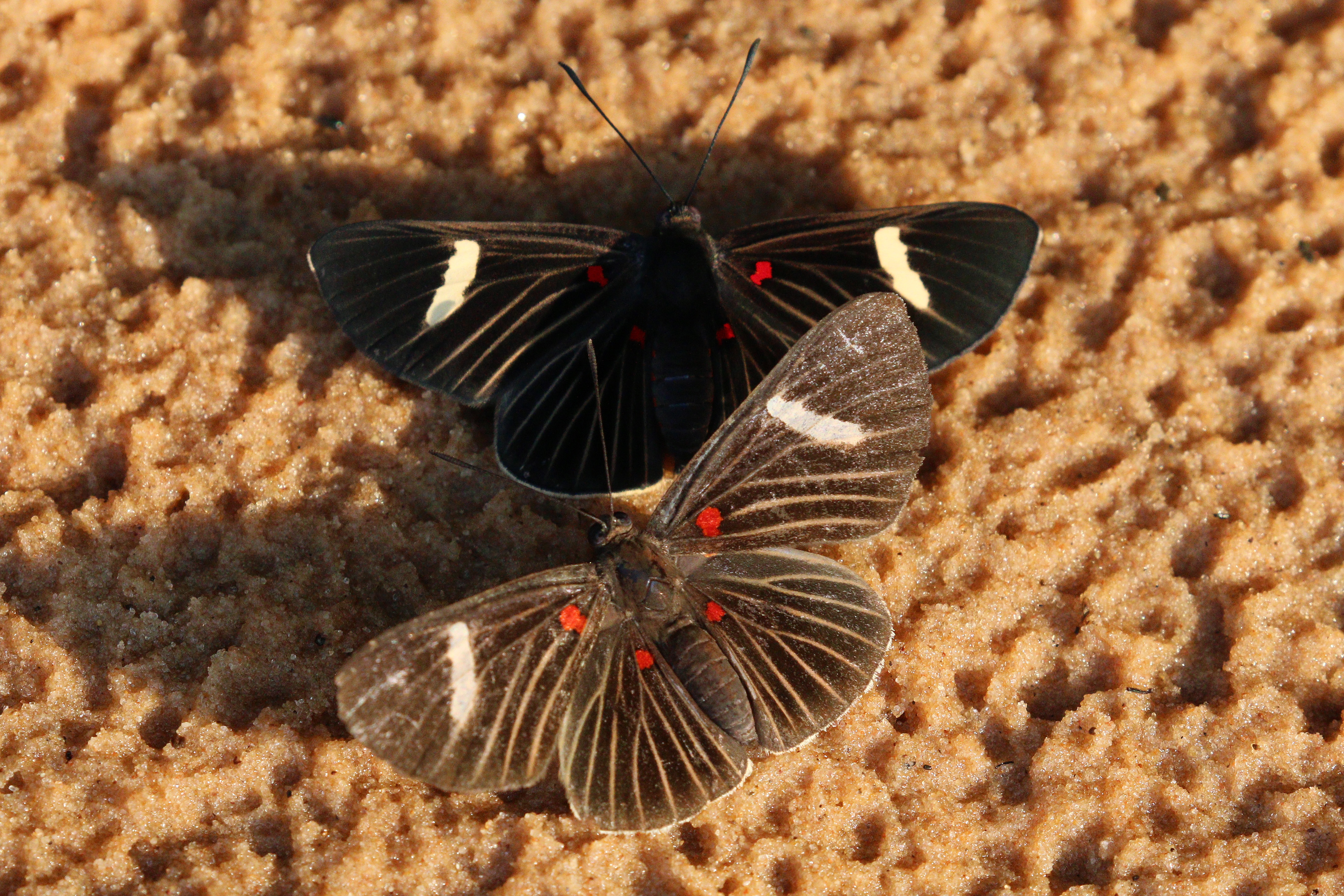
- M. aegates the Pantanal, Brazil
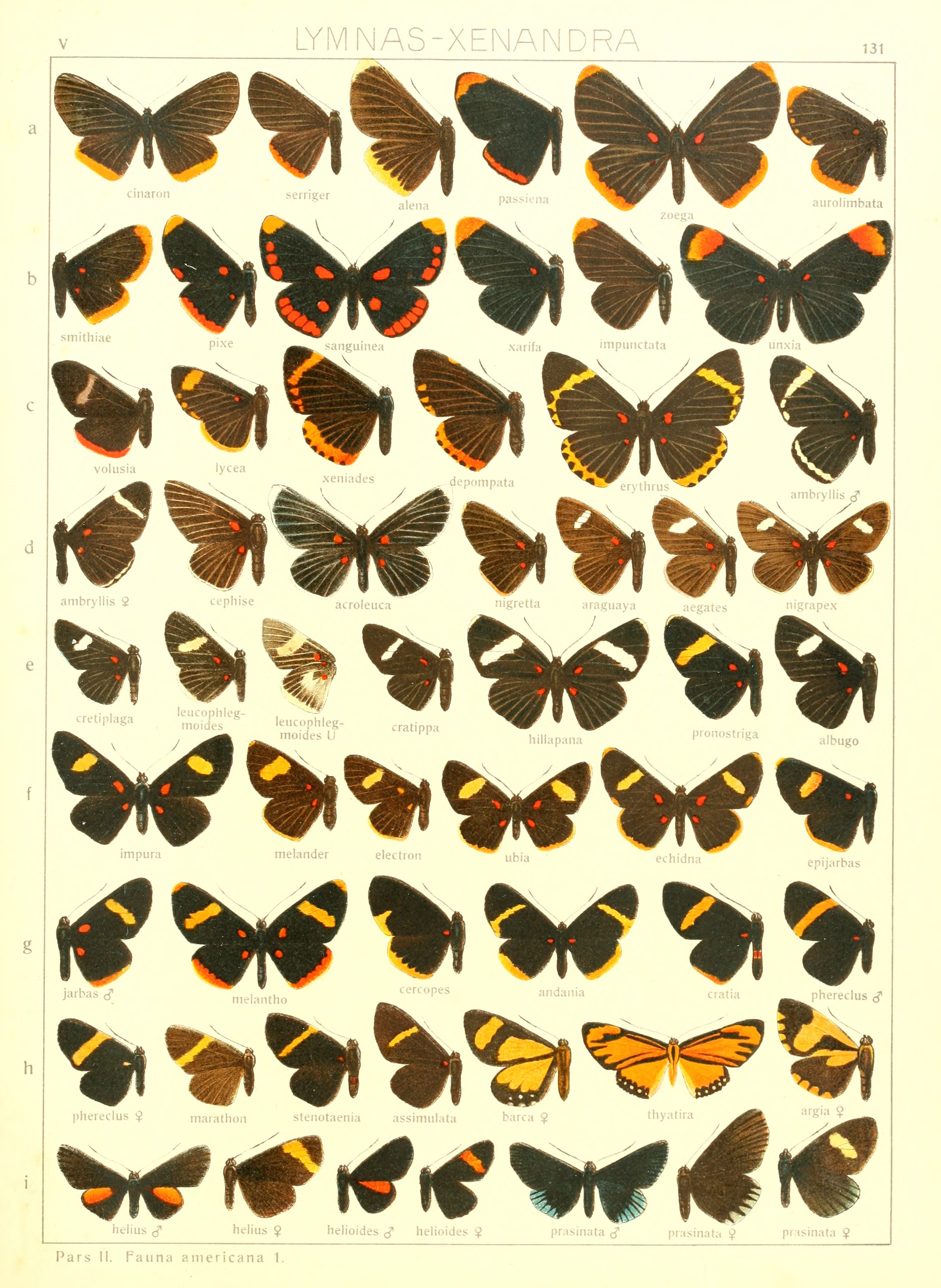
- Melanis plate from Adalbert Seitz's Die Gross-Schmetterlinge der Erde

Scientific classification
- Domain: Eukaryota
- Kingdom: Animalia
- Phylum: Arthropoda
- Class: Insecta
- Order: Lepidoptera
- Family: Riodinidae
- Subfamily: Riodininae
- Genus: Melanis; Hübner, 1819

Synonyms
- Limnas Boisduval, 1836; Lymnas Blanchard, 1840; Oreas C. & R. Felder, [1865]; Dryas C. & R. Felder, [1865]; Rusalkia Kirby, 1871; Aculhua Kirby, 1871

= Melanis =

Genus of butterflies

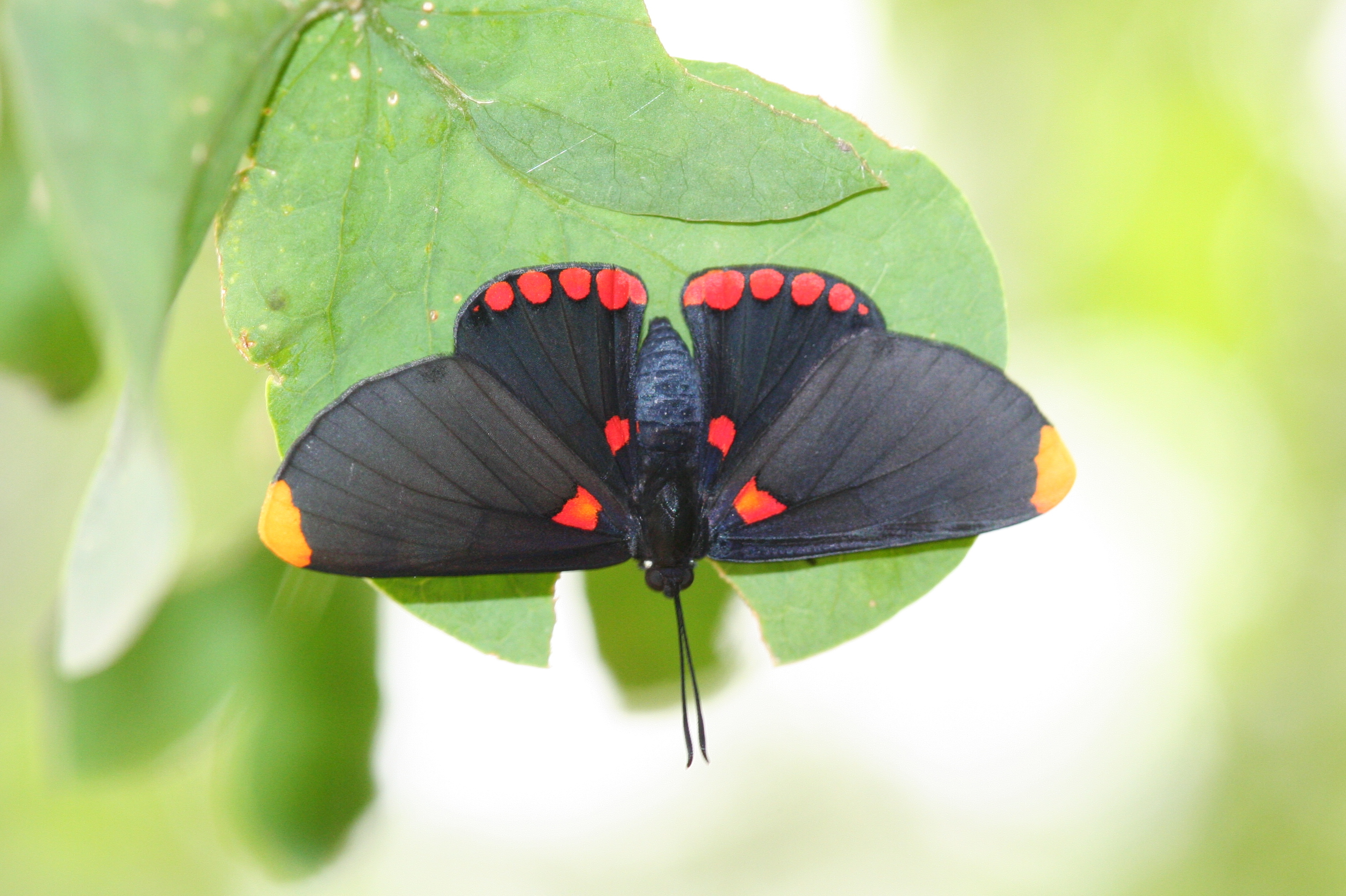
M. pixe (red-bordered pixie)

Melanis is a genus in the butterfly family Riodinidae present in the Neotropical realm.

== Species ==
- Melanis aegates (Hewitson, 1874)
  - M. a. aegates present in Bolivia
  - M. a. albugo (Stichel, 1910) present in Paraguay
  - M. a. araguaya (Seitz, 1913) present in Brazil
  - M. a. cretiplaga (Stichel, 1910) present in Paraguay and Argentina
  - M. a. lilybaeus (Stichel, 1926) present in Brazil
  - M. a. limbata (Stichel, 1925) present in Brazil
  - M. a. melliplaga (Stichel, 1910) present in French Guiana and Suriname
- Melanis alena (Hewitson, 1870) present in Brazil
- Melanis boyi (Stichel, 1923) present in Brazil
- Melanis cephise (Ménétriés, 1855)
  - M. c. cephise present in Nicaragua and Mexico
  - M. c. acroleuca (R. Felder, 1869) present in Mexico
  - M. c. huasteca J. & A. White, 1989 present in Mexico
- Melanis cercopes (Hewitson, 1874) present in Bolivia
- Melanis cinaron (C. & R. Felder, 1861) present in Colombia, Brazil and Peru
- Melanis cratia (Hewitson, 1870)
- Melanis electron (Fabricius, 1793)
  - M. e. electron present in French Guiana, Trinidad and Tobago and Venezuela
  - M. e. auriferax (Stichel, 1910) present in Brazil
  - M. e. epijarbas (Staudinger, 1888) present in Brazil
  - M. e. herellus (Snellen, 1887) present in Curaçao
  - M. e. melantho (Ménétriés, 1855) present in Panama, Guatemala and Nicaragua
  - M. e. pronostriga (Stichel, 1910) present in Colombia and Brazil
  - M. e. rabuscula (Stichel, 1910) present in Brazil and Peru
- Melanis herminae (Zikán, 1952) present in Brazil
- Melanis hillapana (Röber, 1904)
  - M. h. hillapana present in Bolivia and Peru
  - M. h. corinna (Zikán, 1952) present in Brazil
  - M. h. cratippa (Seitz, 1913) present in Brazil
  - M. h. impura (Stichel, 1910)
- Melanis hodia (Butler, 1870) present in Venezuela
- Melanis leucophlegma (Stichel, 1910) present in Peru
- Melanis lioba (Zikán, 1952) present in Brazil
- Melanis lycea Hübner, 1823 present in Brazil
- Melanis marathon (C. & R. Felder, [1865])
  - M. m. marathon present in Venezuela and Colombia
  - M. m. assimulata (Stichel, 1910) present in Colombia
  - M. m. charon (Butler, 1874) present in Brazil
  - M. m. stenotaenia Röber, 1904 present in Peru
- Melanis melandra Hübner, [1819] present in Suriname
- Melanis melaniae (Stichel, 1930) present in Brazil
- Melanis opites (Hewitson, 1875) present in Brazil
- Melanis passiena (Hewitson, 1870) present in Colombia
- Melanis pixe (Boisduval, [1836])
  - M. p. pixe present in the US at Texas and Mexico
  - M. p. corvina (Stichel, 1910) present in Colombia
  - M. p. sanguinea (Stichel, 1910) present in Panama and Costa Rica
- Melanis seleukia (Stichel, 1910) present in Brazil
- Melanis smithiae (Westwood, 1851)
  - M. s. smithiae present in Bolivia and Brazil
  - M. s. xarifa (Hewitson, [1853]) present in Colombia and Venezuela
- Melanis unxia (Hewitson, [1853]) present in Brazil
- Melanis vidali (Dognin, 1891) present in Ecuador
- Melanis volusia (Hewitson, [1853]) present in Brazil
- Melanis xenia (Hewitson, [1853])
  - M. x. xenia present in Brazil
  - M. x. ambryllis (Hewitson, 1874) present in Paraguay and Bolivia
- Melanis yeda (Zikán, 1952) present in Brazil

=== Sources ===
- Melanis sur funet
