= Panara, Madhya Pradesh =

Panara
- Census town
- Location in Madhya Pradesh, India Panara (India)
- Coordinates: 22.07°N 78.55°E
- Country: India
- State: Madhya Pradesh
- District: Chhindwara
- Elevation: 733 m (2,405 ft)

Population (2001)
  - Total: 4,144

Languages
  - Official: Hindi
- Time zone: UTC+5:30 (IST)
- ISO 3166 code: IN-MP
- Vehicle registration: MP

Panara is a census town in Chhindwara district in the Indian state of Madhya Pradesh.

== Geography ==
Panara is located at 22.07°N 78.55°E. It has an average elevation of 733 metres (2,404 feet).

== Demographics ==
As of 2001 India census, Panara had a population of 4,144. Males constitute 50% of the population and females 50%. Panara has an average literacy rate of 69%, higher than the national average of 59.5%: male literacy is 76%, and female literacy is 62%. In Panara, 11% of the population is under 6 years of age.
