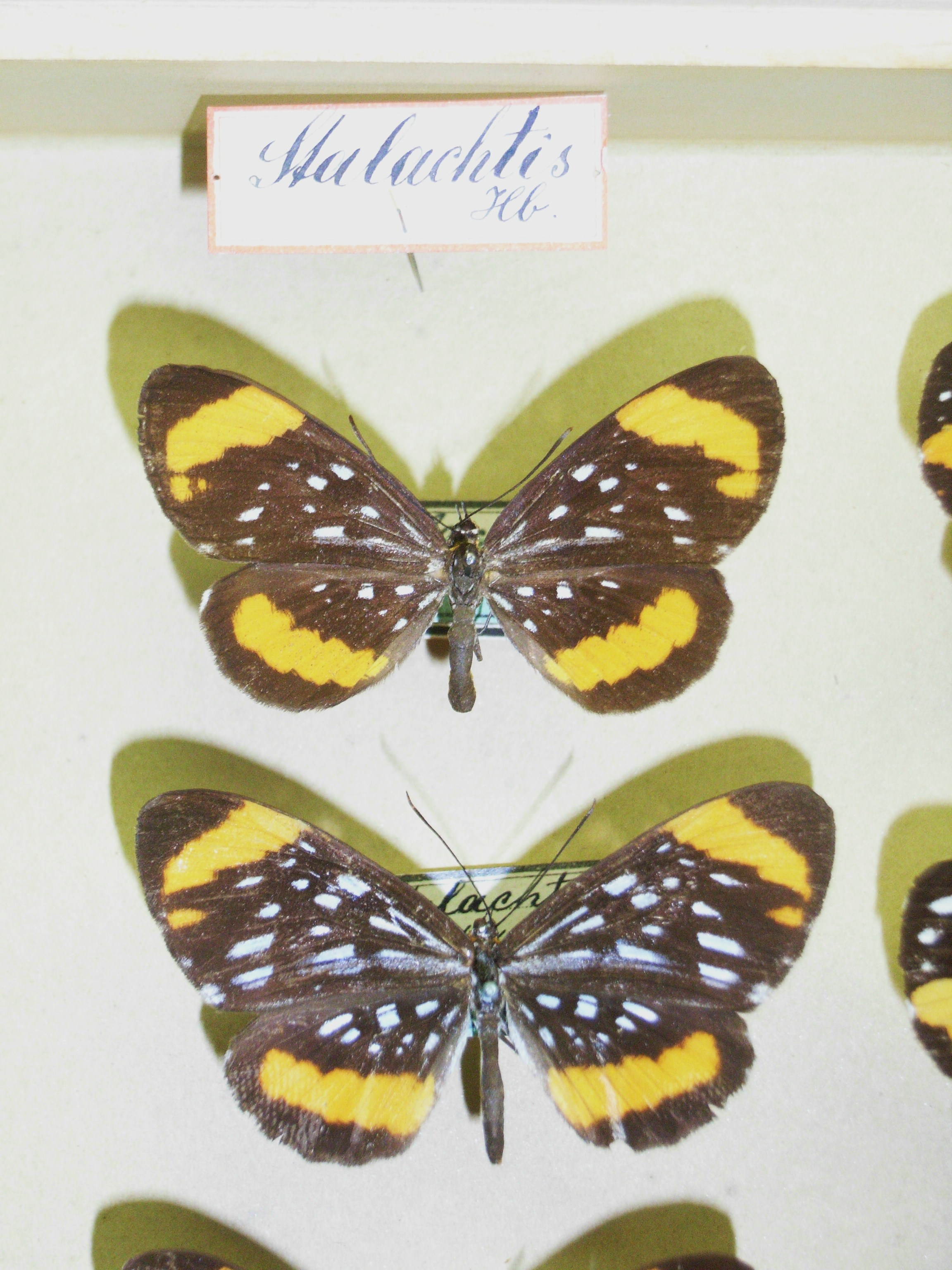

Scientific classification
- Kingdom: Animalia
- Phylum: Arthropoda
- Clade: Pancrustacea
- Class: Insecta
- Order: Lepidoptera
- Family: Riodinidae
- Subfamily: Riodininae
- Genus: Stalachtis; Hübner, 1818

Species
- Several, see text

Synonyms
- Nerias Boisduval, 1836

= Stalachtis =

Genus of butterflies

Stalachtis is a genus of metalmark butterflies (family Riodinidae). It is currently the only member of the tribe Stalachtini, but many metalmark butterflies are yet to be unequivocally assigned to tribes, so this might change eventually.

They are essentially limited to the Amazon biome and the surrounding regions. They are part of complex mimicry rings with Ithomeis, Heliconius and Ithomiinae.

== Selected species ==
- Stalachtis calliope
- Stalachtis euterpe
- Stalachtis halloweeni
- Stalachtis magdalena
- Stalachtis phaedusa
- Stalachtis phlegia
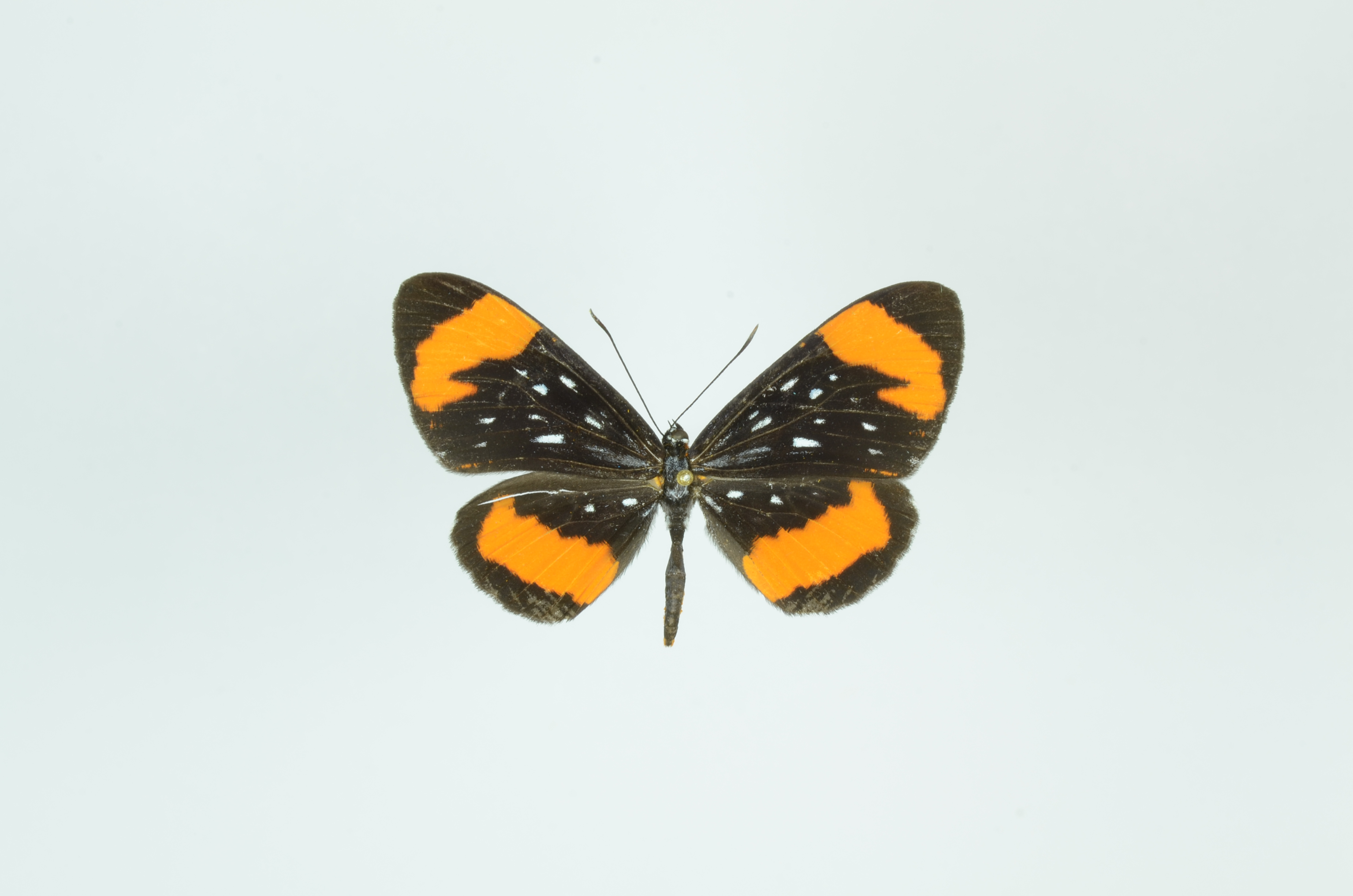
Stalachtis euterpe

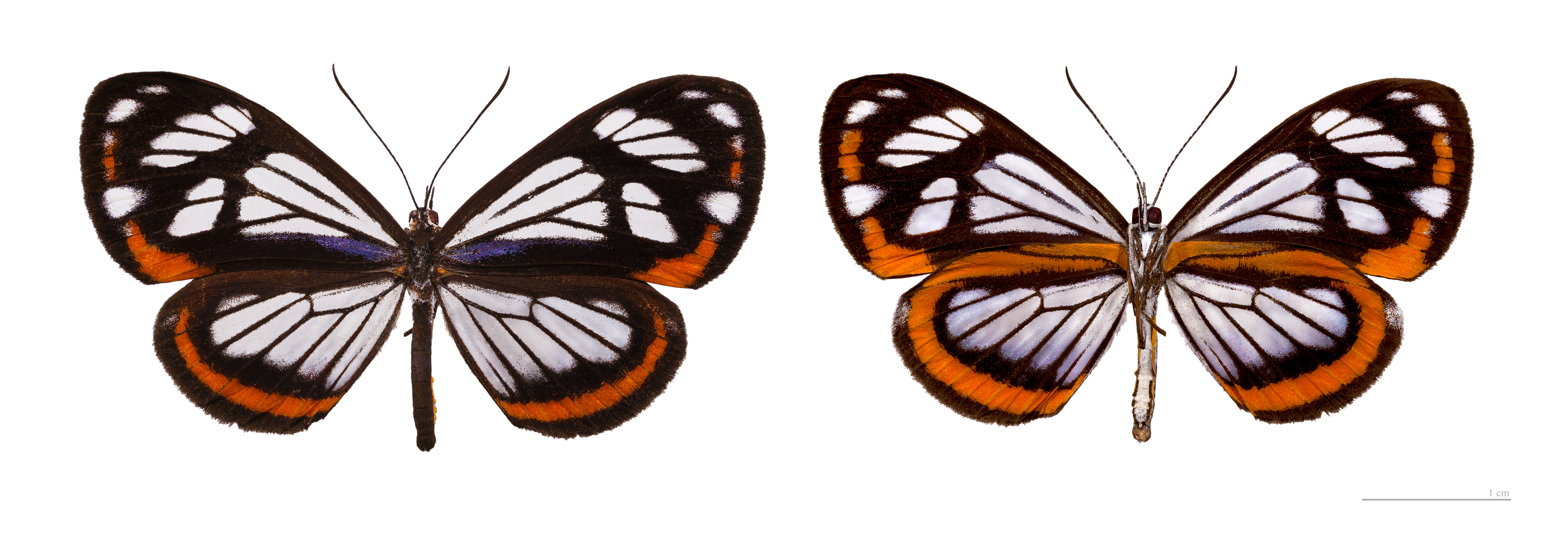
Stalachtis phaedusa
