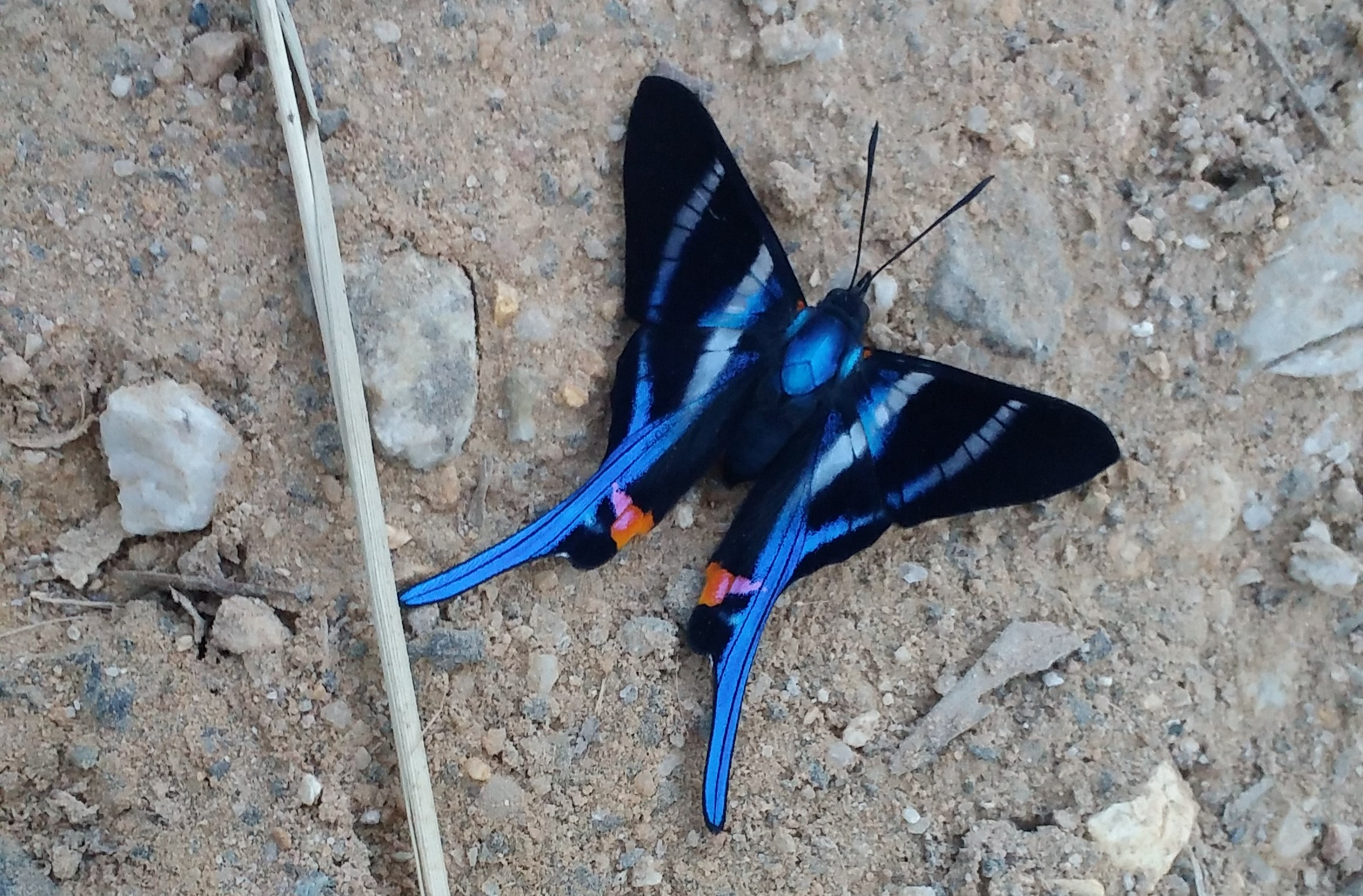
- Rhetus arcius

Scientific classification
- Kingdom: Animalia
- Phylum: Arthropoda
- Clade: Pancrustacea
- Class: Insecta
- Order: Lepidoptera
- Family: Riodinidae
- Subfamily: Riodininae
- Tribe: Riodinini; Grote, 1895

Genera
- Numerous, see text

= Riodinini =

Tribe of butterflies

The Riodinini are one of the large tribes of metalmark butterflies (family Riodinidae). As numerous Riodinidae genera have not yet been unequivocally assigned to a tribe, the genus list is preliminary.

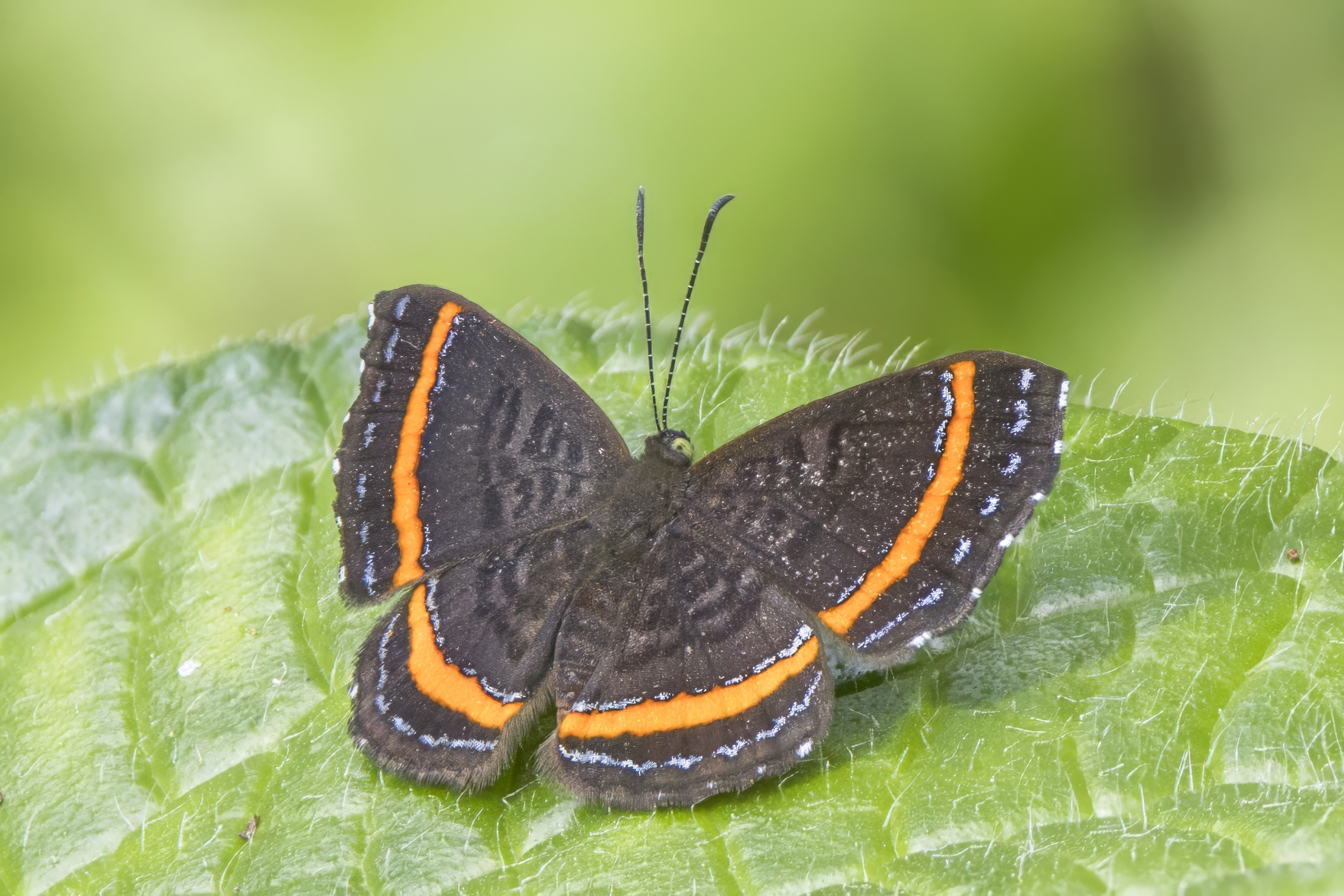
Crocozona coecias, Ecuador

== Selected genera ==
- Amarynthis
- Amphiselenis
- Ancyluris
- Baeotis
- Barbicornis
- Brachyglenis
- Calephelis
- Caria
- Cariomothis
- Cartea
- Chalodeta
- Chamaelimnas
- Charis
- Chorinea
- Colaciticus
- Crocozona
- Cyrenia
- Dachetola
- Detritivora
- Exoplisia
- Isapis
- Ithomeis
- Lasaia
- Lymnas
- Lyropteryx
- Melanis
- Metacharis
- Monethe
- Nahida
- Necyria
- Nirodia
- Notheme
- Panara
- Paraphthonia
- Parcella
- Pheles includes Lepricornis
- Riodina
- Rhetus
- Seco
- Siseme
- Syrmatia
- Themone

== Species gallery ==
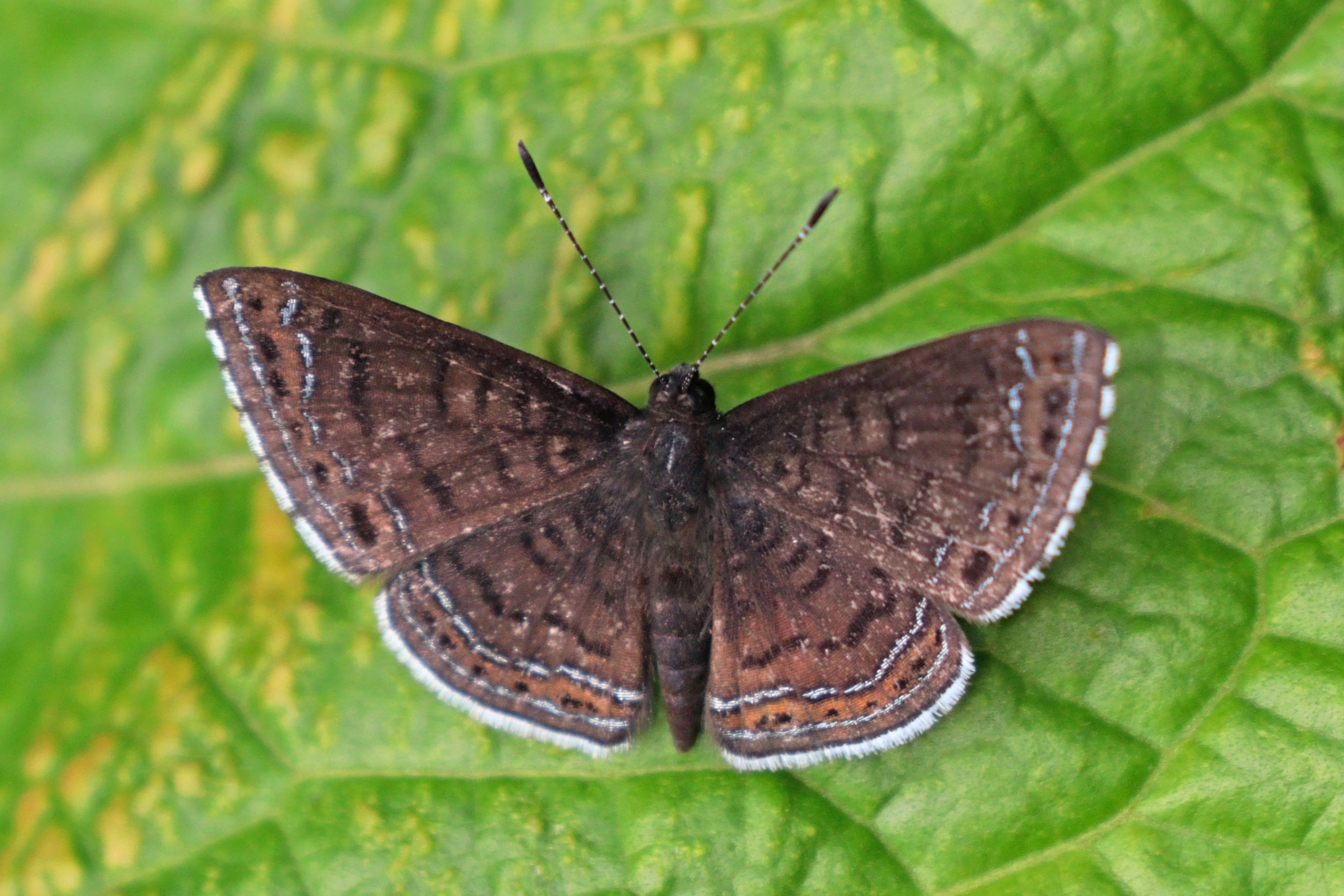
Detritivora hermodora
Hermodora metalmark, Panama

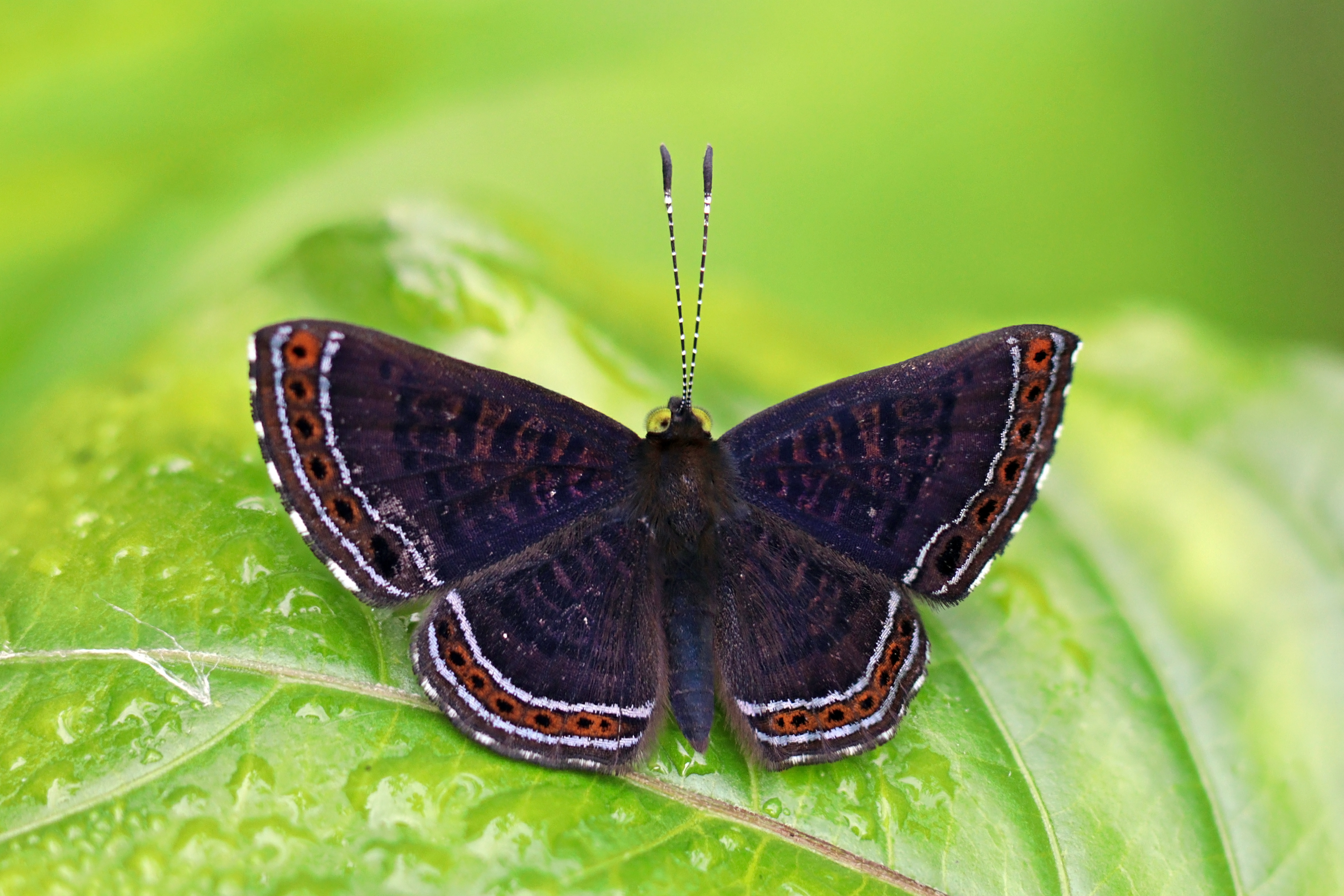
Detritivora barnesi
Barnes' metalmark, Panama

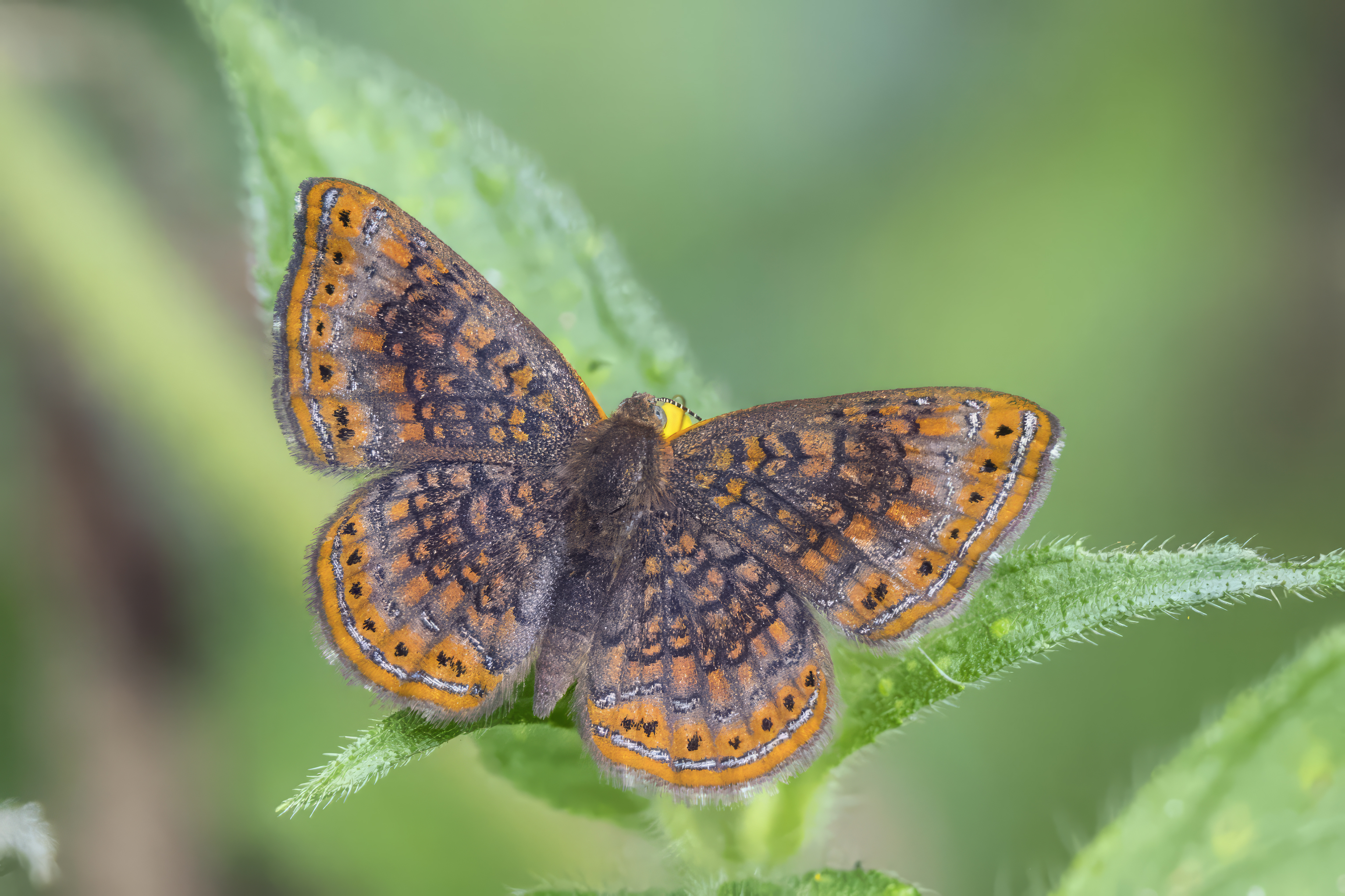
Detritivora gynaea
Gynaea metalmark, Colombia
