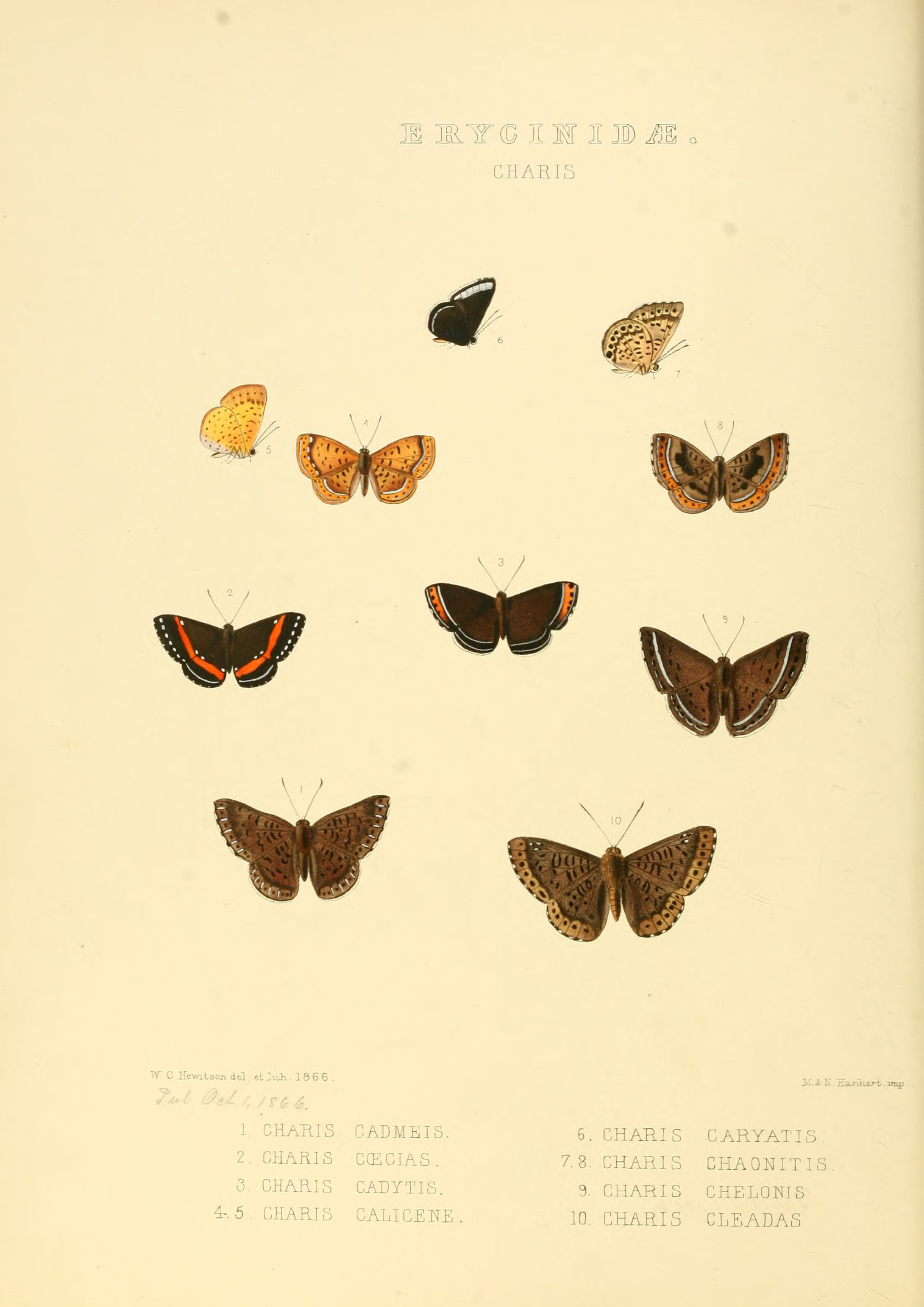
- Callistium cleadas in Illustrations of New Species of Exotic Butterflies (figure 10)

Scientific classification
- Kingdom: Animalia
- Phylum: Arthropoda
- Class: Insecta
- Order: Lepidoptera
- Family: Riodinidae
- Subfamily: Riodininae
- Genus: Callistium; Stichel, 1911

Species
- See text

= Callistium =

Genus of butterflies

Callistium is a butterfly genus in the family Riodinidae. There are two species both resident in the Neotropics.

== Species list ==
- Callistium cleadas (Hewitson, 1866) Guyane, Guyana, Amazon biome
- Callistium maculosa (Bates, 1868) Brazil (Amazonas)

== Sources ==
- Callistium at Markku Savela's website on Lepidoptera
