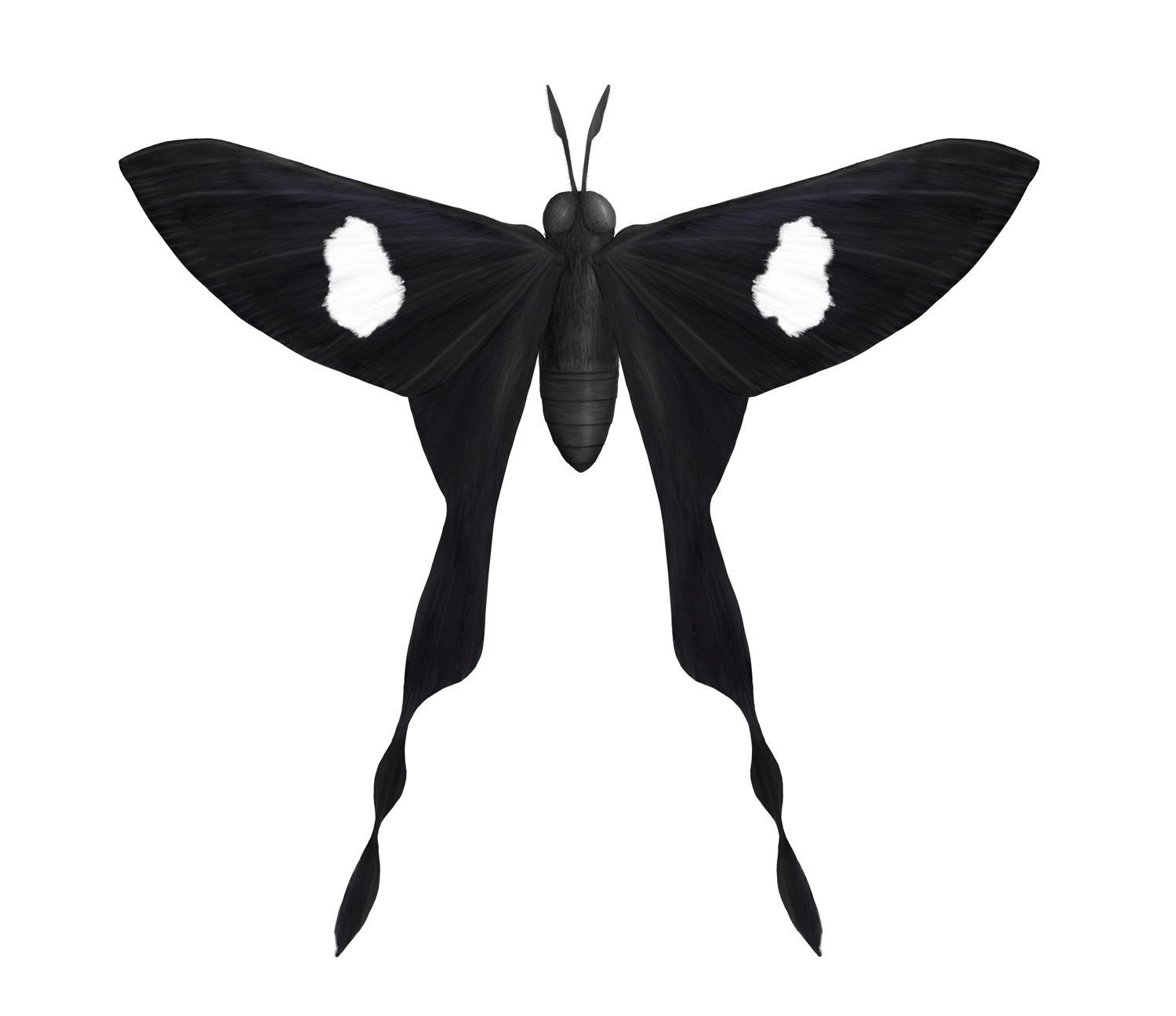
- Drawing of Syrmatia species

Scientific classification
- Domain: Eukaryota
- Kingdom: Animalia
- Phylum: Arthropoda
- Class: Insecta
- Order: Lepidoptera
- Family: Riodinidae
- Subfamily: Riodininae
- Tribe: Riodinini
- Genus: Syrmatia; Hübner, 1819

= Syrmatia =

Genus of butterflies

Syrmatia is a South American metalmark butterfly genus in the subfamily Riodininae.

There are four species in the genus. All are Neotropical and have long tails on the hindwings.
