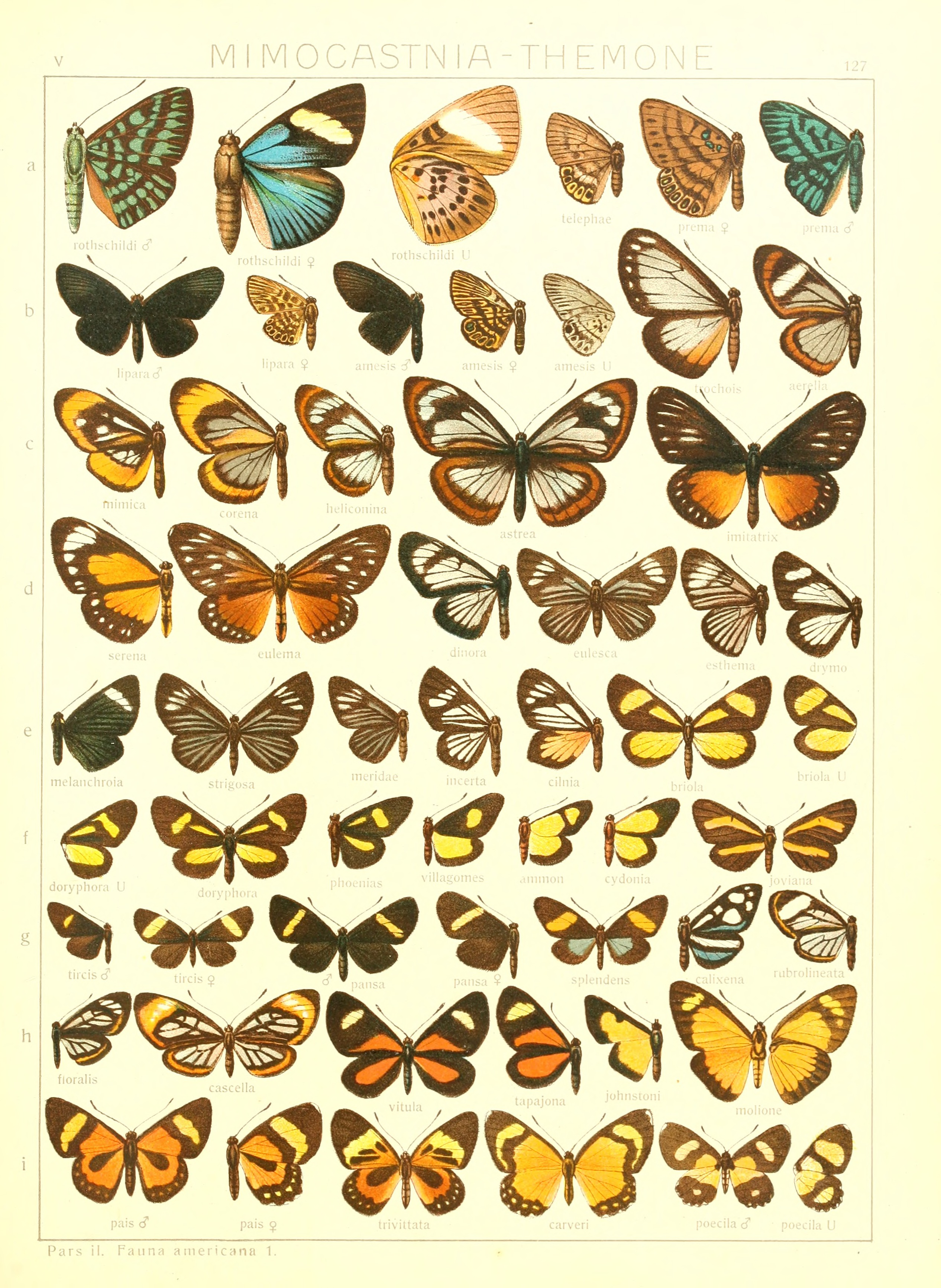
- Pheles and other Riodinidae depicted in Seitz Die Gross-Schmetterlinge der Erde

Scientific classification
- Kingdom: Animalia
- Phylum: Arthropoda
- Class: Insecta
- Order: Lepidoptera
- Family: Riodinidae
- Subfamily: Riodininae
- Tribe: Riodinini
- Genus: Pheles; Herrich-Schäffer, 1858

Synonyms
- Lepricornis C. & R. Felder, [1865]; Otacustesis Dyar, 1914

= Pheles =

Genus of butterflies

Pheles is a genus in the butterfly family Riodinidae present only in the Neotropical realm.

== Species ==
- Pheles atricolor (Butler, 1871) present in French Guiana, Brazil and Peru
- Pheles bicolor (Godman & Salvin, [1886]) present in Panama and Costa Rica (requires confirmation)
- Pheles eulesca (Dyar, 1909) present in Mexico and Panama
- Pheles heliconides Herrich-Schäffer, [1858] present in French Guiana, Guyana, Ecuador and Brazil
- Pheles incerta Staudinger, [1887] present in Colombia and Peru
- Pheles melanchroia (C. & R. Felder, [1865]) present in Mexico and Guatemala
- Pheles ochracea (Stichel, 1910) present in Venezuela and Panama
- Pheles strigosa (Staudinger, 1876) present in Panama, Ecuador, Colombia and Peru

=== Sources ===
- Pheles sur funet
