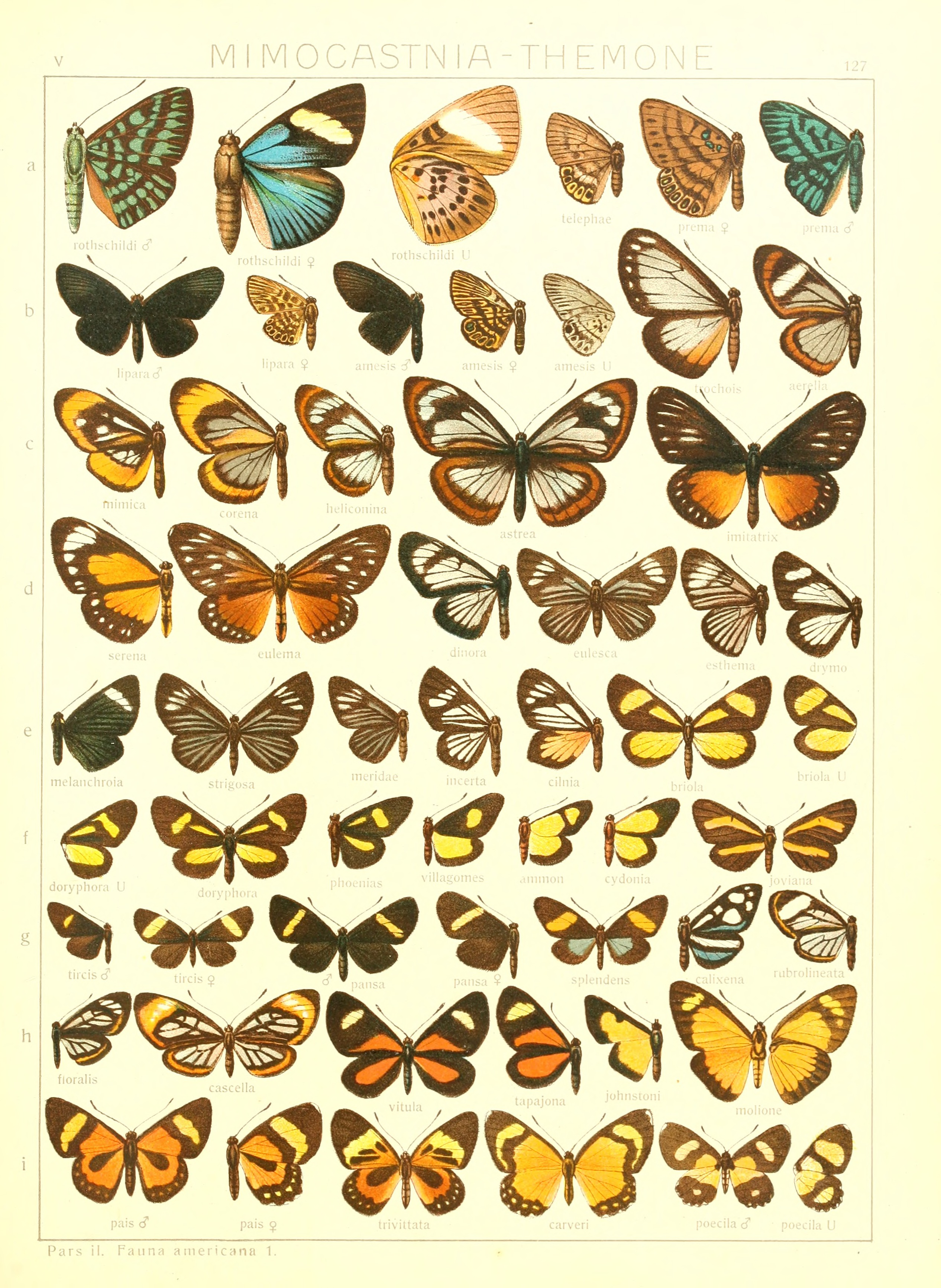
- Several subspecies of the geographically variable Ithomeis aurantiaca in Die Gross-Schmetterlinge der Erde

Scientific classification
- Kingdom: Animalia
- Phylum: Arthropoda
- Clade: Pancrustacea
- Class: Insecta
- Order: Lepidoptera
- Family: Riodinidae
- Subfamily: Riodininae
- Genus: Ithomeis; Bates, 1862

Synonyms
- Ithomiopsis C. & R. Felder, 1862

= Ithomeis =

Genus of butterflies

Ithomeis is a genus in the butterfly family Riodinidae present only in the Neotropical realm.

== Species ==
- Ithomeis aurantiaca Bates, 1862 present in Guyana, Brazil, Colombia, Venezuela, Ecuador and Peru
- Ithomeis eulema Hewitson, 1870 present in Costa Rica, Panama, Venezuela and Colombia

== Biology ==
Both species are mimics. The pattern of black, orange, and large translucent areas found in Ithomeis is shared by toxic genera from the Ithomiinae (examples are Ithomia and Oleria) and a number of toxic Arctiidae. The pattern is also shared with several other Riodinidae genera (examples are Stalachtis, Ithomiola, and Brachyglenis), which may be part of mimicry rings.

I. aurantiaca has several subspecies; some are very different in appearance and were formerly regarded as full species. I. a. satellites and I. a. astrea closely resemble species of Heliconius. Other subspecies include I. a. mimica and I a. stalachtina, which have extensive orange markings and much reduced hyaline areas, and these mimic toxic ithomiines in the genera Pseudoscada, Hyposcada, and Hypoleria. The different subspecies mimic models that share their distribution.

The habitat is tropical forest including cloud forest at 800–1500 m. The eggs are pink, and laid in clusters of 40 to 50 on the upper side of leaves. The larval food plant is Heisteria.

=== References ===
- Ithomeis at Markku Savela's website on Lepidoptera
- Mimicry of glasswings
- TOL
