= Nirodia =

- Nirodia belphegor Westwood, 1851

Conservation status
- Endangered (IUCN 2.3)

Scientific classification
- Kingdom: Animalia
- Phylum: Arthropoda
- Clade: Pancrustacea
- Class: Insecta
- Order: Lepidoptera
- Family: Riodinidae
- Subfamily: Riodininae
- Tribe: Riodinini
- Genus: Nirodia; Westwood, 1851
- Species: N. belphegor

Binomial name
- Nirodia belphegor (Westwood, 1851)

Synonyms
- Rhetus belphegor (Westwood, 1851)

Species of butterfly

Nirodia belphegor is a butterfly species in the monotypic genus Nirodia, according to some authors it belongs to the family Lycaenidae and according to others it belongs to the family Riodinidae. It is endemic to Brazil.
