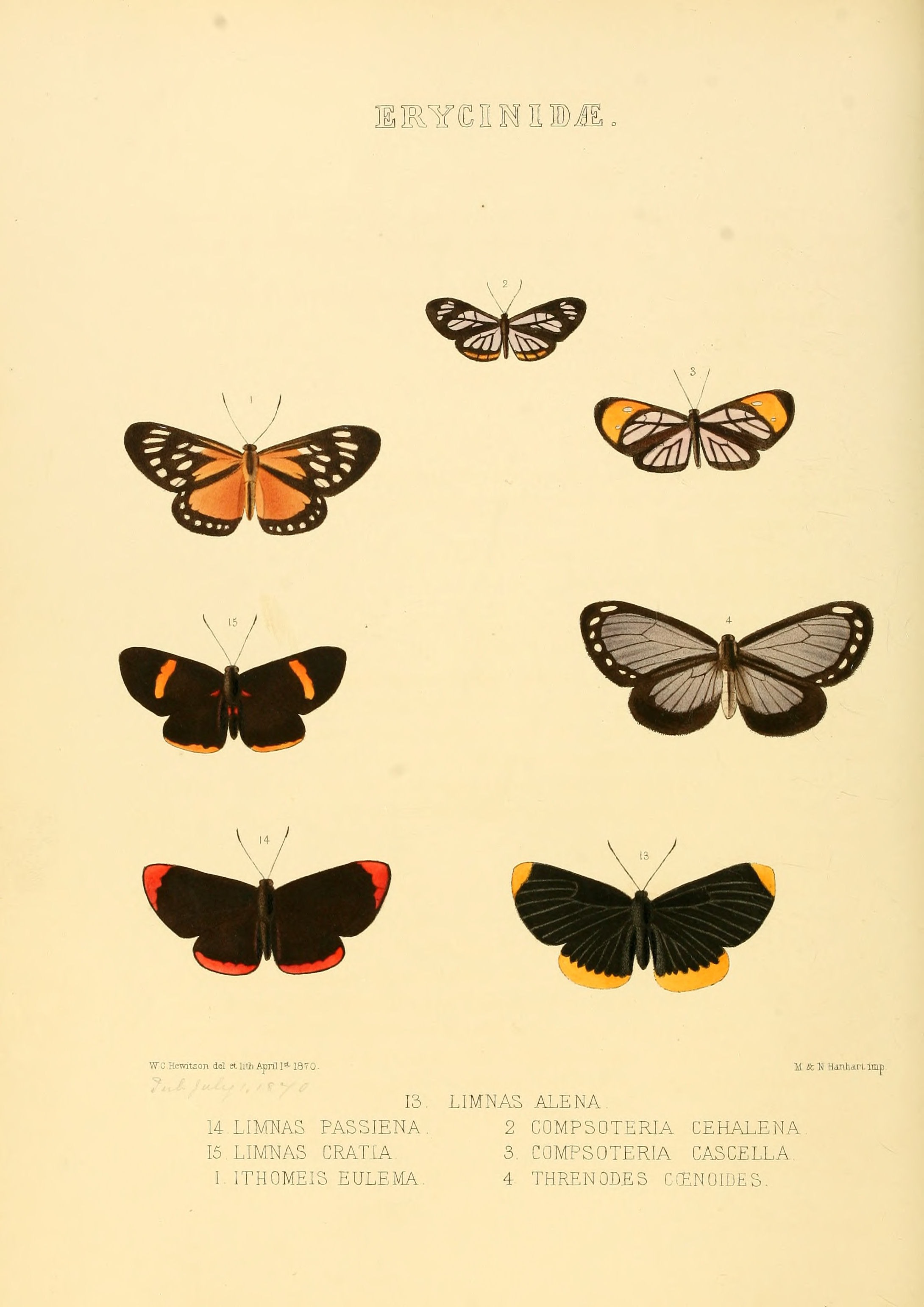
- Nahida coenoides Hewitson's plate accompanying the original description

Scientific classification
- Kingdom: Animalia
- Phylum: Arthropoda
- Clade: Pancrustacea
- Class: Insecta
- Order: Lepidoptera
- Family: Riodinidae
- Subfamily: Riodininae
- Tribe: Riodinini
- Genus: Nahida; Kirby, 1871

Synonyms
- Threnodes Hewitson, 1870

= Nahida (butterfly) =

Genus of butterflies

Nahida is a genus in the butterfly family Riodinidae present only in the Neotropical realm.

== Species ==
There are four species in the genus:

- N. coenoides (type Hewitson, 1869)
- N. ecuadorica Strand, 1911
- N. serena Stichel, 1910
- N. trochois Hewitson, 1877
