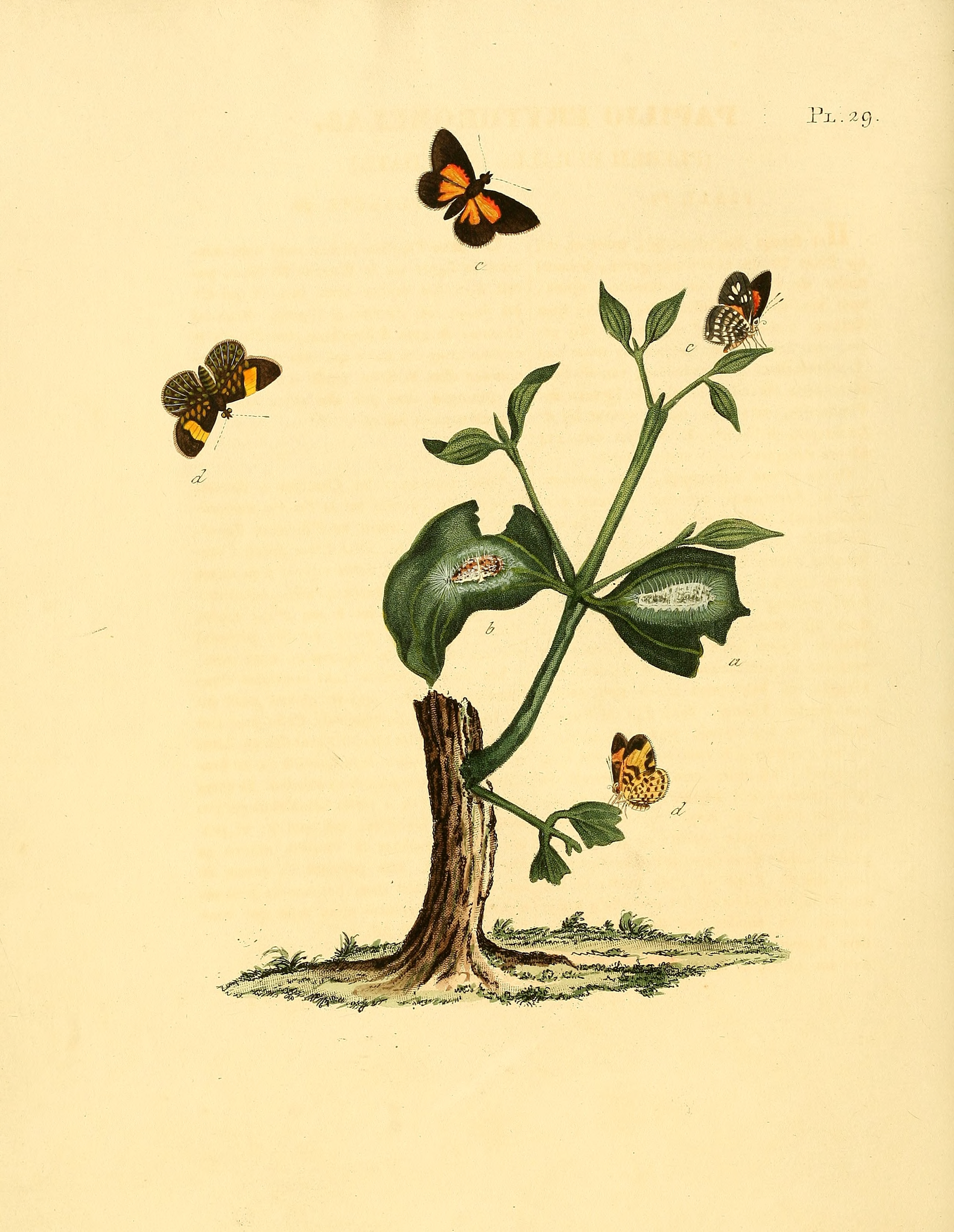
- Cariomothis erythromelas in Surinaamsche vlinders

Scientific classification
- Kingdom: Animalia
- Phylum: Arthropoda
- Class: Insecta
- Order: Lepidoptera
- Family: Riodinidae
- Subfamily: Riodininae
- Genus: Cariomothis; Stichel, 1910

Species
- See text

= Cariomothis =

Genus of butterflies

Cariomothis is a butterfly genus in the family Riodinidae. They are resident in the Neotropics.

== Species list ==
- Cariomothis chia (Hübner, 1823) Suriname
- Cariomothis erotylus Stichel, 1910 Bolivia, Peru.
- Cariomothis erythromelas (Sepp, [1848]) Suriname, Ecuador, Brazil.
- Cariomothis poeciloptera (Godman & Salvin, 1878) Costa Rica, Panama, Colombia

== Sources ==
- Cariomothis
