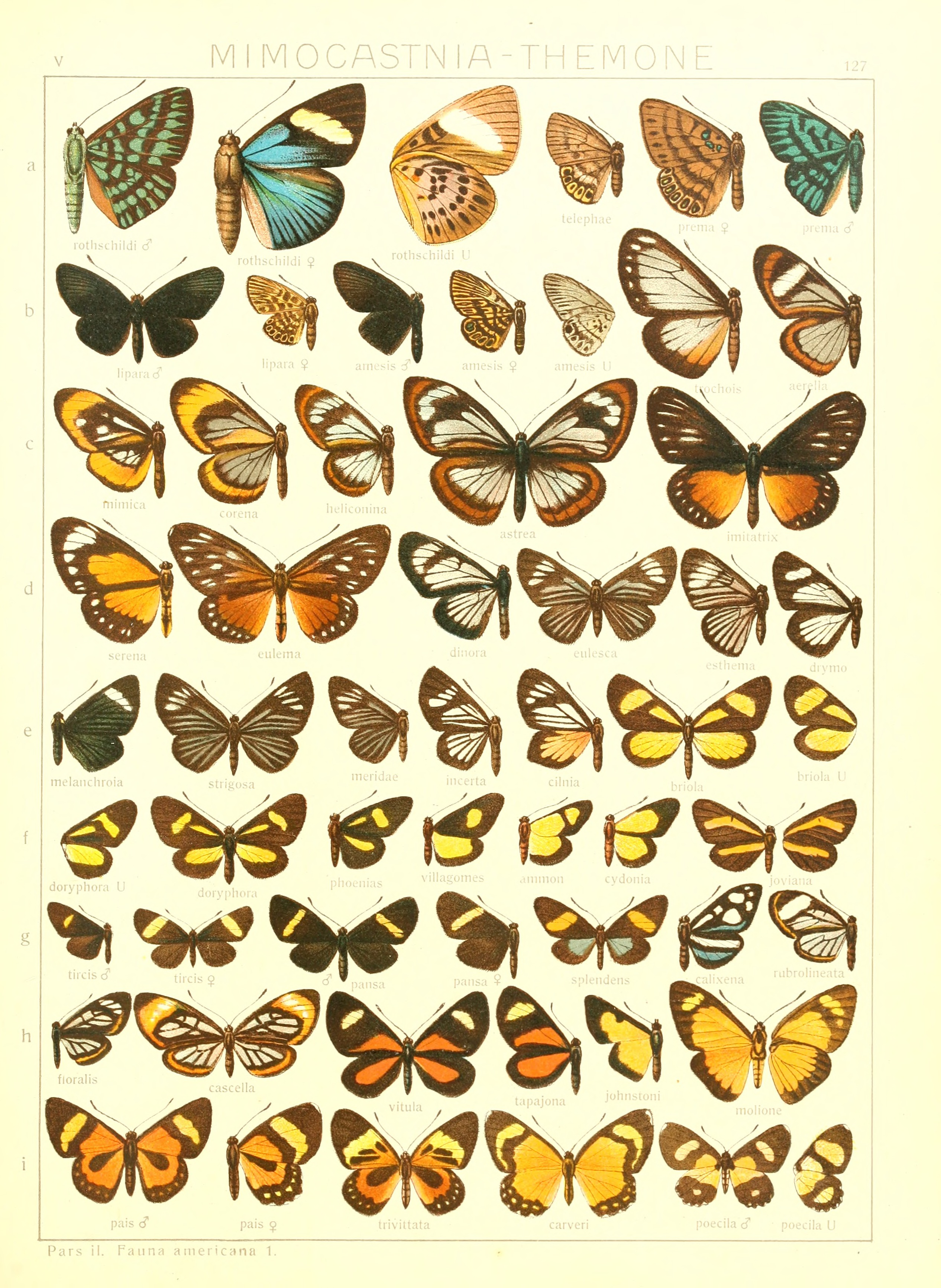
- Colaciticus johnstoni in Seitz (127h)

Scientific classification
- Kingdom: Animalia
- Phylum: Arthropoda
- Class: Insecta
- Order: Lepidoptera
- Family: Riodinidae
- Subfamily: Riodininae
- Genus: Colaciticus; Stichel, 1910

Species
- See text

= Colaciticus =

Genus of butterflies

Colaciticus is a butterfly genus in the family Riodinidae. They are resident in the Neotropics.

== Species list ==
- Colaciticus banghaasi Seitz, 1917 Brazil.
- Colaciticus johnstoni (Dannatt, 1904) Guyana, Brazil.

== Sources ==
- Colaciticus
