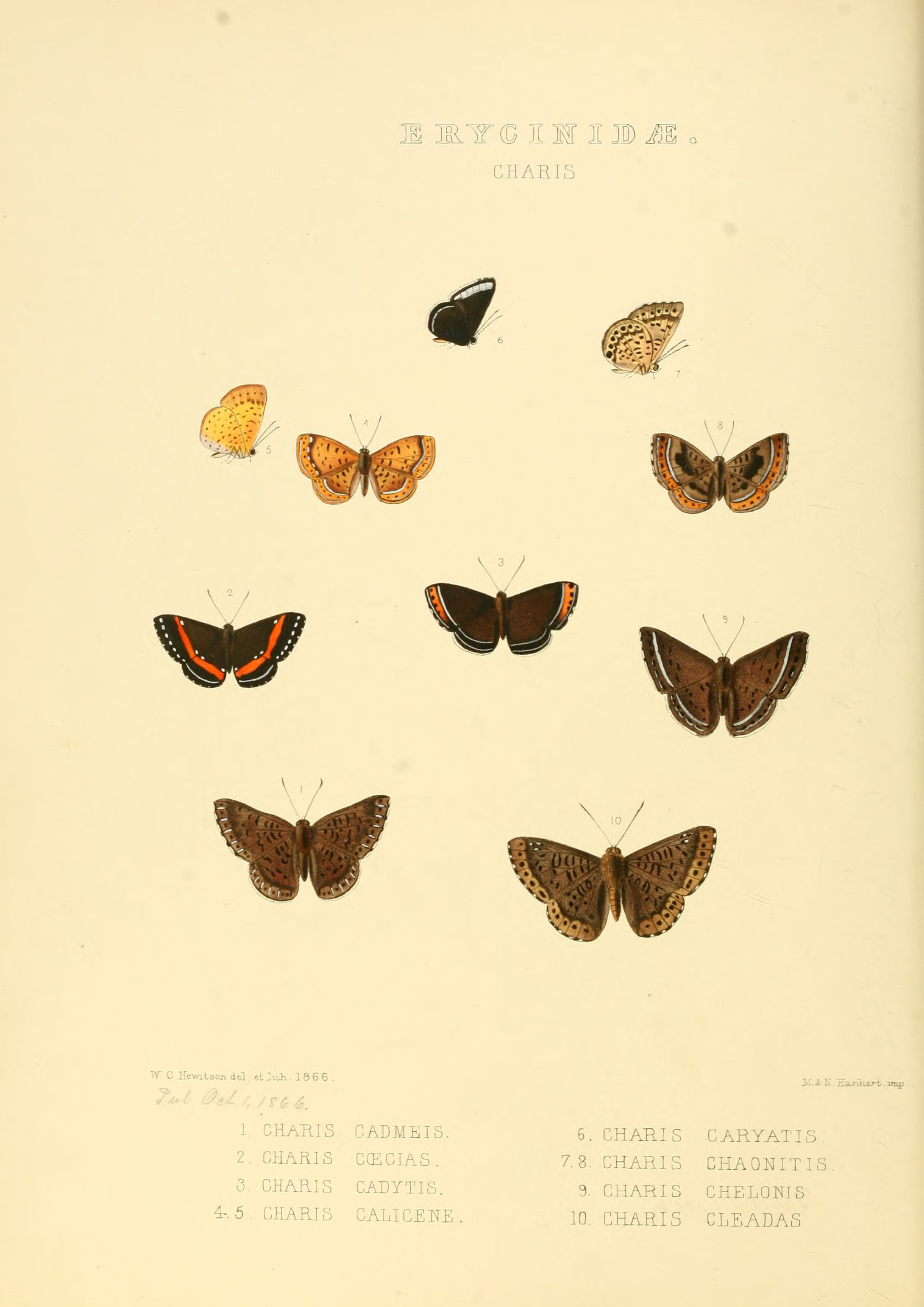
- Chalodeta in Illustrations of New Species of Exotic Butterflies (figures 7-10)

Scientific classification
- Kingdom: Animalia
- Phylum: Arthropoda
- Class: Insecta
- Order: Lepidoptera
- Family: Riodinidae
- Subfamily: Riodininae
- Genus: Chalodeta; Stichel, 1910

Species
- See text

= Chalodeta =

Genus of butterflies

Chalodeta is a butterfly genus in the family Riodinidae. They are resident in the Neotropics.

== Species list ==
- Chalodeta chaonitis (Hewitson, [1866]) Mexico, Ecuador, Guyana, French Guiana, Trinidad and Tobago, Brazil
- Chalodeta chelonis (Hewitson, [1866]) Brazil
- Chalodeta chitinosa Hall, 2002 Venezuela, Colombia, Ecuador, Guyana, Bolivia, Brazil
- Chalodeta chlosine Hall, 2002 Colombia, Ecuador, Bolivia, Brazil, Peru
- Chalodeta lypera (Bates, 1868) Guatemala, Brazil
- Chalodeta panurga Stichel, 1910
- Chalodeta pescada Hall & Willmott, 1998 Ecuador
- Chalodeta theodora (C. & R. Felder, 1862) Brazil, Peru, Bolivia, Colombia

== Sources ==
- Chalodeta at Markku Savela's website on Lepidoptera
