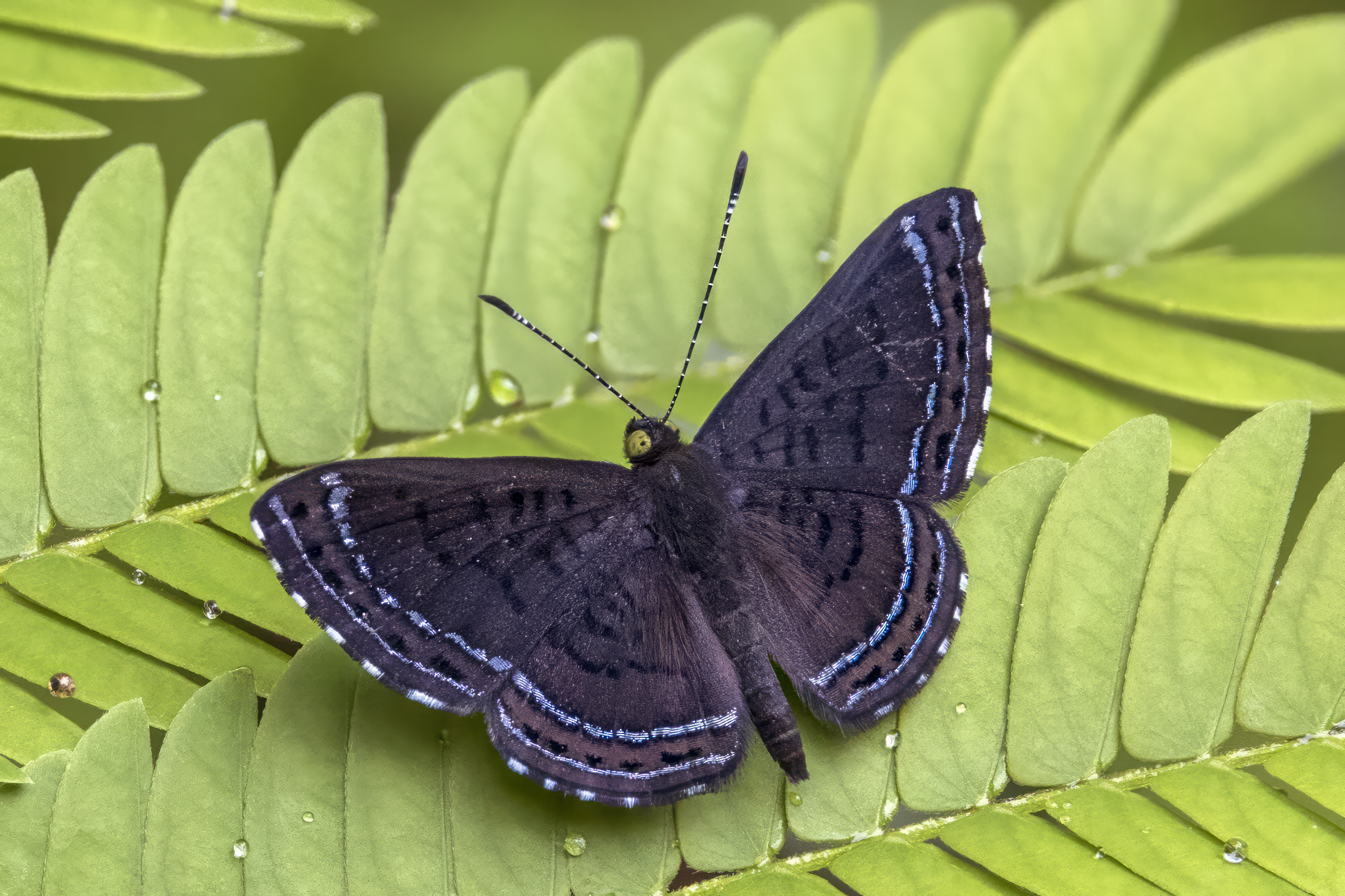
- Anius metalmark (C.anius) male Antioquia, Colombia

Scientific classification
- Kingdom: Animalia
- Phylum: Arthropoda
- Clade: Pancrustacea
- Class: Insecta
- Order: Lepidoptera
- Family: Riodinidae
- Tribe: Riodinini
- Genus: Charis; Hübner, 1819

Synonyms
- Charmona Stichel, 1910; Charmonana Hemming, 1967; Charmonona Strand, 1932; Sarota Westwood, 1851

= Charis (butterfly) =

Genus of butterflies

Charis is a genus of the Riodinini tribe of metalmark butterflies (family Riodinidae). Nineteen species have been identified within the Charis cleonus complex (however, further analysis has revised this clade to contain 22 species) and eight species within the Charis gynaea group (clade). Charis butterflies are common in the Neotropics and often live in primary and secondary growth. The Charis cleonus group exhibits contemporary parapatric distributions throughout Amazonia and are thought to have speciated allopatrically; residing in "areas of endemism". Some evidence suggests that Charis (among other Riodininae groups) are reproductively isolated by mating preferences for different topographic areas and different times—of which, may have promoted speciation between the various groups.

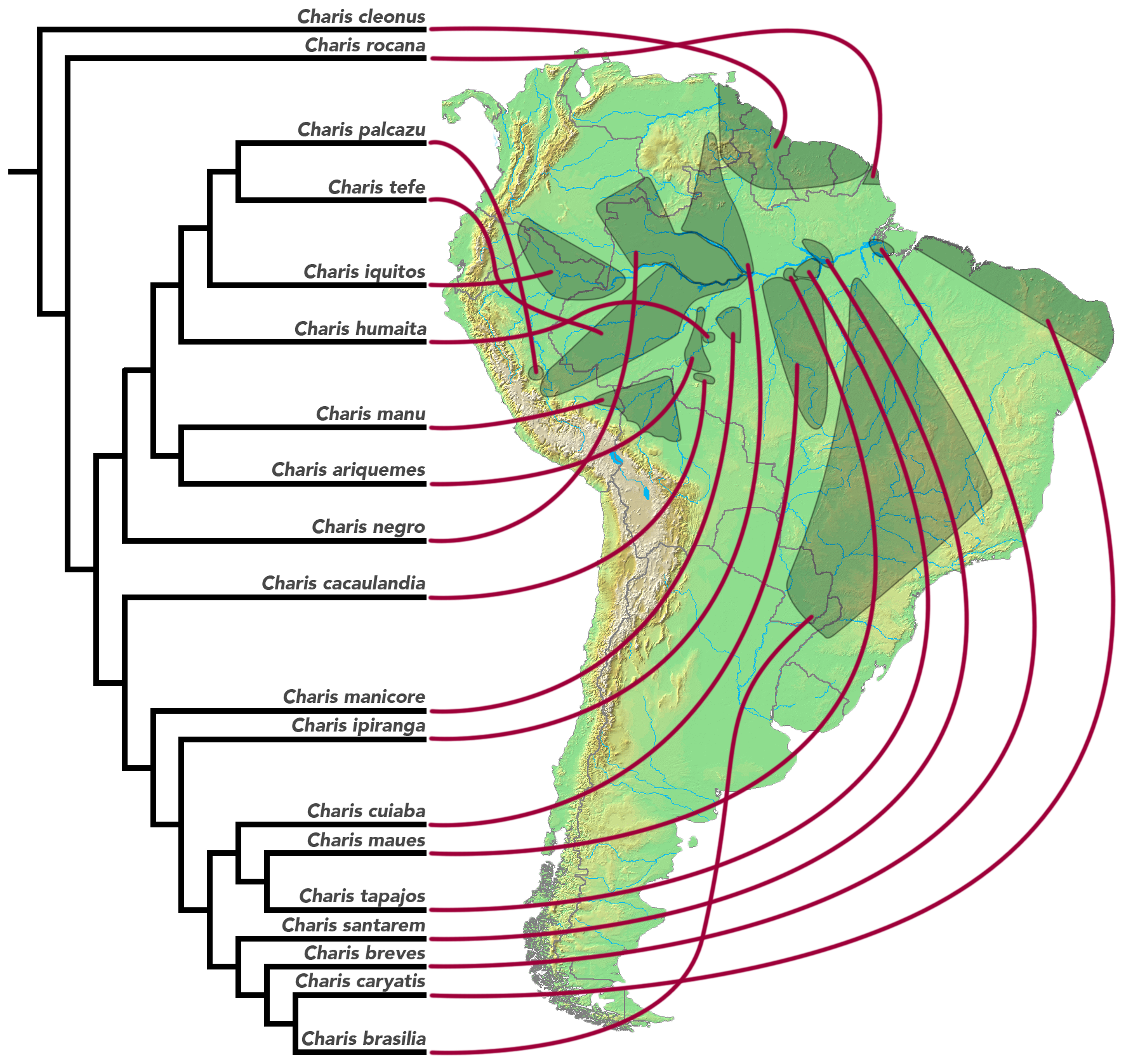
A cladogram of species in the Charis cleonus group superimposed over a map of South America showing the biogeographic ranges or each species

== Species ==
- Charis cleonus complex
  - Charis major subgroup
    - Charis ma Harvey & Hall, 2002
    - Charis major (Lathy, 1932)
    - Charis matic Harvey & Hall, 2002
  - Charis cleonus subgroup
    - Charis ariquemes Harvey & Hall, 2002
    - Charis brasilia Harvey & Hall, 2002
    - Charis breves Harvey & Hall, 2002
    - Charis cacaulandia Harvey & Hall, 2002
    - Charis caryatis Hewitson, 1866
    - Charis cleonus (Stoll, 1781)
    - Charis cuiaba Harvey & Hall, 2002
    - Charis humaita Harvey & Hall, 2002
    - Charis ipiranga Harvey & Hall, 2002
    - Charis iquitos Harvey & Hall, 2002
    - Charis manicore Harvey & Hall, 2002
    - Charis manu Harvey & Hall, 2002
    - Charis maues Harvey & Hall, 2002
    - Charis negro Harvey & Hall, 2002
    - Charis palcazu Harvey & Hall, 2002
    - Charis rocana Harvey & Hall, 2002
    - Charis santarem Harvey & Hall, 2002
    - Charis tapajos Harvey & Hall, 2002
    - Charis tefe Harvey & Hall, 2002
- Charis gynaea group
  - Charis barnesi Hall & Harvey, 2001
  - Charis callaghani Hall & Harvey, 2001
  - Charis gallardi Hall & Harvey, 2001
  - Charis gynaea (Godart, 1824)
  - Charis nicolayi Hall & Harvey, 2001
  - Charis smalli Hall & Harvey, 2001
  - Charis zama Bates, 1868
