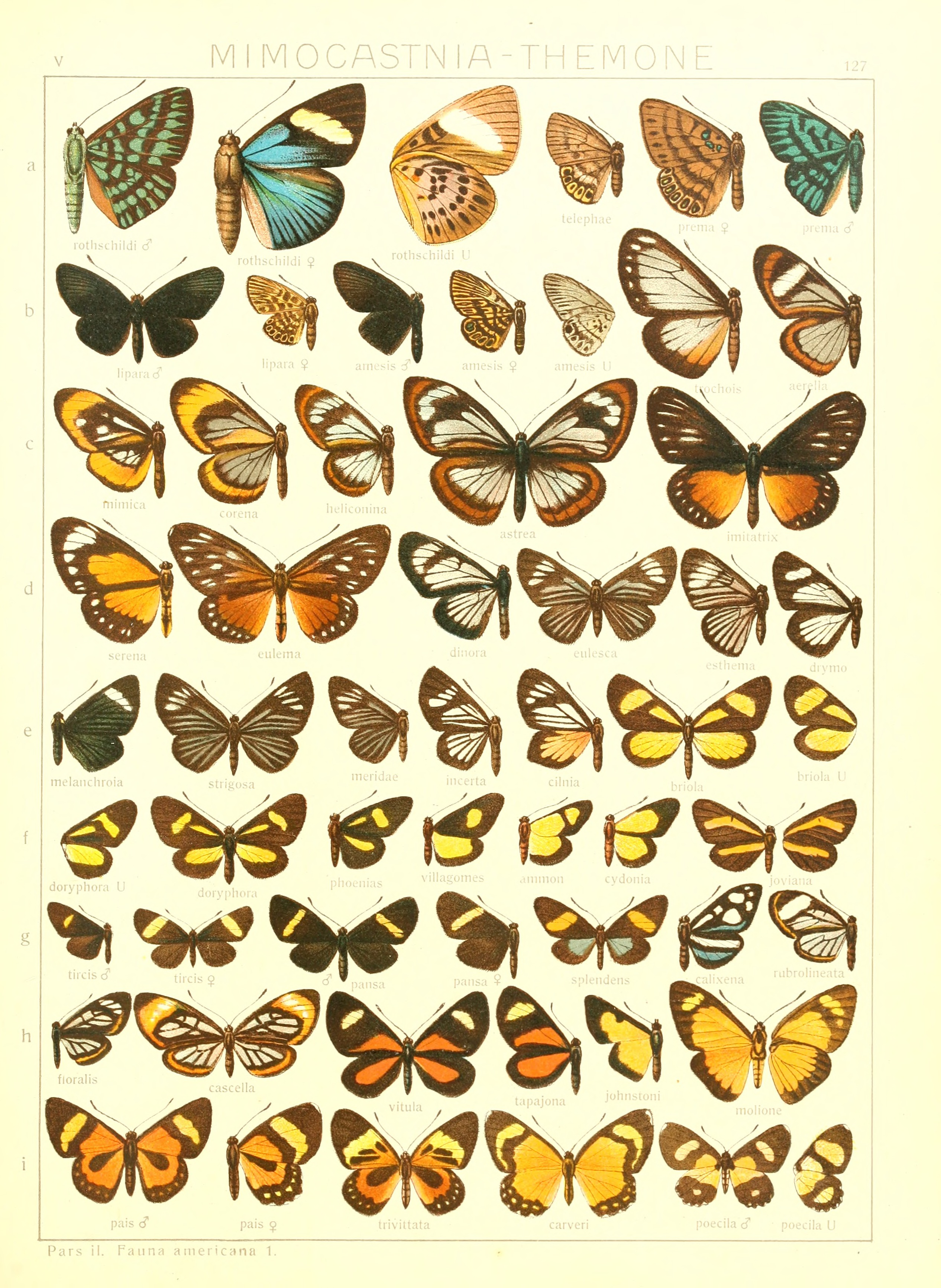

Scientific classification
- Kingdom: Animalia
- Phylum: Arthropoda
- Class: Insecta
- Order: Lepidoptera
- Family: Riodinidae
- Subfamily: Riodininae
- Genus: Paraphthonia; Stichel, 1910

= Paraphthonia =

Genus of butterflies

Paraphthonia is a genus in the butterfly family Riodinidae present only in the Neotropical realm.

== Species ==
- Paraphthonia cteatus Seitz, 1917 present in Peru.
- Paraphthonia molione (Godman, 1903) present in Peru.

=== Sources ===
- Paraphthonia sur funet
