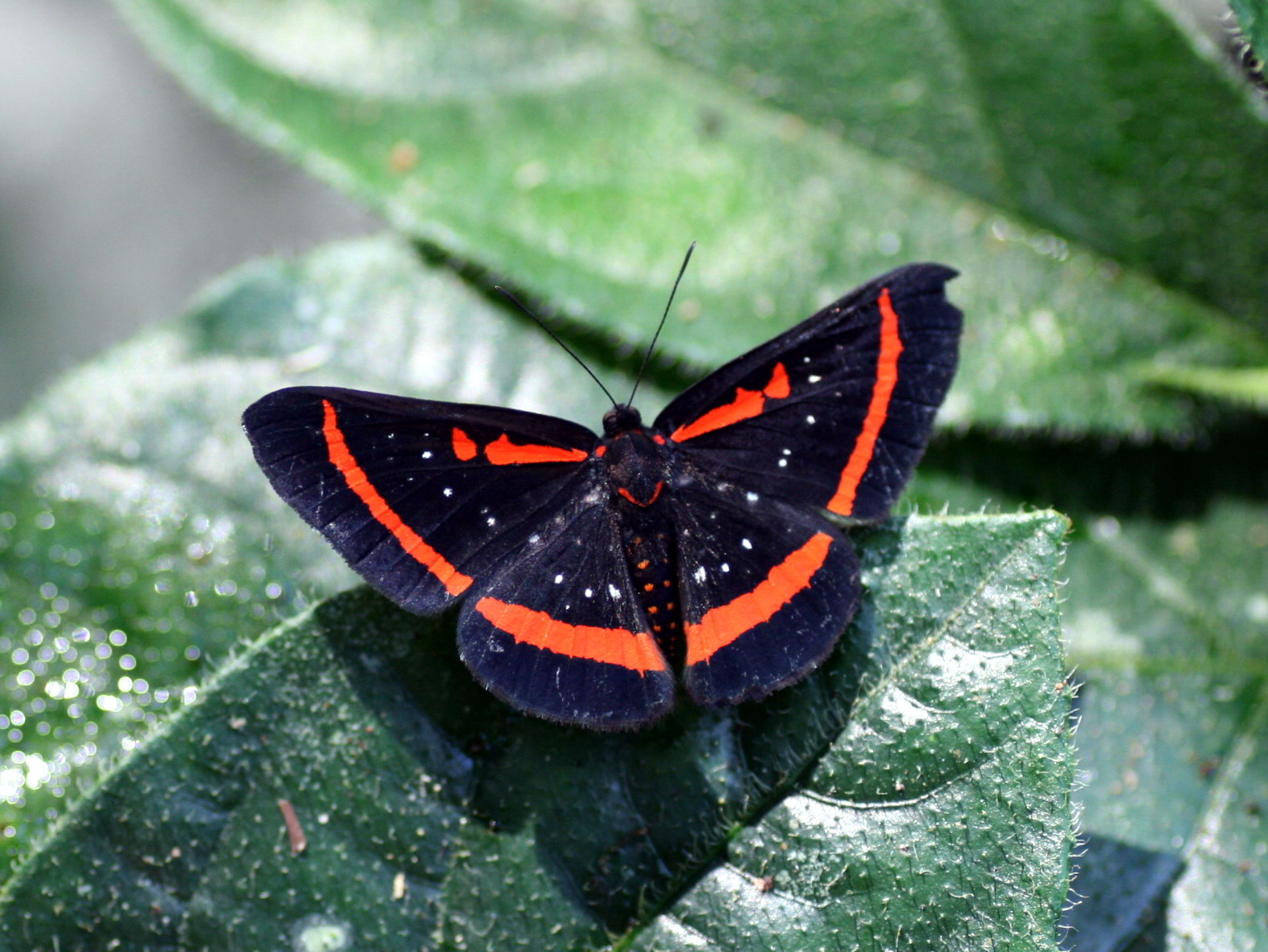

Scientific classification
- Kingdom: Animalia
- Phylum: Arthropoda
- Clade: Pancrustacea
- Class: Insecta
- Order: Lepidoptera
- Family: Riodinidae
- Tribe: Riodinini
- Genus: Amarynthis; Hübner, 1819
- Species: A. meneria

Binomial name
- Amarynthis meneria (Cramer, 1776)

Synonyms
- Papilio meneria Cramer, 1776; Papilio micalia Cramer, 1776; Hesperia maecenas Fabricius, 1793 (preocc. Fabricius, 1793); Hesperia dimas Fabricius, 1796; Amarynthis meneria f. conflata Stichel, 1910; Amarynthis meneria stenogramma Stichel, 1910; Amarynthis coccitincta Seitz, 1913; Amarynthis superior Seitz, 1913

= Amarynthis =

Genus of butterflies

Amarynthis is a monotypic genus of butterflies in the family Riodinidae. Its sole species, Amarynthis meneria, the meneria metalmark, is a common species in lowland rainforests east of the Andes from Venezuela, Suriname and Guyana, south through the Brazilian Amazon to Peru and northern Argentina.

The wings are very delicate; the veins deviate from those of Amblygonia only by the 3rd subcostal vein not rising immediately before the cell-end, but immediately behind it. It is black with a narrow red transverse band and sparse light, small dots:in the cell of the forewing a red cuneiform streak, behind it a small red spot.
