= Polystichtis =

Scientific classification
- Kingdom: Animalia
- Phylum: Arthropoda
- Clade: Pancrustacea
- Class: Insecta
- Order: Lepidoptera
- Family: Riodinidae
- Genus: Polystichtis; Hübner, 1819

Genus of insects

Polystichtis is a genus of butterflies. Polystichtis belongs to the family Riodinidae.

== Species in Polystichtis ==
- Polystichtis antanitis
- Polystichtis apotheta
- Polystichtis argenissa
- Polystichtis byzeres
- Polystichtis candace
- Polystichtis cerealis
- Polystichtis cilissa
- Polystichtis emylius
- Polystichtis eupolemia
- Polystichtis fannia
- Polystichtis flegia
- Polystichtis flora
- Polystichtis idmon
- Polystichtis laobates
- Polystichtis latona
- Polystichtis luceres
- Polystichtis lucetia
- Polystichtis lucianus
- Polystichtis lyncestes
- Polystichtis maeon
- Polystichtis maeonoides
- Polystichtis martia
- Polystichtis martialis
- Polystichtis nepioides
- Polystichtis parthaon
- Polystichtis pelarge
- Polystichtis phoronis
- Polystichtis pione
- Polystichtis rhodope
- Polystichtis rubrica
- Polystichtis separata
- Polystichtis sudias
- Polystichtis zeanger
- Polystichtis zeurippa
