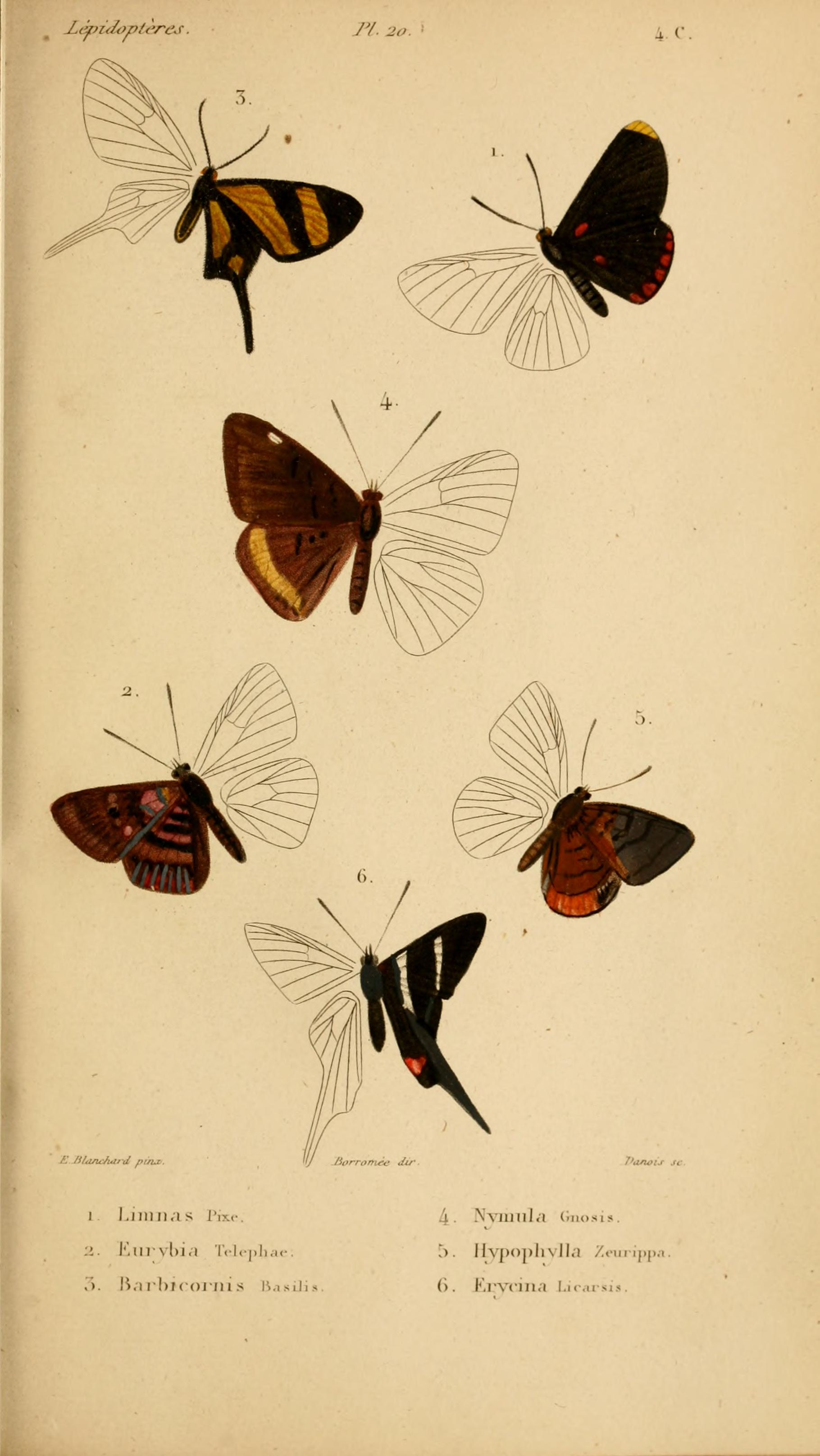
- Boisduval's figure of Barbicornis basilis
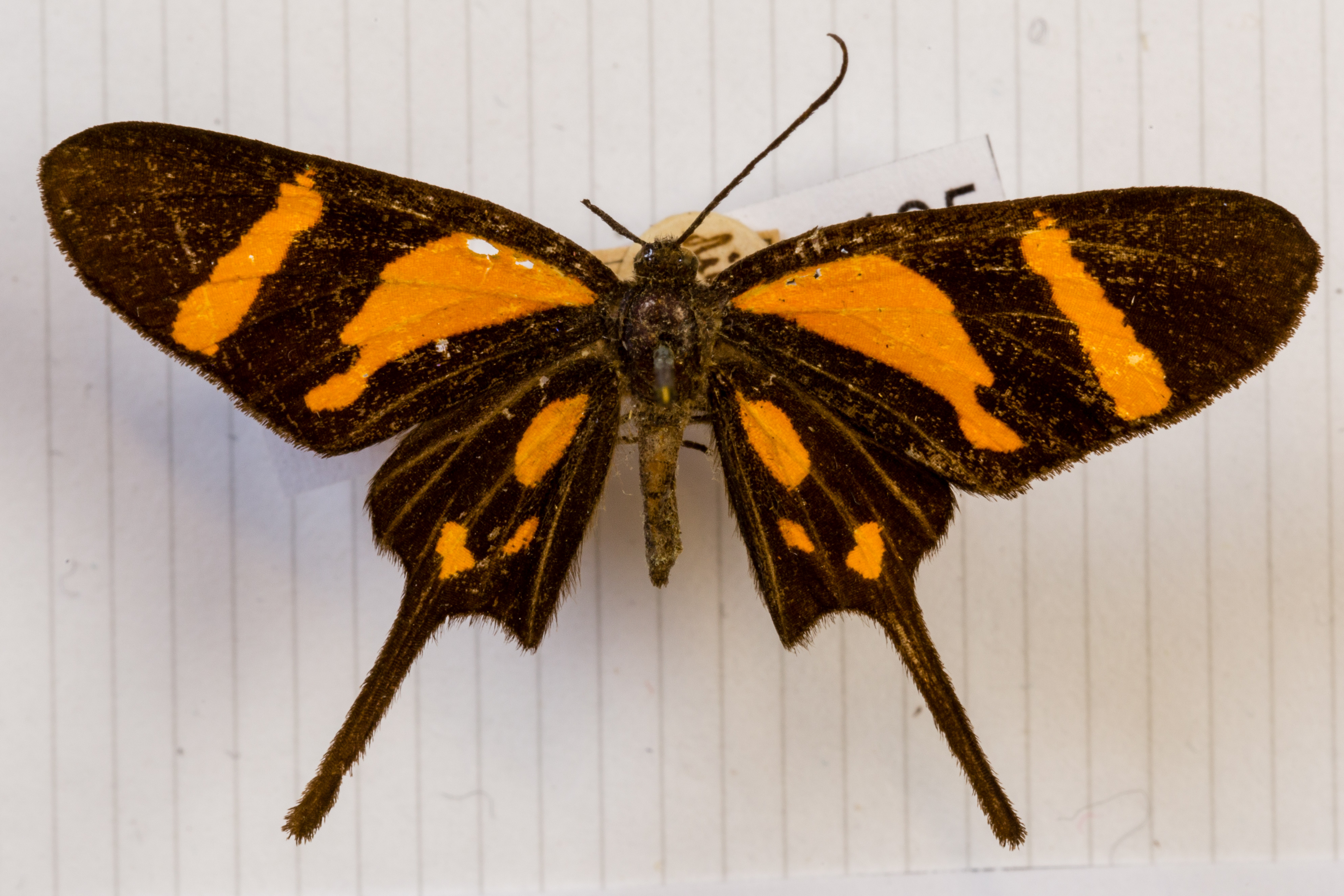

Scientific classification
- Kingdom: Animalia
- Phylum: Arthropoda
- Class: Insecta
- Order: Lepidoptera
- Family: Riodinidae
- Subfamily: Riodininae
- Tribe: Riodinini
- Genus: Barbicornis; Godart, [1824]
- Species: B. basilis

Binomial name
- Barbicornis basilis Godart, [1824]

Synonyms
- Chroma Gray, 1832; Barbicornis melanops Butler, 1873; Barbicornis dibaphina Butler, 1873; Barbicornis polyplaga Seitz, 1913; Barbicornis melanops ab. alyconeus Seitz, 1913; Barbicornis cuneifera Seitz, 1913; Barbicornis var. conjuncta Zikán, 1952; Barbicornis var. magniplaga Zikán, 1952; Barbicornis marginata Seitz, 1913; Barbicornis melanopa f. apotacta Stichel, 1909; Barbicornis mona f. moneta Stichel, 1909; Barbicornis melanops fusus Seitz, 1913; Barbicornis melanops aterrima Seitz, 1913; Barbicornis mona cinaropsis Seitz, 1916; Barbicornis mona f. monacha Stichel, 1924; Barbicornis mona f. perfectissima Stichel, 1928

= Barbicornis =

Genus of butterflies

Barbicornis is a monotypic butterfly genus of the family Riodinidae with its single species Barbicornis basilis present in Paraguay, Brazil and Argentina.

The species is easily recognizable by the very small hindwings provided with a long apex of the tail on the lower radial (uppermost median) vein. The original description was published in Encyclopédie Méthodique. They drink early in the morning from wet stones and places on roads or tracks and rest during the day beneath leaves.

== Subspecies ==
- Barbicornis basilis basilis (Paraguay, Brazil: Espírito Santo, Rio de Janeiro)
- Barbicornis basilis acroleuca Berg, 1896 (Paraguay)
- Barbicornis basilis bahiana Azzará, 1978 (Brazil: Bahia)
- Barbicornis basilis ephippium Thieme, 1907
- Barbicornis basilis marginata Seitz, 1913 (Brazil: Bahia) brownish black with an orange-red collar.The apical margin of the forewing and the whole distal margin of the hindwing, including the xiphoid, honey-yellow. Bahia.
- Barbicornis basilis mona Westwood, 1851 (Paraguay, Brazil: Espírito Santo)
- Barbicornis basilis paraopeba Azzará, 1978 (Brazil: Minas Gerais)
- Barbicornis basilis tucumana Thieme, 1907 (Argentina)

[7]

== Sources ==
- Barbicornis sur funet
