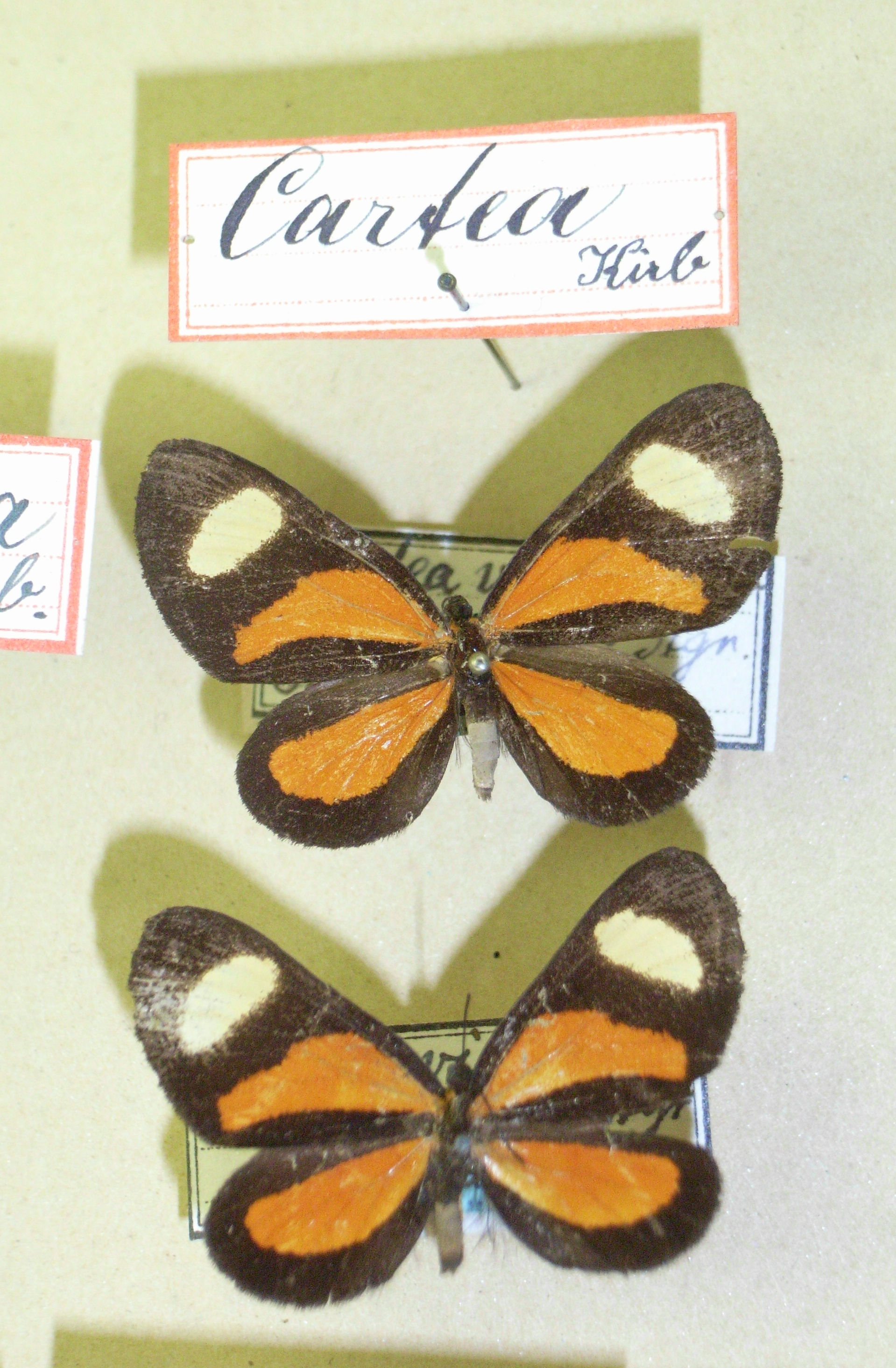
- Cartea vitula in Museum Wiesbaden

Scientific classification
- Kingdom: Animalia
- Phylum: Arthropoda
- Class: Insecta
- Order: Lepidoptera
- Family: Riodinidae
- Subfamily: Riodininae
- Genus: Cartea; Kirby, [1871]

Species
- See text

Synonyms
- Orestias C. & R. Felder, 1862

= Cartea =

Genus of butterflies

Cartea is a butterfly genus in the family Riodinidae. They are resident in the Neotropics.

== Species list ==
- Cartea ucayala Thieme, 1907 Peru.
- Cartea vitula (Hewitson, [1852]) Brazil.

== Sources ==
- Cartea
