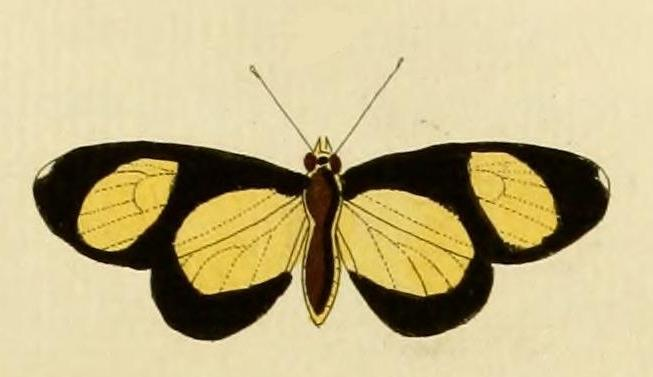

Scientific classification
- Kingdom: Animalia
- Phylum: Mollusca
- Class: Gastropoda
- Subclass: Caenogastropoda
- Order: Neogastropoda
- Family: Cancellariidae
- Genus: Chamaelimnas
- Species: C. ammon

Binomial name
- Chamaelimnas ammon (Cramer, 1777)

Synonyms
- Papilio ammon Cramer, 1777

= Chamaelimnas ammon =

Species of butterfly

Chamaelimnas ammon is a species of butterfly of the family Riodinidae. It is found in Guyana.
