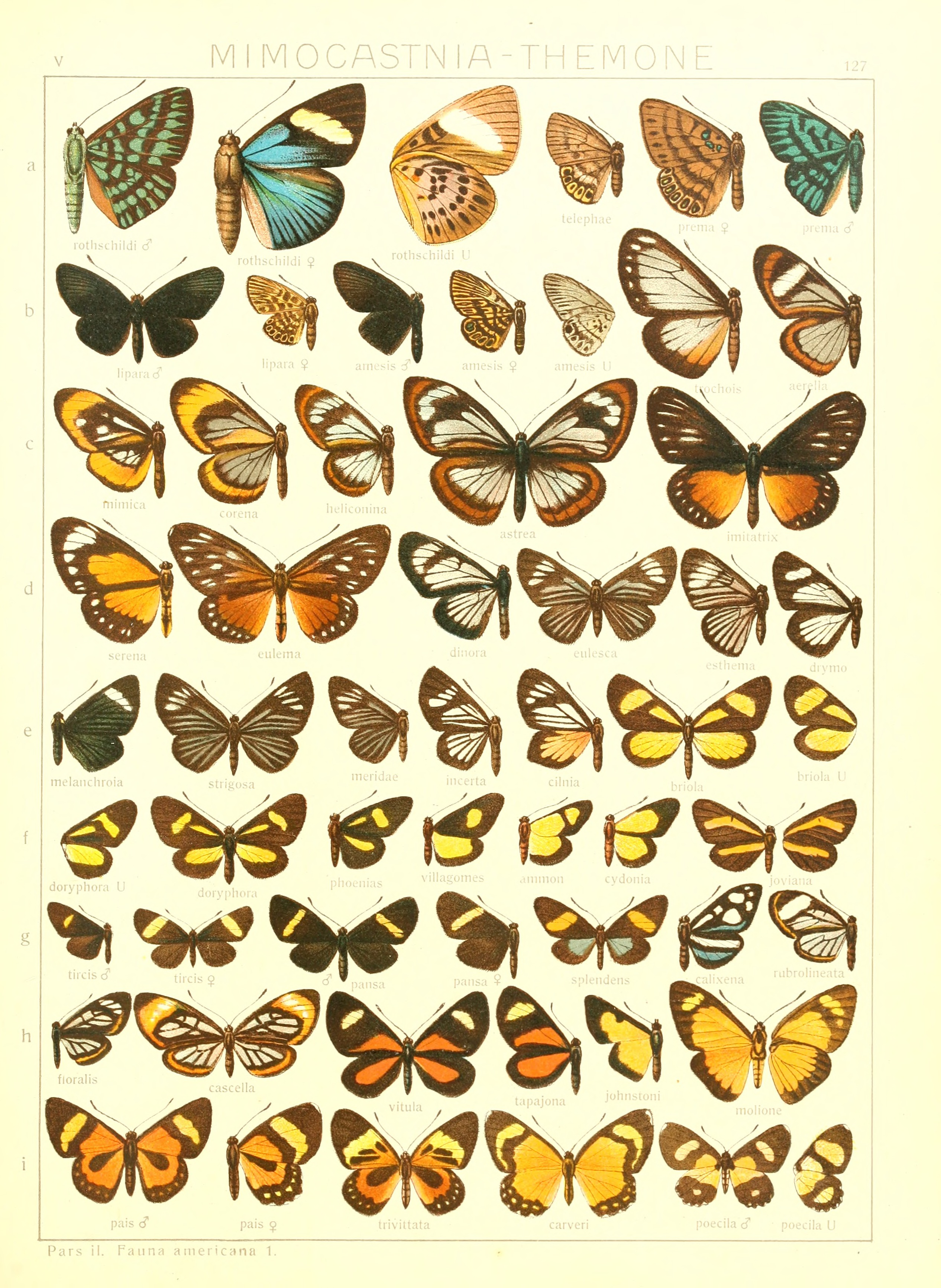
- Brachyglenis and other Riodinidae depicted in Adalbert Seitz's Die Gross-Schmetterlinge der Erde

Scientific classification
- Domain: Eukaryota
- Kingdom: Animalia
- Phylum: Arthropoda
- Class: Insecta
- Order: Lepidoptera
- Family: Riodinidae
- Subfamily: Riodininae
- Tribe: Riodinini
- Genus: Brachyglenis; C. & R. Felder, [1862]

Synonyms
- Tmetoglene C. & R. Felder, 1862; Metapheles Bates, 1866

= Brachyglenis =

Genus of butterflies

Brachyglenis is a genus in the butterfly family Riodinidae, which is found only in the Neotropical realm.

== Species ==
Six species are currently recognised:

- Brachyglenis colaxes (Hewitson, 1870)
- Brachyglenis dinora (Bates, 1866) present in Nicaragua and Colombia
- Brachyglenis dodona Godman & Salvin, 1886) present in Mexico and Panama
- Brachyglenis drymo (Godman & Salvin, 1886) present in Brazil
- Brachyglenis esthema C. & R. Felder, 1862 present in Costa Rica, Colombia, Ecuador and Peru
- Brachyglenis trichroma (Seitz, 1920)

=== References ===
- Brachyglenis sur funet
- TOL
