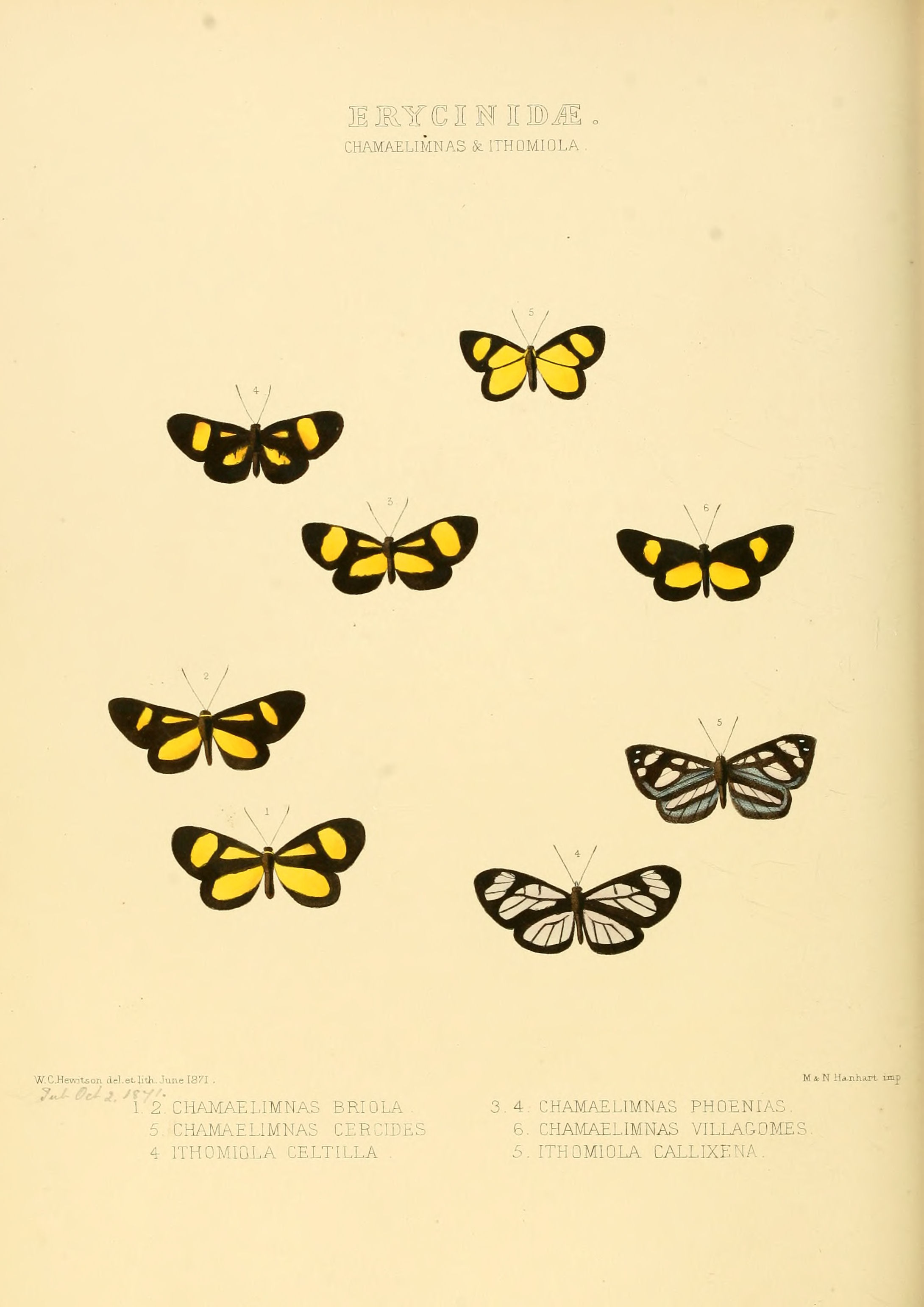
- Illustrations of Chamaelimnas and Ithomiola

Scientific classification
- Kingdom: Animalia
- Phylum: Mollusca
- Class: Gastropoda
- Subclass: Caenogastropoda
- Order: Neogastropoda
- Family: Cancellariidae
- Genus: Chamaelimnas; C. & R. Felder, [1865]

= Chamaelimnas =

Genus of butterflies

Chamaelimnas is a Neotropical metalmark butterfly genus.

== Species ==
Listed alphabetically:

- Chamaelimnas ammon (Cramer, 1777)
- Chamaelimnas briola Bates, 1868 present in Costa Rica, Colombia, French Guiana, Ecuador, Brazil, Paraguay, Argentina and Peru
- Chamaelimnas cercides Hewitson, 1871 present in Venezuela
- Chamaelimnas cydonia Stichel, 1910 present in Panama and Colombia
- Chamaelimnas joviana Schaus, 1902 present in Bolivia, Argentina and Peru
- Chamaelimnas splendens Grose-Smith, 1902 present in Bolivia
- Chamaelimnas tircis C. & R. Felder, [1865] present in Bolivia, Brazil and Peru

=== Sources ===
- Chamaelimnas at Markku Savela's website on Lepidoptera
- TOL images
