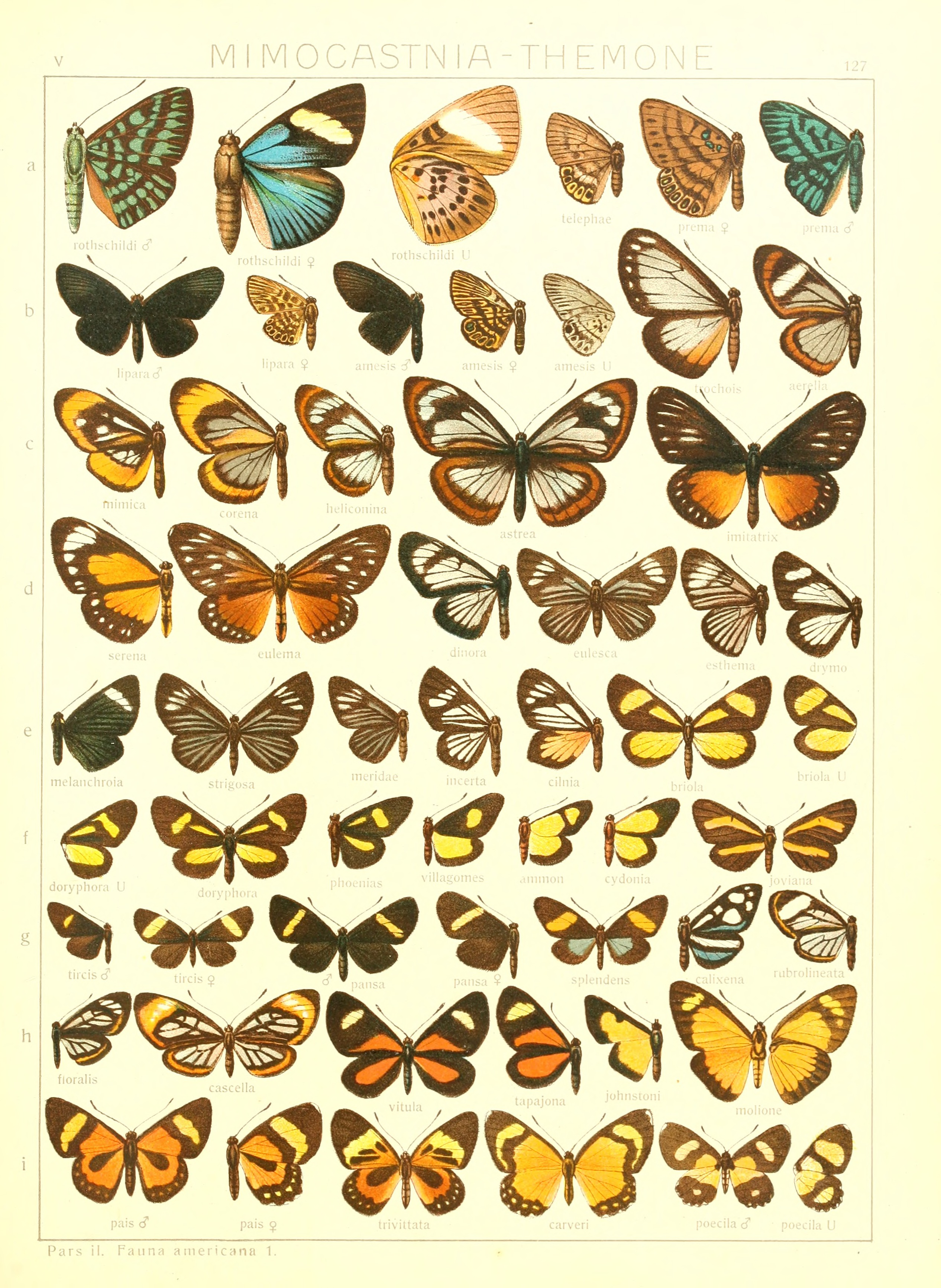

Scientific classification
- Kingdom: Animalia
- Phylum: Arthropoda
- Class: Insecta
- Order: Lepidoptera
- Family: Riodinidae
- Subfamily: Riodininae
- Genus: Themone; Westwood, 1851

= Themone =

Genus of butterflies

Themone is a genus in the butterfly family Riodinidae present only in the Neotropical realm.

== Species ==
- Themone pais (Hübner, [1820]) present in French Guiana, Guyana, Suriname, Venezuela, Brazil and Peru
- Themone poecila Bates, 1868 present in Brazil
- Themone pulcherrima (Herrich-Schäffer, [1853]) present in Suriname

== Sources ==
- Themone at Markku Savela's website on Lepidoptera
