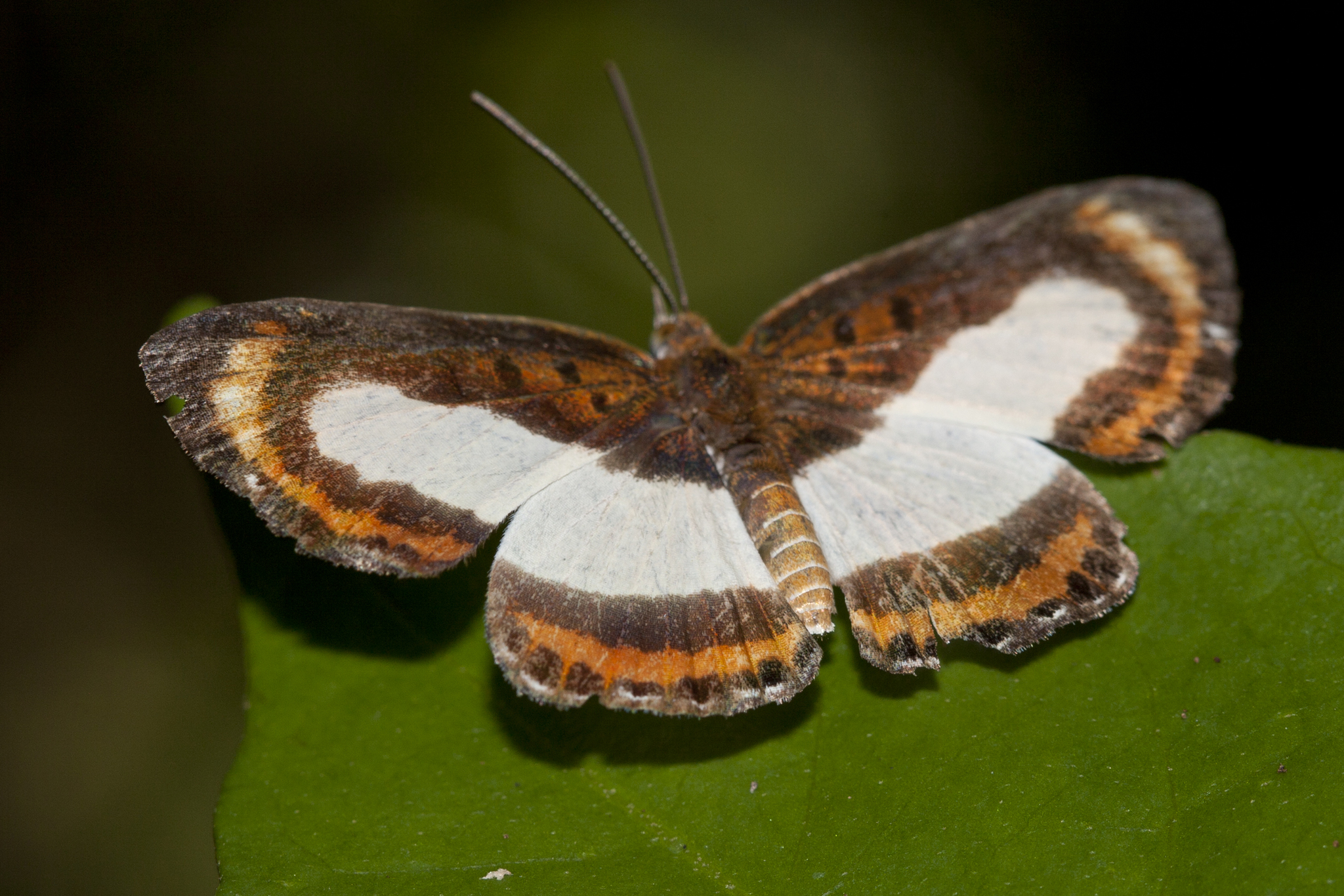

Scientific classification
- Kingdom: Animalia
- Phylum: Arthropoda
- Class: Insecta
- Order: Lepidoptera
- Family: Riodinidae
- Genus: Synargis
- Species: S. gela

Binomial name
- Synargis gela (Hewitson, 1853)

= Synargis gela =

Species of butterfly

Synargis gela is a species of butterfly from the genus Synargis in the family Riodinidae. It was originally described in 1853.
