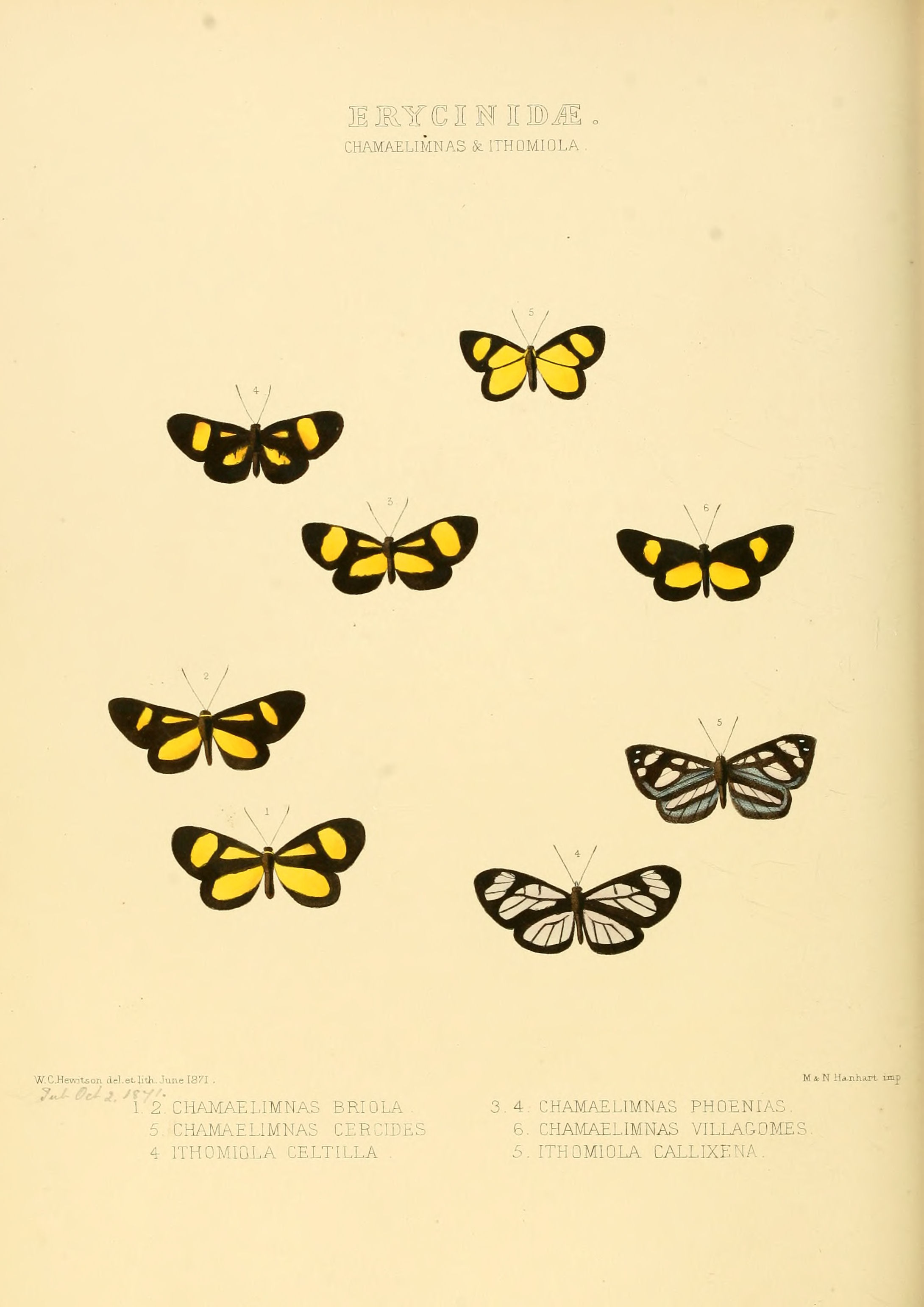
- Ithomiola figures 4, 5

Scientific classification
- Kingdom: Animalia
- Phylum: Arthropoda
- Class: Insecta
- Order: Lepidoptera
- Family: Riodinidae
- Subfamily: Riodininae
- Genus: Ithomiola; C. & R. Felder, [1865]

Synonyms
- Compsoteria Hewitson, 1870

= Ithomiola =

Genus of butterflies

Ithomiola is a butterfly genus in the butterfly family Riodinidae present only in the Neotropical realm.

== Species ==
- Ithomiola buckleyi Hall & Willmott, 1998 present in Ecuador and Peru
- Ithomiola callixena (Hewitson, 1870 present in Ecuador, Colombia and Peru
- Ithomiola cascella (Hewitson, 1870) present in Ecuador, Colombia and Peru
- Ithomiola celtilla (Hewitson, 1870) present in Ecuador
- Ithomiola floralis C. & R. Felder, [1865] present in French Guiana, Suriname and Bolivia
- Ithomiola rubrolineata Lathy, 1904 present in Peru

== Biology ==
Known as the glasswing mimic, Ithomiola floralis is protected by resembling Ithomiinae species.

=== Sources ===
- funet
