= Hans Ferdinand Emil Julius Stichel =

German entomologist

Hans Ferdinand Emil Julius Stichel (16 February 1862 – 2 October 1936, in Berlin) was a German railways officer and amateur entomologist who specialised in Lepidoptera. His son Wolfgang Stichel became an entomologist who specialised in the 'true bugs'.

== Life and work ==
Stichel was born in Wronke, Prussian Province of Posen (Wronki, Poland) and attended the Royal Realgymnasium of Berlin. In May 1882, he started to study philosophy at the Friedrich-Wilhelm University Berlin. After the death of his father he had to stop his studies in 1883 for financial reasons. Stichel then began a career as a railway civil servant becoming director of railway materials first class in 1893. In 1921, he became a higher inspector and in 1922 Director of the office in Berlin.

From 1892, he devoted his spare time to the publication of entomological reviews. In 1910, he gave the binomial name to the butterfly Eurybia elvina. From 1912 to 1923, he directed the publication of Zeitschrift für wissenschaftliche Insektenbiologie (Journal of scientific insect biology) and Neuen Beiträge zur systematischen Insektenkunde (New posts on systematic entomology). He was also the author of more than one hundred publications on insects, mainly butterflies. Stichel moreover took part in collective publications like Das Tierreich, Grossschmetterlinge der Erde, Nomenclator Animalium Generum and Subgenerum, Genera Insectorum and Catalogus Lepidopterum. He was a member of various entomological societies and received, in 1927, an honorary doctorate.

== Works ==
- Stichel, H.F.E.J. in Seitz, 1906 (Parnassius). Die Groß-Schmetterlinge der Erde. Die Groß-Schmetterlinge des palaearktischen Faunengebietes. Die palaearktischen Tagfalter, Stuttgart.
- Stichel, H.F.E.J. Lepidoptera Rhopalocera. Fam. Riodinidae. J. Wytsman Genera Insectorum 112A 1-238. J. Wytsman Brussels.(1910–11).
- Stichel, H.F.E.J. 1909 Vorarbeiten zu einer Revision der Riodinidae Grote (Erycinidae Swains.) Berl. ent. Z. 54 (1/2) : 1-48
- Stichel, H.F.E.J. 1910 Vorarbeiten zu einer Revision der Riodinidae Grote (Erycinidae Swains.) (Lep. Rhop.) Berl. ent. Z. 55 (1/2) : 9-103
- Stichel, H.F.E.J. 1911. Fam. Riodinidae. Allgemeines—Subfam. Riodininae. Genera Insectorum, 112 (B), 239–452.
- Stichel, H.F.E.J. 1928 Die Veröffentlichungen über Erycinidae von A. Seitz im Spiegelbild der Kritik. (Lep. Rhopal.). Deutsche entomologische Zeitschrift, 1928 (2), 146–160.
- Stichel, H.F.E.J. 1930 Riodinidae Lepidopterorum Catalogus 38: 1-112 (1930), 40: 113-544 (1930), 41: 545-720 (1930), 44: 721-795 (1931)
