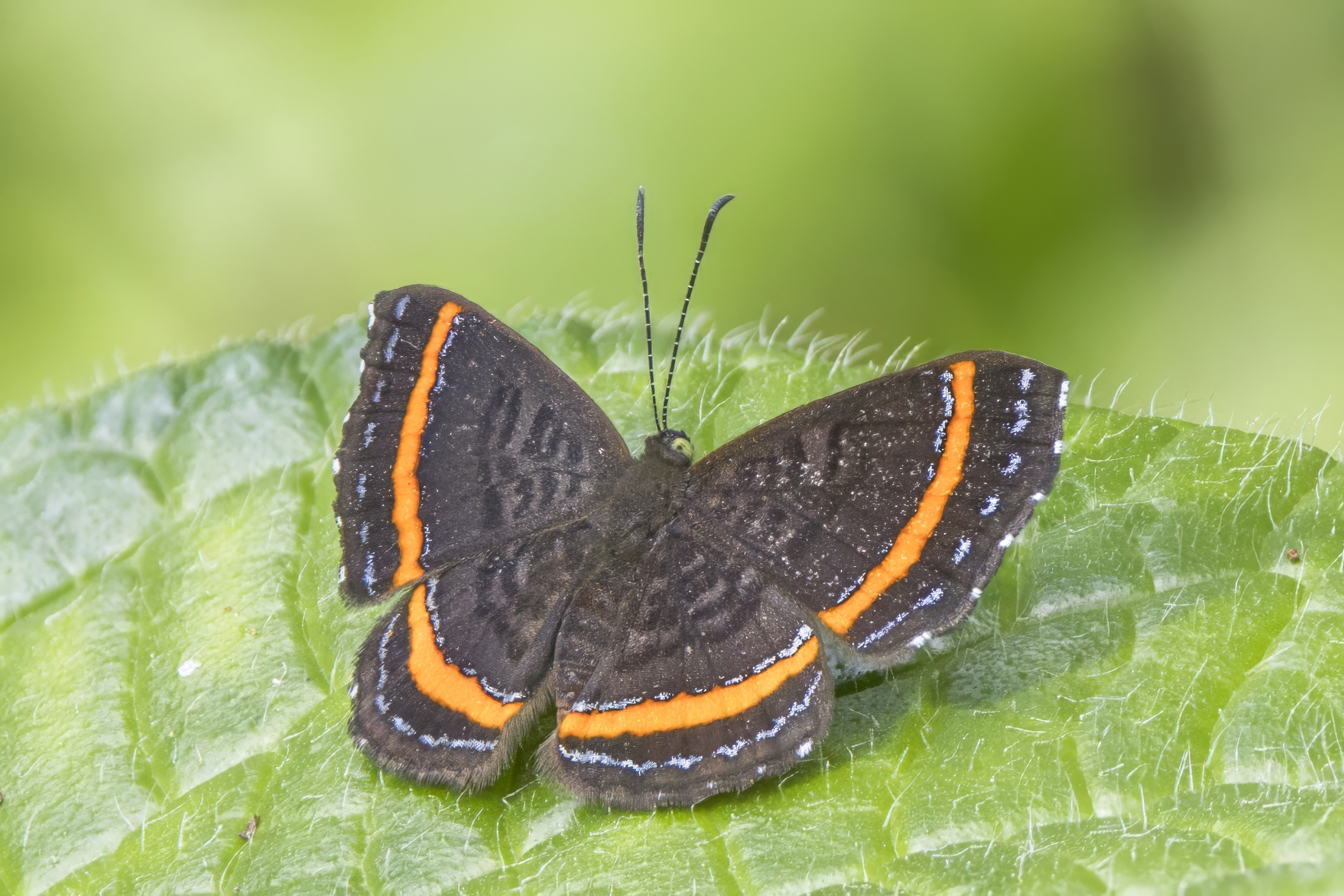
- Orange-banded gem Crocozona coecias, Ecuador

Scientific classification
- Kingdom: Animalia
- Phylum: Arthropoda
- Clade: Pancrustacea
- Class: Insecta
- Order: Lepidoptera
- Family: Riodinidae
- Subfamily: Riodininae; Grote, 1895

= Riodininae =

Subfamily of insects

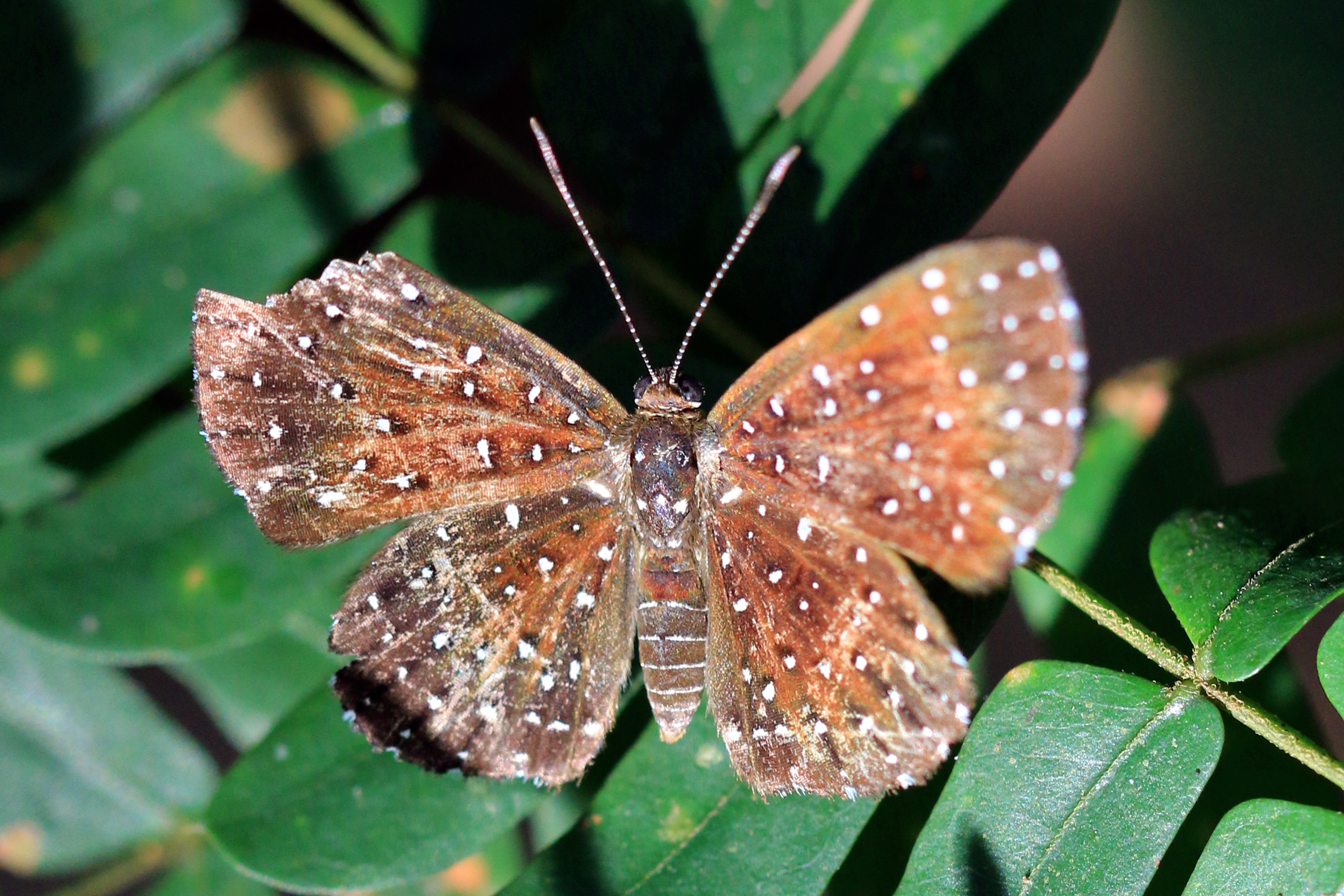
Echydna punctata, starry night Cristalino River Southern Amazon, Brazil

Riodininae is the largest of the three subfamilies within the metalmark butterfly family, Riodinidae.

== Classification ==
Riodininae contains the following tribes:

- Befrostiini Grishin, 2019
- Calydnini Seraphim, Freitas & Kaminski, 2018
- Dianesiini Seraphim, Freitas & Kaminski, 2018
- Emesidini Seraphim, Freitas & Kaminski, 2018
- Eurybiini Reuter, 1896
- Helicopini Reuter 1897
- Nymphidiini Bates, 1859
- Riodinini Grote, 1895
- Sertaniini Seraphim, Freitas & Kaminski, 2018
- Symmachiini Bates, 1859
