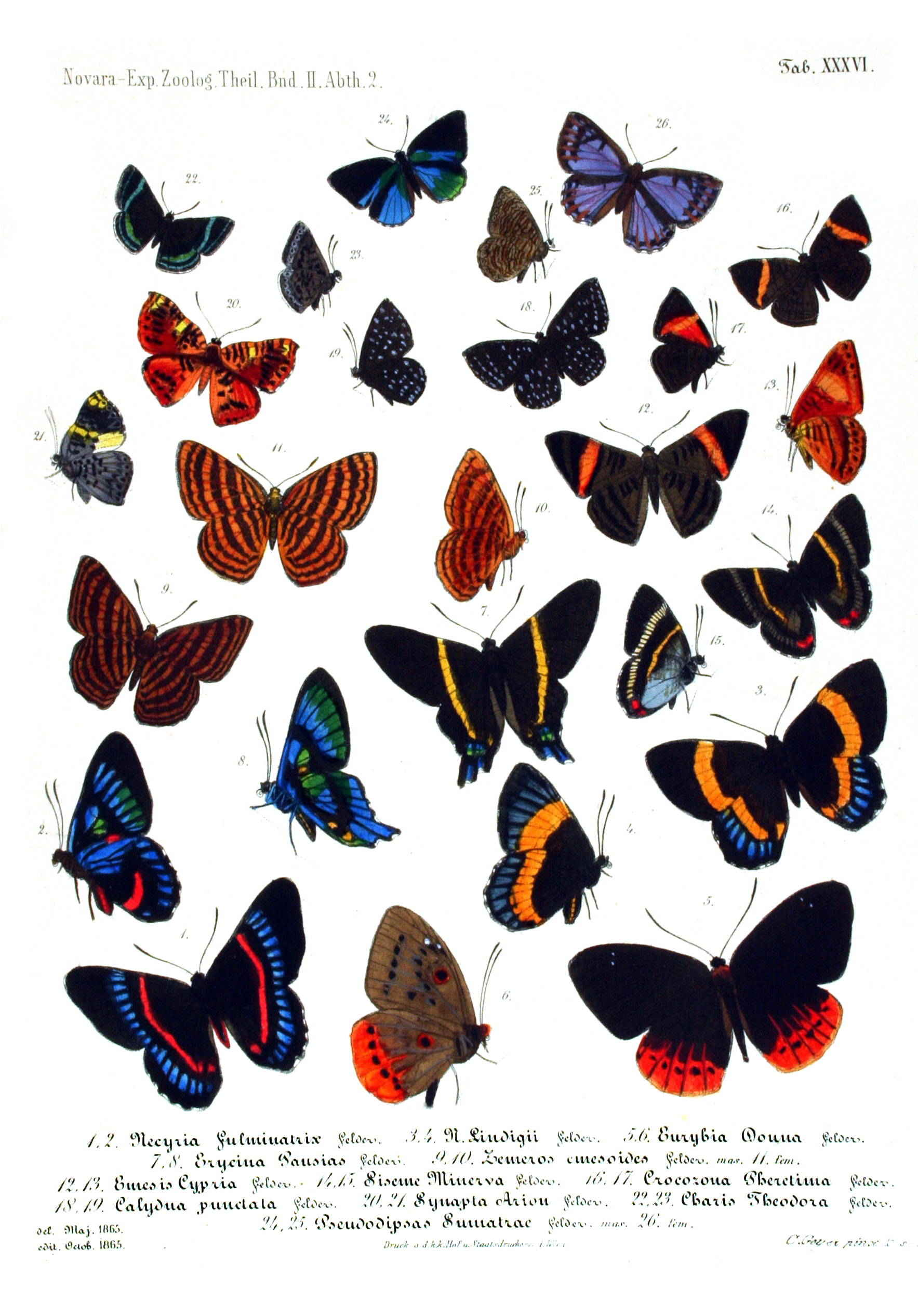
- Riodinidae, from Reise der Österreichischen Fregatte Novara um die Erde (1861–1876)

Scientific classification
- Kingdom: Animalia
- Phylum: Arthropoda
- Clade: Pancrustacea
- Class: Insecta
- Order: Lepidoptera
- Superfamily: Papilionoidea
- Family: Riodinidae; Grote, 1895

Subfamilies
- Euselasiinae; Nemeobiinae; Riodininae

= Riodinidae =

Butterfly family containing the metalmarks

Ariconias glaphyra in the Pantanal, Brazil

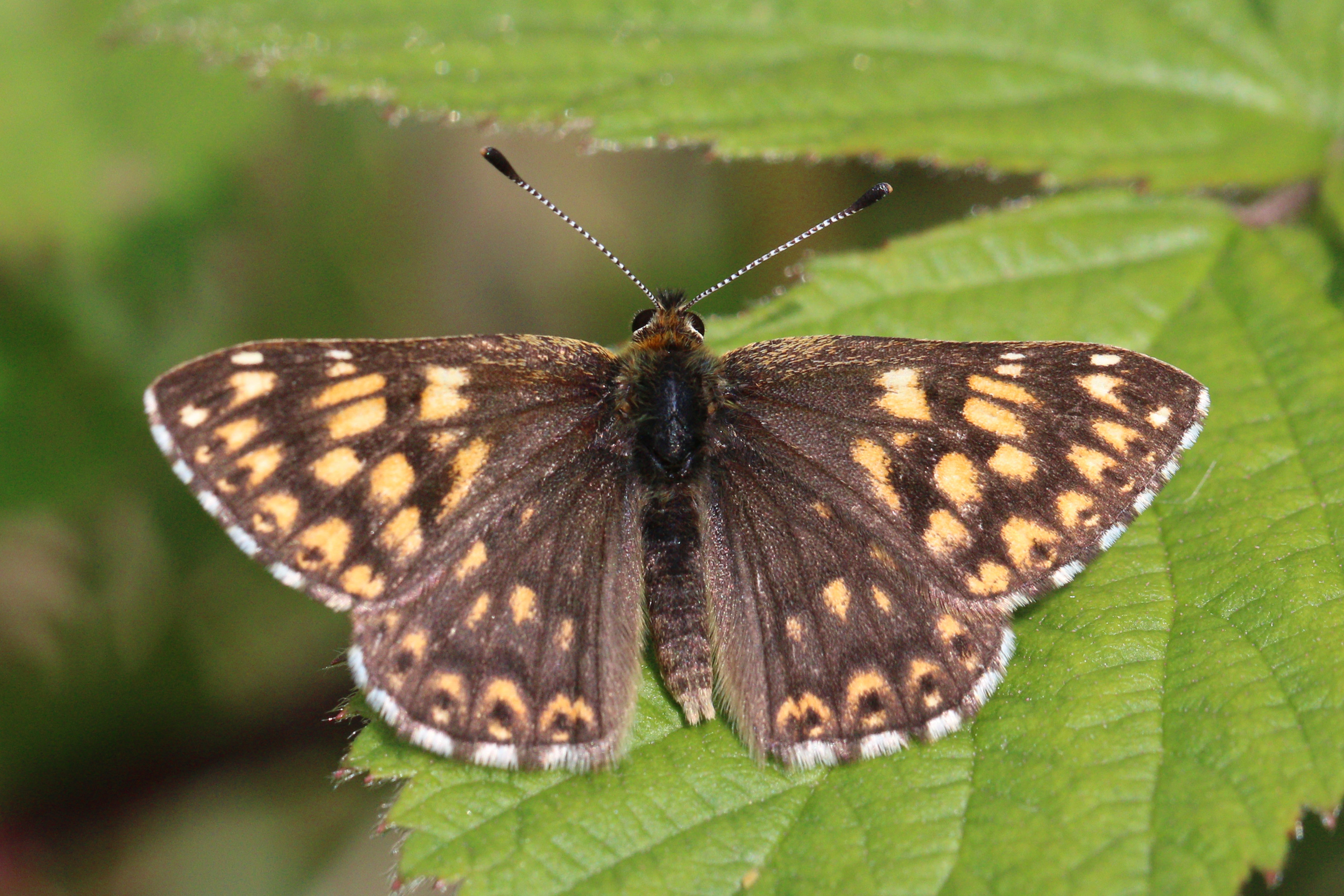
Duke of Burgundy (Hamearis lucina)

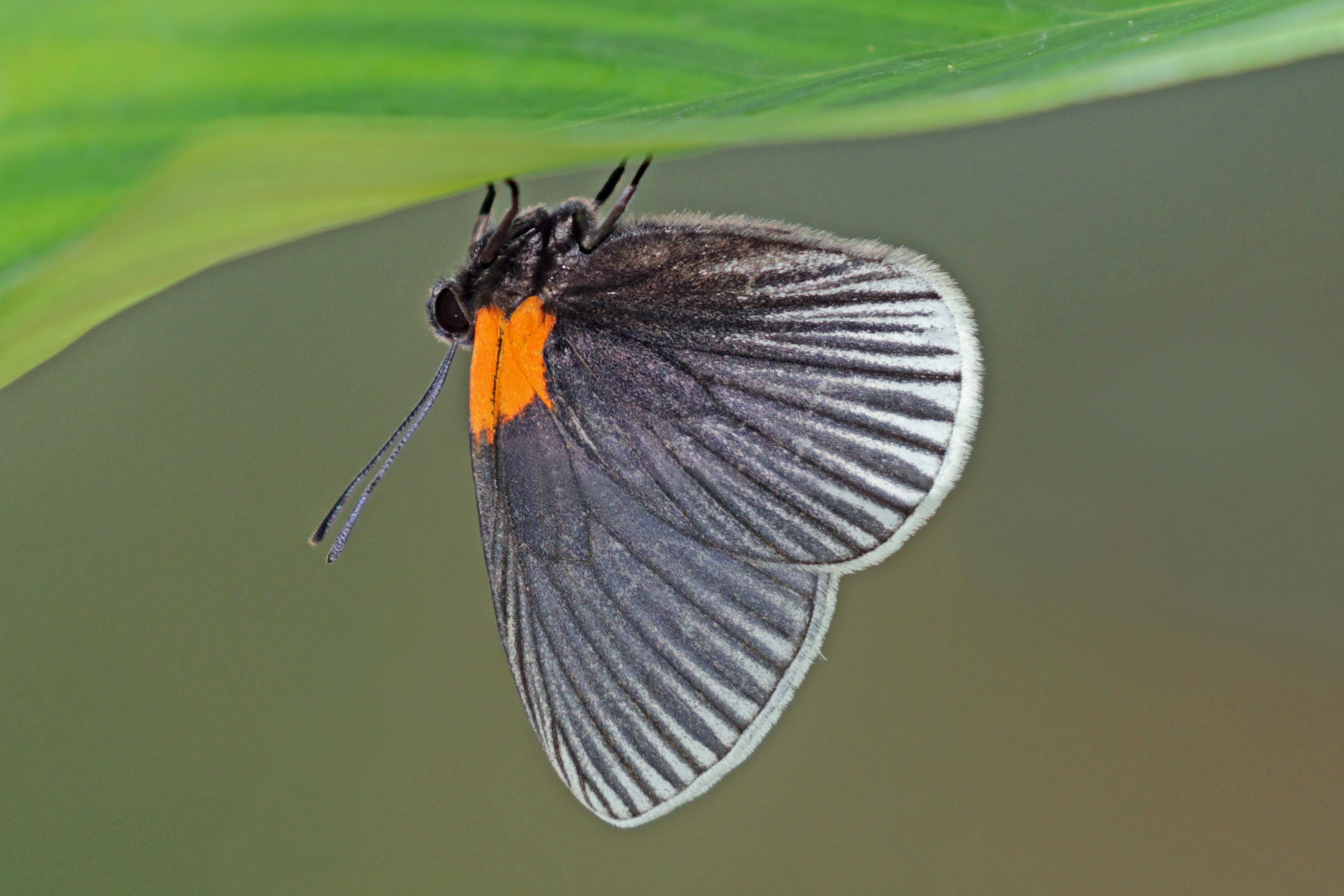
White-rayed metalmark (Hades noctula)

Riodinidae is the family of metalmark butterflies. The common name "metalmarks" refers to the small, metallic-looking spots commonly found on their wings. The 1,532 species are placed in 146 genera. Although mostly Neotropical in distribution, the family is also represented both in the Nearctic, Palearctic, Australasian (Dicallaneura), Afrotropic (Afriodinia, Saribia), and Indomalayan realms.

== Description ==
The family includes small to medium-sized species, from 12 to 60 mm wingspan, often with vibrant structural colouring. The wing shape is very different within the family. They may resemble butterflies in other groups, some are similar to Satyrinae, some are bright yellow reminiscent of Coliadinae and others (examples Barbicornis, Rhetus arcius, Helicopis, Chorinea) have tails as do Papilionidae. The colouration ranges from muted colours in the temperate zone species to iridescent blue and green wings and transparent wings in tropical species. The golden or silvery metallic spots on the wings in many species of the Americas gave them the English common name "metalmarks". A number of species mimic poisonous moths of several families and there are often extensive mimicry rings of similar-looking species, grouped around a model. Mimicry causes often closely related species to have completely different wing patterns, for example the genus Thisbe. Many species mimic the stain and stripe pattern of toxic Nymphalidae. Batesian mimicry seems to be more common than in any other insect family of similar size. Reasons for this are unknown. Another example is Ithomeis where different subspecies resemble the species they mimic in different parts of the geographic range more than they resemble each other.

The delimitation from the closely related Lycaenidae by morphological autapomorphy is difficult. The first pair of legs of the males, which arises on the prothorax, is less than half as long as the legs of the pterothorax and they are not used for walking. The individual segments of the tarsus are sometimes fused together and fused with the tibia, and the pretarsi have no claws. This feature is also found in some Lycaenidae (and also the Monotrysia), but in these the legs are always much longer. The sensory hairs on the tarsi of the female forelimbs are arranged in a group. These groups which are arranged in pairs can be found in the other taxa of the Papilionoidea. The third problematic apomorphy is the absence of the rear projections (apophyses) of the female genitalia. This feature (absence) is found as well in some species of the subfamily of Poritiinae.

In almost all Riodinidae, the coxae of the front legs are extended on males jutting out over the trochanter (only hinted at in Styx infernalis and Corrachia leucoplaga). If there are similar projections in Lycaenidae (in genera Curetis, Feniseca and Poritia), they are built differently in detail and may be, for example, dorsally convex. In addition, almost all Riodinidae in contrast to the Lycaenidae have a humeral vein in the hindwings and the costa is thickened (exceptions in the subfamily Hamearinae). The head in relation to the eyes is wider than in Lycaenidae, making the antennal bases further away from the eye. The relatively long antennae often reach half of the front wing length.

Riodinidae have an unusual variety in chromosome numbers, only some very basal groups have the number typical for butterflies (between 29 and 31) or the number characteristic of Lycaenidae (23 to 24). Numbers between 9 and 110 occur. In some cases, representatives of a morphologically indistinguishable cryptospecies have different chromosome numbers and are reproductively isolated.

== Distinguishing features ==
Like the lycaenids, the males of this family have reduced forelegs while the females have full-sized, fully functional forelegs. The foreleg of males is often reduced and has a uniquely shaped first segment (the coxa) which extends beyond its joint with the second segment, rather than meeting it flush. They have a unique venation on the hindwing: the costa of the hindwing is thickened out to the humeral angle and the humeral vein is short.

== Taxonomy and systematics ==
Riodinidae is currently treated as a distinct family within the superfamily Papilionoidea, but in the past they were held to be the subfamily Riodininae of the Lycaenidae. Earlier, they were considered to be part of the now defunct family Erycinidae, whose species are divided between this family and the subfamily Libytheinae.

Today, most systematists prefer to accept an independent family even if there are counter arguments. Based on morphological studies Ackery et al. in the manual of zoology (Kristensen 1998, cf. literature) placed Riodininae within the Lycaenidae. Kristensen et al. accepted the updating of the manual in 2007 raising the classification to family rank at least on a provisional basis.

Molecular phylogenetics (based on homologous DNA sequences) establishes a sister group relationship between the Riodinidae and the Lycaenidae accepted almost unanimously.

=== Subfamilies ===
The family Riodinidae has historically been classified using a two subfamily (Stichel, 1928) or three subfamily (Callaghan and Lamas, 2004) system. Genetic data from Seraphim et al. (2018) supports the two subfamily interpretation, with the subfamily Euselasiinae being subsumed entirely within the Old World Nemeobiinae.

Two subfamily model (Stichel, 1928)

- Nemeobiinae
- Riodininae

Three subfamily model (Callaghan and Lamas, 2004)

- Euselasiinae
- Nemeobiinae
- Riodininae

The fossil genus Lithopsyche is sometimes placed here but sometimes within the Lycaenidae.

== Biology ==
Species occur in a variety of habitats, but have a unique distribution focus in the tropical rain forests of South America. Many species are rarely found and have a relatively small distribution area. Species of the genus Charis were therefore used to reconstruct the history of the forest of the Amazon basin: each of the 19 species has a vicariant distribution area, three originally separate forests (upper, lower Amazonas, Guyana) can be derived from the relationship between the species.

The food plants for the caterpillars total more than 40 plant families. Mostly young leaves or flowers are used, and rarely fallen, dead leaves or lichen are eaten. The larvae feed mostly individually not gregariously. However, gregarious caterpillars are found within the Euselasiinae (Euselasia), Riodinini (Melanis) and Emesini (Emesis), with some species demonstrating processionary behaviours. Available evidence from Euselasia and Hades suggests the gregarious trait may be widespread among members of the subfamily Euselasiinae.

The larva of Setabis lagus (Riodininae: Nymphidiini), is predatory. There are records of predation on larvae of Horiola species (family Membracidae) as well as scale insects (Coccidae). Predatory feeding has also been shown in Alesa amesis. A number of species associate with and are protected by ants during one or more stages of their life cycle.

A study in Ecuador based on adult male feeding records for 124 species in 41 genera of Riodinidae (out of a total of 441 species in 85 genera collected in the study) demonstrated that rotting fish and other carrion was the most frequently used food source in terms of numbers of individuals and taxa, attracting 89 species from 32 genera. Other food substrates visited in this study included flowers, damp sand or mud-puddling.

== Life cycle ==
The eggs vary in shape, but often appear round and flattened, some have the shape of a dome or turban. They are similar to the eggs of the Lycaenidae. The caterpillars are usually hairy and plump, and are the common overwintering stage. The caterpillars are usually longer than those of the Lycaenidae except in the myrmecophilous species. Pupae are hairy and attached with silk to either the host plant or to ground debris or leaf litter. No cocoon is seen.

Several genera of Riodinidae have evolved intimate associations with ants, and their larvae are tended and defended by ant associates. This also is the case with several lineages of Lycaenidae and contributed to arguments for the uniting the two families. It is now recognized that myrmecophily arose several times among Riodinidae and Lycaenidae clades.

Like their sister family Lycaenidae, numerous species of Riodinidae are myrmecophiles (involving about 280 ant species). The larvae of many species have special organs, which have a soothing or tempting effect on ants. Many Riodinidae larvae have so-called "tentacle nectary organs" on the eighth segment of the abdomen that secrete a fluid which is eaten by ants. Other tentacle organs on the third thoracic segment have been shown to emit allomones which influence ants. Studies suggest caterpillar acoustic signals are used to enhance their symbioses with ants (see singing caterpillars). The location of riodinid organs that function in caterpillar-ant symbioses differs from those found in the Lycaenidae, suggesting that the organs in these two families of butterflies are not homologous in origin.

=== Food plants ===
The larvae feed on plants of the families Araceae, Asteraceae, Bromeliaceae, Bombacaceae, Cecropiaceae, Clusiaceae, Dilleniaceae, Euphorbiaceae, Fabaceae, Lecythidaceae, Loranthaceae, Malpighiaceae, Marantaceae, Melastomataceae, Myrtaceae, Orchidaceae, Rubiaceae, Sapindaceae, Zingiberaceae as well as bryophytes and lichens.

== Economic significance ==
The importance of Riodinidae species considered pests is very low. Some species of Euselasiinae feed on Myrtaceae of economic importance such as guava. A few Riodininae are specified as harmful to farmed Bromeliaceae or Orchidaceae.
