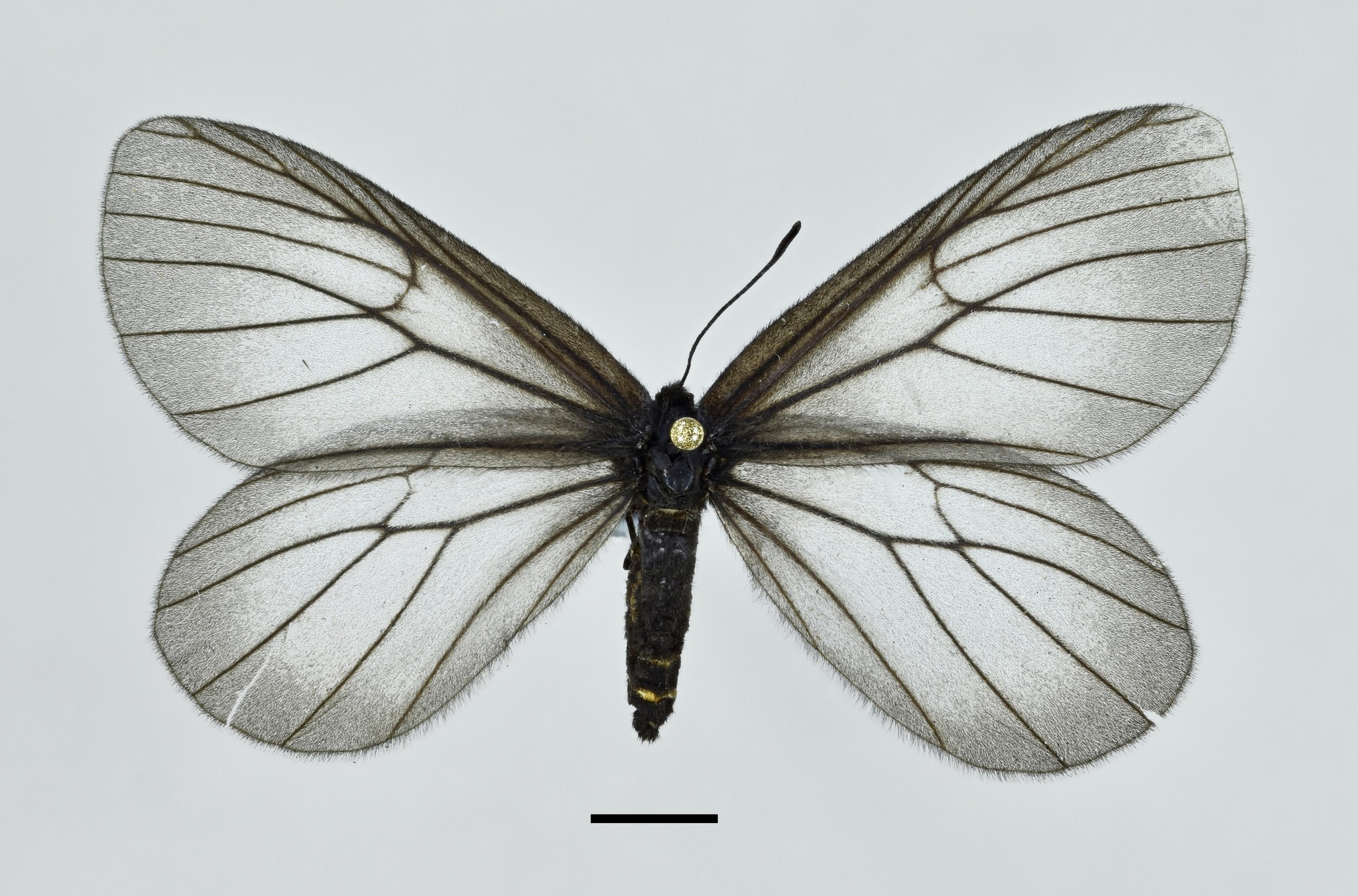

Scientific classification
- Kingdom: Animalia
- Phylum: Arthropoda
- Class: Insecta
- Order: Lepidoptera
- Family: Riodinidae
- Subfamily: Nemeobiinae
- Tribe: Nemeobiini
- Subtribe: Nemeobiina
- Genus: Styx; Staudinger, 1875
- Species: S. infernalis

Binomial name
- Styx infernalis Staudinger, 1875

= Styx infernalis =

Species of butterfly

Styx is a monotypic genus of butterflies in the metalmark family Riodinidae. It consists of one species, Styx infernalis, described by Otto Staudinger in 1875. It is endemic to Peru, where it inhabits tropical montane cloud forests between the elevations of 1000-1600 meters.

The genus Styx has had a complicated taxonomic history. Initially identified as a moth, it has been reclassified numerous times into several different butterfly families, and once occupying its own distinct family as "Stygidae" before ultimately being classified into the subfamily Nemeobiinae in the family Riodinidae, a classification that has been supported by both morphological and genetic evidence. This makes Styx one of only a few New World representatives of a nearly entirely Old World subfamily. Styx has been referred to as both a "missing link" and a "living fossil" due to its indeterminate taxonomic nature and unique morphological characteristics.

== Description ==
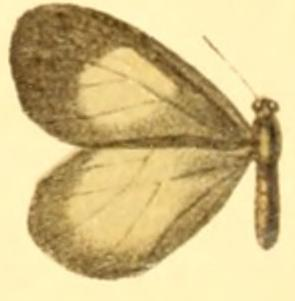
An illustration of Styx infernalis from Adalbert Seitz's The Macrolepidoptera of the World

Styx infernalis is a medium sized, translucent winged, brown veined, and gray-colored butterfly. The cloudy grayish white color of the wings darkens towards the outer edge. Its wing coloration has been described as resembling isinglass. Its wings are narrow, with short antennae, and it has a stout black-colored body which resembles to a Geometrid or Lymantriid moth. The butterflies have been noted to resemble smaller versions of Parnassius butterflies. Patterning akin to Styx have been observed in the butterfly genera Parnassius, Aporia, and Davidina.

Staudinger's original description of specimens he had obtained in Chanchamayo states that the butterfly had a wingspan of 46-49 millimeters.

The male's forelegs lacked pretarsal claws and exhibits less than five tarsomeres. In the males, the foretarsus is severely reduced, being half the size of the pterothoracic legs. The females have centrally clustered trichoid sensillae on the foretarsus, a feature shared with the Old World butterfly genus Laxita. Additionally, they lacked the apophyses posteriores on the female genitalia. These morphological differences served as justification for the reclassification of S. infernalis into the Riodinidae.

== Life history ==
Styx infernalis has a fairly little known life history. In an unpublished paper by Hall et al., the larvae lack spathulate setae, a feature that is present on larvae of the subfamily Euselasiinae. Akin to other Nemeobiines, the larvae feed on members of the family Primulaceae, in this case the plant genus Myrsine.

=== Behavior ===
Adults are active during the midday near sunny patches, they often engage in mud-puddling near streams. The adult's flight is weak, and appear like they are gliding in the air. There have been reports by Purser (2007) that it is possibly nocturnal. Due to their severely reduced forelimbs, it is unlikely that adult males use them for movement, akin to Nymphalid butterflies.

== Taxonomic history ==
Styx infernalis has had a fraught taxonomic history, being reclassified within four separate butterfly families; Pieridae, Erycinidae, Lycaenidae, and Riodinidae, following its initial description by Staudinger in 1875. Erycinidae as a family was later split in two, with the Riodinids, including Styx, being placed within the family Lycaenidae.

In Staudinger's original description of the butterfly, he classified Styx as a member of the family Pieridae; however, he had initially mistaken the butterfly for a moth. It was later moved to the family Erycinidae due to its morphological characteristics. In particular, its antennae, which had set it apart from other Pierids. Structural differences with regards to the thorax, legs, wing venation, and eggs warranted reclassification out of the family Pieridae.

Harvey (1987) justified the genus Styx as belonging within the Erycinidae (now known as Riodinidae) citing morphological differences. It was formerly considered as part of the subfamily Styginae, within the Lycaenidae, with the genus Styx its sole member by Ehrlich (1958) and Scott (1985). Ehrlich had considered the Styginae at equal rank to the (at the time) tribe Riodininae. When the family was classified as subfamily Riodininae within the Lycaenidae, it occupied the tribe Stygini. It had also been classified as its own separate family in its own right, the Stygidae (Eliot, 1973).

Harvey (1987) proposed that Styx belonged within the family Riodinidae. Robbins (1988) used a scanning electron microscope to highlight morphological differences with regards to the forelimbs to corroborate upon Harvey's proposed placement. Wahlberg et al. (2005) used DNA evidence to further solidify its proposed placement within the family Riodinidae.

Within the family, Styx was initially classified within the subfamily Euselasiinae, tribe Corrachiini due to biogeographical reasons rather than morphological means. This classification eventually fell through in favor of placement within the subfamily Nemeobiinae, a primarily Old World subfamily, despite the New World distribution Styx exhibits. Styx was surmised to be derived taxa from the Nemeobiine subfamily, where most other Nemeobiines had crossed the Bering Strait land bridge. Styx was most closely related to the genus Corrachia, another monotypic Riodinid from Costa Rica. Their inclusion within the subfamily Nemeobiinae thus made the subfamily monophyletic, and were sister taxa to the Old World genus Zemeros. Genetic studies by Wahlberg (2005), Heikkila (2012), and Saunders (2010) consistently placed Styx as being closely placed with Hamearis in studies with sparse Riodinid sampling.

Brown (1993) considers Styx infernalis as one of the most primitive Riodinids. Vane-Wright corroborates upon this idea, describing the butterfly as a "living fossil" akin to the Papilionid Baronia brevicornis of Mexico. It had been previously thought to be a "missing link" between the butterfly families Lycaenidae, Riodinidae, and Nymphalidae.

== Distribution ==
Styx infernalis is native to central and southern Peru. It is distributed over a small area in a region with high species diversity.

=== Habitat ===
Styx infernalis inhabits elevations between 1000 and 1600 meters. S. infernalis inhabits the tropical montane cloud forests or the Peruvian Yungas of central and southern Peru.

== Conservation ==
The butterfly is currently unranked by the IUCN. Brown (1993) lists the species as "Vulnerable". It is distributed over a very small area and is rarely seen. There have been little studies in relocating the butterfly for scientific purposes. Brown highlighted the importance of conservation of its native habitat by securing tracts of its native cloud forest habitat and stressed the importance of locating colonies.

=== Threats ===
The primary threat to Styx infernalis is habitat degradation by coffee plantations and other types of plantation developments in its native habitat.

== Etymology ==
Otto Staudinger's original rationale for naming the genus Styx was because that the butterfly "[seemed] to have come from the underworld" rather than resembling the colorful tropical vegetation that had surrounded it. Thus he had named it after the River Styx, with the specific name infernalis meaning "infernal" or "nether". Staudinger wrote in his first description of the genus Styx published in Neue Lepidopteren des südamerikanischen Faunengebiets: "eher aus der Unterwelt zu stammen scheint als aus der prachtvollen Tropenvegetation".
