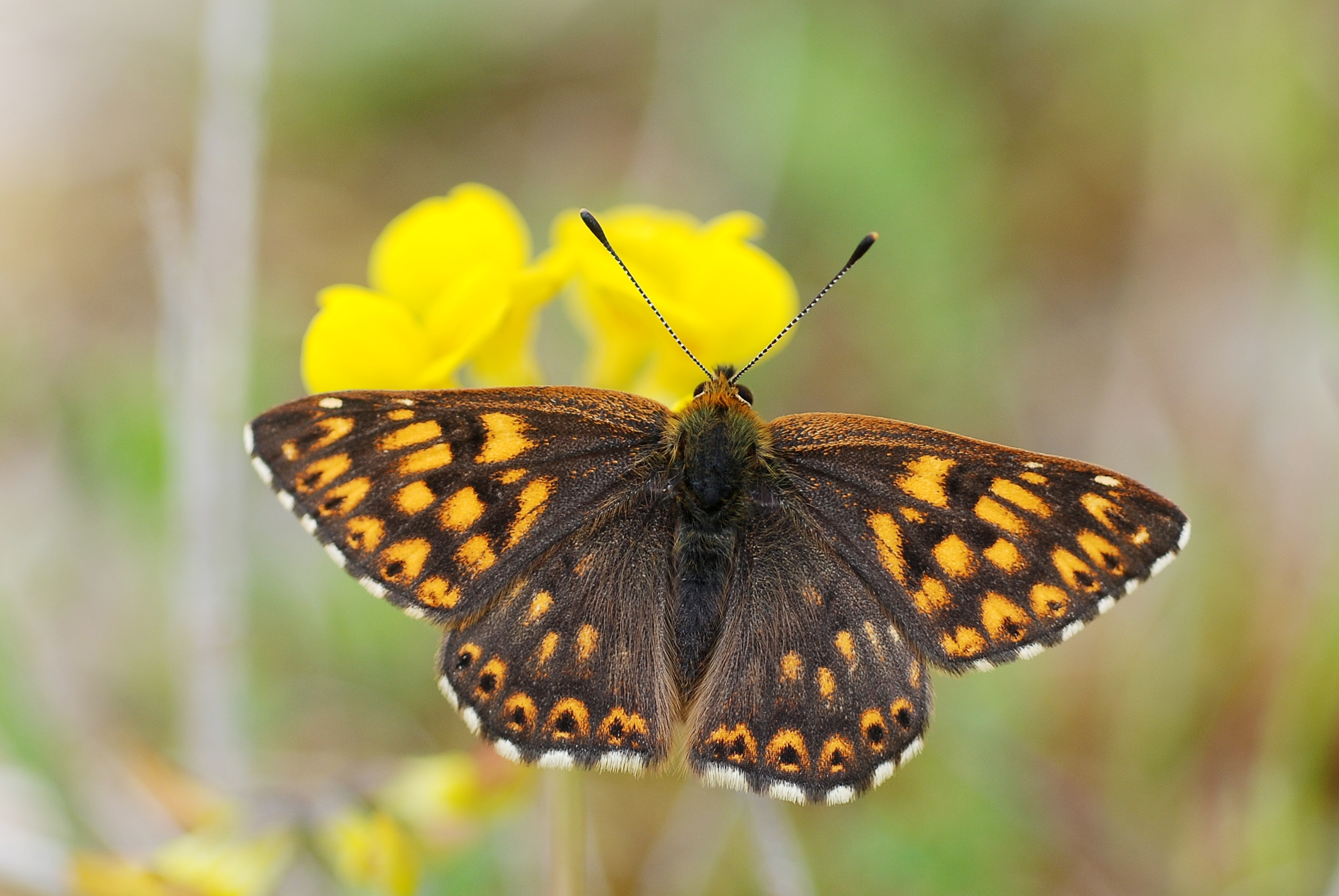
- Hamearis lucina

Scientific classification
- Kingdom: Animalia
- Phylum: Arthropoda
- Class: Insecta
- Order: Lepidoptera
- Family: Riodinidae
- Subfamily: Nemeobiinae; Bates, 1868

Synonyms
- Hamearinae Clench, 1955

= Nemeobiinae =

Subfamily of insects

Nemeobiinae is a subfamily of Riodinidae, the metalmark family. The subfamily's members consist entirely of Old World members of the Riodinid family. Recent revisions to the subfamily have begun to include members located within the New World as well, however, the subfamily continues to encompass the entirety of the Old World Riodinids.

The subfamily are the only Riodinids that feed exclusively on members of the plant family Primulaceae, being the only Riodinids to do so, with the exception of Emesis diogenia.

== Distribution ==
The Nemeobiinae was erected to encompass the entirety of the 7 percent of Riodinids that reside within the Old World. This has remained true, however, recent studies have placed the New World subfamily of Euselasiinae within the Nemeobiinae, with Corrachia and Styx believed to be apomorphic Nemeobiines. The greater Riodinid family is believed to have evolved in the Neotropics and migrated to the Old World through the Bering land bridge during the Oligocene.

Of the Old World members of the Nemeobiinae, encompassing around 13 genera and 110 species, the majority (60 species) are concentrated in the Indomalayan realm of Southeast Asia. The remainder are found within the Afrotropical realm with 15 species, the Australasian realm with 28 (Praetaxila), and 1 species found in Europe (Hamearis). A single member of the subfamily exists on the continent of Australia, Praetaxila segecia. While most members of the Nemeobiinae are found within the tropics, a handful are found within temperate areas (Hamearis, Polycaena and Takashia).

== Genera ==
The Nemeobiinae have been fraught with revision and uncertainty throughout its entire existence. Seraphim et al. (2018) proposes through genetic analysis that the subfamily is split into two tribes, and the family would encompass members of the New World subfamily Euselasiinae as tribe Euselasiini within the Nemeobiinae, while Corrachia and Styx would be moved to the Nemeobiina. The following list follows from the revised classification by Seraphim et al. (2018).

Tribe: Nemeobiini Bates, 1868

Subtribe: Abisarina

- Abisara C. Felder & R. Felder, 1865
- Afriodinia D'Abrera, 2009
- Archigenes Fruhstorfer, 1914
- Dicallaneura Butler, 1867
- Laxita Butler, 1879
- Paralaxita Eliot, 1978
- Praetaxila Fruhstorfer, 1914
- Saribia Butler, 1878
- Sibosia Espeland, Huang & Inayoshi, 2024
- Taxila Doubleday, 1847

Subtribe: Nemeobiina

- Corrachia Schaus, 1913
- Dodona Hewitson, 1861
- Hamearis Hübner, 1819
- Polycaena Staudinger, 1886
- Spitosa Espeland, Huang & Inayoshi, 2024
- Stiboges Butler, 1876
- Styx Staudinger, 1876
- Takashia Okano & Okano, 1985
- Zemeros Boisduval, 1836

Tribe: Euselasiini

See the Euselasiinae article for further information.

- Euselasia Hübner, 1819
- Hades Westwood, 1851
- Methone E. Doubleday, 1847
