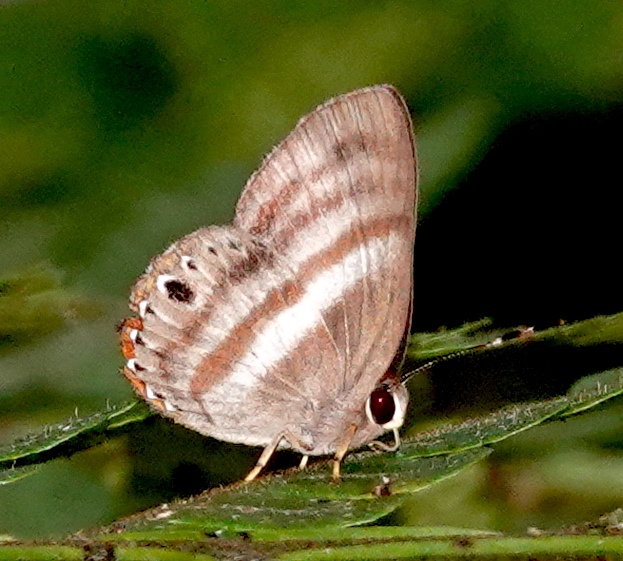
- Pelolasia melaphaea, Colombia

Scientific classification
- Kingdom: Animalia
- Phylum: Arthropoda
- Class: Insecta
- Order: Lepidoptera
- Family: Riodinidae
- Subfamily: Euselasiinae
- Genus: Pelolasia; Grishin, 2021

= Pelolasia =

Genus of butterflies

Pelolasia is a genus of metalmarks in the butterfly family Riodinidae. There are about 25 described species in Pelolasia, found in Mexico, Central America, and South America.

Pelolasia was proposed as a new genus in 2021, formed with species primarily from the genera Eurygona and Euselasia.

== Species ==
These species belong to the genus Pelolasia:

- Pelolasia amphidecta (Godman & Salvin, 1878) (Glossed Euselasia) (Central and South America)
- Pelolasia argentea (Hewitson, 1871) (Orange-spotted Euselasia) Chiapas, Mexico, to Panama)
- Pelolasia artos (Herrich-Schäffer, 1853) (South America)
- Pelolasia aurantia (A. Butler & H. Druce, 1872) (Bright-centered Euselasia) (Costa Rica to Colombia))
- Pelolasia bettina (Hewitson, 1869) (Black-topped Euselasia) (Nicaragua to Ecuador))
- Pelolasia candaria (H. Druce, 1904)
- Pelolasia cataleuca (R. Felder, 1869) (Black-edged Euselasia) (southeastern Mexico, Belize, Honduras)
- Pelolasia chrysippe (H. Bates, 1866) (Golden Euselasia) (Mexico to Colombia)
- Pelolasia euboea (Hewitson, 1853) (South America)
- Pelolasia eumedia (Hewitson, 1853) (South America)
- Pelolasia eumenes (Hewitson, 1853)
- Pelolasia eupatra (Seitz, 1916)
- Pelolasia eusepus (Hewitson, 1853) (Eusepus Euselasia) (Panama to southern Brazil)
- Pelolasia fervida (A. Butler, 1874) (South America)
- Pelolasia hahneli (Staudinger, 1887)
- Pelolasia ignitus (Stichel, 1924)
- Pelolasia leucophryna (Schaus, 1913) (Glowing Euselasia) (Honduras, Costa Rica)
- Pelolasia mazaca (Hewitson, 1860)
- Pelolasia melaphaea (Hübner, 1823) (South America)
- Pelolasia mirania (H. Bates, 1868)
- Pelolasia nytua (J. Hall & Willmott, 2009)
- Pelolasia pellonia (Stichel, 1919) (South America)
- Pelolasia pelor (Hewitson, 1853)
- Pelolasia rubrocilia (Lathy, 1926) (South America)
- Pelolasia seitzi (Lathy, 1926) (South America)

== Gallery ==
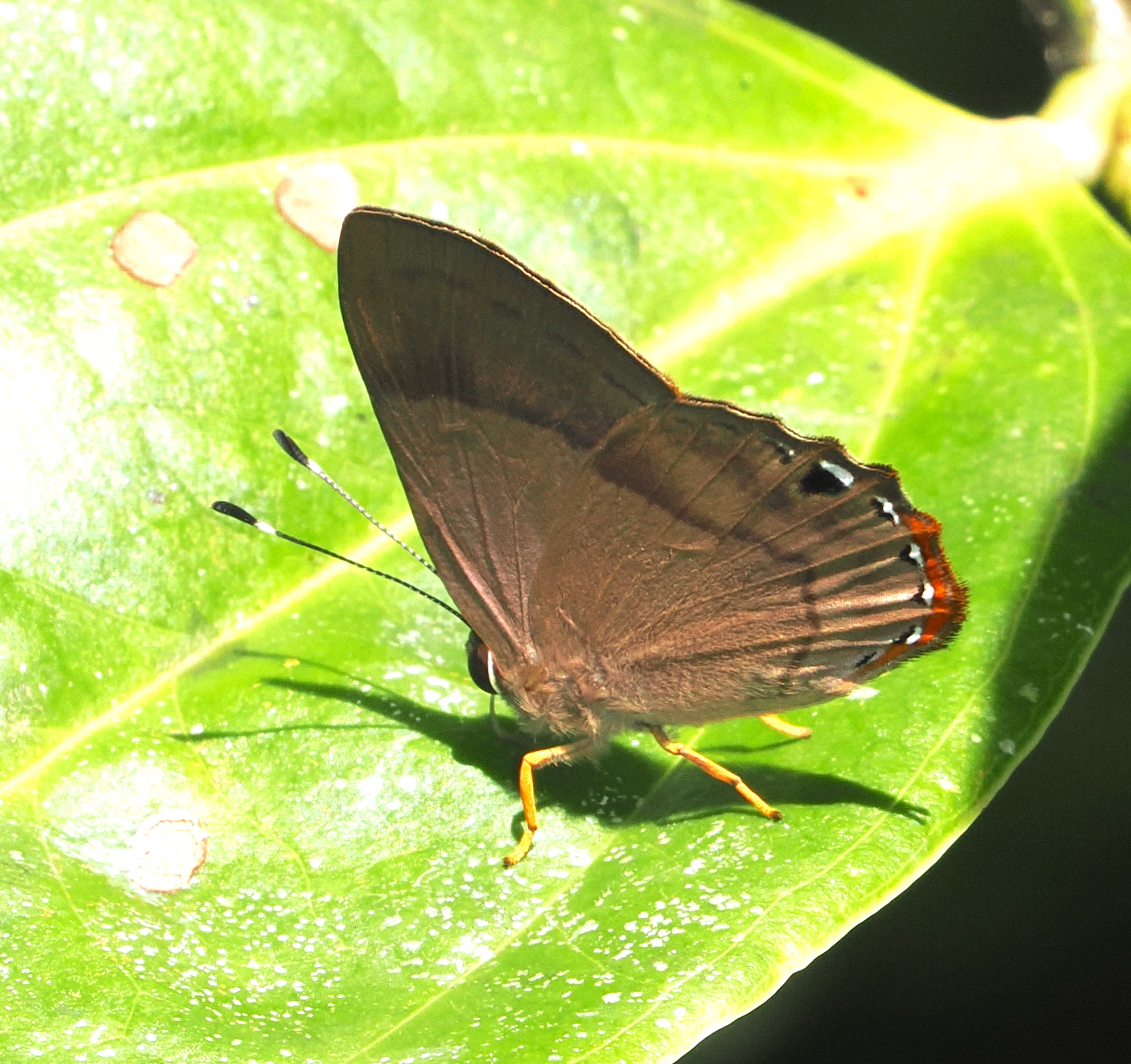
Pelolasia amphidecta, Glossed Euselasia, Colombia

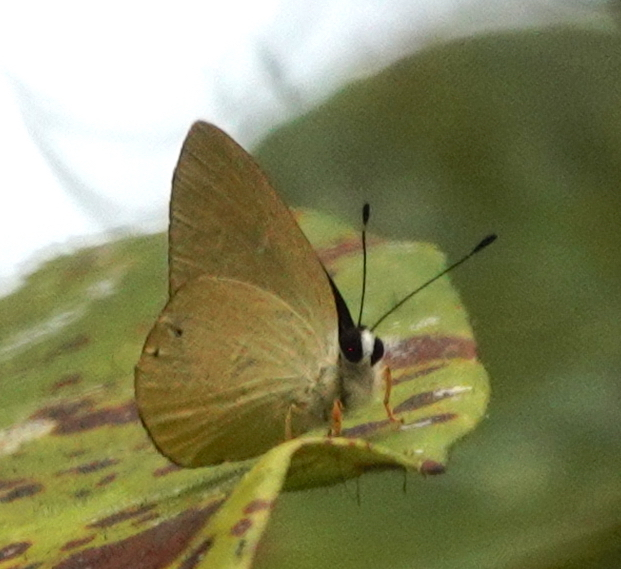
Pelolasia bettina, Black-topped Euselasia, Colombia

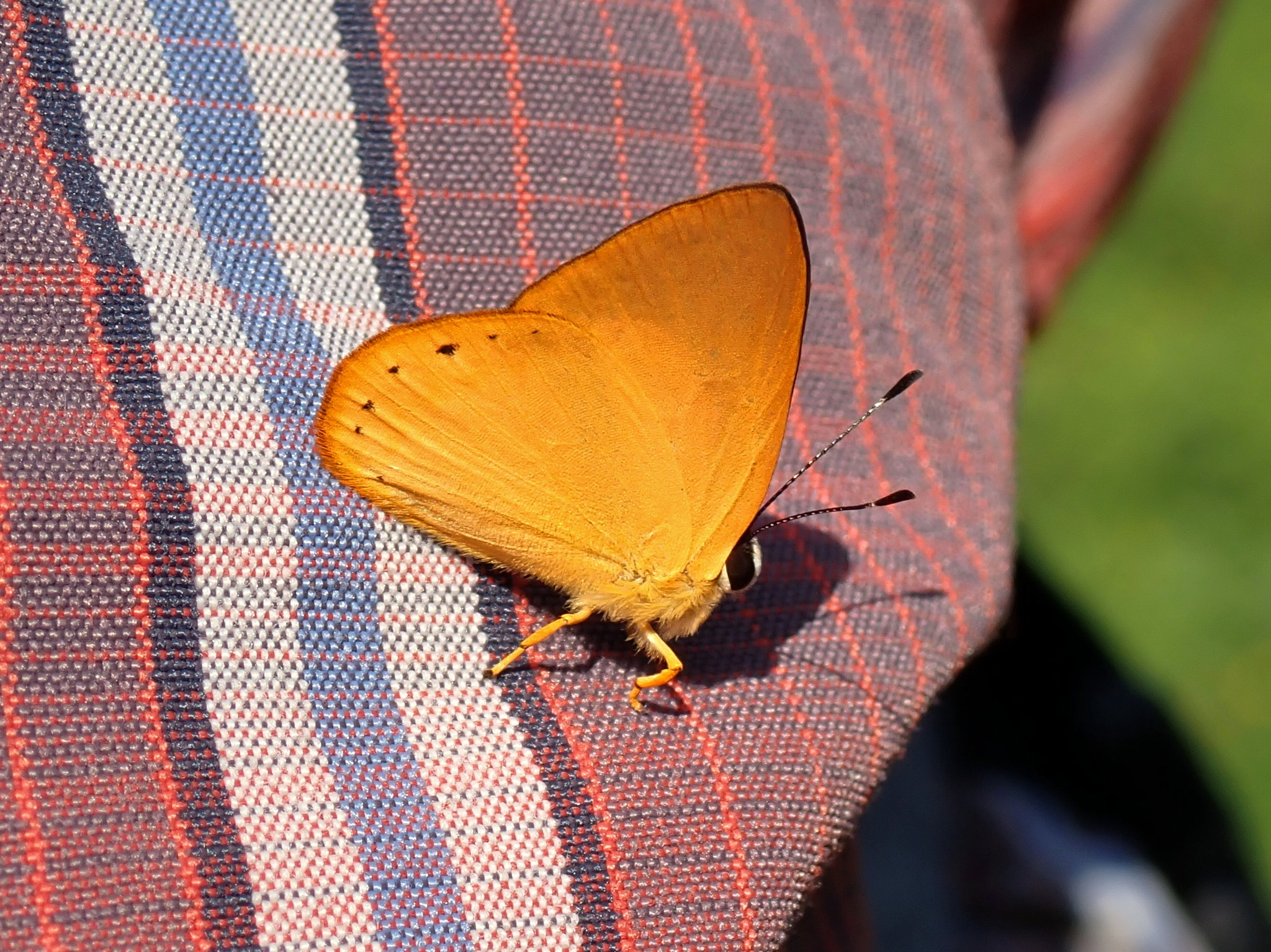
Pelolasia chrysippe, Golden Euselasia, Honduras

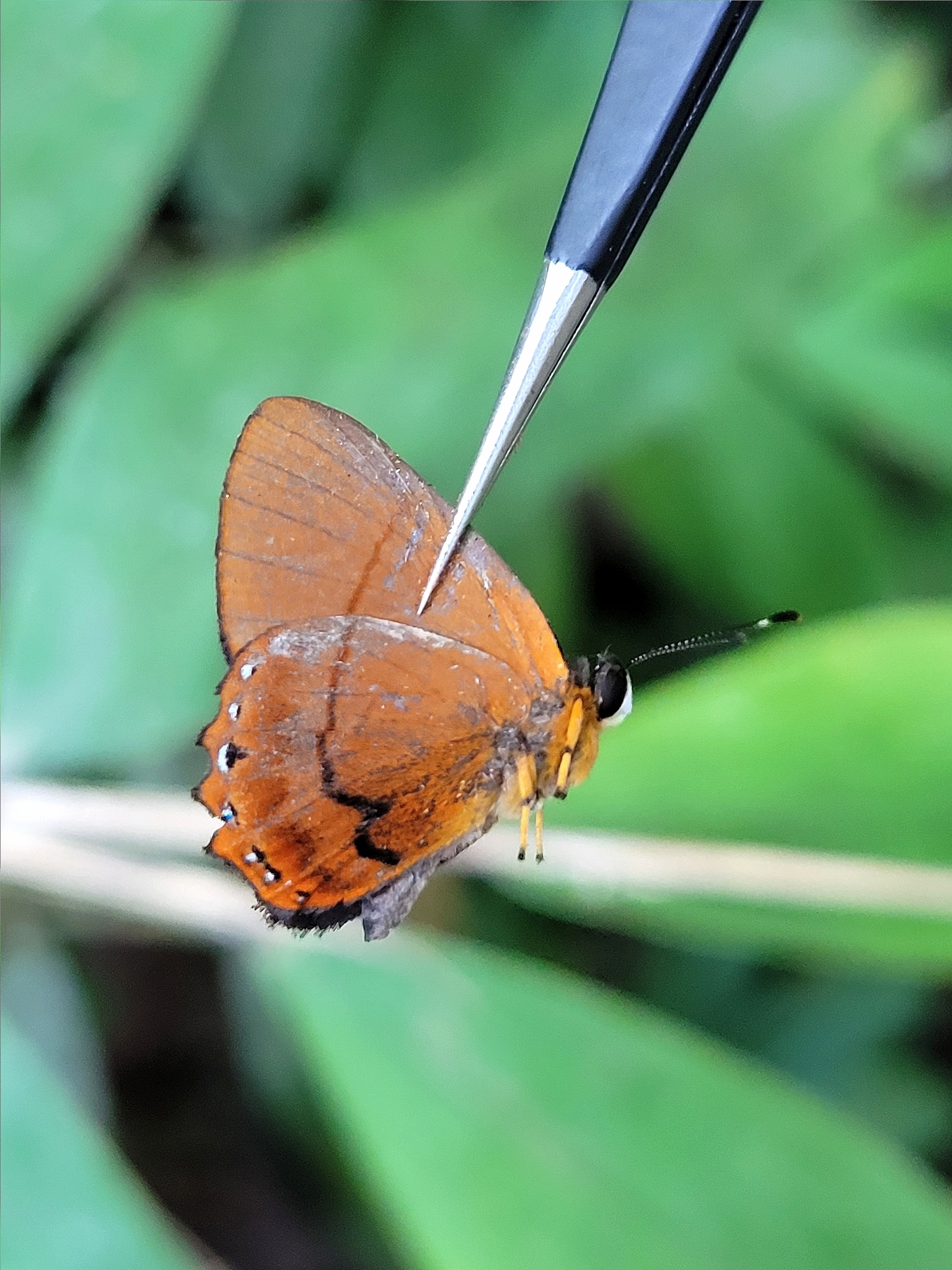
Pelolasia euboea, Ecuador

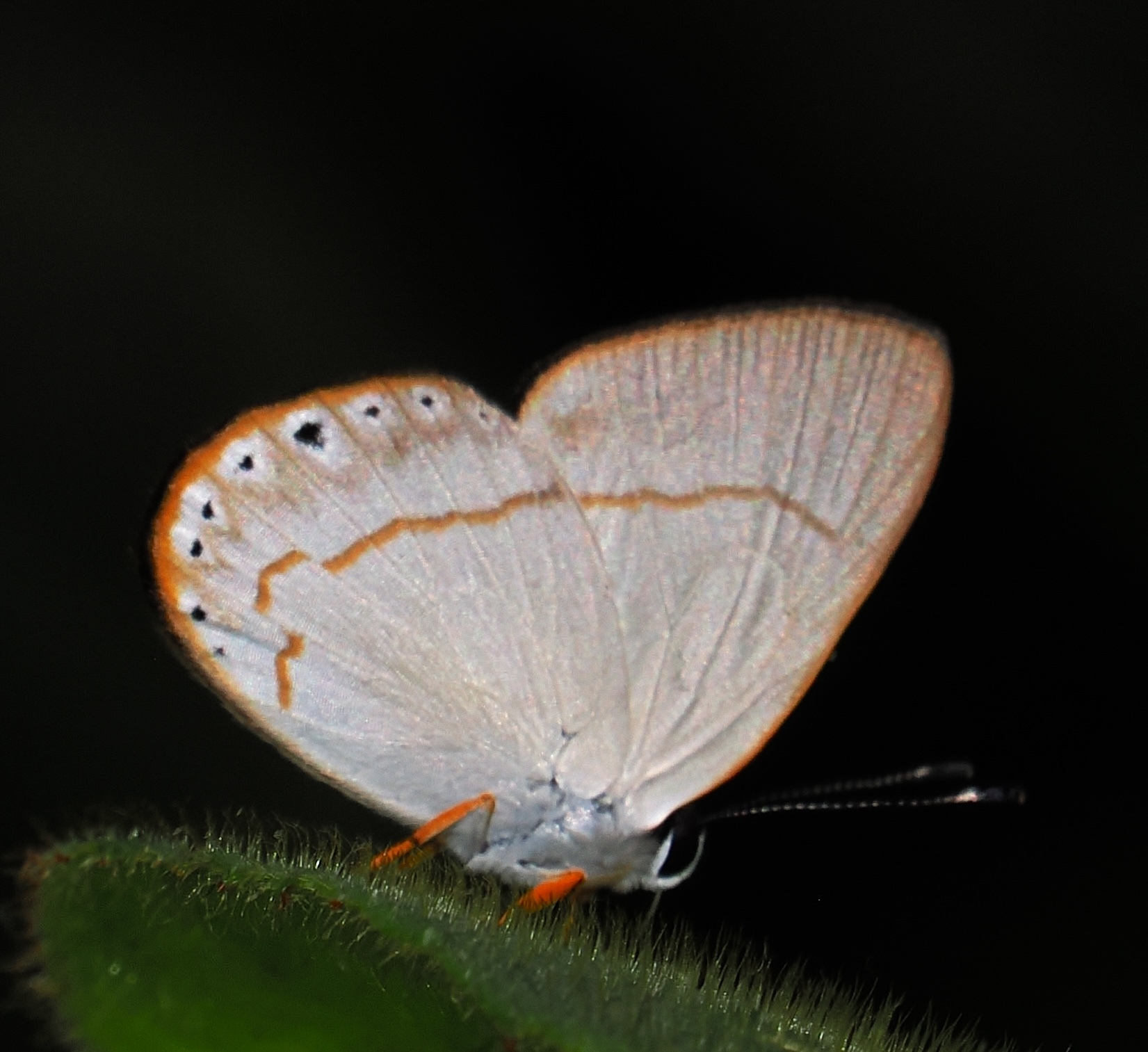
Pelolasia eumenes, Ecuador

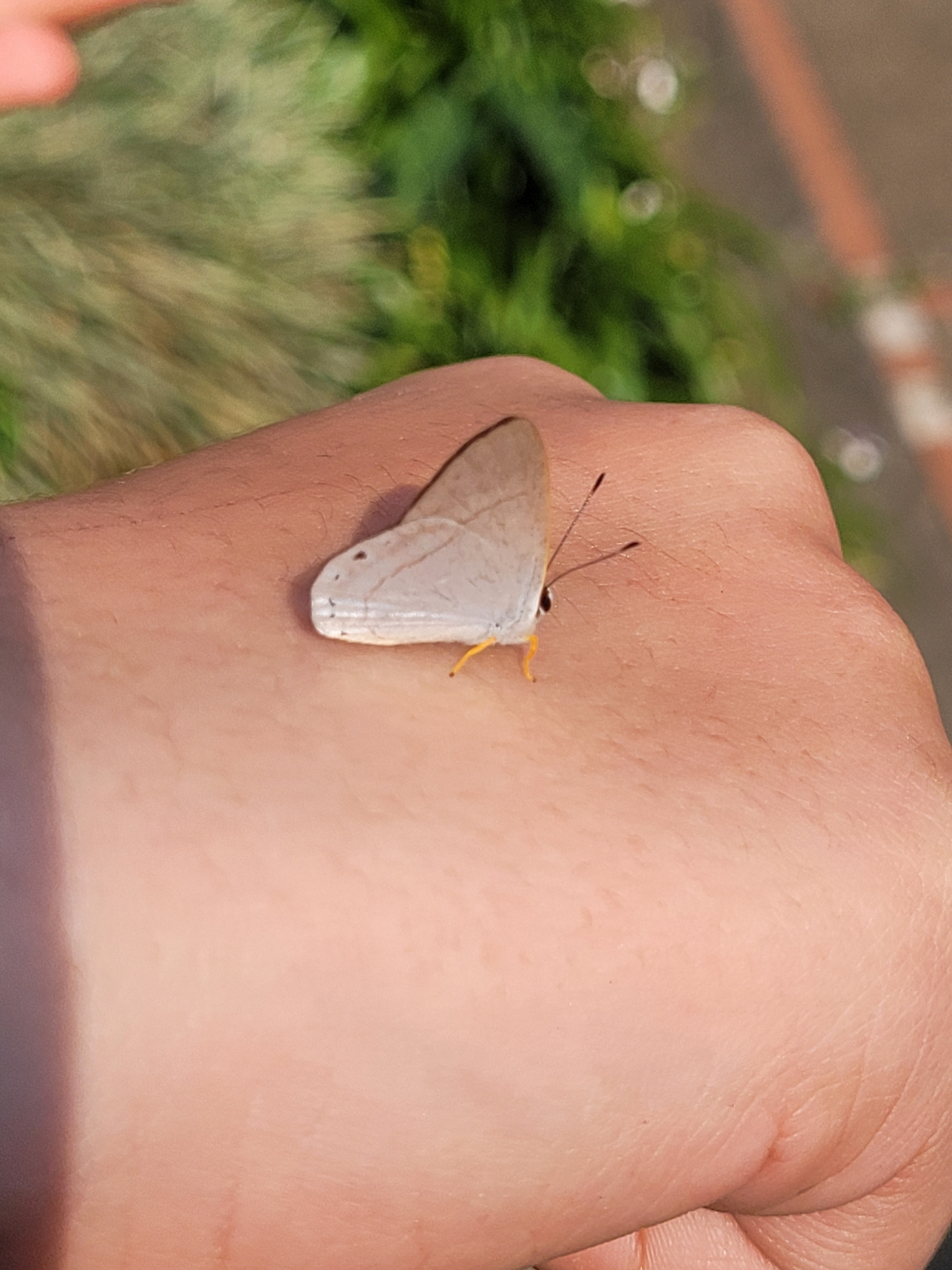
Pelolasia eupatra, Colombia

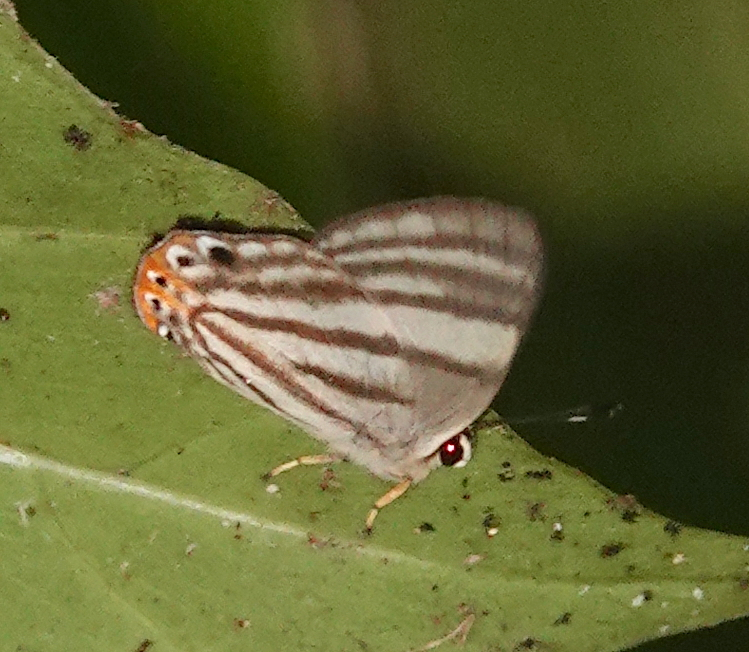
Pelolasia fervida, Colombia
