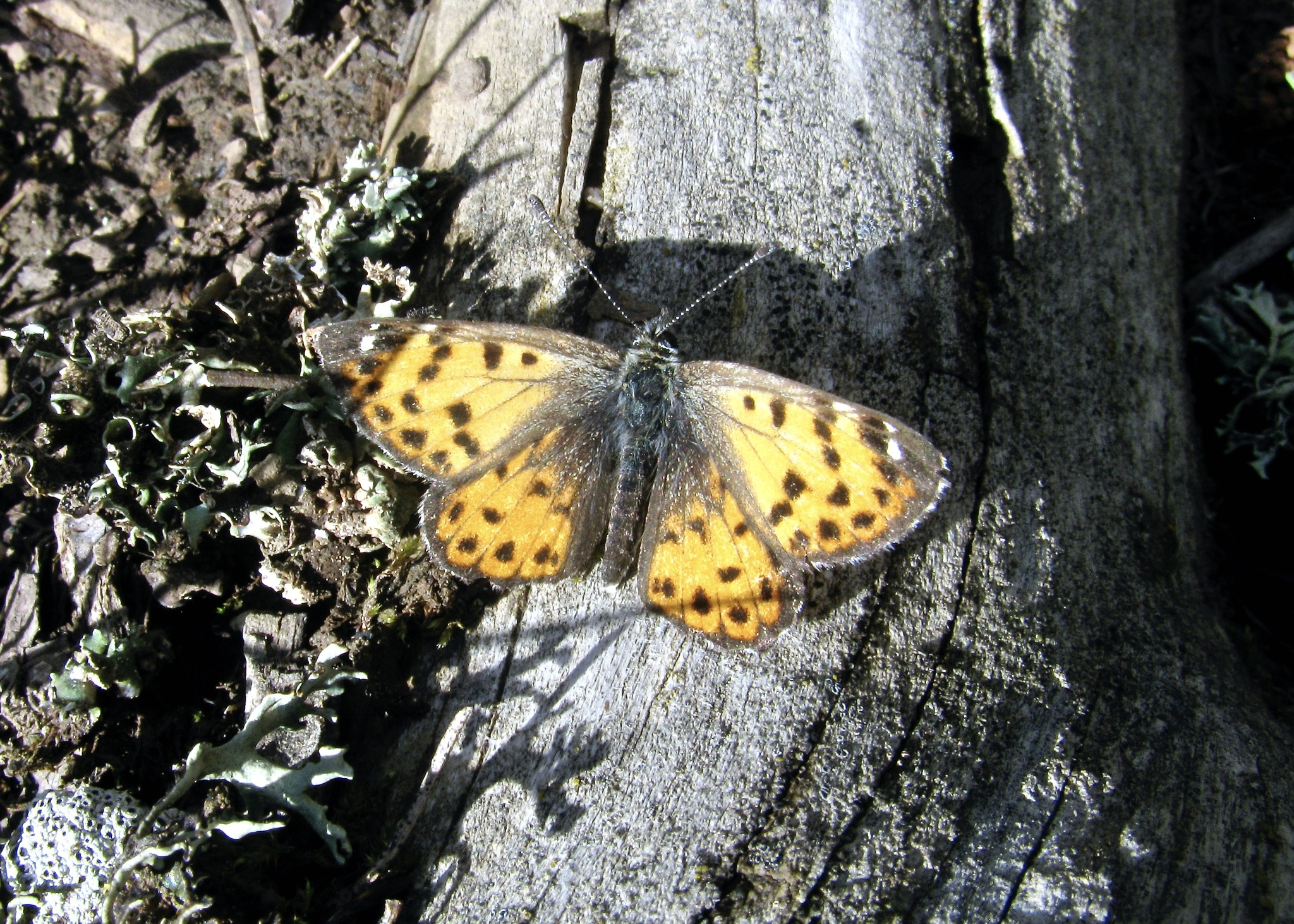
- Upperside

Scientific classification
- Kingdom: Animalia
- Phylum: Arthropoda
- Clade: Pancrustacea
- Class: Insecta
- Order: Lepidoptera
- Family: Riodinidae
- Subfamily: Nemeobiinae
- Tribe: Nemeobiini
- Genus: Polycaena
- Species: P. tamerlana

Binomial name
- Polycaena tamerlana Staudinger, 1886

= Polycaena tamerlana =

Species of butterfly

Polycaena tamerlana, also known as the Tamerlane's coppermark, is a butterfly in the family Riodinidae. It is found in Central Asia. Five subspecies of this species are recognized. It was discovered by Otto Staudinger in 1886.

== Description ==
The ground color of Polycaena tamerlana is usually blackish grey. There are two large black spots in the central cell of the forewings. The antennae are ringed black and white. The abdomen is black on the upperside and light or yellowish gray on the underside.

== Subspecies ==
There are five recognized susbpecies:

- Polycaena tamerlana tamerlana
- Polycaena tamerlana timur
- Polycaena tamerlana temir
- Polycaena tamerlana banghaasi
- Polycaena tamerlana pamira
