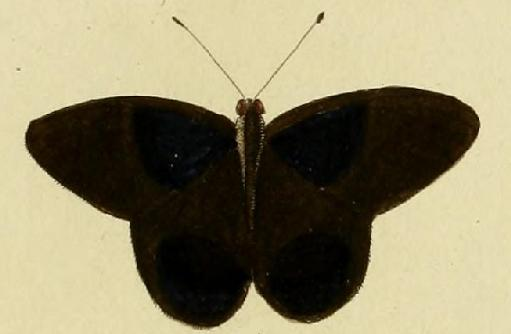

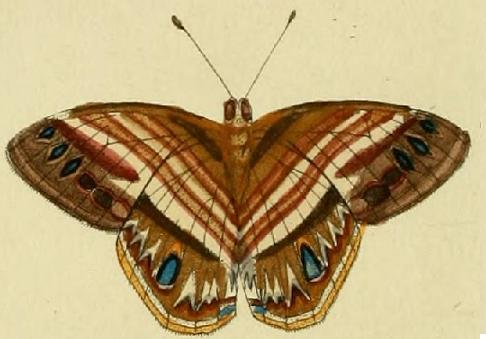

Scientific classification
- Domain: Eukaryota
- Kingdom: Animalia
- Phylum: Arthropoda
- Class: Insecta
- Order: Lepidoptera
- Family: Riodinidae
- Genus: Euselasia
- Species: E. orfita

Binomial name
- Euselasia orfita (Cramer, [1777])

Synonyms
- Papilio orfita Cramer, [1777]; Euselasia orfita eutychus f. truculenta Stichel, 1924

= Euselasia orfita =

Species of butterfly

Euselasia orfita is a species of metalmark butterfly, Riodinidae. It is found in the Guianas, Ecuador, Colombia, Bolivia, Brazil (Pará) and Peru.
