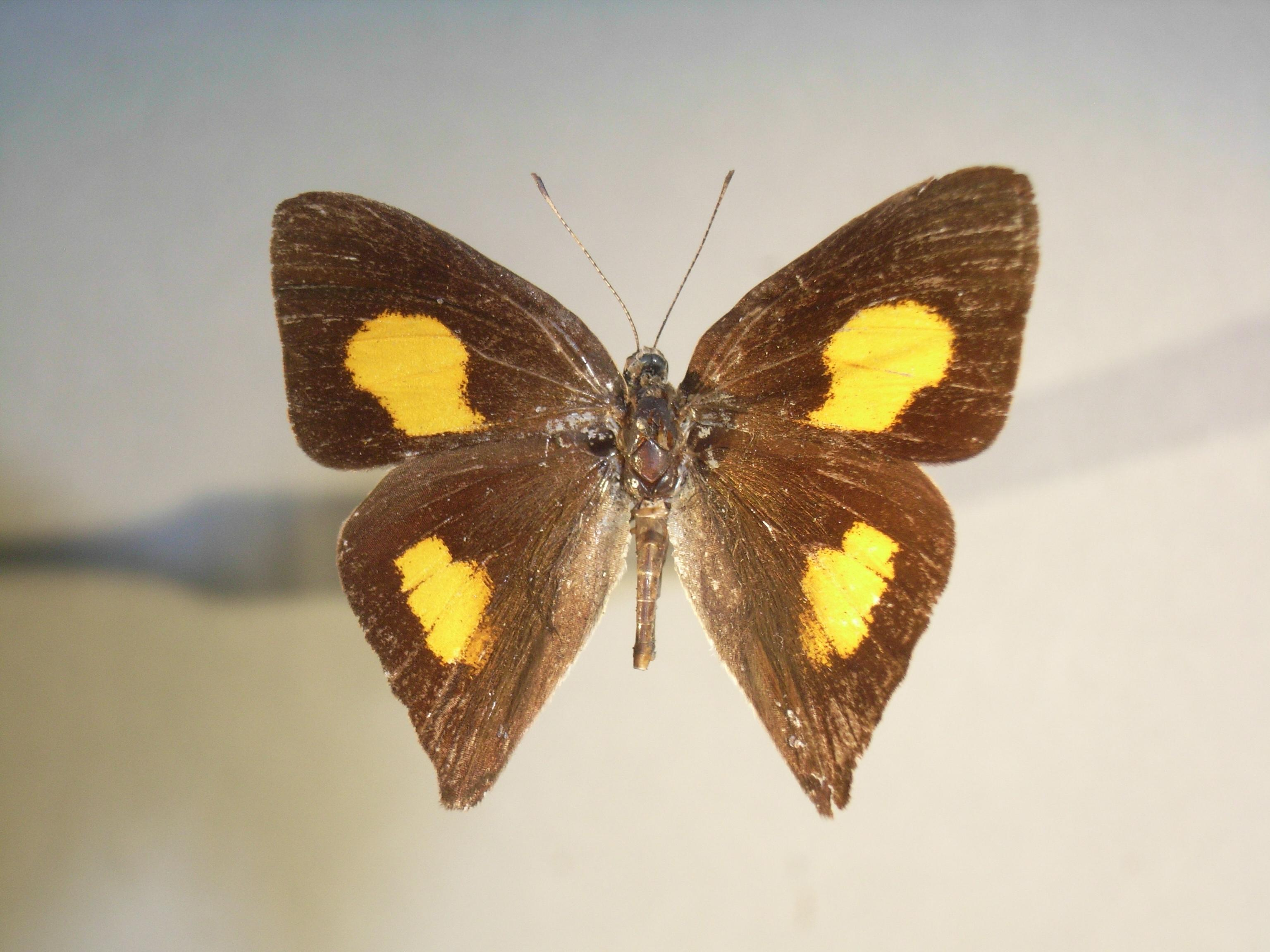

Scientific classification
- Kingdom: Animalia
- Phylum: Arthropoda
- Clade: Pancrustacea
- Class: Insecta
- Order: Lepidoptera
- Family: Riodinidae
- Genus: Euselasia
- Species: E. thucydides

Binomial name
- Euselasia thucydides (Fabricius, 1793)

Synonyms
- Hesperia thucydides Fabricius, 1793; Psalidopteris nycha Hübner, [1823]; Papilio arisbas Dalman, 1823; Euselasia thucydides mutica Stichel, 1925

= Euselasia thucydides =

Species of butterfly

Euselasia thucydides is a species of metalmark butterfly, Riodinidae. It is found in Brazil. Subspecies thucydides is found in eastern Brazil, ranging from Santa Catarina to Bahia and the Zona do Mato in eastern Minas Gerais, while ssp. truncata ranges through the central Planalto in Goias south east to the Serra do Cipo and to north central São Paulo.

The length of the forewings is 14–18 mm.

== Subspecies ==
- Euselasia thucydides thucydides (Brazil: Bahia, Minas Gerais)
- Euselasia thucydides trunctata Callaghan, 2001 (Brazil: Distrito Federal)
