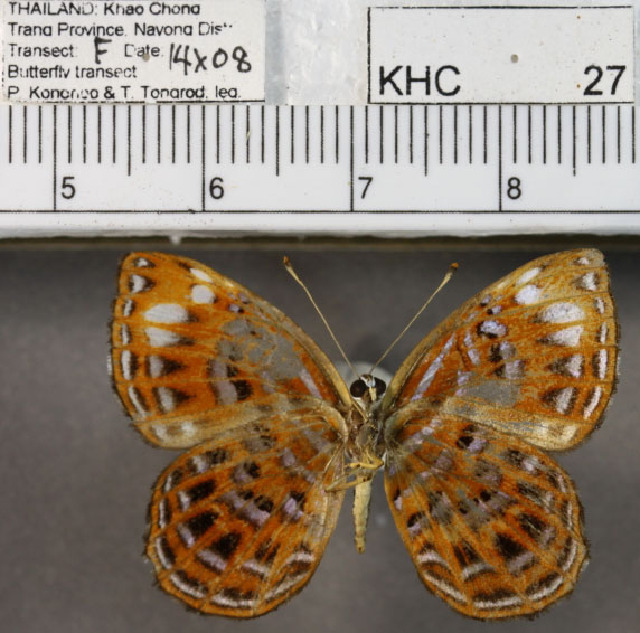
- Female ventral
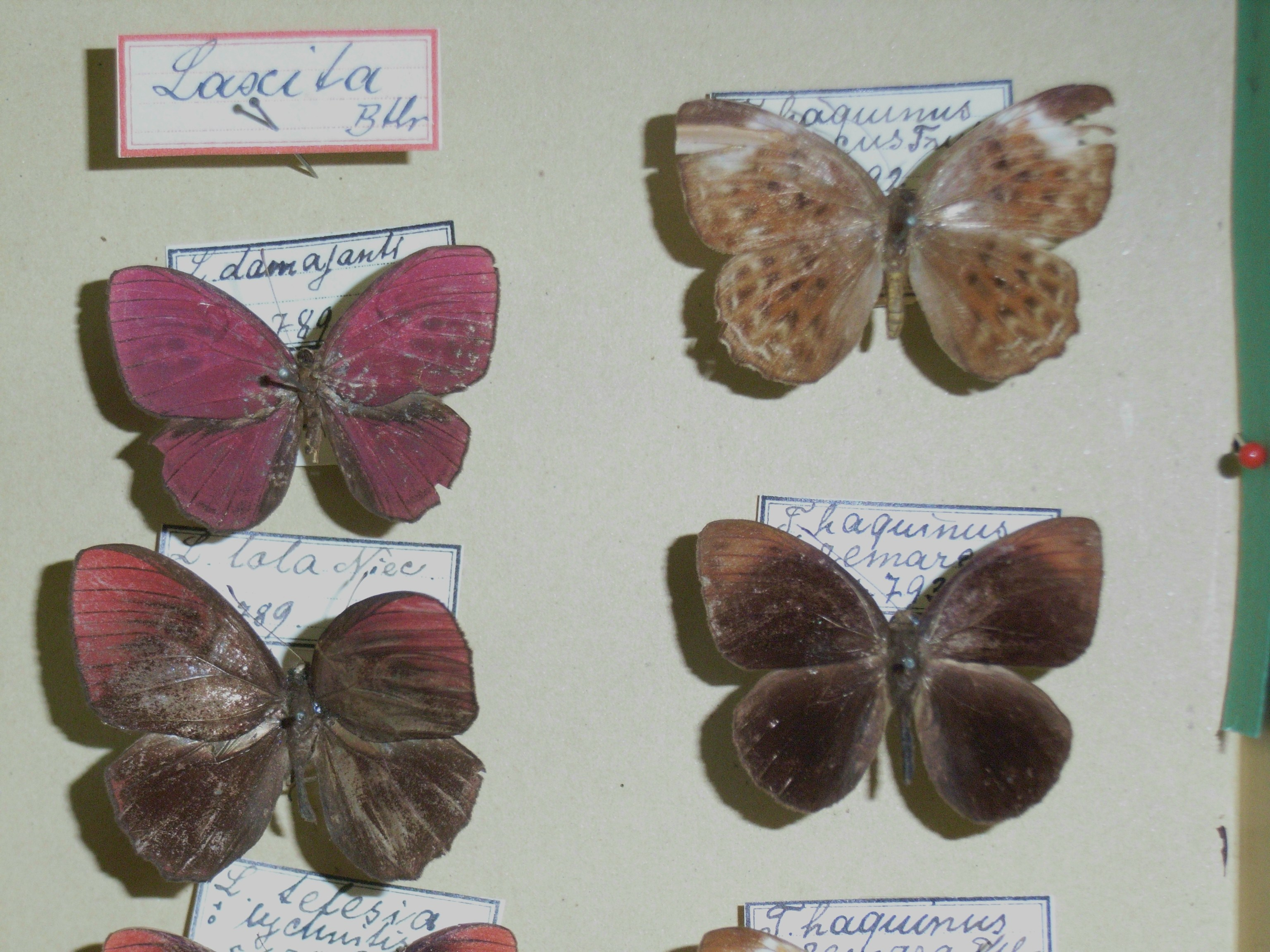
- Specimens in Museum Wiesbaden

Scientific classification
- Kingdom: Animalia
- Phylum: Arthropoda
- Clade: Pancrustacea
- Class: Insecta
- Order: Lepidoptera
- Family: Riodinidae
- Genus: Laxita
- Species: L. thuisto

Binomial name
- Laxita thuisto (Hewitson, 1861)

Synonyms
- Taxila thuisto Hewitson, 1861; Taxila thuisto eutyches Fruhstorfer, 1912; Taxila thuisto ephorus Fruhstorfer, 1904; Taxila thuisto melanotica Riley, 1945; Taxila thuisto therikles Fruhstorfer, 1912

= Laxita thuisto =

Species of butterfly

Laxita thuisto is an Indomalayan species in the butterfly family Riodinidae. It was described by William Chapman Hewitson in 1861.

== Subspecies ==
- Laxita thuisto thuisto (Peninsular Burma, Malaya, Sumatra, Borneo, Malaya, Langkawi, Singapore)
- Laxita thuisto eutyches (Fruhstorfer, 1912) (southern Borneo, Pulau Laut, Palawan)
- Laxita thuisto ephorus (Fruhstorfer, 1904) (northern Borneo)
- Laxita thuisto melanotica (Riley, 1945) (Mentawai)
- Laxita thuisto sawaja (Fruhstorfer, [1914]) (Burma, Mergui, Thailand)
- Laxita thuisto therikles (Fruhstorfer, 1912) (Sumatra, Bangka)
- Laxita thuisto esther Doubleday (Java)
