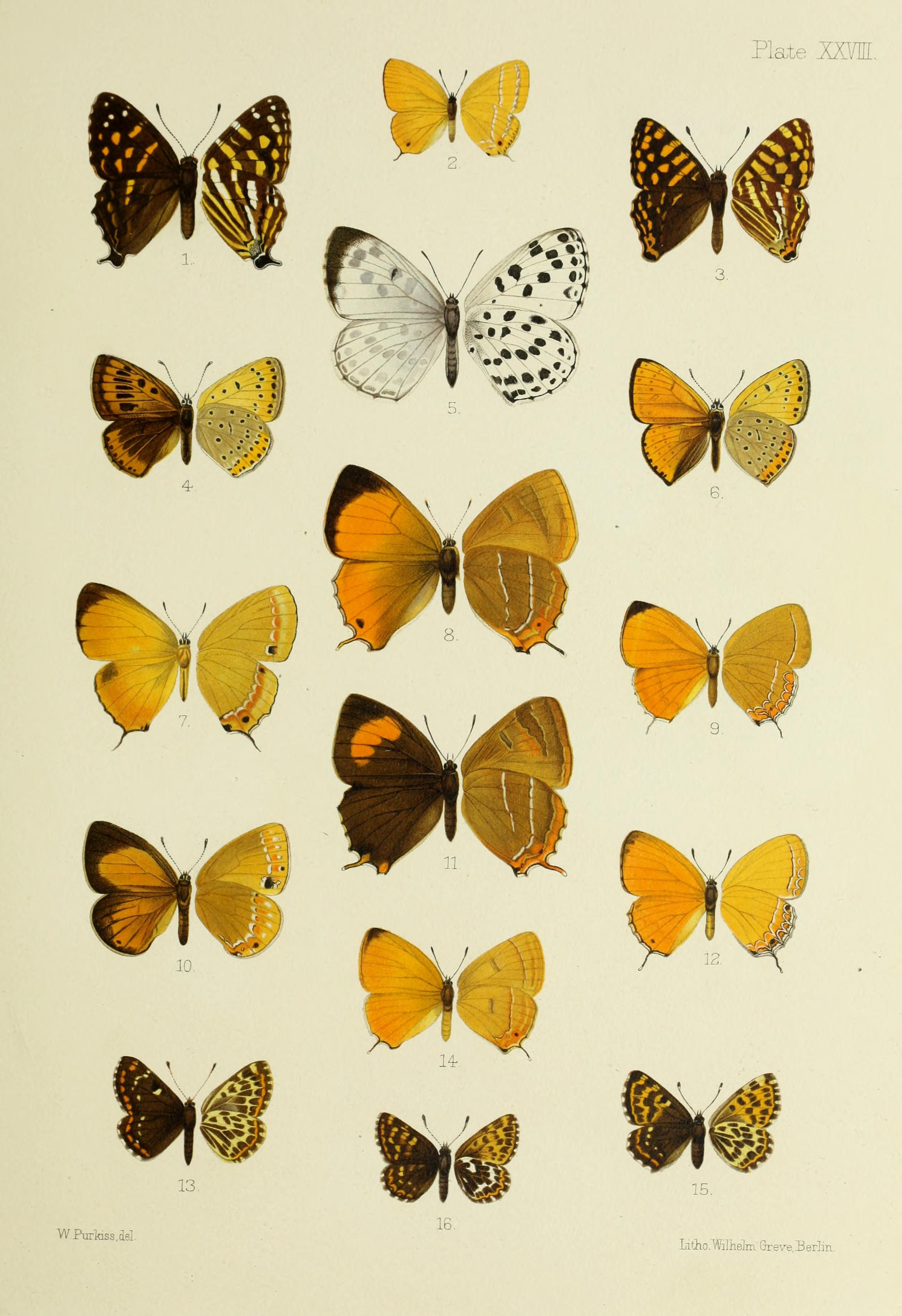
- Polycaena matuta (figure 16) and Polycaena lama (13 male, 15 female) in John Henry Leech's Butterflies from China, Japan, and Corea

Scientific classification
- Kingdom: Animalia
- Phylum: Arthropoda
- Class: Insecta
- Order: Lepidoptera
- Family: Riodinidae
- Tribe: Nemeobiini
- Genus: Polycaena; Staudinger, 1886

Species
- See text

= Polycaena =

Butterfly genus in family Lycaenidae

Polycaena is a genus of butterflies of the subfamily Nemeobiinae within the family Riodinidae. The genus was erected by Otto Staudinger in 1886. The species are found in the eastern Palearctic, mainly in the Himalayas.

Cladogram from the Catalogue of Life:

- Polycaena
  - Polycaena aestivalis
  - Polycaena attila
  - Polycaena banghaasi
  - Polycaena carmelita
  - Polycaena chauchowensis
  - Polycaena helcha
  - Polycaena kansuensis
  - Polycaena lama
  - Polycaena lua
  - Polycaena matuta
  - Polycaena minor
  - Polycaena pallidior
  - Polycaena princeps
  - Polycaena tamerlana
  - Polycaena temir
  - Polycaena timur
