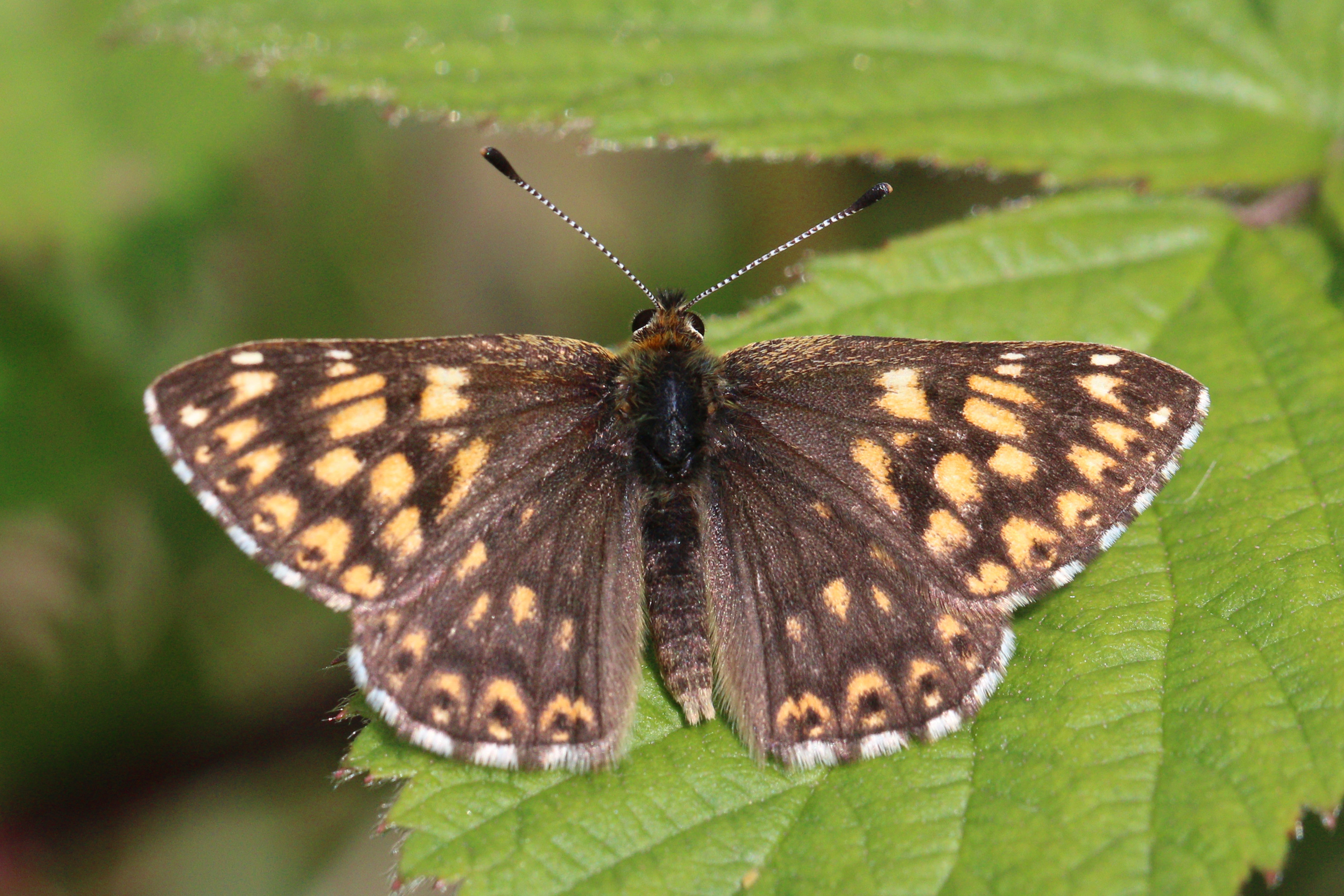

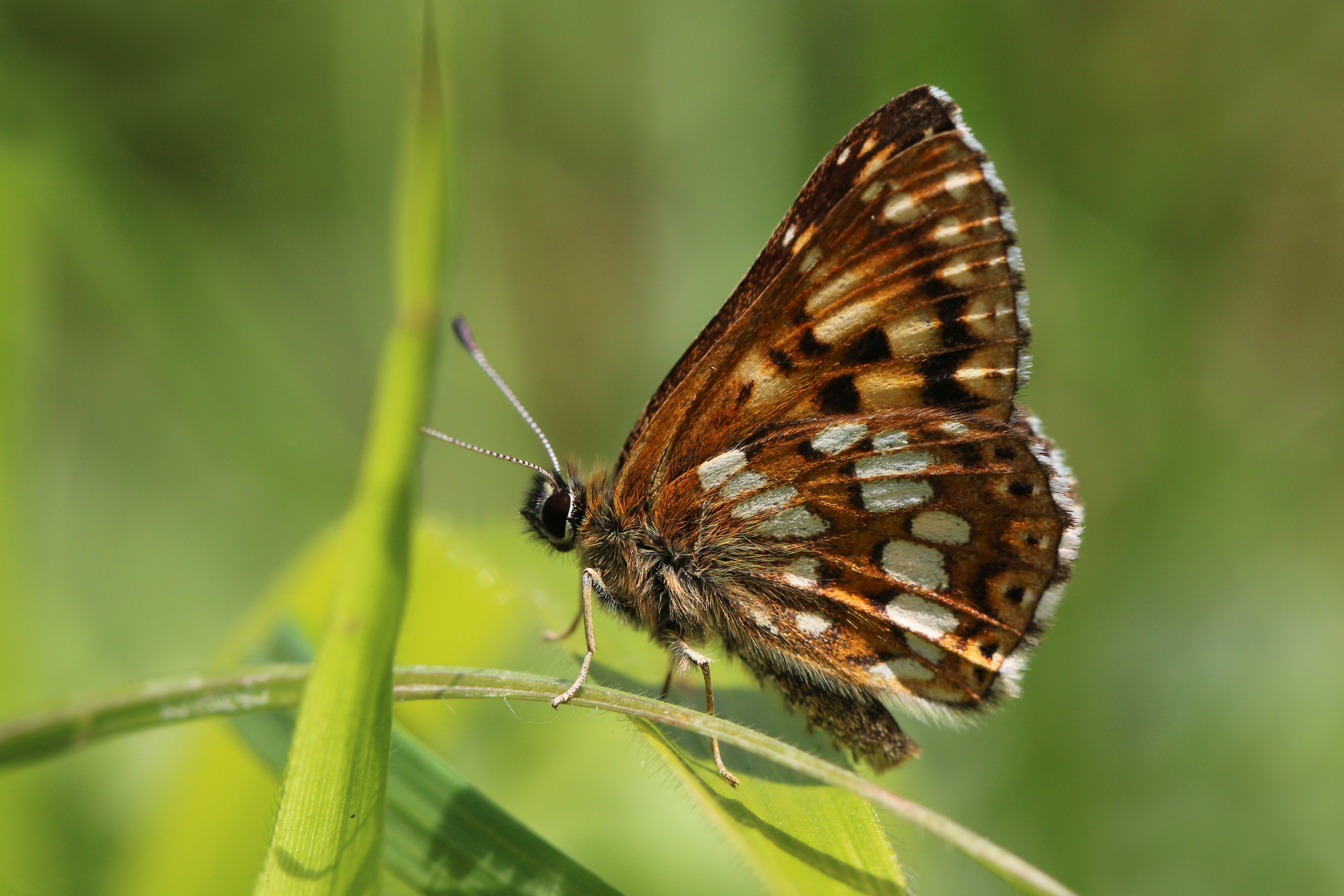
- Both males Ivinghoe Beacon, Buckinghamshire

Scientific classification
- Kingdom: Animalia
- Phylum: Arthropoda
- Clade: Pancrustacea
- Class: Insecta
- Order: Lepidoptera
- Family: Riodinidae
- Subfamily: Nemeobiinae
- Tribe: Zemerini; Stichel, 1928
- Genus: Hamearis; Hübner, [1819]
- Species: H. lucina

Binomial name
- Hamearis lucina (Linnaeus, 1758)

Synonyms
- Genus: Nemeobius Stephens, 1827; Species: Papilio lucina, Linnaeus, 1758

= Hamearis lucina =

Duke of Burgundy

Species of butterfly

Hamearis lucina, the Duke of Burgundy, the only member of the genus Hamearis, is a European butterfly in the family Riodinidae. For many years, it was known as the "Duke of Burgundy fritillary", because the adult's chequered pattern is strongly reminiscent of "true" fritillaries of the family Nymphalidae.

== Taxonomy and systematics ==
Riodinidae is currently treated as a distinct family within the superfamily Papilionoidea, but in the past they were held to be the subfamily Riodininae of the Lycaenidae. Earlier, they were considered to be part of the now defunct family "Erycinidae", whose species are divided between this family and the subfamily Libytheinae.

The genus Hamearis, described by Jacob Hübner in 1819 is a monotypic genus of uncertain position (incertae sedis). Here it is considered part of subfamily Nemeobiinae, tribe Zemerini, within the metalmark butterfly family (Riodinidae).

The origin of the common name is not known and the species was once called Mr Vernon's small fritillary.

== Description ==
The male has a wingspan of 29–31 millimetres (1.1–1.2 in), and the female 31–34 mm (1.2–1.3 in). The upperside of the wings are marked in a checquered pattern strongly reminiscent of a fritillary butterfly (family Nymphalidae); however, the Duke of Burgundy may be separated by its wing shape. Hamearis lucina also has a distinctive underwing pattern.

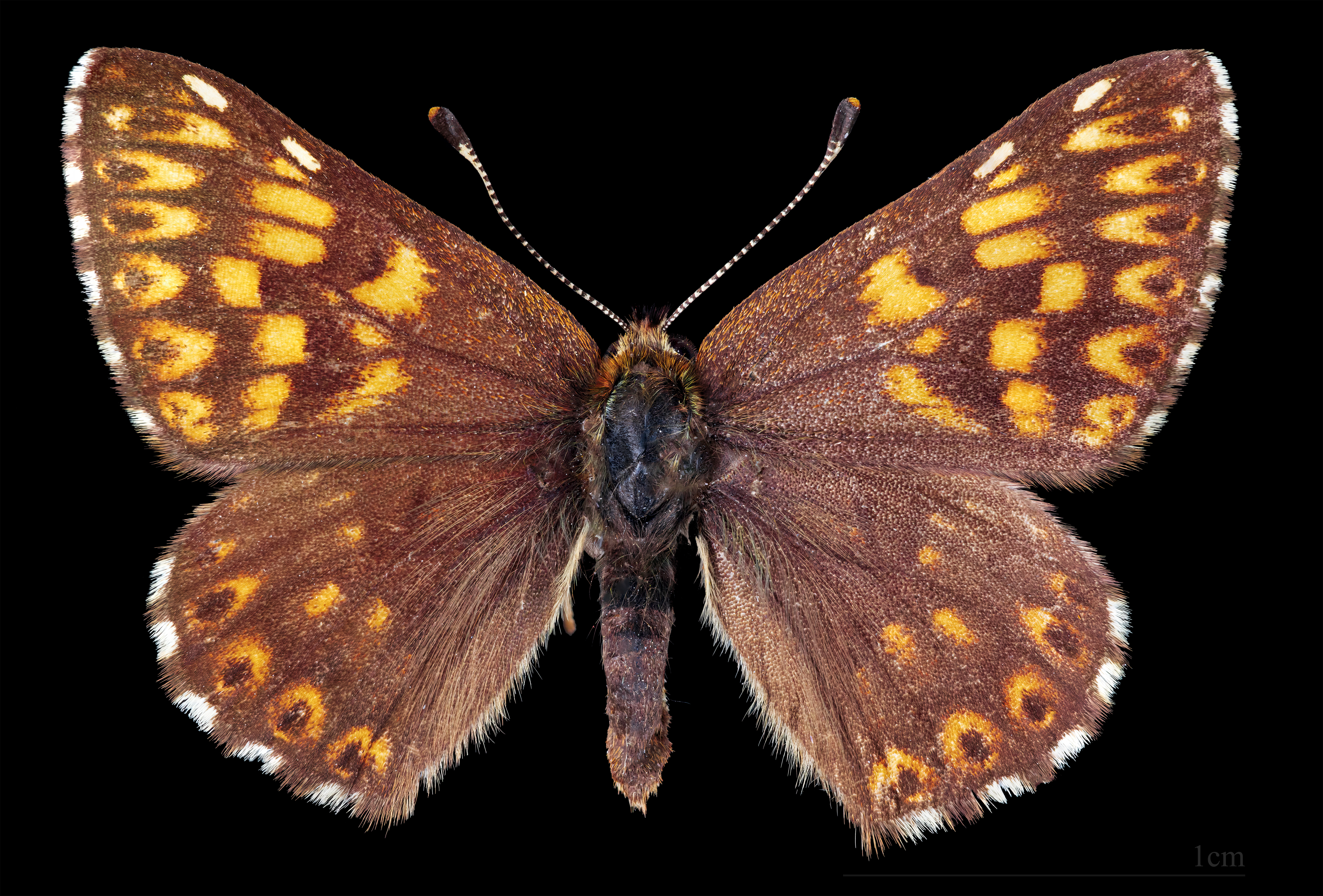
Hamearis lucina ♂

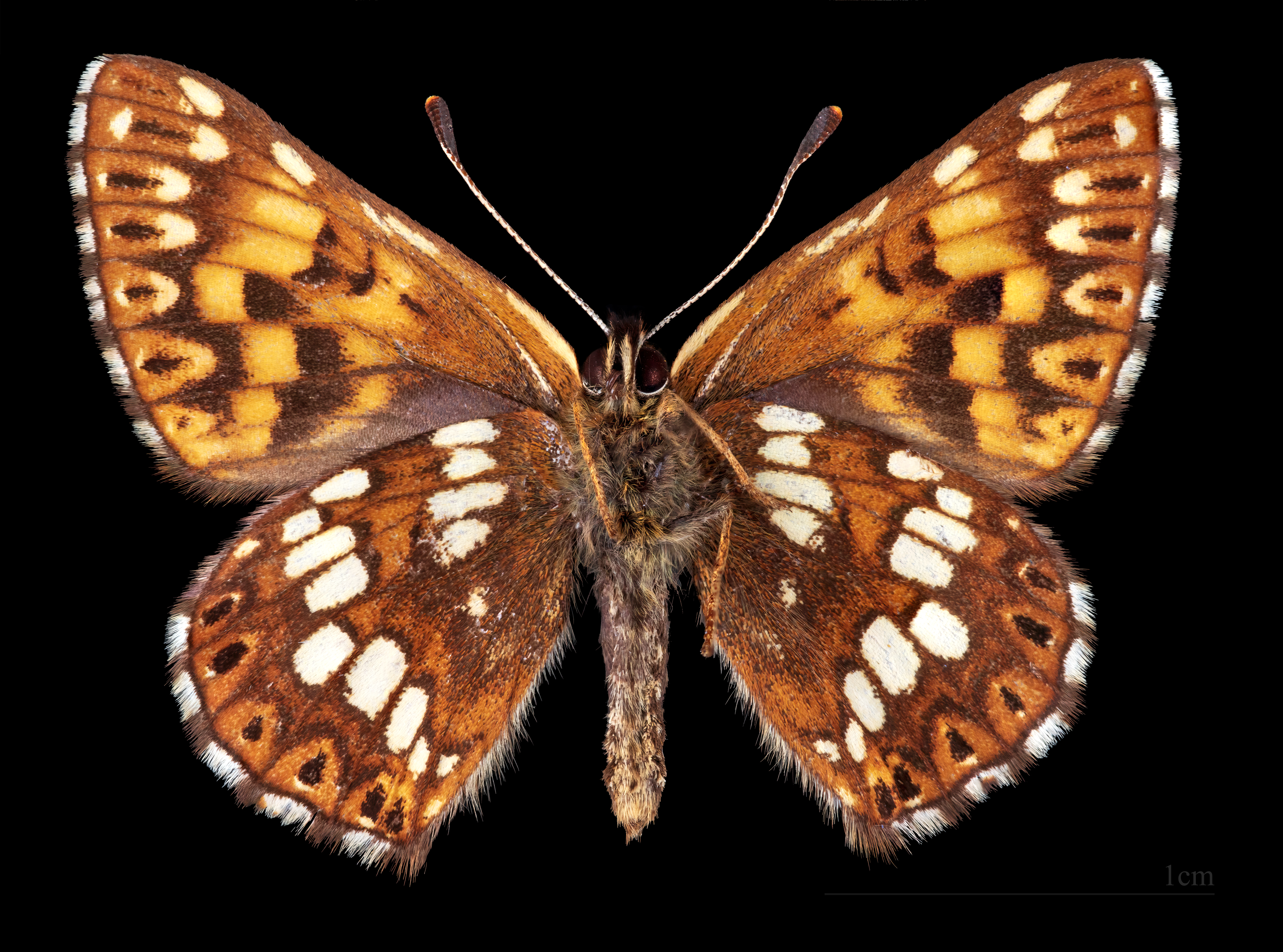
Hamearis lucina ♂ △

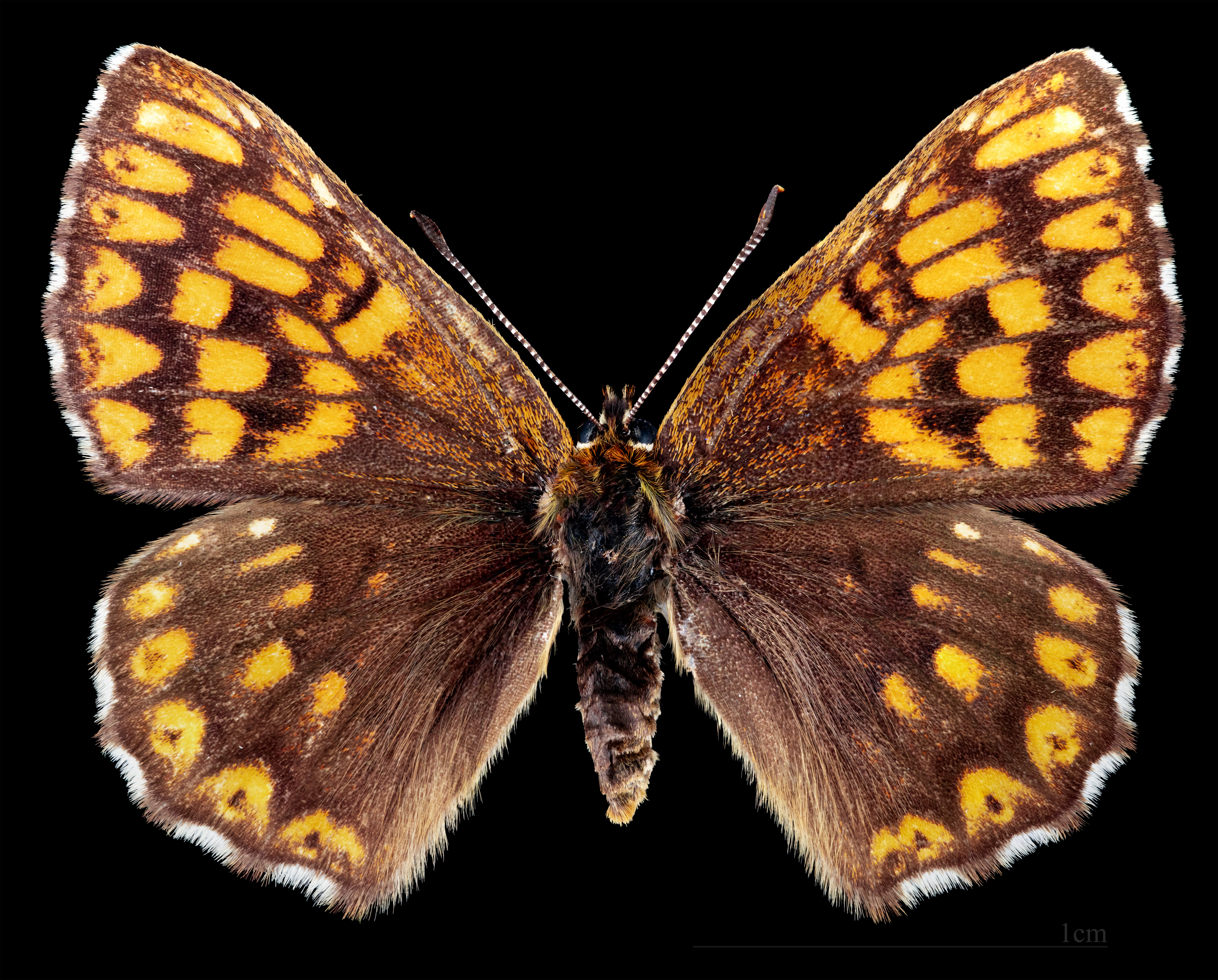
Hamearis lucina ♀

== Range ==
The species' range is restricted to the Western Palaearctic, from Spain, the UK and Sweden to the Balkans. It is the sole representative of its (sub)family in Europe.

== Status ==
Hamearis lucina is listed on the German IUCN Red List, but as of 2010 is considered of "least concern" on a Europe-wide basis.

Hamearis lucina was added to the UK Biodiversity Action Plan in 2007. It is also listed in the Wildlife and Countryside Act 1981, which requires anyone wishing to trade the species to have a licence. In the first decade of the 21st century the butterfly was in serious decline in the UK due to a lack of appropriate land management and overgrazing. Since 2003, twenty-two projects targeted the butterfly which reversed the threat of local extinction in the North York Moors, Kent and Sussex. It has recolonised former sites and colonised newly created habitat where it had not been previously recorded. From 2005 to 2016 the population trend was up 90% in the UK.

== Habitat ==
Two distinct habitats are used in the UK:

- Grassland on chalk or limestone
- Clearings in ancient woodland

Colonies prefer areas where the food plants grow among tussocky vegetation. The species prefers north- or west-facing slopes in downland habitats.

== Habits ==
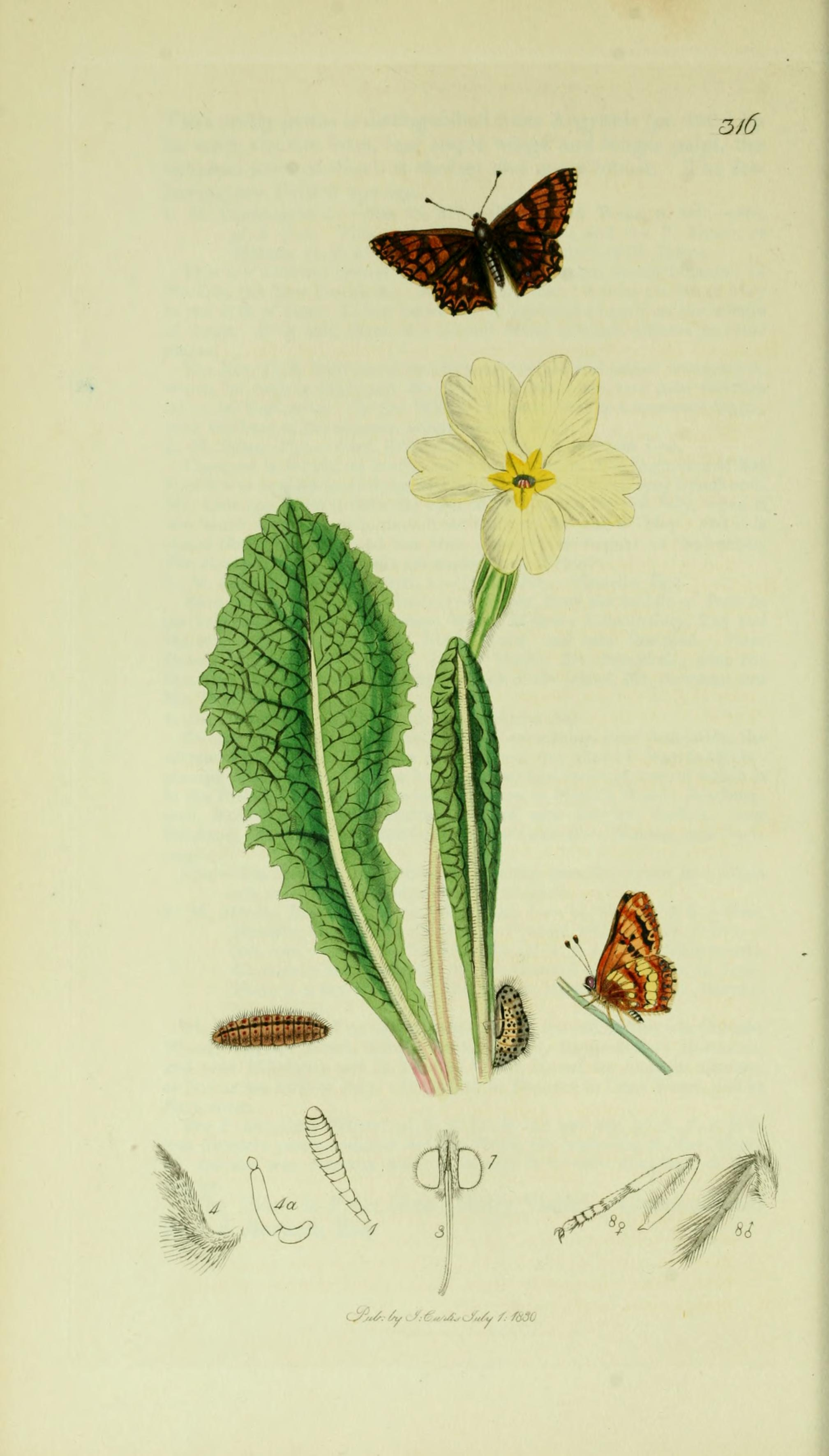
Illustration from John Curtis's British Entomology Volume 5

As adults, the sexes exhibit distinctly different behavioural patterns. Males are highly territorial, defending small sheltered, but warm, areas. Spectacular aerial "dog fights" occur between males. Females are less "showy", but are prone to wander, frequently travelling 250 m. New colonies have been established more than 5 km from the nearest known existing colony.

== Life cycle ==
=== Egg ===
Eggs are typically laid in small groups (up to eight) on the underside of leaves of a host plant; though they may also be laid singly or on foliage adjacent to the food plant (e.g. if primulas are growing among dense vegetation, old females laying in hot weather). Particularly "good" plants or leaves may have eggs from more than one female. The egg is spherical, with a flattened base, measuring 0.6 mm in diameter. The eggs are initially glossy and opaque, turning to a uniform pale green; prior to hatching, they develop a distinct dark purple blotch. Significant, though unintentional, predators of H. lucina eggs are large snails, as they eat primulas in the spring. The eggs hatch after 7–21 days depending on weather conditions.

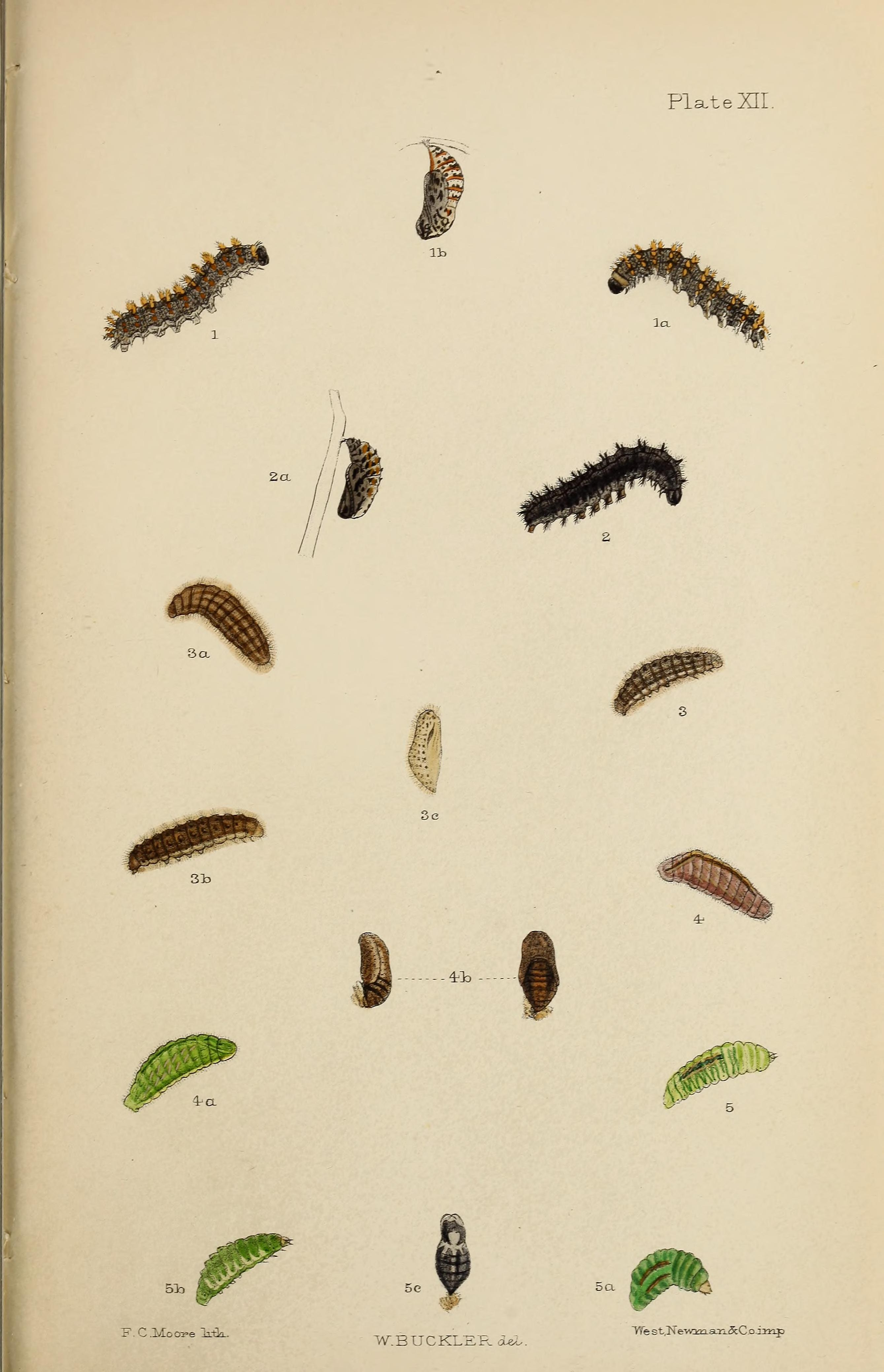
Figs. 3, 3a, 3b larva after last moult 3c pupa

=== Caterpillar ===
Newly emerged caterpillars are almost transparent, with a few long pale hairs. They move down to the base of leaf stems, where they spend the daylight hours (the caterpillars are nocturnal). For most of its first instar (before the first moult), the caterpillar is pale green. There are four instars, lasting about four weeks. The full-grown fourth-instar caterpillar measures 16–17 mm. It is pale brown with a dark brown dorsal stripe and numerous hairs; there is also a central black spot on each segment (inside the dorsal stripe).

Caterpillars feed mostly on the upper leaf surface, leaving leaf-veins intact, and quite unlike slug feeding signs. The caterpillars will not eat yellowed leaves, and will move on to another host plant in search of green leaves. Hamearis lucina caterpillars do not feed at temperatures below 11 °C or when it is wet. They have no significant predators or parasites.

=== Pupa ===
Pupae of H. lucina are short, just 9 mm (0.35 in) long. They are pale cream (somewhat tinged pink) with evenly spaced dark brown spots and a few pale hairs. They are found either very low in dense grass or on the ground. The pupal stage lasts nine months, with likely high mortality rates. Predators of pupae include shrews and slugs.

== Host plants ==
In the UK:

- Cowslip (Primula veris) — the majority of UK colonies
- Primrose (Primula vulgaris) — woodland colonies
- False oxlip (Primula × polyantha) — few colonies
- Cultivated primulas — in captivity

Elsewhere in the species' range, other food plants include:

- Oxlip (Primula elatior)

== In popular culture ==
Peter Strickland's 2014 film The Duke of Burgundy is named after this butterfly.

== See also ==
- List of butterflies of Great Britain
