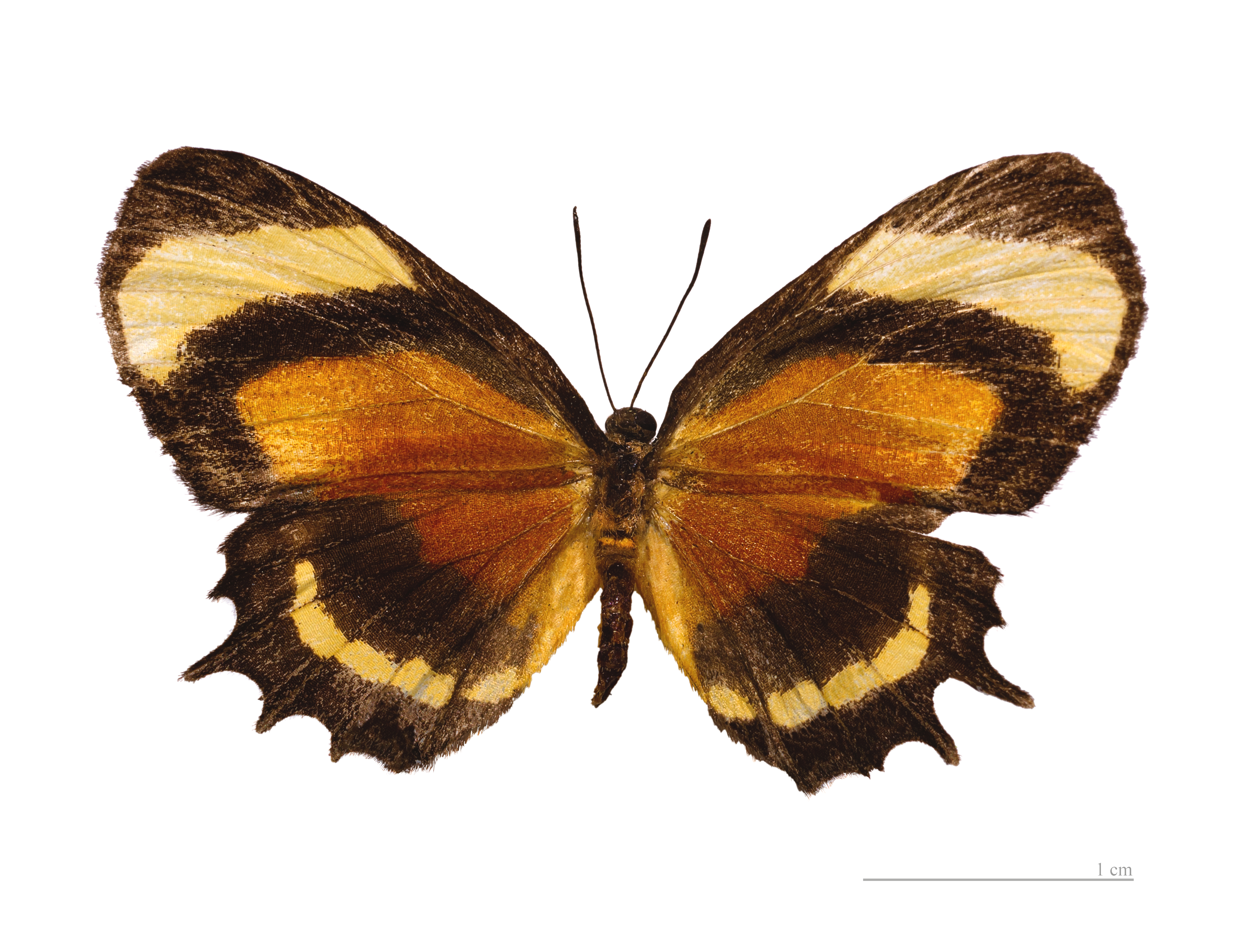
- Museum specimen in Muséum de Toulouse
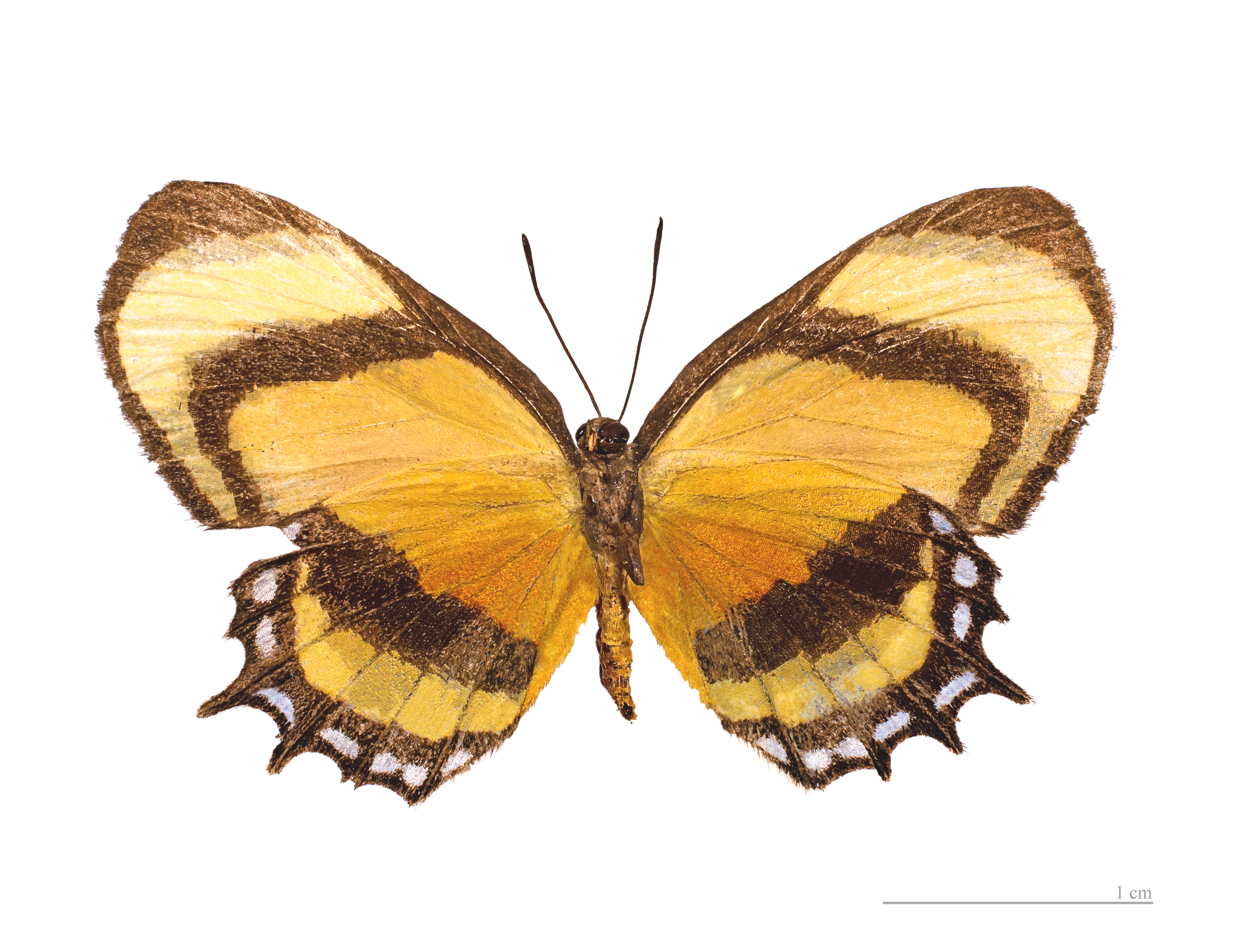
- Underside

Scientific classification
- Kingdom: Animalia
- Phylum: Arthropoda
- Clade: Pancrustacea
- Class: Insecta
- Order: Lepidoptera
- Family: Riodinidae
- Subfamily: Euselasiinae
- Tribe: Euselasiini
- Genus: Methone; Doubleday, 1847
- Species: M. cecilia

Binomial name
- Methone cecilia (Cramer, [1777])

Synonyms
- Methonella Westwood, 1852; Papilio cecilia Cramer, [1777]; Papilio amyntor Fabricius, 1781 (preocc. Cramer, 1775); Papilio dorine Stoll, 1782; Methonella chrysomela Butler, 1872; Methone chrysomela eusebes Stichel, 1919; Methonella vitellia Seitz, 1913; Methonella cecilia magnarea Seitz, 1913; Methonella amithrata Seitz, 1913; Methone cecilia magnarea f. metella Stichel, 1919; Methone columbana Stichel, 1924

= Methone cecilia =

Species of butterfly

Methone is a genus in the butterfly family Riodinidae present only in the Neotropical realm.

== Taxonomy ==
The genus Methone is monotypic. The single species is Methone cecilia is unmistakably characterized by the conspicuous colouring and the deeply indented margin of the hindwing being continued in the female at the ends of the veins into teeth-like small tails. On the forewing the subcostal is four-branched; the branches 1 and 2 rise before, 3 and 4 behind the cell. The hindwing is without a basal vein. The palpi are extremely short.

The colouring resembles that of certain Themone, Cartea, Monethe, Aricoris which imitate butterflies such as Ithomiinae and pericopine moths. The females are very stout and clumsy which makes them still more similar to the unwieldy Actinote. They are quite common but they are local and seem not to leave their birthplace.

=== List of subspecies ===
- Methone cecilia cecilia present in Suriname and French Guiana
- Methone cecilia chrysomela (Butler, 1872) present in Costa Rica, Panama and Colombia
- Methone cecilia magnarea (Seitz, 1913) present in Brazil (Amazonas), Peru and Bolivia
- Methone cecilia eurotias (Stichel, 1919) present in Ecuador
- Methone cecilia caduca (Stichel, 1919) present in Costa Rica
