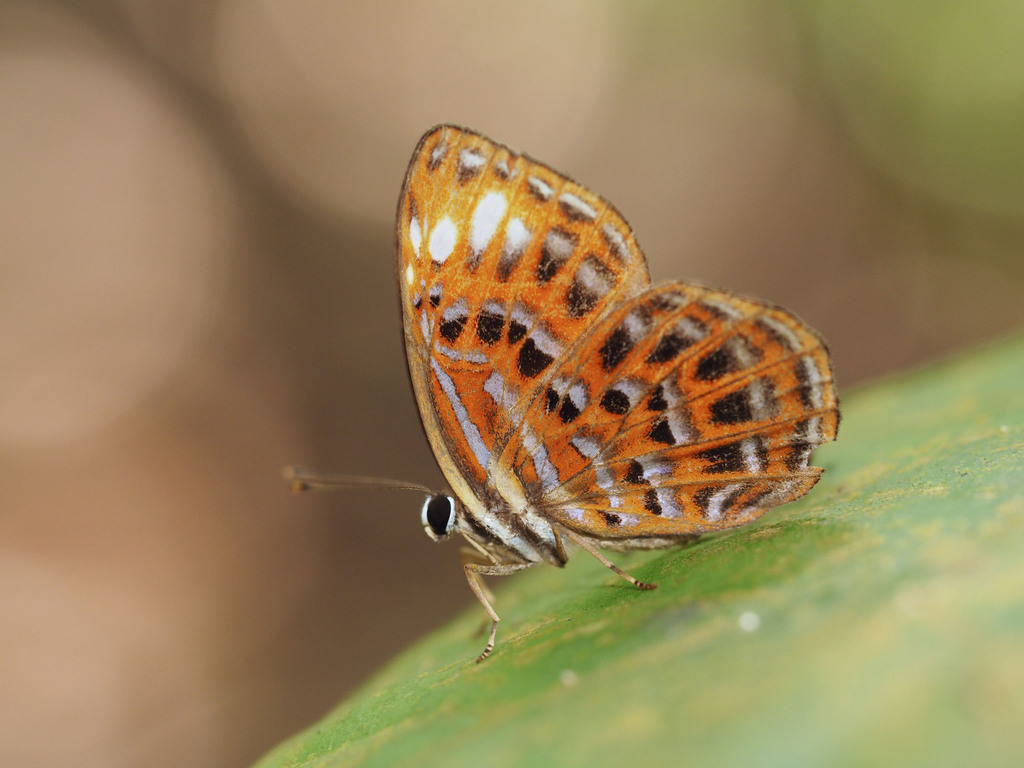
- Laxita thuisto in Singapore

Scientific classification
- Kingdom: Animalia
- Phylum: Arthropoda
- Clade: Pancrustacea
- Class: Insecta
- Order: Lepidoptera
- Family: Riodinidae
- Subfamily: Nemeobiinae
- Tribe: Nemeobiini
- Subtribe: Abisarina
- Genus: Laxita; Butler, 1879

Species
- Laxita ischaris; Laxita lola; Laxita teneta; Laxita thuisto

Synonyms
- Zarax Fruhstorfer, 1914

= Laxita =

Genus of butterflies

Laxita is a genus of butterflies in the family Riodinidae, the metalmarks. They are found in Southeast Asia.

== Distribution ==
Species in Laxita are native to Southeast Asia. They are found in Laos, Cambodia, Thailand, Malaysia, Singapore, and Indonesia.

== Species ==
The Global Biodiversity Information Facility lists the following species:

- Laxita ischaris (Godart, 1824)
- Laxita lola de Nicéville, 1894
- Laxita teneta (Hewitson, 1860)
- Laxita thuisto (Hewitson, 1860) - Lesser harlequin

== Gallery ==
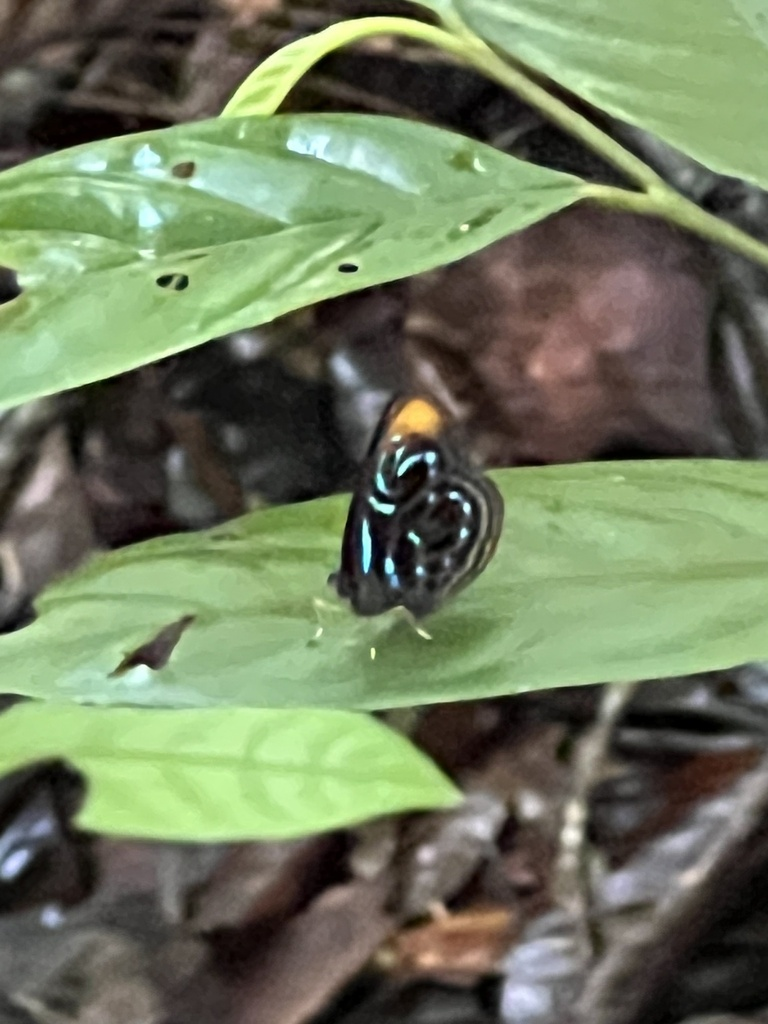
Laxita teneta in Sarawak, Malaysia
