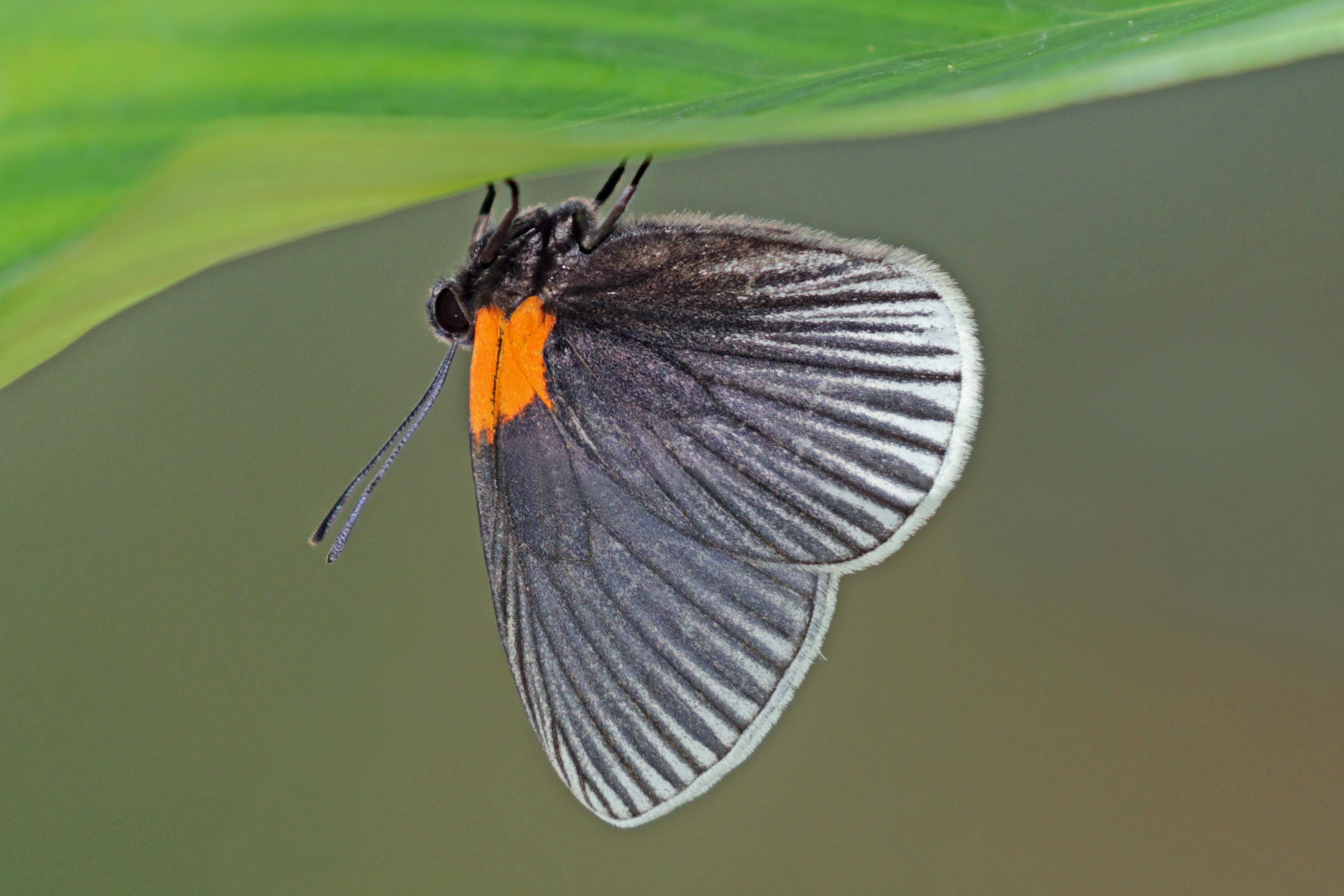
- Hades noctula White-rayed metalmark, Costa Rica

Scientific classification
- Domain: Eukaryota
- Kingdom: Animalia
- Phylum: Arthropoda
- Class: Insecta
- Order: Lepidoptera
- Family: Riodinidae
- Subfamily: Euselasiinae

= Euselasiinae =

Subfamily of insects

Euselasiinae is a subfamily of Riodinidae. The species are confined to the Neotropical realm.

== Genera ==
From Funet

- Corrachia Schaus, 1913
- Euselasia (Hübner, 1819) a populous genus with many species.
- Hades (Westwood, 1851)
- Methone (Doubleday, 1847)
- Styx Staudinger, 1875
