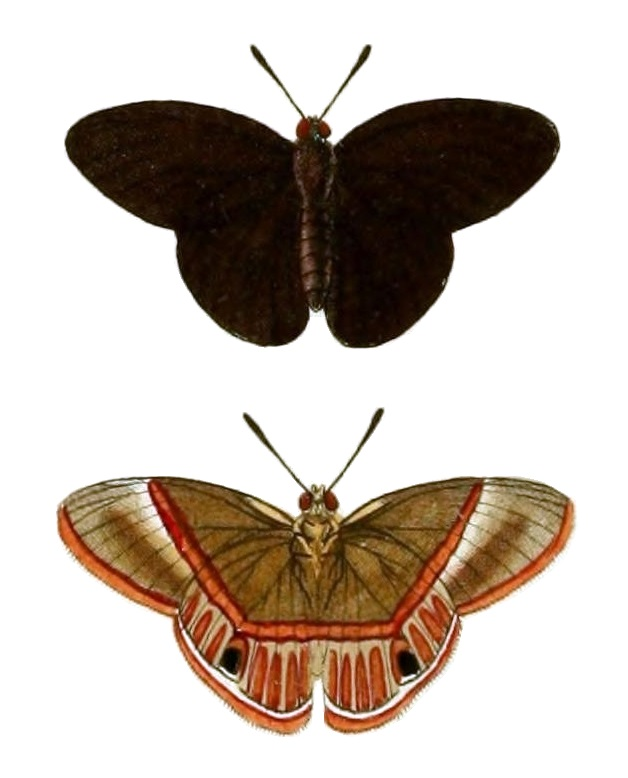
- Euselasia arbas

Scientific classification
- Kingdom: Animalia
- Phylum: Arthropoda
- Clade: Pancrustacea
- Class: Insecta
- Order: Lepidoptera
- Family: Riodinidae
- Subfamily: Euselasiinae
- Genus: Euselasia; Hübner, 1819

Species
- About 170

Synonyms
- Erythia Hübner, [1819]; Marmessus Hübner, [1819]; Psalidopteris Hübner, 1823; Eurygona Boisduval, 1836

= Euselasia =

Genus of butterflies

Euselasia is a genus of butterflies in the family Riodinidae. They are present only in the Neotropical realm. The genus was erected by Jacob Hübner in 1819.

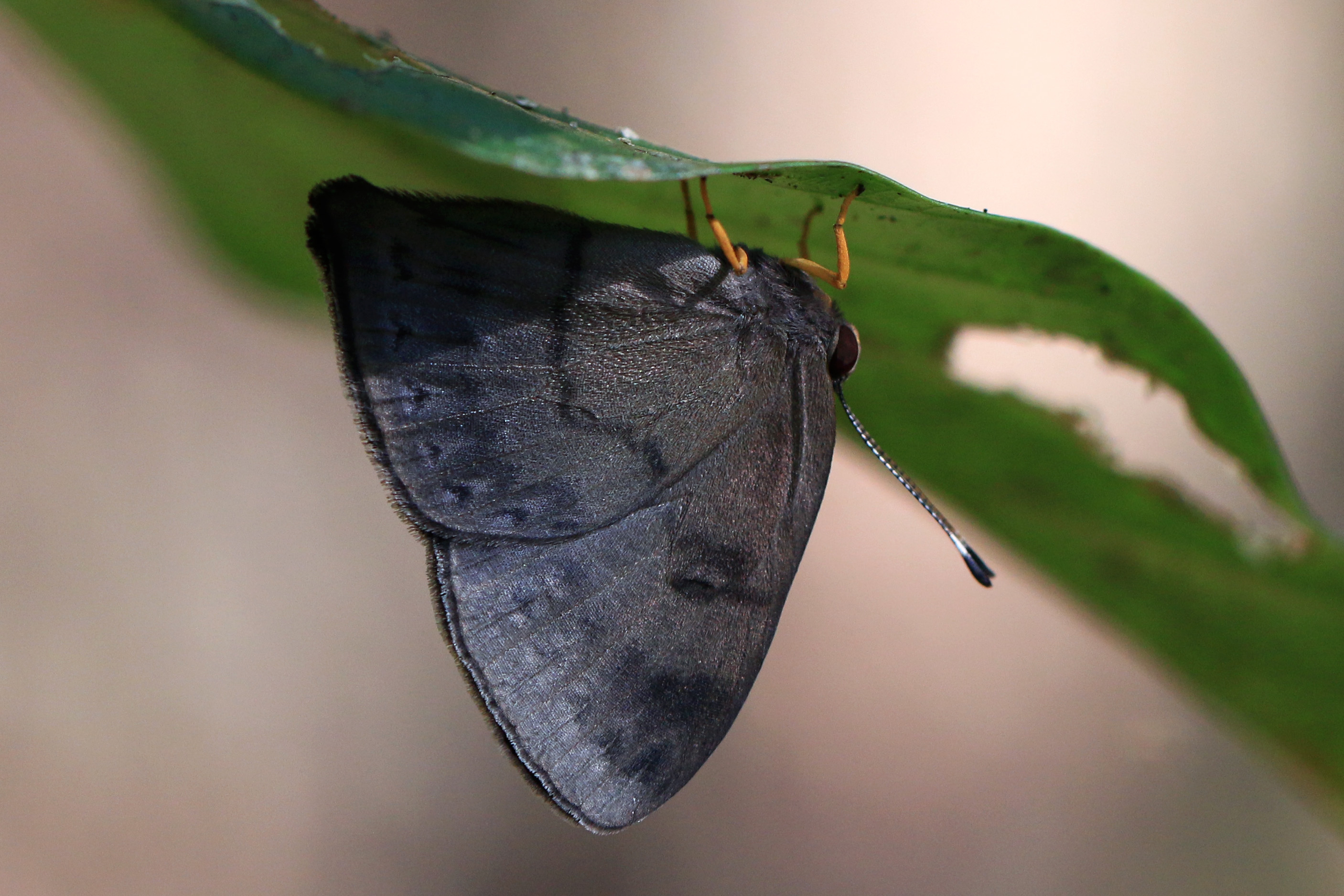
E. eugeon, the eugeon sombermark, on the Cristalino River, southern Amazon, Brazil

== Description ==
The wing veins are inconstant. Some species have two, others three, and one species (E. aurantiaca) even four subcostal branches. The genus is recognizable by the anterior radial vein either running directly in the elongation of the subcostal, or being connected with it by a very short anterior discocellular.

The butterflies often have the appearance of small satyrids or Thecla species; as for instance Euselasia eutychus resembles (particularly beneath) exactly Euptychia helle flying in the same locality, or Thecla themathea; or Euselasia clithra resembles Euptychia chloris and so on. On the upper surface there is often a very bright reflection of a shining power otherwise not found in any lepidopteran and of a truly wonderful iridescence.

The larvae are somewhat of the shape of a woodlouse, very brightly coloured, behind the head there are two points. The pupae are covered with fine, fluffy hairs like the larvae, green, held by a belt. The imagines are partly extraordinarily rare and belong to the few Riodinidae that fly to a considerable height. They also clap their wings together when at rest like other day butterflies, unlike most of the other Riodinidae which spread them out like the Geometridae.

== Taxonomy ==
This is one of the largest genera in the family Riodinidae. As of 2004 there were almost 170 species and more are being described continually. The type species of the genus is Euselasia gelon (Stoll, [1787]).

== Species ==
Species include:

- Euselasia albomaculiga Callaghan, 1999 present in Colombia
- Euselasia alcmena (H. Druce, 1878) present in Ecuador
- Euselasia amblypodia Lathy, 1926 present in Peru
- Euselasia amphidecta (Godman & Salvin, 1878) present in Costa Rica and Panama
- Euselasia andreae Hall, Willmott & Busby, 1998 present in Ecuador
- Euselasia angulata (Bates, 1868) present in Mexico, Costa Rica, Brazil and Colombia
- Euselasia anica (Herrich-Schäffer, [1853]) present in Suriname
- Euselasia arbas (Stoll, 1781) present in French Guiana, Guyana, Suriname and Colombia
- Euselasia archelaus Seitz, 1916 present in Ecuador and Bolivia
- Euselasia argentea (Hewitson, 1871) present in Mexico, Nicaragua, Bolivia and Colombia
- Euselasia artos (Herrich-Schäffer, [1853]) present in Suriname
- Euselasia athena (Hewitson, 1869) present in Ecuador
- Euselasia attrita Seitz, 1916 present in Bolivia
- Euselasia aurantia (Butler & H. Druce, 1872) present in Panama, Costa Rica and Colombia
- Euselasia aurantiaca (Salvin & Godman, 1868) present in Panama, Costa Rica, Nicaragua, Venezuela and Colombia
- Euselasia authe (Godman, 1903) present in Brazil and Peru
- Euselasia baucis Stichel, 1919 present in Colombia and Peru
- Euselasia bettina (Hewitson, 1869) present in Costa Rica, Nicaragua and Ecuador
- Euselasia bilineata Lathy, 1926 present in French Guiana
- Euselasia brevicauda Lathy, 1926 present in Bolivia
- Euselasia cafusa (Bates, 1868) present in French Guiana, Guyana, Suriname, Trinidad and Tobago, Ecuador and Brazil
- Euselasia calligramma (Bates, 1868) present in Brazil
- Euselasia candaria (H. Druce, 1904) present in Colombia
- Euselasia cataleuca (R. Felder, 1869) present in Mexico
- Euselasia catoleuce (Hübner, 1823)
- Euselasia charilis (Bates, 1868) present in Colombia and Brazil
- Euselasia chinguala Hall & Willmott, 1995 present in Ecuador
- Euselasia chrysippe (Bates, 1866) present in Guatemala, Nicaragua, Costa Rica, Panama, and Colombia
- Euselasia clesa (Hewitson, 1856) present in Brazil
- Euselasia clithra (Bates, 1868) present in Brazil
- Euselasia corduena (Hewitson, 1874) present in Panama, Costa Rica, Bolivia, Peru and Colombia
- Euselasia crinon Stichel, 1919 present in Bolivia and Peru
- Euselasia cucuta (Schaus, 1902) present in Venezuela
- Euselasia cuprea Lathy, 1926 present in French Guiana
- Euselasia cyanira Callaghan, 1997 present in Peru
- Euselasia cyanofusa Hall & Willmott, 1998 present in Ecuador and Peru
- Euselasia dolichos Staudinger, [1887]
- Euselasia dorina (Hewitson, 1860) present in Brazil.
- Euselasia fervida (Butler, 1874) present in Venezuela, Colombia and Brazil
- Euselasia eberti Callaghan, 1999 present in Brazil
- Euselasia effima (Hewitson, 1869) present in Ecuador
- Euselasia ella Seitz, 1916 present in Bolivia, Colombia and Brazil
- Euselasia erilis Stichel, 1919 present in Brazil
- Euselasia ethemon (Cramer, 1776)
- Euselasia euboea (Hewitson, [1853]) present in French Guiana, Guyana, Suriname, Venezuela, Bolivia and Brazil
- Euselasia eubule (R. Felder, 1869) present in Mexico, Costa Rica and Panama
- Euselasia eucerus (Hewitson, 1872) present in Brazil
- Euselasia eucrates (Hewitson, 1872)present in Panama, Costa Rica, Ecuador, Venezuela and Colombia
- Euselasia eucritus (Hewitson, [1853]) present in Bolivia and Brazil
- Euselasia eugeon (Hewitson, 1856) - Eugeon sombermark - present in Brazil, Bolivia and Argentina
- Euselasia euhemerus (Hewitson, 1856) present in Brazil
- Euselasia eulione (Hewitson, 1856) present in Brazil
- Euselasia eumedia (Hewitson, [1853]) present in Suriname and Brazil
- Euselasia eumenes (Hewitson, [1853]) present in Brazil
- Euselasia eumithres Stichel, 1919 present in Brazil
- Euselasia eunaeus (Hewitson, [1855]) Brazil
- Euselasia euodias (Hewitson, 1856) present in French Guiana and Brazil
- Euselasia euoras (Hewitson, [1855]) present in French Guiana, Bolivia, Ecuador, Brazil and Peru
- Euselasia eupatra Seitz, 1916 present in Colombia
- Euselasia euphaes (Hewitson, [1855]) present in Brazil and Peru
- Euselasia euploea (Hewitson, [1855]) present in Brazil
- Euselasia euriteus (Cramer, 1777) present in Suriname and Brazil
- Euselasia euromus (Hewitson, 1856) present in Brazil
- Euselasia eurymachus (Hewitson, 1872) present in Ecuador
- Euselasia euryone (Hewitson, 1856) present in French Guiana, Guyana, Suriname, Ecuador, Brazil, Peru and Bolivia
- Euselasia eurypus (Hewitson, 1856) present in Brazil
- Euselasia erythraea (Bates, 1868) present in Colombia and Brazil
- Euselasia eusepus (Hewitson, [1853]) present in Mexico and Brazil
- Euselasia eutaea (Hewitson, [1853]) present in Suriname and Brazil
- Euselasia eustola Stichel, 1919 present in French Guiana, Peru and Bolivia
- Euselasia eutychus (Hewitson, 1856) present in Guyana, Colombia and Brazil
- Euselasia extensa Bates, 1968 present in Brazil
- Euselasia fabia (Godman, 1903) present in Ecuador and Peru
- Euselasia fournierae Lathy, 1924 present in Brazil
- Euselasia gelanor (Stoll, 1780) present in French Guiana, Suriname and Bolivia
- Euselasia gelon (Stoll, [1787]) present in Suriname and Bolivia
- Euselasia geon Seitz, 1913 present in Brazil, Bolivia and Argentina
- Euselasia gordios Stichel, 1919 present in Bolivia
- Euselasia gradata Stichel, 1927 present in Venezuela
- Euselasia gyda (Hewitson, 1860) present in Panama, Costa Rica, Colombia, Brazil and Bolivia
- Euselasia hahneli Staudinger, [1887] present in Peru
- Euselasia hieronymi (Salvin & Godman, 1868) present in Mexico, Panama, Costa Rica, Guatemala, Nicaragua and Ecuador
- Euselasia hygenius (Stoll, 1787) present in Suriname and Brazil
- Euselasia hypophaea (Godman & Salvin, 1878) present in Panama
- Euselasia ignitus Stichel, 1924 present in French Guiana and Brazil
- Euselasia illarina Hall & Willmott, 1998 present in Ecuador
- Euselasia inconspicua (Godman & Salvin, 1878) present in Panama and Colombia
- Euselasia inini Brévignon, 1996 present in French Guiana
- Euselasia issoria (Hewitson, 1869) present in Ecuador
- Euselasia janigena Stichel, 1919 present in Peru
- Euselasia jigginsi Hall & Willmott, 1998 present in Ecuador
- Euselasia jocotoco
- Euselasia julia (H. Druce, 1878) present in Brazil
- Euselasia kartopus Stichel, 1919 present in French Guiana, Bolivia and Peru
- Euselasia labdacus (Stoll, 1780) present in Suriname, Panama, Costa Rica, Venezuela and Colombia
- Euselasia leucon (Schaus, 1913) present in Panama and Costa Rica
- Euselasia leucophryna (Schaus, 1913) present in Costa Rica
- Euselasia lisias (Cramer, [1777]) present in French Guiana, Guyana, Suriname and Colombia
- Euselasia lycaeus Staudinger, 1888 present in Brazil
- Euselasia lysimachus Staudinger, 1888 present in Brazil
- Euselasia manoa Brévignon, 1996 present in French Guiana
- Euselasia mapatayana Hall & Willmott, 1998 present in Ecuador and Colombia
- Euselasia matuta (Schaus, 1913) present in Costa Rica
- Euselasia mazaca (Hewitson, 1860) present in Brazil
- Euselasia melaphaea (Hübner, 1823) present in Suriname, Bolivia and Brazil
- Euselasia micaela (Schaus, 1902) present in Peru
- Euselasia midas (Fabricius, 1775) present in Panama, Costa Rica, French Guiana, Guyana, Suriname, Colombia, Bolivia and Peru
- Euselasia mirania (Bates, 1868) present in Brazil
- Euselasia modesta (Bates, 1868) present in Brazil and Argentina
- Euselasia murina Stichel, 1925 present in Brazil
- Euselasia mutator Seitz, 1916 present in Peru
- Euselasia mys (Herrich-Schäffer, [1853]) present in Suriname and Brazil
- Euselasia mystica (Schaus, 1913) present in Costa Rica
- Euselasia nauca Hall & Willmott, 1998 present in Ecuador
- Euselasia nytua
- Euselasia oaxacensis
- Euselasia onorata (Hewitson, 1869) present in Ecuador, Costa Rica and Colombia
- Euselasia opalescens (Hewitson, [1855]) present in French Guiana, Bolivia, Ecuador, Brazil and Peru
- Euselasia opalina (Westwood, 1851) present in Brazil
- Euselasia opimia Stichel, 1919 present in Bolivia
- Euselasia orba Stichel, 1919 present in Brazil
- Euselasia orion Le Cerf, 1958 present in Colombia
- Euselasia orfita (Cramer, 1777) present in French Guiana, Guyana, Suriname, Ecuador, Bolivia and Brazil
- Euselasia palla Hall & Willmott, 1998 present in Ecuador
- Euselasia pance Callaghan, 1999 present in Colombia
- Euselasia parca Stichel, 1919 present in Brazil
- Euselasia pellonia Stichel, 1919 present in Brazil and Peru
- Euselasia pelor (Hewitson, [1853]) present in Brazil
- Euselasia pellos Stichel, 1919 present in Brazil
- Euselasia perisama Hall & Lamas, 2001 present in Peru
- Euselasia phedica (Boisduval, [1836]) present in French Guiana
- Euselasia phelina (H. Druce, 1878) present in French Guiana, Venezuela, Brazil and Peru
- Euselasia pillaca Hall & Willmott, 1998 present in Ecuador
- Euselasia portentosa Stichel, 1927 present in Costa Rica
- Euselasia praecipua Stichel, 1924 present in Brazil and French Guiana
- Euselasia praeclara (Hewitson, 1869) present in Ecuador
- Euselasia procula (Godman & Salvin, [1885]) present in Mexico, Panama and Costa Rica
- Euselasia pseudomys Callaghan, 1999 present in Brazil
- Euselasia pullata Stichel, 1927 present in Brazil
- Euselasia pusilla (R. Felder, 1869) present in Mexico
- Euselasia rasonea (Schaus, 1902) present in Venezuela and Colombia
- Euselasia rava Stichel, 1928 present in Peru
- Euselasia regipennis (Butler & H. Druce, 1872) present in Mexico and Colombia
- Euselasia rhodogyne (Godman, 1903) present in Panama, Costa Rica, Ecuador and Colombia
- Euselasia rhodon Seitz, 1913 present in Brazil
- Euselasia rubrocilia Lathy, 1926 present in French Guiana
- Euselasia saulina Brévignon, 1996 present in French Guiana
- Euselasia scotinosa Stichel, 1930 present in French Guiana and Brazil
- Euselasia seitzi Lathy, 1926 present in Peru
- Euselasia serapis Stichel, 1919 present in Brazil
- Euselasia sergia (Godman & Salvin, [1885]) present in United States (east coast), Mexico, Panama, Guatemala and Costa Rica
- Euselasia subargentea (Lathy, 1904) present in Costa Rica and Colombia
- Euselasia tarinta (Schaus, 1902) present in Colombia
- Euselasia teleclus (Stoll, 1787) present in French Guiana, Suriname and Ecuador
- Euselasia thaumata Hall & Willmott, 1998 present in Ecuador
- Euselasia thucydides (Fabricius, 1793) present in Brazil
- Euselasia thusnelda Möschler, 1883 present in Suriname
- Euselasia toppini Sharpe, 1915 present in Colombia, Bolivia, Brazil and Peru
- Euselasia uria (Hewitson, [1853]) present in Brazil
- Euselasia urites (Hewitson, [1853]) present in French Guiana and Brazil
- Euselasia utica (Hewitson, [1855]) present in Brazil
- Euselasia uzita (Hewitson, [1853]) present in French Guiana, Guyana, Suriname and Brazil
- Euselasia venezolana Seitz, 1913 present in French Guiana, Venezuela and Colombia
- Euselasia violacea Lathy, 1924 present in Colombia
- Euselasia violetta (Bates, 1868) present in Brazil and French Guiana
- Euselasia waponaka Brévignon, 1996 present in French Guiana
- Euselasia zara (Westwood, 1851) present in Brazil
- Euselasia zena (Hewitson, 1860) present in French Guiana, Colombia, Brazil and Peru
