= Beauty mark (disambiguation) =

A beauty mark is a type of mole considered attractive in some cultures. It can also refer to:

- "Beauty Mark", a track on the 1998 album Rufus Wainwright
- Beauty Mark, a 2017 American drama film
- Beauty Marks (album), a 2019 album by Ciara
- "Beauty Marked", the 34th episode of the TV series Danny Phantom

== See also ==
- Rhetus periander, a type of butterfly called the Periander Metalmark or Variable Beautymar
