= Inside the Rain =

- Film poster
- Directed by: Aaron Fisher
- Written by: Aaron Fisher
- Produced by: George LaVoo
- Starring: Aaron Fisher
- Cinematography: Josh Fisher
- Edited by: Aaron Fisher; Esteban Uribe
- Production companies: Act III; Killer Films
- Distributed by: Sky Island Films
- Release date: October 2019 (Woodstock)
- Running time: 90 minutes
- Country: United States
- Language: English
- Budget: $1 million
- Box office: $8,140

Inside the Rain is a 2019 American romantic comedy-drama film written and directed by and starring Aaron Fisher. It is Fisher's feature directorial debut.

== Cast ==
- Aaron Fisher
- Ellen Toland
- Eric Roberts
- Paul Schulze
- Catherine Curtin
- Rosie Perez
- Rita Raider
- Katie Claire McGrath
- Kerri Romeo (as Kerri Sohn)

== Release ==
The film premiered at the Woodstock Film Festival in October 2019.

== Reception ==
The film has an 86% rating on Rotten Tomatoes based on 22 reviews with an average rating of 6.5/10. Tara McNamara of Common Sense Media awarded the film three stars out of five. Joe Leydon of Variety gave the film a positive review and wrote, "Aaron Fisher’s semi-autobiographical dramedy about a manic depressive film student gracefully maneuvers through a fair share of mood swings."

John DeFore of The Hollywood Reporter gave the film a negative review and wrote, "While some who share his struggles may be happy to see Fisher telling his own story here, very little in the self-portrait rings true."
