= Catherine Curtin =

American actress

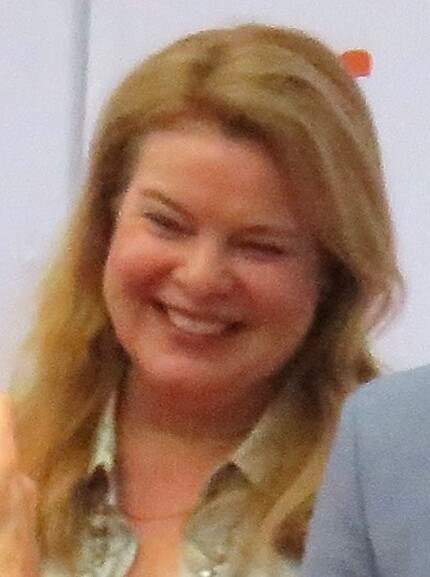
- Curtin at the Toronto International Film Festival premiere of Bad Education (2019)
- Other name: Cathy Curtin
- Occupation: Actress
- Years active: 1990–present

Catherine Curtin is an American actress. She is best known for her role as correctional officer Wanda Bell in the Netflix comedy-drama series Orange Is the New Black (2013–2019). Other notable recurring roles include Insecure, Stranger Things, and Homeland.

Her film credits include Extremely Loud & Incredibly Close (2011), The Bourne Legacy (2011), The Wolf of Wall Street (2013), Catfight (2016), The Light of the Moon (2017), Beauty Mark (2017), Bad Education (2019), Worth (2020), The Half of It (2020), Chemical Hearts (2020), Werewolves Within (2020), Red Pill (2021), Bad Shabbos (2024), and Saturday Night (2024).

== Life and career ==
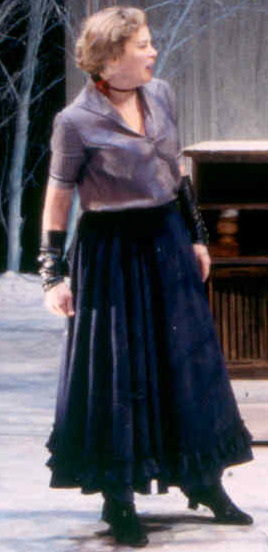
Curtin onstage in 2002

Curtin made her Broadway debut in the original production of Six Degrees of Separation. The following years, she appeared in many Off-Broadway productions, including the title role of Janis Joplin in Love, Janis, for which she was nominated for a Joseph Jefferson Award.

On television, Curtin appeared in episodes of New York Undercover, Sex and the City, Law & Order, and 30 Rock. In 2013, she was cast in a recurring role as correctional officer Wanda Bell on the Netflix comedy-drama series Orange Is the New Black. Along with cast, she won two Screen Actors Guild Award for Outstanding Performance by an Ensemble in a Comedy Series in 2015 and 2016. She left the series in 2017 and returned for multiple episodes of the final season in 2019. From 2016 to 2018, she had a recurring role on the HBO comedy series Insecure. In 2017, she began a recurring role as Dustin's mother Claudia Henderson in the Netflix horror series Stranger Things. In 2018, she played Sandy Langmore on the seventh season of Showtime drama Homeland.

Curtin has played supporting roles in a number of films, including Extremely Loud & Incredibly Close (2011), The Bourne Legacy (2011), The Wolf of Wall Street (2013), Catfight (2016), The Light of the Moon (2017), Beauty Mark (2017), Bad Education (2019), Worth (2020), The Half of It (2020), Chemical Hearts (2020), Werewolves Within (2020), Red Pill (2021), Bad Shabbos (2024), Regarding Us (2024), and Saturday Night (2024).

== Filmography ==
=== Film ===
Year	Title	Role	Notes
1995	Suspicions	Bridgette	
1996	Ed's Next Move	Anne	
1999	Raising the Stakes	Theresa	
2001	The Next Big Thing	"Weltanschauung" Woman	
2002	Unconditional Love	Woman Chosen for Show	
2003	The Look	Denise	
2003	Happy End	Beatrix	
2006	The Limbo Room	Bryce	
2007	Noise	Barbara	
2008	Revolutionary Road	Woman in Audience	
2011	Extremely Loud & Incredibly Close	Leigh-Anne Black	
2012	A Wife Alone	Holly	
2012	The Bourne Legacy	C-Team	
2013	Bert & Annie's Guide to Friendship	Melody	
2013	The Wolf of Wall Street	FBI Agent	
2016	Catfight	Carl's Wife	
2017	The Light of the Moon	Kirra	
2017	Crazy Famous	Mrs. Marcus	
2017	Maggie Black	Dr. Leitman	
2017	Camera Obscura	Det. Dawson	
2017	Beauty Mark	Ruth Ann Simms	
2017	Cut Shoot Kill	Molly	
2017	Gold Star	Deanne	
2018	Breaking Brooklyn	Principal Carver	
2018	Loveitis	Cindy	
2019	Blush	Gail	
2019	MAD?	Simone	
2019	The Artist's Wife	Joyce	
2019	Bad Education	Judy Shapiro	
2019	The Lost Weekend	Aunt Janice	Short film
2019	Inside the Rain	Nancy Glass	
2020	Worth	Joan	
2020	The Half of It	Colleen Munsky	
2020	Chemical Hearts	Sarah	
2020	A Shot Through the Wall	Cynthia Kostas	
2020	The Surrogate	Sarah	
2020	Triple Threat	Audrey Williamson	
2020	What Breaks the Ice	Elaine	
2021	Werewolves Within	Jeanine	
2021	Red Pill	Mercy	
2021	18½	Lena	
2023	Founders Day	Commissioner Peterson	
2024	Regarding Us	Betsy Holand	
2024	Bad Shabbos	Beth	
2024	The Easy Kind	Meg	
2024	Saturday Night	Joan Carbunkle	
2025	Pretty Thing	Peggy	
2026	Plucked	Maggie	

=== Television ===
Year	Title	Role	Notes
1997	Guiding Light	Fran	TV series
2000	Sex and the City	Girl #2	Episode: "Frenemies"
2000, 2008	Law & Order	Stephanie Hollis, Julie Liscomb	Episodes: "Panic", "Tango"
2002	Third Watch	Zebra	Episode: "Falling"
2006	Law & Order: Criminal Intent	Jenna Switzer	Episode: "Masquerade"
2007–2009	The Naked Brothers Band	Betty	Recurring role
2011	Bestsellers	Abby	Main role
2013–2017, 2019	Orange Is the New Black	Wanda Bell	Recurring role, 40 episodes Screen Actors Guild Award for Outstanding Performance by an Ensemble in a Comedy Series (2015, 2016)
2014	The Leftovers	Mrs. Tunney	Episode: "Pilot"
2015	Fan Girl	Miss Stacy	TV film
2015, 2017	Unbreakable Kimmy Schmidt	Administrator, Coach Tannen	Episodes: "Kimmy Kisses a Boy!", "Kimmy Goes to College!"
2016	Casting	Natalie	TV film
2016	Bull	Joyce Magruder	Episode: "Light My Fire"
2016	The Pearl	Cathy Pearl	TV film
2016–2018	Insecure	Joanne	Recurring role, 11 episodes
2017	Changelings	Det. Francine Vincent	Episode: "Aswang"
2017	Blue Bloods	Ruth Bukowski	Episode: "Lost Souls"
2017	Mindhunter	Ruth Barnwright	Episode: "1.5"
2017–2025	Stranger Things	Claudia Henderson	Recurring role (season 2 & 4), guest (season 3 & 5), 12 episodes Nominated – Screen Actors Guild Award for Outstanding Performance by an Ensemble in a Drama Series (2018)
2018	Homeland	Sandy Langmore	Recurring role (season 7), 7 episodes
2019	Mommy Blogger	Darby	Episode: "Our Homeschool Adventure"
2019	Surveillance	Amy Faltin	
