= Harris Doran =

American filmmaker and actor (born 1978)

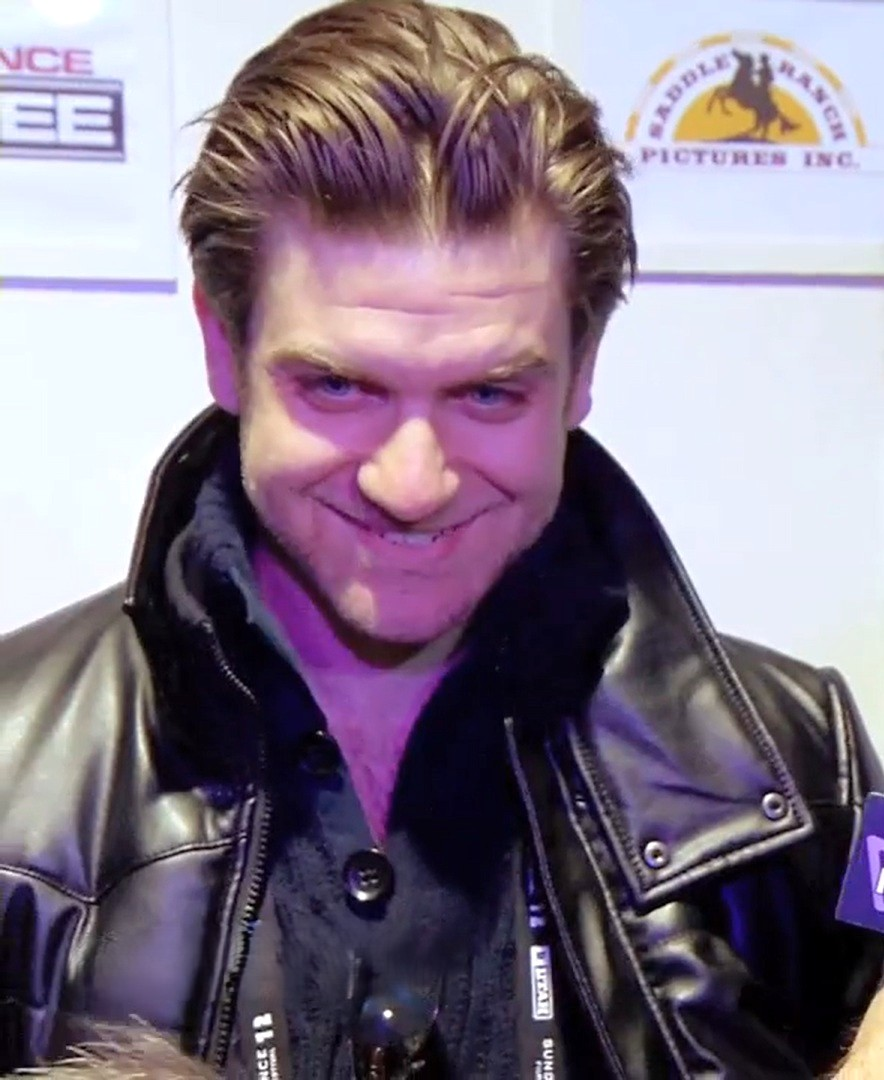
- Doran in 2012
- Born: June 2, 1978 (age 48); Flushing, New York, U.S.
- Education: Juilliard School
- Occupations: Film director, screenwriter, actor, producer

Harris Doran (born June 2, 1978) is an American independent film writer, director, actor, and producer.

== Early life and education ==
Doran attended the Fiorello H. LaGuardia High School of Music and Arts and the Performing Arts and went on to study at the Juilliard School.

== Career ==
Doran started his career as an actor, where he played "The Artful Dodger" in Oliver! at Deaf West Theatre for which he received an Ovation Award nomination. He played "Claude" on Broadway in the Actors Fund of America concert of Hair. Doran won a New York Musical Theatre Festival Award for Outstanding Individual Performance for his work in the Off-Broadway play "Love Jerry". He played "Ham" in the out-of-town try-out of the stage adaptation of Harry Connick Jr's The Happy Elf. He played "Miles" in the Off-Broadway play "It Must Be Him, and "Marc" in the world premiere of Mike Reiss's play "I'm Connecticut".

In 2014, Doran wrote and directed the short film "The Story of Milo & Annie," starring Cathy Moriarty which won Best Narrative Short in the Indie Memphis Film Festival. He was a writer on Lifetime's "I Love You... But I Lied."

In 2017, Doran wrote and directed the feature film Beauty Mark, which premiered as a US competition film in the LA Film Festival. The film was released in 2018 by The Orchard.

In 2020, Doran directed the podcast production of "Bleeding Love" and the film "I See You and You See Me" for Queens Theatre which premiered on PBS. He edited the podcast movie Ghostwriter, starring Kate Mara and Adam Scott.

In 2022, Doran wrote and directed the short film F^¢k 'Em Right B@¢k, Starring Kara Young, which premiered at The Sundance Film Festival, and won Best Comedy Short Film at the Aspen Shortsfest, making it qualify for the Academy Awards.

In 2023, he produced the documentary feature film Kokomo City which premiered at the 2023 Sundance Film Festival where the film won the NEXT Innovator Award, the NEXT Audience Award, and the Panorama Audience Award at the Berlin International Film Festival. Doran was nominated for an Independent Spirit Award for producing the film.

In 2024, he wrote and directed the short film 8 Minutes 20 seconds, and in 2025 he wrote and directed the short film Poreless, which premiered at the Tribeca Film Festival, and became qualified for the Academy Awards.

== Filmography ==
Year	Title	Director	Writer	Producer	Notes
2014	The Story of Milo & Annie	Yes	Yes	Yes	Short film
2015	Photo Op	No	No	Yes	Short film
2015	This Movie Will Get Into Sundance	Yes	Yes	Yes	
2018	Beauty Mark	Yes	Yes	Yes	
2021	I See You and You See Me	Yes	Yes	Yes	
2022	F^¢k 'Em R!ght B@¢k	Yes	Yes	Yes	Short film
2023	Kokomo City	No	No	Yes	
2024	8 Minutes 20 Seconds	Yes	Yes	Yes	Short film
2025	Poreless	Yes	Yes	Yes	Short film
