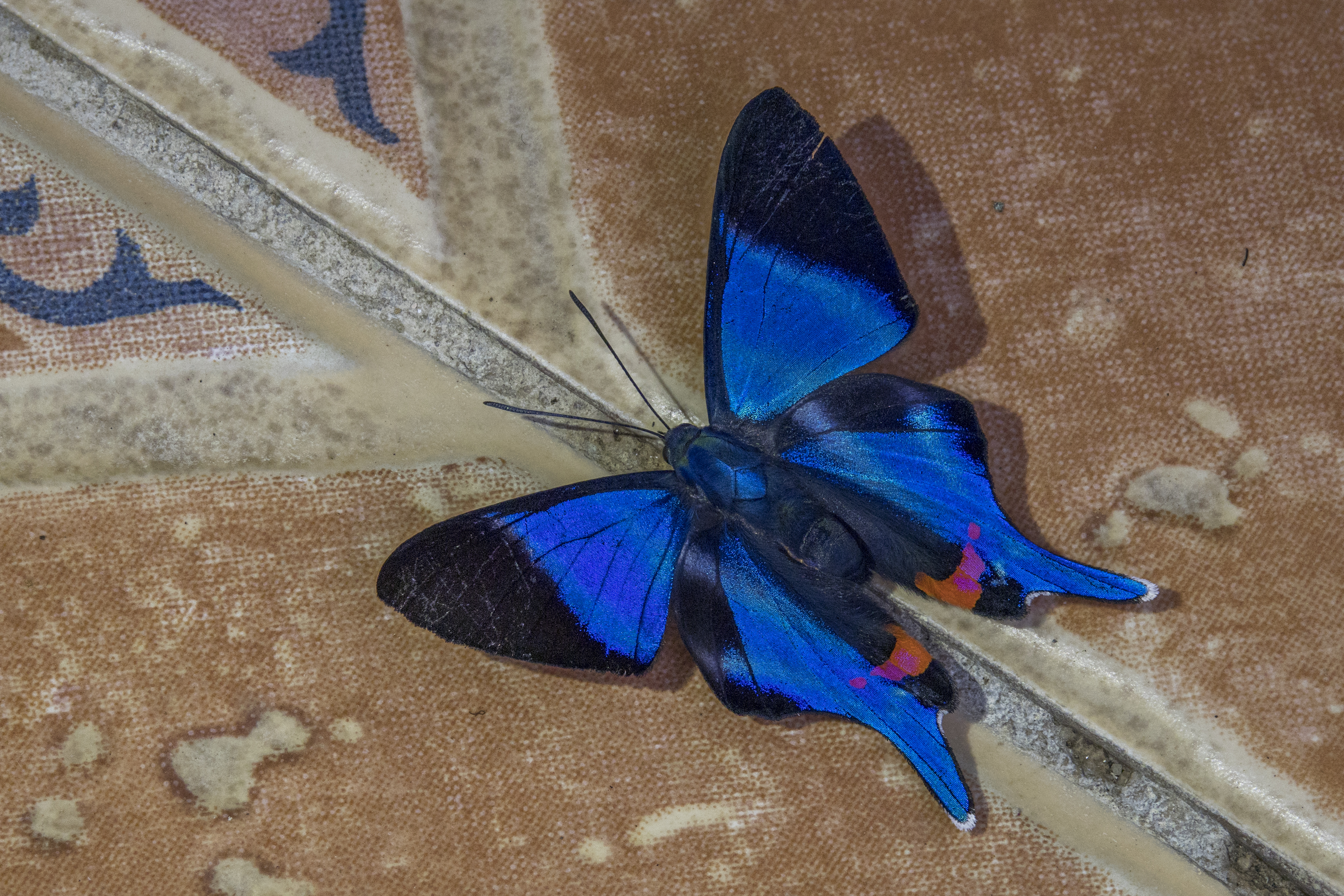
- R. dysonii, Ecuador

Scientific classification
- Domain: Eukaryota
- Kingdom: Animalia
- Phylum: Arthropoda
- Class: Insecta
- Order: Lepidoptera
- Family: Riodinidae
- Tribe: Riodinini
- Genus: Rhetus; Swainson, [1829]

Species
- See text

Synonyms
- Diorina Morisse, [1838]

= Rhetus =

Genus of butterflies

Rhetus is a Neotropical metalmark butterfly genus. They are small (wingspan 25–30 mm), fast-flying, and strikingly iridescent, and have long wing tails. They are found in open areas, including tracks of primary rainforest.

The genus was erected by William Swainson in 1829. In older literature, all three species were placed in the genus Diorina Morisse 1838 currently viewed as a subjective junior synonym, the older name having priority.

Rhetus periander often features in butterfly wall displays.

== Species ==
The three species are:

- Rhetus arcius (Linnaeus, 1763) – paler than R. periander and with longer thinner tails
- Rhetus dysonii (Saunders, 1850) – outer margins of the forewings convex, distinct white bands, and white markings on the tail
- Rhetus periander (Cramer, [1777]) – commonest and most widespread
