= Regarding Us =

2024 drama film written by David Beck and Jennifer Bobbi

- Theatrical release poster
- Directed by: David Beck; Jennifer Bobbi
- Written by: David Beck; Jennifer Bobbi
- Produced by: Catriona Rubenis-Stevens; David Beck; Alexandra Grey
- Starring: Alexandra Grey; David Beck; Andrea Rosa Guzman; Eluid Garcia Kauffman; Jacob Moran; Hudson Paul; Fiona Morgan Quinn; Abigail Hawk; Catherine Curtin
- Cinematography: Caroline Stucky
- Edited by: Sarah Krusen
- Music by: Analia Lentini
- Production companies: The Great Griffon; Half-Light Productions; Terasem Media and Films
- Distributed by: Gravitas Ventures
- Release date: 2024
- Running time: 99 minutes
- Country: United States

Regarding Us is a 2024 American inspirational drama film written and directed by David Beck and Jennifer Bobbi in their feature film debut. The film was inspired by both lives of the writers, including Beck's Catholic high school English teacher, who was fired in 2020 for being gay.

== Synopsis ==
After seven years, Veronica Hathaway loses her teaching job at a Catholic school for being transgender. She falls into depression and suicidal thoughts until she meets Isabel, a precocious young girl with two fathers in marital strife, and they have a profound impact on each other's lives. Matters are complicated when Isabel helps Kyle, a new student in her class from Alabama, explore his own gender identity.

== Cast ==
- Alexandra Grey as Veronica Hathaway
- David Beck as Denny
- Andrea Rosa Guzman as Isabel Ramirez
- Jacob Moran as Matt
- Hudson Paul as Kyle
- Fiona Morgan Quinn as Carmen
- Abigail Hawk as Constance
- Catherine Curtin as Betsy
- Eliud Garcia Kauffman as Adrian Ramirez
- Matt W. Cody as Ben
- Jason A. Coombs as Mr. Aquino
- Michael Miguel as Eddie
- Jennifer Bobbi as Ruthi
- Nicolas Murphy Dubey as Alice, The Casting Director
- Nikolas Plesnarski as Cooper
- Zoe Van Tieghem as Amber
- Chandi Moore as Michaela
- Ebony Marshall-Oliver as Principal Ford

== Release ==
The film premiered in Los Angeles at TCL Chinese Theater with Dances with Films, sponsored by Outfest on June 27, 2024. It was distributed by Gravitas Ventures and had a limited theatrical release in New York December 6–12. On January 28th, 2025, it became available VOD on Apple TV+ and Amazon Prime, and on April 1, it became available to stream on Tubi and multiple other platforms. Virgin Atlantic Airlines picked the film up June 1. The screenplay has been included in the permanent Core Collection at the Library of the Academy of Motion Picture Arts & Sciences.

== Reception ==
On the review aggregator website Rotten Tomatoes, 91% of 11 critics' reviews are positive.

Avi Offer of NYC Movie Guru gave the film a glowing review, praising Beck and Bobbi's screenplay and direction: "Regarding Us remains refreshingly un-Hollywood. It's sweet without being cloying, poignant without being emotionally devastating or maudlin, uplifting without being cheesy, and wise without being preachy or heavy-handed...the performances by the ensemble cast are all superb."

Terry Sherwood of Film Threat, giving the film 8 out of 10 stars, writes: "The film finds its drama in the quiet moments of connection and self-discovery." Monique Jones of Common Sense Media also recommended the film, giving it 4 out of 5 stars, calling it "a sweet drama that offers glimmers of hope for anyone growing up amid too many people who have yet to learn how to truly accept others." Joseph Robinson and Nicholas Bell in their video review for Fish Jelly Films stated that the movie is "unexpectedly poignant...Regarding Us is a heartwarming throwback to 90s queer cinema", mentioning the highlights of the film were the lead performances by Grey, Guzman, and Beck, while mildly criticizing the film for its "inevitable rough edges" and occasional moments of melodrama.

Gary M. Kramer of Philadelphia Gay News negatively criticized the film overall, calling it "ambitious" and "contrived", but pointed out Grey's nuanced performance as Veronica: "She takes the high road in many of the situations she encounters, which make her admirable, and when she takes a moment to compose herself, moving away from Isabel after being triggered by something, it is poignant and revealing. Grey imbues Veronica with vulnerability and strength that keep viewers rapt."
