= Saturday Night Live 25th Anniversary Special =

1999 television episode

- Saturday Night Live episode
- Directed by: Beth McCarthy-Miller
- Narrated by: Don Pardo
- Original air date: September 26, 1999
- Running time: 161 minutes

"Saturday Night Live 25th Anniversary Special" (also billed as "Saturday Night Live 25") is a three-hour prime-time special that aired on September 26, 1999, on NBC, celebrating Saturday Night Live's 25th year on the air, having premiered on October 11, 1975, under the original title NBC's Saturday Night. The New York Times wrote of the special, "In defiance of both time and show business convention, SNL is still the most pervasive influence on the art of comedy in contemporary culture."

This special was preceded by the 15th Anniversary Special (1989) and succeeded by the 40th Anniversary Special (2015). The 25th special received five Primetime Emmy Award nominations including a win for the Outstanding Variety, Music or Comedy Special and a Writers Guild of America Award for Television: Best Comedy/Variety – Specials.

== Synopsis ==
=== Summary ===
Sketch	Notes
Cold Open	Bill Murray (as Nick the Lounge Singer) and Paul Shaffer open the show with a musical melody and talks to audience members Jerry Seinfeld, Michael Douglas, Catherine Zeta-Jones, Drew Barrymore and Garrett Morris. Dan Aykroyd and Laraine Newman appear as Mr. Chief Redsky and his niece Natasha.
Opening Monologue	Chris Rock delivers the opening monologue
Schmitt's Gay sketch	Encore presentation of the pre-taped sketch featuring Adam Sandler and Chris Farley.
"Questions from the Audience" segment	Tom Hanks answers questions from the audience including Garth Brooks, Jon Lovitz, Christopher Walken, Sarah Michelle Gellar, James Van Der Beek, and Victoria Jackson.
1995 to 1999 montage	As he ends his monologue, Hanks introduces a montage of the current SNL cast from 1995 to 1999.
1975-1980 "Musical Highlights" montage	Paul Simon introduces a musical highlights montage of the SNL years from 1975 to 1980.
Tribute to the First 5 Years of SNL	The Three Amigos reunion with Steve Martin, Martin Short and Chevy Chase reunite to present a tribute to the first 5 years of SNL from 1975 to 1980 (The Not Ready for Prime Time Players).
Tribute to John Belushi	Dan Aykroyd and Laraine Newman present a tribute to fellow cast member John Belushi.
Musical performance	Jerry Seinfeld and David Bowie introduce Eurythmics as they are the respective host and musical guest for the following weekend.
Tribute to Gilda Radner	Molly Shannon and Cheri Oteri present a tribute to original cast member Gilda Radner.
Tribute to the writers	Adam Sandler, Jim Downey, Robert Smigel, and Tim Hurley present a tribute to the writers.
1980-1990 "Musical Highlights" montage	Sandler introduces a musical highlights montage of the SNL years from 1980 to 1990.
Audience interaction	Billy Crystal reprises his role as Fernando Lamas and makes jokes towards Steve Martin, Chris Rock, Susan Sarandon, Gary Busey, Glenn Close, Susan Saint James, David Cone, David Wells, Danny DeVito, and Joe Disco.
1980 to 1985 montage	Crystal (still as Fernando Lamas) introduces a montage of the SNL years from the 1980 to 1985 Dick Ebersol-produced era.
Dr. Evil Sketch	Mike Myers, Lorne Michaels, Tim Meadows, Kevin Spacey, and Verne Troyer act in a pre-taped sketch where they discuss the similarities between Dr. Evil and Michaels.
Montage of clips 1985-1990	Mike Myers introduces a montage of the SNL years from 1985 to 1990.
Tribute to Phil Hartman	Mike Myers, Jon Lovitz, Jan Hooks, Victoria Jackson, Kevin Nealon, Nora Dunn, and Dennis Miller present a tribute to Hartman featuring the pre-taped short film “Love is a Dream” featuring Hartman and Hooks.
1990-1999 "Musical Highlights" montage	Sting and Steven Tyler introduce a musical highlights montage of the SNL years from 1990 to 1999.
Montage of clips 1990-1995	Lily Tomlin and Candice Bergen present a montage of SNL clips from 1990 to 1995.
Tribute to Chris Farley	David Spade presents a tribute to friend and former cast member Chris Farley.
Musical performance	Will Ferrell and Ana Gasteyer reprise their roles as Marty and Bobbi Mohan-Culp, before announcing a musical performance by Beastie Boys, who are joined by Elvis Costello to perform Radio Radio.
Weekend Update tribute	Chevy Chase, Dennis Miller, and Norm Macdonald introduce a montage of Weekend Update clips.
"TV Funhouse" cartoon	Alec Baldwin introduces a new TV Funhouse cartoon by Robert Smigel honoring Lorne Michaels.
Musical performance	Garrett Morris and Tim Meadows introduce Rev. Al Green who sings "Let's Stay Together".
SNL Goodbyes	Dan Aykroyd, Jon Lovitz, and John Goodman invite the cast and crew to take a photo on stage

A pre-taped sketch with Dana Carvey and Kevin Nealon reprising their roles as Hans and Franz was cut due to time-constraints. It would later air in the season 25 episode hosted by Heather Graham.

=== Musical performances ===
The show included musical performances by:

- Eurythmics, introduced by Jerry Seinfeld and David Bowie, performed "Here Comes the Rain Again".
- The Beastie Boys begin a performance of "Sabotage" before being interrupted by Elvis Costello who joins them in a performance of "Radio Radio", spoofing the Costello's appearance in 1977 where his band began to perform "Less Than Zero", before stopping abruptly and instead leading into a performance of Radio Radio against the wishes of his record company and SNL.
- Al Green, introduced by Garrett Morris and Tim Meadows, performs "Let's Stay Together".

=== In Memoriam ===
Throughout the show following were paid tribute to:

- John Belushi
- Chris Farley
- Phil Hartman
- Gilda Radner
- Michael O'Donoghue
- Danitra Vance

== Participants ==
All performers were credited as repertory:

- Dan Aykroyd
- Alec Baldwin
- Candice Bergen
- David Bowie
- Garth Brooks
- Dana Carvey (credit only)
- Chevy Chase
- Billy Crystal
- Will Ferrell
- Al Franken
- Ana Gasteyer
- Sarah Michelle Gellar
- John Goodman
- Tom Hanks
- Jan Hooks
- Victoria Jackson
- Jon Lovitz
- Steve Martin
- Tim Meadows
- Dennis Miller
- Garret Morris
- Bill Murray
- Mike Myers
- Kevin Nealon
- Laraine Newman
- Conan O'Brien (credit only)
- Cheri Oteri
- Chris Rock
- Adam Sandler
- Jerry Seinfeld
- Molly Shannon
- Martin Short
- Paul Simon
- Kevin Spacey
- David Spade
- Sting
- Lily Tomlin
- Steve Tyler
- James Van Der Beek
- Christopher Walken

== Audience members ==
Also in attendance included numerous actors, musicians, comedians, and celebrities such as:

- Tom Arnold
- Drew Barrymore
- Steve Buscemi
- Glenn Close
- Danny DeVito
- Michael Douglas
- Whoopi Goldberg
- Gilbert Gottfried
- Darrell Hammond
- Chris Kattan
- Michael Keaton
- Robert Klein
- David Koechner
- Nathan Lane
- Penny Marshall
- John McEnroe
- Tracy Morgan
- Ric Ocasek
- Conan O’Brien
- Rhea Perlman
- Bernadette Peters
- Joe Piscapo
- Ray Romano
- Andy Richter
- Susan Sarandon
- Rob Schneider
- Sting
- Susan Saint James
- Patrick Stewart
- Steven Tyler
- Fred Willard
- Catherine Zeta-Jones

== Awards and nominations ==
Year	Award	Category	Nominated work	Result	Ref.
2000	Directors Guild of America Awards	Outstanding Directorial Achievement in Musical/Variety	Beth McCarthy-Miller	Nominated	
2000	Primetime Emmy Awards	Outstanding Variety, Music or Comedy Special	Saturday Night Live 25th Anniversary Special	Won	
2000	Primetime Emmy Awards	Outstanding Directing for a Variety or Music Program	Beth McCarthy-Miller	Nominated	
2000	Primetime Emmy Awards	Outstanding Art Direction for a Variety or Music Program	N. Joseph DeTullio, Eugene Lee, Keith Ian Raywood, and Akira Yoshimura	Nominated	
2000	Primetime Emmy Awards	Outstanding Technical Direction, Camerawork, Video for a Special	Michael Bennett, Steven Cimino, Carl Eckett, Eric A. Eisenstein, Frank Grisanti, Jan Kasoff, James Mott, Stephen Murello, Susan Noll, and John Pinto	Nominated	
2000	Primetime Emmy Awards	Outstanding Sound Mixing for a Variety Series or Special	Robert Palladino, Bill Taylor, Chris Seeger, Marty Brumbach, and Jay Vicari	Nominated	
2001	Writers Guild of America Awards	Best Comedy/Variety – Specials	Tina Fey, Anne Beatts, Tom Davis, Steve Higgins, Lorne Michaels, Marilyn Suzanne Miller, Paula Pell, Paul Shaffer, T. Sean Shannon, Michael Shoemaker, and Robert Smigel	Won	

== Ratings ==
The special drew 22.15 million viewers which was the 3rd-most watched program of the week behind the season premieres of Friends and Frasier.
