= Audrey Peart Dickman =

British-American television producer

- Born: Lilian Audrey Joan Peart; November 29, 1927; London, England, UK
- Died: July 16, 2001 (aged 73); Middletown, New Jersey, US
- Occupation: Television producer
- Years active: 1968–1998
- Known for: Saturday Night Live

Lilian Audrey Joan Peart Dickman (November 29, 1927 – July 16, 2001) was a British-born American television producer, best known for her work on the first eighteen years of Saturday Night Live.

== Early life and education ==
Peart was born in London, the daughter of William George Peart and Alice Agnes Stannard Peart. Her father, a labourer, was in the Royal Navy Volunteer Reserve during World War I; he was also enlisted to serve in World War II.

== Career ==
Dickman worked in American television from 1968, beginning as a production assistant on The Kraft Music Hall variety program. She worked with Jim Henson on two Muppets specials, before Dickman and Henson both became involved in the NBC late night sketch program Saturday Night Live (SNL). Dickman was at the auditions for the first cast, and stayed with SNL for eighteen seasons, in various producer roles. Jane Curtin played a character named "Audrey Peart Dickman" in several sketches. Dick Ebersol considered her one of the few "adults" in the show's early days; she was seventeen years older than Lorne Michaels, and at least 20 years older than many of the young writers and performers.

During and after her time working on SNL, Dickman produced compilations focusing on various cast members; her last of these was a collection of Phil Hartman's best sketches, released in 1998.

== Television and video productions ==
- The Kraft Music Hall (1968–1970)
- Singer Presents Burt Bacharach (1971)
- Acts of Love and Other Comedies (1973)
- The Muppets Valentine Show (1974)
- The Muppet Show: Sex and Violence (1975)
- Happy Endings (1975)
- Saturday Night Live (1975–1993, various producer roles)
- Bob & Ray, Jane, Laraine, & Gilda (1979, associate producer)
- The Best of John Belushi (1985, associate producer)
- The Best of Dan Aykroyd (1986, associate producer)
- The 40th Annual Primetime Emmy Awards (1988, production consultant)
- Saturday Night Live: The Best of Robin Williams (1991, coordinating producer)
- Best of Saturday Night Live: Special Edition (1992, coordinating producer)
- Saturday Night Live: The Best of Phil Hartman (1998, coordinating producer)

== Personal life and legacy ==
Peart married Bernard N. Dickman in 1971. She died in 2001, at the age of 73, at her home in Middletown Township, New Jersey. In May 2002, there was a memorial gathering of about 150 members of the casts and crew of SNL at Studio 8H, because "Dickman occupied a special place in the hearts of the show's cast and crew for more than two decades." She was included in the "In Memoriam" segment of the Saturday Night Live 40th Anniversary Special in 2015. In 2024, Dickman was portrayed by actress Kirsty Woodward in the Jason Reitman film Saturday Night.
