= Saturday Night Live 15th Anniversary Special =

1989 episode of Saturday Night Live

- Saturday Night Live episode
- Directed by: Dave Wilson
- Narrated by: Don Pardo
- Original air date: September 24, 1989
- Running time: 143 minutes

"Saturday Night Live 15th Anniversary Special" (also billed as "Saturday Night Live 15") is a 2½ hour prime-time special that aired on September 24, 1989, on NBC, celebrating Saturday Night Live's 15th year on the air, having premiered on October 11, 1975, under the original title NBC's Saturday Night. SNL has since had three more specials celebrating its 25th Anniversary in 1999, its 40th Anniversary in 2015, and its 50th Anniversary in 2025.

The 15th Anniversary Special featured montage clips, tributes and performances from Dan Aykroyd, Jim Belushi, Chevy Chase, Billy Crystal, Jane Curtin, Tom Hanks, Buck Henry, Steve Martin, Laraine Newman, Mary Tyler Moore, Martin Short, O.J. Simpson and Robin Williams with musical performances from Prince and Paul Simon.

== Synopsis ==
=== Summary ===
Sketch	Notes
Cold Open	Kevin Nealon and Victoria Jackson overhear comedians Dan Aykroyd, Billy Crystal, Tom Hanks, Steve Martin, and Robin Williams talking about their film projects. We then see Don Novello as Father Guido Sarducci talking to Nora Dunn, Joan Cusack chatting with Sam Kinison, and Mary Tyler Moore making out with Jon Lovitz. It cuts to Chevy Chase trying to convince Lorne Michaels, Jane Curtin, and Joe Piscopo that he can still do pratfalls at his age. Chevy walks into the studio audience forced to wear a football helmet. He trips over Diane Sawyer, drops popcorn over Donald Trump's head, talks to Garrett Morris, and falls down a flight of stairs before saying "Live from New York, It's Saturday Night".
Opening Monologue	Tom Hanks gives the opening monologue welcoming the audience to the special.
1975 to 1980 montage	As he ends his monologue, Hanks introduces a montage of the SNL years from 1975 to 1980 (The Not Ready for Prime Time Players).
SNL Moment	Susan Saint James talks about her marriage to Dick Ebersol.
1980 to 1985 montage	Christopher Guest and Martin Short introduce a montage of the SNL years from 1980 to 1985.
SNL Moment	O.J. Simpson talks about hosting SNL in 1977.
1985 to 1989 montage	Steve Martin and Buck Henry introduce a montage of the SNL years from 1985 to 1989.
SNL Moment	Charlton Heston reads an angry audience letter written by Heston.
"Musical moments" montage	Billy Crystal makes jokes at the expense of Donald Trump, Old-Timers' Day, and Mickey Mantle before he introduces the musical moments montage.
Tribute to Gilda Radner	Jane Curtin and Laraine Newman introduce a tribute to former cast member Gilda Radner.
"Political moments" montage	Dennis Miller introduces the montage to Weekend Update and political moments of SNL.
SNL Moment	Jan Hooks talks about portraying four whores in one night on SNL.
"Tasteless Sketches" montage	Mary Tyler Moore and Eddie Murphy's entourage introduce the SNL montage to tasteless sketches.
Tribute to John Belushi	Dan Aykroyd and Jim Belushi introduce a tribute to former cast member John Belushi.
Audience interaction	Robin Williams is sent out to stall for time. He walks into the audience making jokes at the expense of Edwin Newman, Dick Ebersol, Sam Kinison, Dana Carvey, Glenn Close, Phil Hartman, Joe Piscopo, Gary Busey, Art Garfunkel, Steve Martin, Elliott Gould, and Joe Disco.
SNL Goodbyes	Bruce Willis closes the special, reminding audiences he will host the show the following week.

=== Musical performers ===
- Prince, introduced by Jerry Hall performed "Electric Chair"
- Paul Simon performed "Still Crazy After All These Years"

=== Tributes ===
- John Belushi, introduced by Dan Aykroyd and Jim Belushi
- Gilda Radner, introduced by Jane Curtin and Laraine Newman

== Participants ==
All performers were credited as repertory:

- Dan Aykroyd
- Jim Belushi
- Chevy Chase
- Billy Crystal
- Jane Curtin
- Joan Cusack
- Christopher Guest
- Jerry Hall
- Tom Hanks
- Buck Henry
- Charlton Heston
- Sam Kinison
- Steve Martin
- Dennis Miller
- Mary Tyler Moore
- Garrett Morris
- Eddie Murphy's entourage
- Laraine Newman
- Don Novello as Father Guido Sarducci
- Joe Piscopo
- Susan Saint James
- Martin Short
- O.J. Simpson
- Robin Williams

== Audience Members ==
Also in attendance included numerous actors, musicians, comedians, and celebrities such as:

- Gary Busey
- Dana Carvey
- Glenn Close
- Jim Downey
- Denny Dillon
- Nora Dunn
- Dick Ebersol
- Eric Idle
- Art Garfunkel
- Elliott Gould
- Gilbert Gottfried
- Kathy Griffin
- Phil Hartman
- Tim Kazurinsky
- Robert Klein
- Eugene Levy
- Lorne Michaels
- Edwin Newman
- Catherine O'Hara
- Mike Myers
- Kurt Russell
- Diane Sawyer
- Paul Shaffer
- Garry Shandling
- Harry Shearer
- G.E. Smith
- Brandon Tartikoff
- Donald Trump
- Bruce Willis

== Production ==
The special was SNL's first anniversary celebration; it featured original cast members Chevy Chase, Dan Aykroyd, Jane Curtin, Garrett Morris, and Laraine Newman, with tributes to the late John Belushi and Gilda Radner. Notably absent were former cast members Bill Murray and Eddie Murphy. It was followed by the 25th Anniversary in 1999 and the 40th Anniversary in 2014.

Executive Producer Lorne Michaels stated the reasoning behind the anniversary special: "I think he [NBC Entertainment President Brandon Tartikoff] felt it was time we brought the old and new groups together. I think, perhaps, it also was a little bit the death of Gilda Radner [earlier in 1989] .... I would have resisted the idea before this, but I think this group we've had for the last three years has been well enough praised and good enough to compare with the old group. I think we've reached a sort of peak. I wouldn't have gone along with it if I weren't just as proud of the new group as the old."

== Awards and nominations ==
Year	Award	Category	Nominated work	Result	Ref.
1990	American Comedy Awards	Funniest Female Performer in a TV Special	Jane Curtin	Nominated	
