= Auden Thornton =

American actress

- Born: Houston, Texas, U.S.
- Education: St. John's School; Juilliard School
- Occupation: Actress
- Years active: 1999–present

Auden Thornton is an American actress.

== Life and career ==
Born and raised in Houston, Thornton was a fourth-grader at St. John's School when cast in the film Arlington Road and graduated from the Juilliard School in 2011. In New York City, Thornton began performing in Off-Broadway plays, including Years of Sky and Three Sisters. She also guest starred in a number of television series, include Blue Bloods, The Good Wife, Forever and Elementary.

In 2017, Thornton played a leading role in the critically acclaimed independent drama film Beauty Mark. The film has an 100% approval rating on Rotten Tomatoes. Thornton received positive reviews and won Los Angeles Film Festival Award for Best Breakout Performance. In 2019, she was cast in a recurring role for the fourth season of the NBC family drama series, This Is Us. In 2020, Thornton was cast in the unaired ABC pilot Thirtysomething(else), the sequel to critically acclaimed drama Thirtysomething, in which she played Brittany Weston, the daughter of Elliot Weston (Timothy Busfield) and Nancy Weston (Patricia Wettig).

== Filmography ==
=== Film ===
Year	Title	Role	Notes
1999	Arlington Road	Hannah Lang	
2013	Jack Heart Jump	Claire	Short film
2014	The Longest Week	Woman at Gallery	
2015	True Story	Lena	
2017	Beauty Mark	Angie Simms	Los Angeles Film Festival Award for Best Breakout Performance
2019	Benim	Mari	Short film
2019	The Revolutionaries	Jennifer	Short film
2020	A Phone Call from My Best Friend	Chrissy	Short film
2020	Virtue	Kiki	
2020	Lolita Express	Sarabeth	Short film
2022	Palm Trees and Power Lines	Katie	
2025	Broke	Ali	
2025	Little Lorraine	Emma	
2025	This Tempting Madness	Gemma	

=== Television ===
Year	Title	Role	Notes
2011	Pan Am	Anke	Episode: "Ich Bin Ein Berliner"
2013	Blue Bloods	Angie	Episode: "Unwritten Rules"
2014	The Good Wife	Darla Riggs	Episode: "We, the Juries"
2015	Forever	Sarah Clancy	Episode: "Memories of Murder"
2016	Elementary	Julie Monahan	Episode: "Ready or Not"
2016	Royal Pains	Bree	Episode: "Palpating the Orbital Rim"
2017	Doubt	Gemma Ashford	2 episodes
2018	Bull	Sarah Lynch	Episode: "Keep Your Friends Close"
2019–2020	This Is Us	Lucy Damon	6 episodes
2020	Thirtysomething(else)	Brittany Weston	Unaired pilot
2023	Black Mirror	Jessica Ross	Episode: "Beyond the Sea"
2024	The Equalizer	Sara Conway	Episode: "Blind Justice"
