= Generalissimo Francisco Franco is still dead =

Catchphrase from Saturday Night Live

"Generalissimo Francisco Franco is still dead" is a catchphrase that originated in 1975 during the first season of NBC's Saturday Night (now called Saturday Night Live, or SNL) and which mocked the weeks-long media reports of the impending death of Francisco Franco. It was one of the first catchphrases from the series to enter the general lexicon.

== Origin ==
The death (on November 20, 1975) of Spanish dictator Francisco Franco during the first season of NBC's Saturday Night originated the phrase. Franco's presumed imminent death had been a headline story on NBC News and other news organizations for several weeks. On slow news days, United States network television newscasters sometimes noted that Franco was still alive.

Following Franco's death, Chevy Chase, host of NBC's Saturday Night's comedic news segment Weekend Update, announced Franco's death and read a statement from former president Richard Nixon: "General Franco was a loyal friend and ally of the United States. He earned worldwide respect for Spain through firmness and fairness." As an ironic counterpoint to this, a picture was displayed behind Chase, showing Franco giving the Nazi salute alongside Adolf Hitler.

In subsequent weeks, Chase developed the joke into a parody of the earlier news coverage of Franco's illness, treating his death as the top story. "This breaking news just in", Chase would announce – "Generalissimo Francisco Franco is still dead!" Occasionally, Chase would change the wording slightly in attempts to keep the joke fresh, e.g. "Generalissimo Francisco Franco is still valiantly holding on in his fight to remain dead." The joke was sometimes combined with another running gag in which Garrett Morris, "head of the New York School for the Hard of Hearing" would cup his hands around his mouth and shout the news as Chase read it. The gag ran until early 1977, with occasional callbacks in later seasons.

== Legacy ==
The phrase has remained in use since Franco's death. James Taranto's Best of the Web Today column at OpinionJournal.com used the phrase as a tag for newspaper headlines that indicate something is still happening when it should be obvious. On February 8, 2007, during Jack Cafferty's segment on CNN's The Situation Room with Wolf Blitzer on the day of her death, he asked the host: "Is Anna Nicole Smith still dead, Wolf?" It was also used now and then on NBC News Overnight in the early 1980s, and Keith Olbermann occasionally used it on Countdown. In 2013, it experienced a brief resurgence in a different context, when it began appearing on social media a few days after the death of Spanish filmmaker Jesús Franco.

The Wall Street Journal used the headline "Generalísimo Francisco Franco Is Still Dead – And His Statues Are Next" on its front page March 2, 2009. The newspaper used it once again on its front page in the headline "Generalísimo Francisco Franco Is Still Dead – But for some not dead enough" on August 21, 2015, when it reported about critics calling to enforce a 2007 anti-Franco law in Madrid and to rename streets and plazas, after the last election had ended the 24-year reign of conservatives in the city council.

Although SNL's use is the most widely known, it is predated by the "'John Garfield Still Dead' syndrome," which originated as a result of extensive coverage in the wake of actor John Garfield's death and funeral in 1952.

After a brief in memoriam during SNL's 40th Anniversary Special on February 15, 2015, Bill Murray ended the segment with the famous phrase which "just came in from Spain."

The phrase is listed in The Oxford Dictionary of Catchphrases.
