= Bestsellers (web series) =

- Genre: Comedy
- Created by: Susan Miller
- Directed by: Tina Cesa Ward
- Starring: Catherine Curtin; Mandy Bruno; Alice Barden; Dena Tyler; Natalie Kuhn
- Country of origin: United States
- Original language: English
- No. of seasons: 1
- No. of episodes: 8

Production
- Executive producers: Wilson Cleveland; Melissa Schneider
- Producer: Susan Miller
- Production location: New York
- Cinematography: Ava Berkofsky
- Camera setup: Single-camera
- Running time: 5–10 minutes

Original release
- Network: YouTube
- Release: January 31 – March 21, 2011

Bestsellers is an American limited comedy web television series created and written by Susan Miller and directed by Tina Cesa Ward. It stars Catherine Curtin, Mandy Bruno Bogue, Alice Barden, Dena Tyler and Natalie Kuhn as five professional women balancing life, work and book club. The series, presented by SFN Group, debuted on YouTube on January 31, 2011, and aired until March 21, 2011.

== Cast and characters ==
- Catherine Curtin as Abby, an accountant struggling with whether or not to blow the whistle on her boss who is embezzling money from the company.
- Mandy Bruno Bogue as Nina, a single mommy blogger consumed with current affairs.
- Alice Barden as Zoe, a smart, neurotic, creative powerhouse and entrepreneur looking for her next big idea.
- Dena Tyler as Jules, an independent contractor who prepares soldiers who return from duty for domestic situations through role playing. She also works with different companies training employees/execs for different scenarios.
- Natalie Kuhn as Taylor, a travel executive whose ambition is to walk across the U.S and recruits the group to go into training with her.

== Episodes ==
No.	Title	Directed by	Written by	Original release date
1	"Coffee!"	Tina Cesa Ward	Susan Miller	January 31, 2011
Meet Zoe (the tech entrepreneur), Jules (the HR consultant), Nina (the mommy blogger), Taylor (the travel consultant) and Abby (the accountant).
2	"A Stalker Among Us"	Tina Cesa Ward	Susan Miller	February 3, 2011
Nina (Mandy Bruno) fears somebody is "stalking" her blog.
3	"Look at Me"	Tina Cesa Ward	Susan Miller	February 11, 2010
Entrepreneur Zoe (Alice Barden) confides in Taylor (Natalie Kuhn) that she feels her age may be standing in the way of getting investors to fund her next big idea.
4	"The Crazy You Get"	Tina Cesa Ward	Susan Miller	February 21, 2011
Jules (Dena Tyler), Abby (Catherine Curtin) and Taylor (Natalie Kuhn) are in training. Nina remembers the moment she decided between life and career.
5	"The War Between the Ages"	Tina Cesa Ward	Susan Miller	February 28, 2011
The ladies stage a face lift intervention for Zoe.
6	"If You Blog It, They Will Come"	Tina Cesa Ward	Susan Miller	March 7, 2011
Taylor convinces mommy blogger Nina to step in front of the video camera.
7	"After Hours"	Tina Cesa Ward	Susan Miller	March 14, 2011
Abby suspects her employer may be fudging some financial statements and struggles with whether or not to blow the whistle.
8	"A Woman Walks Into the Room"	Tina Cesa Ward	Susan Miller	March 21, 2011
Zoe finally reveals her "big idea." Series finale.
