= Saturday Night Live 40th Anniversary Special =

2015 American television special

- Saturday Night Live episode
- Special's promo card
- Directed by: Don Roy King
- Narrated by: Darrell Hammond
- Original air date: February 15, 2015
- Running time: 211 minutes (with commercials)

"Saturday Night Live 40th Anniversary Special" (also billed as "SNL40") is a three-and-a-half-hour prime-time special that aired on February 15, 2015, on NBC, celebrating Saturday Night Live's 40th year on the air, having premiered on October 11, 1975, under the original title NBC's Saturday Night. The special was produced by Broadway Video and directed by then-series director Don Roy King. This special generated 23.1 million viewers, becoming NBC's most-watched prime-time, non-sports, entertainment telecast (excluding Super Bowl lead-outs) since the Friends series finale in 2004. It is the third such anniversary special to be broadcast, with celebratory episodes also held during the 15th and 25th seasons.

The special was preceded on NBC by an hour-long SNL 40th Red Carpet Live, hosted by Matt Lauer, Savannah Guthrie, Carson Daly and Al Roker, who interviewed past hosts, current and previous cast members, and musical legends who had previously performed on the show.

== Synopsis ==
The special followed the format of a typical Saturday Night Live episode, extended to 3½ hours instead of the usual 1½, and included a cold open, a monologue, sketches, a short film, commercial parodies, and musical performances. The sketches, most of which were revivals of sketches that appeared over the show's run, made reference to the show and its four decades on air, with the original cast members who appeared in those sketches reprising their roles along with numerous guest stars. A handful of commercial parodies, including "Colon Blow" and "Mom Jeans", reran as they originally appeared on the show. In order of appearance:

=== Sketches ===
| Sketch | Notes |
|---|---|
| Cold Open number | Jimmy Fallon and Justin Timberlake appeared in the cold open, performing a "History of Rap"-esque musical number referencing famous sketches from the show's history. Rachel Dratch and Molly Shannon appeared as Debbie Downer and Mary Katherine Gallagher, respectively. |
| Opening monologue | Steve Martin hosted with featured cameos from Tom Hanks, Alec Baldwin, Melissa McCarthy, Chris Rock, Peyton Manning, Miley Cyrus, Billy Crystal, Paul McCartney, and Paul Simon, with the latter two performing an abbreviated duet of "I've Just Seen a Face". |
| "Super Bass-O-Matic 2150" sketch | Dan Aykroyd and Laraine Newman acted, referencing a sketch originally done during the show's first season |
| "Celebrity Jeopardy!" sketch | Performers included Will Ferrell (as Alex Trebek), Darrell Hammond (as Sean Connery), Kate McKinnon (as Justin Bieber), Alec Baldwin (as Tony Bennett), Norm Macdonald (as Burt Reynolds), Taran Killam (as Christoph Waltz), Jim Carrey (as Matthew McConaughey), and Kenan Thompson (as Bill Cosby). Eddie Murphy was asked to play Cosby but turned it down due to the 2014 allegations against Cosby. |
| Audition montage | Pete Davidson and Leslie Jones introduced a montage featuring the auditions of current and former cast members, along with a few celebrities who never made the cast, including Jim Carrey, Stephen Colbert, Zach Galifianakis, and Kevin Hart. |
| New York City clip montage | Robert De Niro introduced vintage SNL clips dedicated to New York City. Alicia Keys performs "Empire State of Mind" during the montage. |
| Political humor clip montage | Jack Nicholson introduced vintage SNL clips dedicated to the political humor and Presidential election sketches. |
| "The Californians/Total Bastard Airlines" | Performers include Fred Armisen, Vanessa Bayer, Bradley Cooper, Bill Hader, Taran Killam, Laraine Newman (reprising her Sherry the Valley Girl character), David Spade, Cecily Strong, Taylor Swift, Kenan Thompson, Kerry Washington, Betty White, and Kristen Wiig. |
| Weekend Update | Jane Curtin, Tina Fey, and Amy Poehler served as anchors with appearances by Emma Stone (as Roseanne Roseannadanna), Edward Norton (as Stefon), Bill Hader (also as Stefon), Seth Meyers, Melissa McCarthy (as Matt Foley) and Bobby Moynihan (as the Land Shark). |
| A tribute to Chevy Chase | Former Weekend Update hosts Norm Macdonald, Seth Meyers, Kevin Nealon, and Colin Quinn introduced and gave tribute to the first Weekend Update host Chevy Chase who gave brief comments. Garrett Morris also appears during the tribute. |
| Comedic musical medley | Maya Rudolph (as Beyoncé) and Martin Short introduced a musical medley featuring appearances by Fred Armisen and Kristen Wiig (as Garth & Kat), Ana Gasteyer and Will Ferrell (as The Culps), Joe Piscopo (as Frank Sinatra), Dana Carvey (as Derek Stevens), Adam Sandler (as Opera Man), Kenan Thompson and Jason Sudeikis (as Diondre Cole and Vance from the "What Up with That" sketches, alongside Cecily Strong and Sasheer Zamata as Poppy and Pippa), Steve Martin (as King Tut), Bill Murray (as Nick The Lounge Singer), alongside Paul Shaffer. Dan Aykroyd and Jim Belushi ended the medley as The Blues Brothers singing "Everybody Needs Somebody to Love" with all the performers onstage. |
| A tribute to Eddie Murphy | Chris Rock introduced Murphy with a lengthy and loving tribute to him. The appearance by Murphy marked his first appearance on the show since departing as a cast member in 1984. Many at the time were surprised that Murphy chose not to give a comedic monologue or reprise any of his characters. His remarks were described as being "brief" and "awkward" according to The Hollywood Reporter. |
| Sports humor clip montage | Derek Jeter and Peyton Manning introduced vintage SNL clips dedicated to sports humor. |
| "ESPN Classics" sketch | Will Forte and Jason Sudeikis appeared reprising their roles as Pete Twinkle and Greg Stink |
| "Questions from the Audience" segment | Jerry Seinfeld hosted with cameos from Michael Douglas, John Goodman, James Franco, Larry David, Ellen Cleghorne, Dakota Johnson, Tim Meadows, Bob Odenkirk, and Sarah Palin (whom Seinfeld jokingly mistook for Tina Fey.) |
| A tribute to Tracy Morgan | Tina Fey and Alec Baldwin (jokingly introduced as Mr. and Mrs. Alec Baldwin) gave tribute to Tracy Morgan, who was unable to attend due to recently suffering injuries sustaining from his 2014 accidental traffic collision with a truck. |
| Pre-taped sketches clip montage | Louis C.K. made jokes before introducing the vintage SNL clips dedicated to pre-recorded sketches. |
| SNL Digital Short | Zach Galifianakis introduced the SNL Digital Short "That's When You Break" featuring Bill Hader, Chris Parnell, Andy Samberg, and Adam Sandler. |
| Wayne's World sketch | Mike Myers and Dana Carvey reprised their roles as Wayne Campbell and Garth Algar with a cameo appearance from Kanye West. |
| SNL goodnights | Steve Martin pulled Lorne Michaels up onstage as they began the famous SNL goodnight to end the night with the rest of the entertainers. |

=== Musical performances ===
The show included musical performances by:

| Presenter | Musicians | Notes |
|---|---|---|
| Keith Richards | Paul McCartney | "Maybe I'm Amazed" |
| Candice Bergen and Win Butler | Miley Cyrus | "50 Ways to Leave Your Lover" |
| Christopher Walken | Kanye West | Medley of "Jesus Walks", "Only One," and "Wolves" (the latter with Sia and Vic Mensa) |
| Jack White | Paul Simon | "Still Crazy After All These Years" |

=== In Memoriam ===
Bill Murray introduced an "In Memoriam" tribute to late SNL cast and crew members (which also included an obligatory mention of Francisco Franco).

The following were paid tribute to:

- Jan Hooks, cast member
- Elizabeth Karolyi, wardrobe
- Al Siegel, cue cards
- Don Pardo, announcer
- Bernie Brillstein, talent manager
- Al Camoin, camera operator
- Tom Davis, writer/performer
- Andy Kaufman, guest performer
- Danitra Vance, cast member
- Charles Rocket, cast member
- Tom Wolk, band
- Heino Ripp, technical director
- Dave Wilson, director
- Willie Day, prop master
- Phil Hartman, cast member
- Chris Farley, cast member
- Michael O'Donoghue, writer/performer
- Elliott Wald, writer
- Audrey Peart Dickman, coordinating producer
- Herb Sargent, head writer
- John Belushi, cast member
- Gilda Radner, cast member
- Jon Lovitz (not deceased), cast member—jokingly included in the segment as part of a running gag during the special that Lovitz, who was alive and present in the audience, was dead. Lovitz's exasperated reaction to being included in the "In Memoriam" is shown.

== Guest appearances ==
This special assembled together a large list of current and former cast members, hosts, and musical acts from throughout the show's forty seasons. Show creator and executive producer Lorne Michaels stated that every host and most musical guests were invited, plus any cast member or writer who had been on the show more than a year. Ultimately, over a hundred in all were then confirmed to appear.

In the opening sequence, 81 performers were credited. Unlike a regular episode, all performers were credited as repertory:

- Fred Armisen
- Dan Aykroyd
- Alec Baldwin
- Vanessa Bayer
- Jim Belushi
- Candice Bergen
- Win Butler
- Jim Carrey
- Dana Carvey
- Chevy Chase
- Louis C.K.
- Ellen Cleghorne
- Bradley Cooper
- Billy Crystal
- Jane Curtin
- Miley Cyrus
- Larry David
- Pete Davidson
- Robert De Niro
- Michael Douglas
- Rachel Dratch
- Jimmy Fallon
- Will Ferrell
- Tina Fey
- Will Forte
- James Franco
- Zach Galifianakis
- Ana Gasteyer
- John Goodman
- Bill Hader
- Darrell Hammond
- Tom Hanks
- Derek Jeter
- Dakota Johnson
- Leslie Jones
- Taran Killam
- Jon Lovitz
- Norm Macdonald
- Peyton Manning
- Steve Martin
- Melissa McCarthy
- Paul McCartney
- Kate McKinnon
- Tim Meadows
- Seth Meyers
- Garrett Morris
- Bobby Moynihan
- Eddie Murphy
- Bill Murray
- Mike Myers
- Kevin Nealon
- Laraine Newman
- Jack Nicholson
- Edward Norton
- Bob Odenkirk
- Sarah Palin
- Joe Piscopo
- Amy Poehler
- Colin Quinn
- Keith Richards
- Chris Rock
- Maya Rudolph
- Andy Samberg
- Adam Sandler
- Jerry Seinfeld
- Paul Shaffer
- Molly Shannon
- Martin Short
- Paul Simon
- David Spade
- Emma Stone
- Cecily Strong
- Jason Sudeikis
- Taylor Swift
- Kenan Thompson
- Justin Timberlake
- Kerry Washington
- Kanye West
- Betty White
- Jack White
- Kristen Wiig

== Audience members ==
Also in attendance included numerous actors, musicians, comedians, media figures, politicians, and celebrities such as:

- Arcade Fire
- Tom Arnold
- The B-52s
- Backstreet Boys
- Christine Baranski
- Lance Bass
- Beck Bennett
- Michael Bolton
- Jim Breuer
- A. Whitney Brown
- Steve Buscemi
- Aidy Bryant
- AJ Calloway
- Kate Capshaw
- 50 Cent
- Dave Chappelle
- Michael Che
- Glenn Close
- Sean Combs
- David Cone
- Elvis Costello
- Sheryl Crow
- Alan Cumming
- Carson Daly
- Charlie Day
- Rocsi Diaz
- Leonardo DiCaprio
- Christopher Dodd
- Jean Doumanian
- Robin Duke
- Nora Dunn
- Christine Ebersole
- Ari Emanuel
- Siobhan Fallon
- Paul Feig
- Steve Forbes
- Sen. Al Franken
- Rudy Giuliani
- Whoopi Goldberg
- Jeff Goldblum
- Cuba Gooding Jr.
- Gilbert Gottfried
- Elliott Gould
- Tom Green
- Robert Greenblatt
- Savannah Guthrie
- Steve Guttenberg
- Haim
- Jon Hamm
- Debbie Harry
- Kevin Hart
- Sean Hayes
- Grace Hightower
- Melanie Hutsell
- Victoria Jackson
- Colin Jost
- Jon Bon Jovi
- Kim Kardashian
- Chris Kattan
- Tim Kazurinsky
- Kings of Leon
- Robert Klein
- Kevin Kline
- Johnny Knoxville
- David Koechner
- Jane Krakowski
- Gary Kroeger
- Frank Langella
- Matt Lauer
- Lucy Liu
- Chris Lowell
- George Lucas
- Ludacris
- Natasha Lyonne
- Kyle MacLachlan
- Eli Manning
- Penny Marshall
- Elaine May
- MC Hammer
- Dylan McDermott
- John McEnroe
- Bennett Miller
- Finesse Mitchell
- Kyle Mooney
- Mumford & Sons
- Randy Newman
- Joanna Newsom
- Don Novello
- Bill O'Reilly
- Cheri Oteri
- Chris Parnell
- David Paterson
- Nasim Pedrad
- Jay Pharoah
- Ryan Phillippe
- Prince
- Brett Ratner
- Jeff Richards
- Brian L. Roberts
- Al Roker
- Paul Rudd
- Horatio Sanz
- Diane Sawyer
- Rob Schneider
- Jessica Seinfeld
- Al Sharpton
- Sia
- Gabourey Sidibe
- Sarah Silverman
- J. K. Simmons
- Christian Slater
- Robert Smigel
- G. E. Smith
- J. B. Smoove
- Trey Songz
- Steven Spielberg
- Julia Sweeney
- Alex Trebek
- Joe Torre
- Donald Trump
- Melania Trump
- Christopher Walken
- Sigourney Weaver
- David Wells
- Olivia Wilde
- Fred Willard
- Sasheer Zamata
- Catherine Zeta-Jones

== Production ==
Of those former hosts, musical guests, former cast members and writers invited, the people who sent back an RSVP were then considered to be written for. Dan Aykroyd was asked by Lorne Michaels about doing a "Bass-O-Matic" sketch, while Mike Myers and Dana Carvey requested to reprise Wayne's World. Michaels stated that since different generations of former cast members were coming, they wanted to do sketches featuring mashups between different casts.

Writer Jim Downey conceived the idea of Nick the Lounge Singer singing the theme to Jaws way back in the 1970s, but was never able to pull it off during Bill Murray's tenure on SNL. They were unsure if they could obtain the necessary copyright clearance to show footage of Jaws on a monitor in the background until they realized that, since NBC had already acquired the rights to Jaws with its purchase of Universal Pictures in 2002, they could just ask director Steven Spielberg, who was in attendance.

Eddie Murphy was originally asked to play Bill Cosby in the "Celebrity Jeopardy!" sketch, but declined.

Nora Dunn was asked to participate in the musical medley as Liz Sweeney, but refused because Jan Hooks (the other Sweeney Sister) had died.

NSYNC were scheduled to appear in this special but their appearance was cancelled at the last minute.

== Marketing and promotion ==
A 15-second spot premiered during the Super Bowl XLIX broadcast and – along with two other 15-second clips – was uploaded on to the official Saturday Night Live YouTube page. While the clips promoted appearances by Jon Hamm and Paul Rudd, neither of these occurred during the live show. Numerous articles, features and interviews were published in the weeks prior to the broadcast.

VH1 Classic aired a 19-day marathon of SNL-related programming that ended on the day of the special, featuring notable episodes in a reverse chronological order (alongside theme blocks focusing on specific cast members, and films featuring them), concluding with the original series premiere.

== Awards and nominations ==
| Year | Award | Category | Nominated work | Result | Ref. |
|---|---|---|---|---|---|
| 2015 | Primetime Emmy Awards | Outstanding Variety Special | Lorne Michaels, Ken Aymong, Lindsay Shookus, Erin Doyle and Rhys Thomas, Steve Higgins and Erik Kenward | Won | |
| 2015 | Primetime Emmy Awards | Outstanding Directing for a Variety Special | Don Roy King | Won | |
| 2015 | Primetime Emmy Awards | Outstanding Writing for a Variety Special | James Anderson, Fred Armisen, Tina Fey, Steve Higgins, Chris Kelly, Erik Kenward, Rob Klein, Seth Meyers, Lorne Michaels, John Mulaney, Paula Pell, Jeff Richmond, Andy Samberg, Akiva Schaffer, Tom Schiller, Sarah Schneider, Marc Shaiman, Michael Shoemaker, Robert Smigel, Emily Spivey, Kent Sublette, Jorma Taccone and Bryan Tucker | Nominated | |
| 2015 | Primetime Emmy Awards | Outstanding Technical Direction, Camerawork, Video Control for a Special | Steven Cimino, Paul Cangialosi, Carl Eckett, Eric A. Eisenstein, Rich Friedman, Chuck Goslin, John Pinto, Len Wechsler, Frank Grisanti, Susan Noll | Nominated | |
| 2015 | Primetime Emmy Awards | Outstanding Lighting Design for a Variety Special | Phil Hymes, Geoff Amoral, Richard "Rick" McGuinness | Nominated | |
| 2015 | Primetime Emmy Awards | Outstanding Makeup For a Multi-Camera Series or Special (Non-Prosthetic) | Louie Zakarian, Amy Tagliamonti, Jason Milani, Sarah Egan, Daniela Zivkovic, and Melanie Demitri | Won | |
| 2015 | Primetime Emmy Awards | Outstanding Sound Mixing For A Variety Series Or Special | Saturday Night Live 40th Anniversary Special | Won | |

== Ratings ==
The special drew 23.1 million viewers, becoming NBC's most-watched prime-time, non-sports, entertainment telecast (excluding Super Bowl lead-outs) since the Friends series finale in 2004. This was slightly higher than the 22.15 million that watched the 25th anniversary special in September 1999.
