= Saturday Night (2024 film) =

2024 film by Jason Reitman

- Theatrical release poster
- Directed by: Jason Reitman
- Written by: Gil Kenan; Jason Reitman
- Produced by: Jason Blumenfeld; Peter Rice; Jason Reitman; Gil Kenan
- Starring: Gabriel LaBelle; Rachel Sennott; Cory Michael Smith; Ella Hunt; Dylan O'Brien; Emily Fairn; Matt Wood; Lamorne Morris; Kim Matula; Finn Wolfhard; Nicholas Braun; Cooper Hoffman; Andrew Barth Feldman; Nicholas Podany; Kaia Gerber; Robert Wuhl; Tommy Dewey; Catherine Curtin; Jon Batiste; Willem Dafoe; Paul Rust; Tracy Letts; Matthew Rhys; J. K. Simmons; Brad Garrett; Josh Brener
- Cinematography: Eric Steelberg
- Edited by: Nathan Orloff; Shane Reid
- Music by: Jon Batiste
- Production companies: Columbia Pictures; Reitman/Kenan Productions
- Distributed by: Sony Pictures Releasing
- Release dates: August 31, 2024 (Telluride); September 27, 2024 (United States)
- Running time: 109 minutes
- Country: United States
- Language: English
- Budget: $25–30 million
- Box office: $10.1 million

Saturday Night is a 2024 American biographical comedy-drama film directed by Jason Reitman, about the night of the premiere of NBC's Saturday Night, later known as Saturday Night Live, on October 11, 1975. The film stars an ensemble cast portraying the various Saturday Night cast and crew, led by Gabriel LaBelle as the show's creator and producer, Lorne Michaels and consisting of Rachel Sennott, Cory Michael Smith, Ella Hunt, Dylan O'Brien, Emily Fairn, Matt Wood, Lamorne Morris, Kim Matula, Finn Wolfhard, Nicholas Braun, Cooper Hoffman, Andrew Barth Feldman, Nicholas Podany, Kaia Gerber, Robert Wuhl, Tommy Dewey, Catherine Curtin, Jon Batiste, Willem Dafoe, Paul Rust, Tracy Letts, Matthew Rhys, J. K. Simmons, Brad Garrett, and Josh Brener.

Saturday Night had its world premiere at the 51st Telluride Film Festival on August 31, 2024, and began a limited theatrical release in the United States on September 27, 2024, before its wide release by Sony Pictures Releasing on October 11, the 49th anniversary of the show's premiere. The film received positive reviews from critics, with LaBelle's performance being singled out for praise, earning him a nomination for Best Actor in a Motion Picture – Musical or Comedy at the 82nd Golden Globe Awards. The film was a box-office bomb, grossing $10 million against its $25–30 million budget.

== Plot ==
On October 11, 1975, novice producer Lorne Michaels arrives at NBC Studios in New York City to prepare for the airing of the first episode of NBC's Saturday Night. The chaotic evening is plagued with disruptive incidents, a cast that alternates between hostility and rebellion, and a generally dismissive crew. Michaels' boss Dick Ebersol warns him that NBC executive David Tebet has brought executives from across the country to view the broadcast. Despite Tebet giving encouraging words to Michaels, Ebersol makes it known that Tebet has little faith in the show and is ready to replay an episode of The Tonight Show Starring Johnny Carson to fill the slot if things do not go well.

Garrett Morris, who has experience in operatic theater, questions his relevance among a cast of comics; John Belushi feels alienated from everyone and causes fights; Jim Henson is upset over how his Muppets segment is being treated by the writers; the writers themselves, especially Michael O'Donoghue, clash with censor Joan Carbunkle and her demands; host George Carlin thinks that what he is being asked to do is stupid and embarrassing; and everyone is trying to figure out what kind of show it is.

Meanwhile, Chevy Chase confronts Milton Berle when he begins to hit on his girlfriend, Jacqueline; Berle humiliates Chase and tells him that he will amount to nothing. Michaels receives a call from Johnny Carson himself, who is derisive and demeaning. Despite Michaels warning him not to, Ebersol attempts to sell the idea of performing a sketch with a Polaroid camera for product placement purposes. Belushi is offended and leaves the set with the intention of quitting.

As everyone looks for Belushi, assistant Neil Levy is given a joint by Paul Shaffer and has a panic attack, locking himself in a closet. He is eventually enticed out by the cast. Feeling hopeless, Michaels heads to a local bar where he meets comedy writer Alan Zweibel and hires him on the spot to become a writer on the show. Michaels and Gilda Radner find Belushi ice skating on the rink in front of 30 Rockefeller Plaza and convince him to return to the show and sign his contract. Michaels is further motivated to continue with the show after having a brief chat with Henson.

Tebet arrives, demanding that the show be shut down unless Michaels shows him exactly what it entails. Andy Kaufman performs his Mighty Mouse skit, which makes everyone laugh. Michaels then asks Chase to take over Weekend Update which he had planned to host himself. Chase does an impromptu version of Weekend Update using Zweibel's newly written material, which is successful. The audience arrives and fills the venue as cast and crew finish the sets and get into place. Tebet allows the live show to proceed to air. O'Donoghue and Belushi perform the "Wolverines" sketch, which is well received by the audience. Chase enters the scene and announces "Live from New York, it's Saturday Night!".

== Cast ==
- Gabriel LaBelle as Lorne Michaels
- Rachel Sennott as Rosie Shuster
- Cory Michael Smith as Chevy Chase
- Ella Hunt as Gilda Radner
- Dylan O'Brien as Dan Aykroyd
- Emily Fairn as Laraine Newman
- Matt Wood as John Belushi
- Lamorne Morris as Garrett Morris
- Kim Matula as Jane Curtin
- Finn Wolfhard as an NBC page
- Nicholas Braun in a dual role as:
  - Andy Kaufman
  - Jim Henson
- Ellen Boscov as Mrs. Kaufman
- Cooper Hoffman as Dick Ebersol
- Andrew Barth Feldman as Neil Levy
- Leander Suleiman as Anne Beatts
- Taylor Gray as Al Franken
- Mcabe Gregg as Tom Davis
- Abraham Hsu as Leo Yoshimura
- Corinne Britti as Valri Bromfield
- Nicholas Podany as Billy Crystal
- Rowan Joseph as Jim Fox
- Kirsty Woodward as Audrey Peart Dickman
- Kaia Gerber as Jacqueline Carlin
- Robert Wuhl as Dave Wilson
- Drew Scheid as Bob Pook
- Tommy Dewey as Michael O'Donoghue
- Catherine Curtin as Joan Carbunkle
- Jon Batiste as Billy Preston
- Brian Welch as Don Pardo
- Jef Holbrook as editor
- Willem Dafoe as David Tebet
- Paul Rust as Paul Shaffer
- Tracy Letts as Herb Sargent
- Matthew Rhys as George Carlin
- Naomi McPherson as Janis Ian
- J. K. Simmons as Milton Berle
- Presley Coley as Barbara Gallagher
- Parker Wierling as Tom Schiller
- Jeff Witzke as the voice of Johnny Carson
- Billy Bryk as Carl
- Ted Williams as Moose
- Brad Garrett as Borscht Belt comedian
- Josh Brener as Alan Zweibel
- David Michael Brown as Bernie Brillstein (uncredited)

== Production ==
=== Development ===
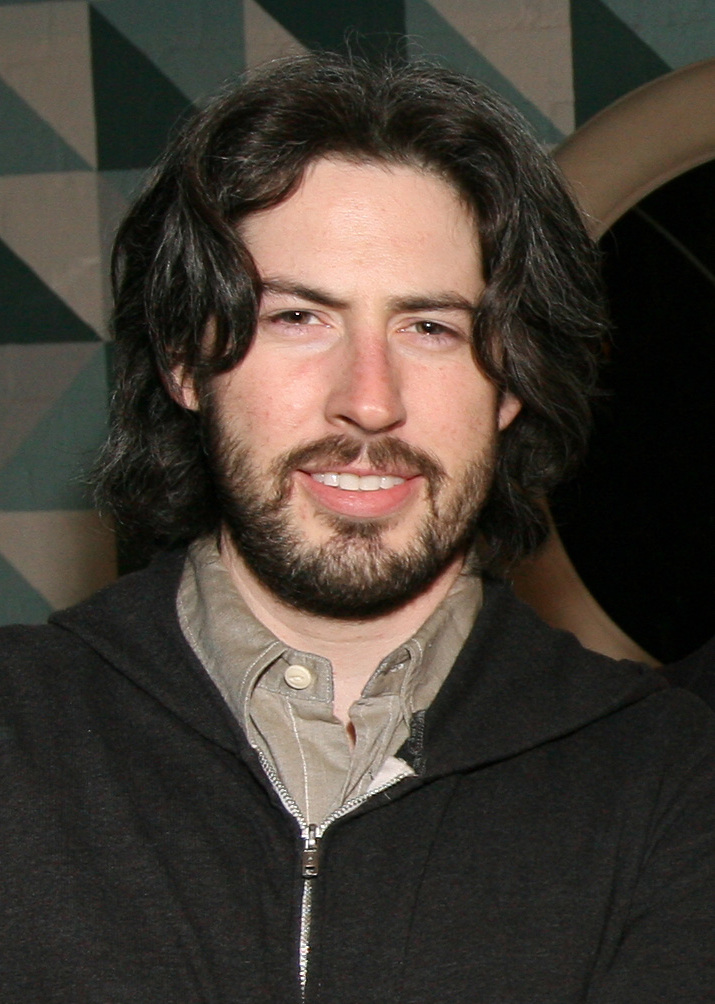
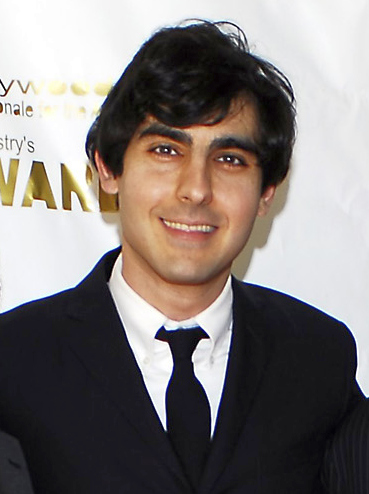
Director Jason Reitman (left) and writer Gil Kenan co-wrote and co-produced the film together.

It was announced in May 2023 that Jason Reitman would be directing, co-writing, and producing a film about the creation of the series Saturday Night Live for Sony Pictures. He, alongside his Ghostbusters: Afterlife (2021) and Ghostbusters: Frozen Empire (2024) collaborator Gil Kenan, conducted interviews with the living cast and crew of the premiere season in order to better develop the screenplay. According to Reitman, he came up with the idea for the film years earlier, but the "response was always the same: 'That's a great idea. But how the hell are you going to cast it?'"

=== Casting ===
In January 2024, Gabriel LaBelle was cast to portray Lorne Michaels, in his second major leading role following his performance as Sammy Fabelman in Steven Spielberg's The Fabelmans (2022), with Cooper Hoffman, Rachel Sennott, Ella Hunt, Emily Fairn, Kim Matula, Lamorne Morris, Dylan O'Brien, Cory Michael Smith, and Matt Wood cast as Dick Ebersol, Rosie Shuster, Gilda Radner, Laraine Newman, Jane Curtin, Garrett Morris, Dan Aykroyd, Chevy Chase, and John Belushi respectively. Nicholas Braun, Tommy Dewey, and Nicholas Podany were added in March to portray Jim Henson, Michael O'Donoghue, and Billy Crystal respectively. Additionally, Braun ended up cast to play Andy Kaufman as well. That role was originally supposed to be portrayed by Benny Safdie, but he had to drop out due to scheduling conflicts. Andrew Barth Feldman, Kaia Gerber, Finn Wolfhard, J. K. Simmons, Billy Bryk, Joe Chrest, Taylor Gray, Mcabe Gregg, and Willem Dafoe joined the cast later that month. Jon Batiste, who was hired to compose the score for the film, also appeared as Billy Preston. In April, Naomi McPherson of the band Muna was cast to portray Janis Ian. In June, it was reported that Leander Suleiman had been cast as writer Anne Beatts.

=== Filming ===
Principal photography began in March 2024 in Atlanta and Fayetteville, Georgia, as locations, under the working title Wolverines, a reference to the very first sketch ever performed on the series. Scenes were shot outside of Rockefeller Plaza on the weekend of March 9–10. Filming had concluded by May.

== Release ==
On July 30, it was announced the title was changed from the working title of SNL 1975 to Saturday Night, which was the original title of the show during its first season, since there was already a competing show at the time on ABC called Saturday Night Live with Howard Cosell. It was also given the release date of October 11, 2024, 49 years to the day that SNL premiered on NBC.

The film premiered at the 51st Telluride Film Festival and was selected to screen at the 2024 Toronto International Film Festival.

Shortly after its Telluride premiere, Sony Pictures decided to make some changes to the film's release schedule, pivoting to a limited theatrical release starting in Los Angeles, New York City, and Toronto on September 27, 2024, expanding to more cities on October 4, and then a nationwide release on October 11.

== Reception ==
=== Box office ===
In the United States, the film made $270,487 from five theaters in its opening weekend; its per-screen average of $54,097 was the second-best limited opening of the year, behind Kinds of Kindness. In its second weekend, it made $270,955 from 21 theaters. In its third weekend, the film expanded to 2,304 theaters and made $3.4 million, finishing in seventh. Anthony D'Alessandro of Deadline Hollywood argued the film had failed to find an audience despite positive reviews, similar to Sony's Dumb Money (which made $3.3 million when it expanded wide in 2023). The following weekend the film made $1.8 million (a drop of 47%). It ended its theatrical run on Thanksgiving. Variety reasoned that the film found "little box office traction" because "Sony only gave it a minuscule marketing budget."

=== Critical response ===
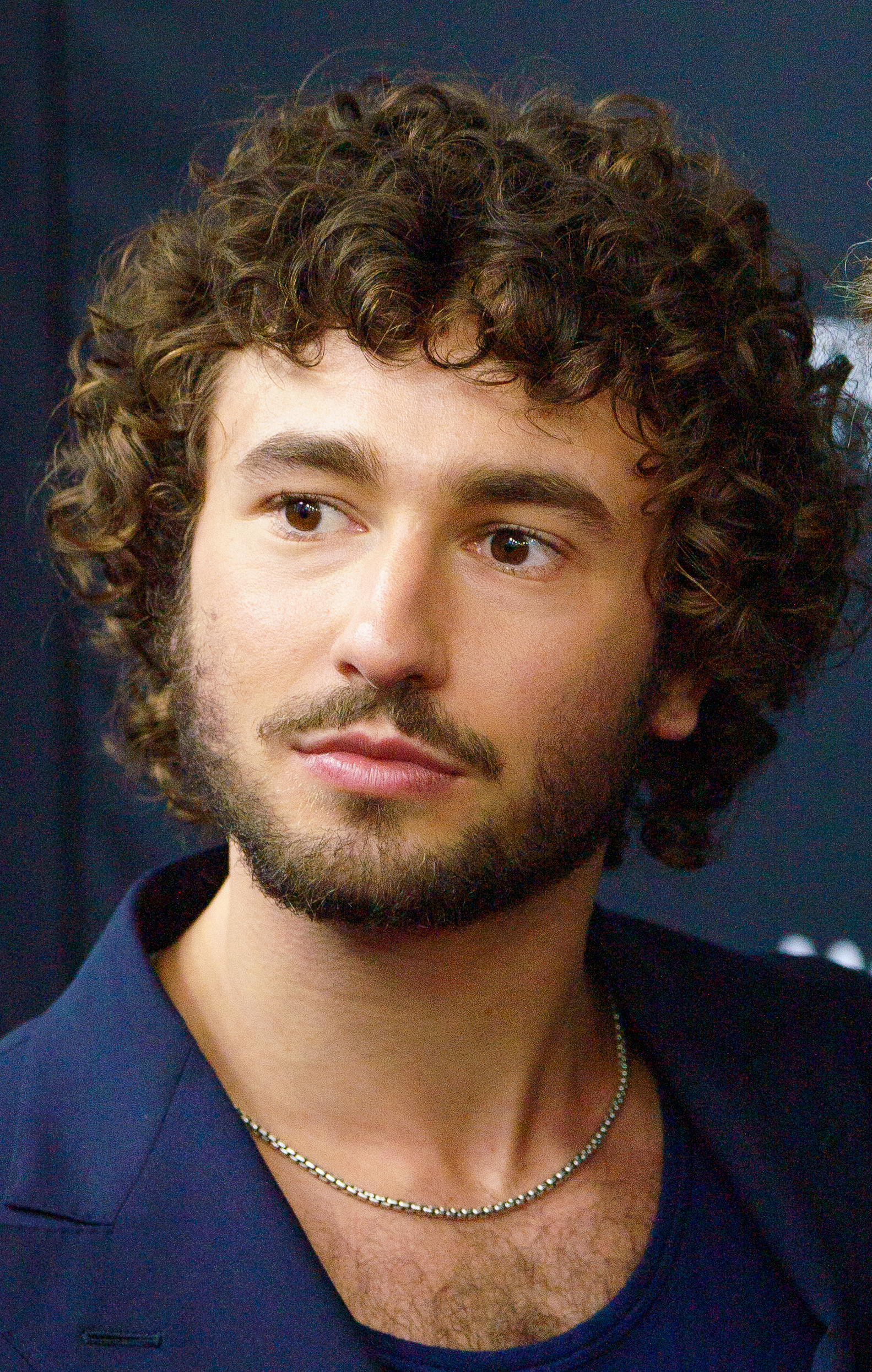
Gabriel LaBelle's performance as Lorne Michaels received acclaim.

On the review aggregator website Rotten Tomatoes, 77% of 256 critics' reviews are positive. The website's consensus reads: "Jazzed up by an excellent ensemble that captures the essence if not exact likeness of SNL's original cast and crew, Saturday Night is a frenetic and nostalgic celebration of one of showbiz's most auspicious debuts." Metacritic, which uses a weighted average, assigned the film a score of 60 out of 100, based on 46 critics, indicating "mixed or average" reviews. Audiences polled by CinemaScore gave the film an average grade of "B+" on an A+ to F scale, while those surveyed by PostTrak gave it an 82% overall positive score, with 63% saying they would definitely recommend it.

Peter Debruge of Variety gave the film a positive review, stating that director Reitman "finds the right ensemble to capture the lunacy from which SNL was born" and calling the film "a rowdy, delectably profane backstage homage." Gabriel LaBelle was singled out for praise by several outlets for his portrayal of a young Lorne Michaels, earning plaudits from Maureen Lee Lenker from Entertainment Weekly, for granting "Michaels a clarity of purpose, an unwavering conviction, and a harried sense that he's barely holding things together". Gregory Ellwood from The Playlist lauded several cast members, including LaBelle for "masterfully carrying the film" and especially Dylan O'Brien for being "simply transformative" as Dan Aykroyd in "an eye-opening turn". Benjamin Lee of The Guardian gave the film one out of five stars, calling the film an "unfunny misfire" and a "dull and self-indulgent mess". David Ehrlich from IndieWire stated that the film "has a lot of business in lieu of a story, and there's so much going on that it quickly starts to feel like nothing".

According to Reitman, on a podcast hosted by Dana Carvey and David Spade, original cast member Chevy Chase told the director "you should be embarrassed" after watching the film, with Carvey commenting, "[Chase] knows that’s funny, like that’s the roughest thing you could say to a director in the moment, or right up there." Original cast member Dan Aykroyd called it a "stand-alone masterpiece". Filmmakers Tim Fehlbaum, Hannah Fidell, and Michael Gracey, as well as actor Seth Rogen, praised the film and cited it as among their favorites of 2024.

=== Accolades ===
Award	Date of ceremony	Category	Recipient(s)	Result	Ref.
Middleburg Film Festival	October 20, 2024	Variety Collaborators Award	Eric Steelberg and Jason Reitman	Won	
Denver Film Festival	November 1, 2024	5280 Award	Gabriel LaBelle, Cory Michael Smith, Jason Reitman, Gil Kenan and Eric Steelberg	Won	
Virginia Film Festival	November 3, 2024	Virtuoso Award	Lamorne Morris	Won	
Hollywood Music in Media Awards	November 20, 2024	Best Original Score – Independent Film	Jon Batiste	Nominated	
Astra Film and Creative Arts Awards	December 8, 2024	Best Comedy or Musical	Saturday Night	Nominated	
Astra Film and Creative Arts Awards	December 8, 2024	Best Cast Ensemble	Saturday Night	Won	
Astra Film and Creative Arts Awards	December 8, 2024	Best Original Screenplay	Gil Kenan and Jason Reitman	Nominated	
Astra Film and Creative Arts Awards	December 8, 2024	Best Casting	John Papsidera	Nominated	
Astra Film and Creative Arts Awards	December 8, 2024	Best Editing	Nathan Orloff and Shane Reid	Nominated	
SFFILM Awards	December 9, 2024	Nion McEvoy & Leslie Berriman Award for Storytelling	Jason Reitman	Honored	
St. Louis Film Critics Association	December 15, 2024	Best Comedy Film	Saturday Night	Nominated	
St. Louis Film Critics Association	December 15, 2024	Best Ensemble	Saturday Night	Runner-up	
St. Louis Film Critics Association	December 15, 2024	Original Screenplay	Jason Reitman and Gil Kenan	Won	
St. Louis Film Critics Association	December 15, 2024	Best Editing	Nathan Orloff and Shane Reid	Nominated	
Florida Film Critics Circle	December 20, 2024	Best Ensemble	Saturday Night	Nominated	
Critics' Choice Movie Awards	January 12, 2025	Best Acting Ensemble	Saturday Night	Nominated	
Critics' Choice Movie Awards	January 12, 2025	Best Comedy	Saturday Night	Nominated	
Golden Globe Awards	January 5, 2025	Best Actor in a Motion Picture – Musical or Comedy	Gabriel LaBelle	Nominated	
Costume Designers Guild Awards	February 6, 2025	Excellence in Period Film	Danny Glicker	Nominated	
Black Reel Awards	February 10, 2025	Outstanding Breakthrough Performance	Lamorne Morris	Nominated	
Black Reel Awards	February 10, 2025	Outstanding Score	Jon Batiste	Nominated	
Artios Awards	February 12, 2025	Outstanding Achievement in Casting – Big Budget Feature (Comedy)	John Papsidera	Nominated	
Alliance of Women Film Journalists	TBA	Best Ensemble Cast and Casting Director	Saturday Night	Nominated	
Golden Reel Awards	February 23, 2025	Outstanding Achievement in Sound Editing – Feature Dialogue / ADR	David Butler, Will Files, Lee Gilmore, Helen Lutrell, Emma Present	Won	
