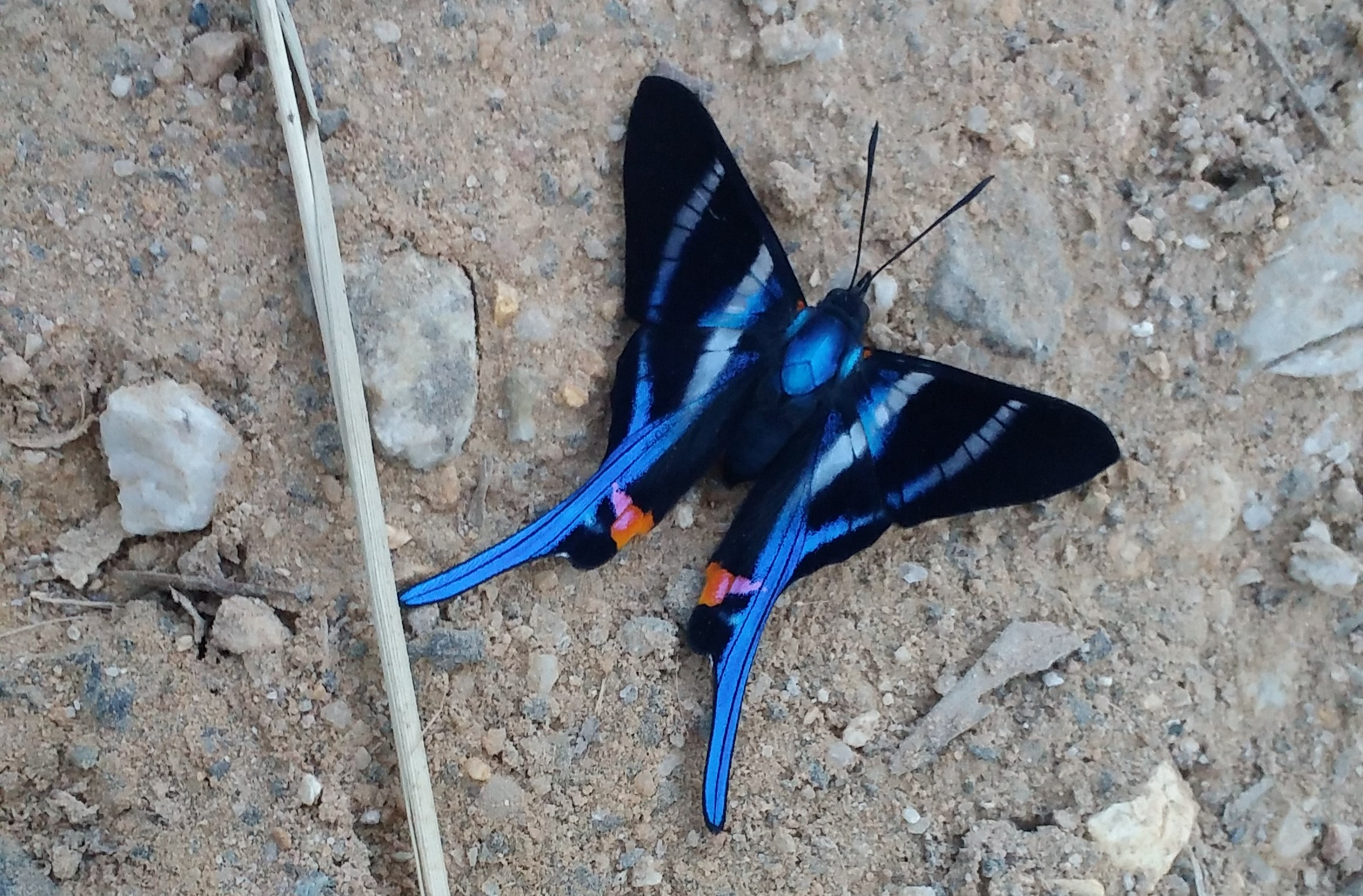

Scientific classification
- Kingdom: Animalia
- Phylum: Arthropoda
- Class: Insecta
- Order: Lepidoptera
- Family: Riodinidae
- Genus: Rhetus
- Species: R. arcius

Binomial name
- Rhetus arcius (Linnaeus, 1763)

Synonyms
- Papilio arcius Linnaeus, 1763; Papilio butes Linnaeus, 1767

= Rhetus arcius =

Species of butterfly

Rhetus arcius, the long-tailed metalmark, s a species of Neotropical butterfly, first described in Carl Linnaeus' 1763 Centuria Insectorum.
