= Beauty Mark =

- Beauty Mark release poster
- Directed by: Harris Doran
- Screenplay by: Harris Doran
- Produced by: Bridget Berger; Penny Edmiston; Harris Doran; Corey Moosa; Kiley Lane Parker
- Starring: Auden Thornton; Catherine Curtin; Laura Bell Bundy; Jeff Kober; Madison Iseman; Deirdre Lovejoy
- Cinematography: Karina Silva
- Edited by: Harris Doran; Saira Haider
- Music by: Ben Sollee
- Production companies: Madison Square Films; The Group Entertainment in association with Hideout Pictures
- Distributed by: The Orchard
- Release dates: June 16, 2017 (Los Angeles Film Festival); May 22, 2018 (United States)
- Running time: 87 minutes
- Country: United States
- Language: English

Beauty Mark is a 2017 American drama film written and directed by Harris Doran. Inspired by true events, the film follows a poverty-stricken young mother who has to get money from a man from her abusive past in order to save her family. The film explores the interconnected themes of abuse, cycles of abuse, systemic poverty, addiction, and race.

The film won multiple awards including the Jury Prize for "Breakout Performance" for its star Auden Thornton at the Los Angeles Film Festival premiere, the Ultra Indie Film Award at Woodstock Film Festival for its director Harris Doran, and the Audience Award for Best Feature Film at the Austin Film Festival.

== Plot ==
Set in the Portland area of downtown Louisville, Kentucky, the film follows Angie Simms (Auden Thornton), a poverty-stricken young mother taking care of her three-year-old son Trey (Jameson Fowler) and her alcoholic mother (Catherine Curtin). She works at a convenience store which Lorraine (Laura Bell Bundy), a dancer at a local club, frequents. Lorraine insists the men "ain't using me, I'm using them." Angie finds out the house her family is living in is condemned and they must move immediately. Out of options, she decides to try to sue Bruce (Jeff Kober) a man who abused her as a child, only to find out that at twenty-four, she is one year past the statute of limitations under Kentucky law.

She seeks help from Zachariah (Radney Foster) the father of a childhood friend, Pastor Hodges (Deirdre Lovejoy), Kaylee (Paten Hughes) a childhood acquaintance, and Pam (Madison Iseman) a girl a few years younger than she.

== Cast ==
- Auden Thornton as Angie Simms
- Catherine Curtin as Ruth Ann Simms
- Laura Bell Bundy as Lorraine
- Jeff Kober as Bruce
- Madison Iseman as Pam
- Deirdre Lovejoy as Pastor Hodges
- Jameson Fowler as Trey
- Tim Morton as Wyatt
- Paten Hughes as Kaylee
- Ben Curtis as Billy
- Wynn Reichert as Ray
- Radney Foster as Zachariah
- Mike Schroerlucke as Inspector

== Release ==
The film premiered at the Los Angeles Film Festival and was shown at Woodstock Film Festival, Austin Film Festival, St. Louis International Film Festival, Bahamas International Film Festival, San Luis Obispo International Film Festival, SENE Film, Music & Art Festival. The film was acquired by The Orchard and released On Digital and On Demand May 22, 2018.

== Critical reception ==
Director Harris Doran was shortlisted for the Independent Spirit Awards Someone To Watch Award for his work on Beauty Mark. A day after its digital release, the film hit #14 on the iTunes Top Independent Film chart.

Ashley Judd said of the film, "Powerful film. Survivors must no longer be silent."

== Awards and nominations ==
Year	Ceremony	Category	Recipients	Result
2017	Los Angeles Film Festival	Best Film	Beauty Mark	Nominated
2017	Los Angeles Film Festival	Special Jury Prize: Breakout Performance	Auden Thornton	Won
2017	Woodstock Film Festival	Best Ultra Indie Award	Harris Doran	Won
2017	Twin Cities Film Festival	Best Film	Beauty Mark	Nominated
2017	Twin Cities Film Festival	Best Actress	Auden Thornton	Nominated
2017	Austin Film Festival	Audience Award: Narrative Feature	Beauty Mark	Won
2017	St. Louis International Film Festival	Emerging Director	Harris Doran	Nominated
2017	Bahamas International Film Festival	Best Film - New Visions Award	Beauty Mark	Nominated
2018	Annapolis Film Festival	Best Narrative Feature	Beauty Mark	Nominated
2018	San Luis Obispo International Film Festival	Best Feature Film	Beauty Mark	Won
2018	SENE Film, Music and Art Festival	Best Feature Film	Beauty Mark	Won
2018	SENE Film, Music and Art Festival	Best Actress	Auden Thornton	Won
