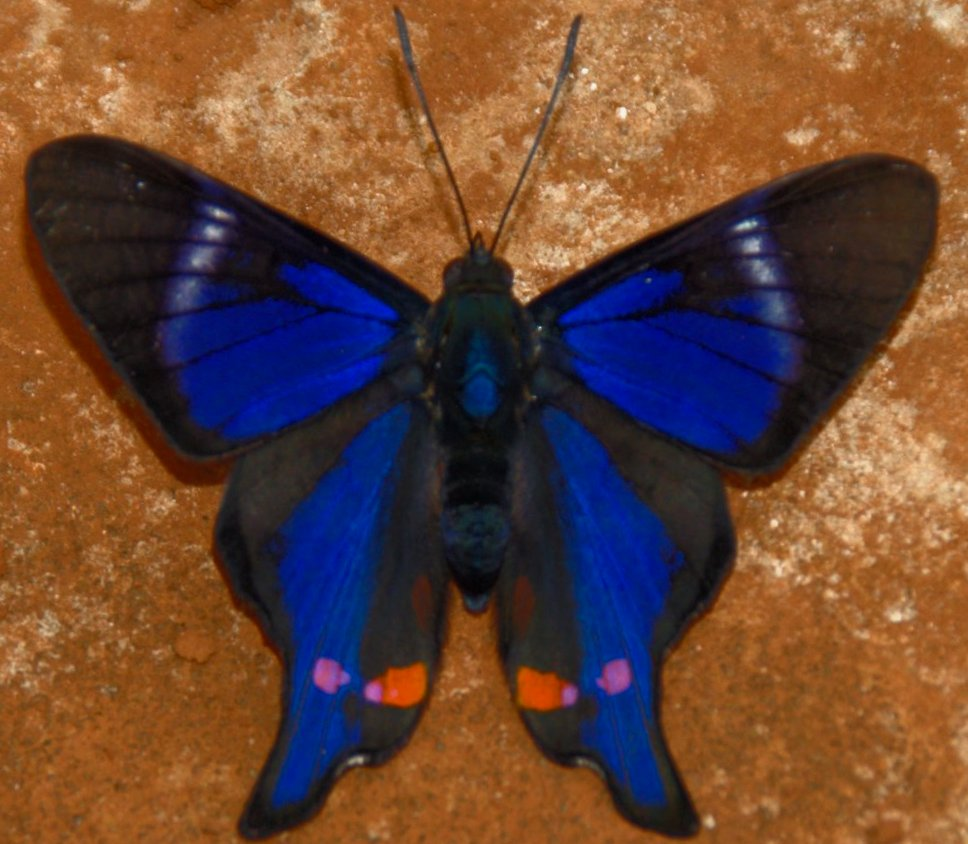

Scientific classification
- Kingdom: Animalia
- Phylum: Arthropoda
- Class: Insecta
- Order: Lepidoptera
- Family: Riodinidae
- Genus: Rhetus
- Species: R. periander

Binomial name
- Rhetus periander (Cramer, [1777])

Synonyms
- Papilio periander; Diorina laonome; Diorhina periander

= Rhetus periander =

Species of butterfly

Rhetus periander, the Periander metalmark or variable beautymark, is a butterfly of the family Riodinidae. It is found in most of Central and South America, ranging from Mexico to Brazil and Argentina.

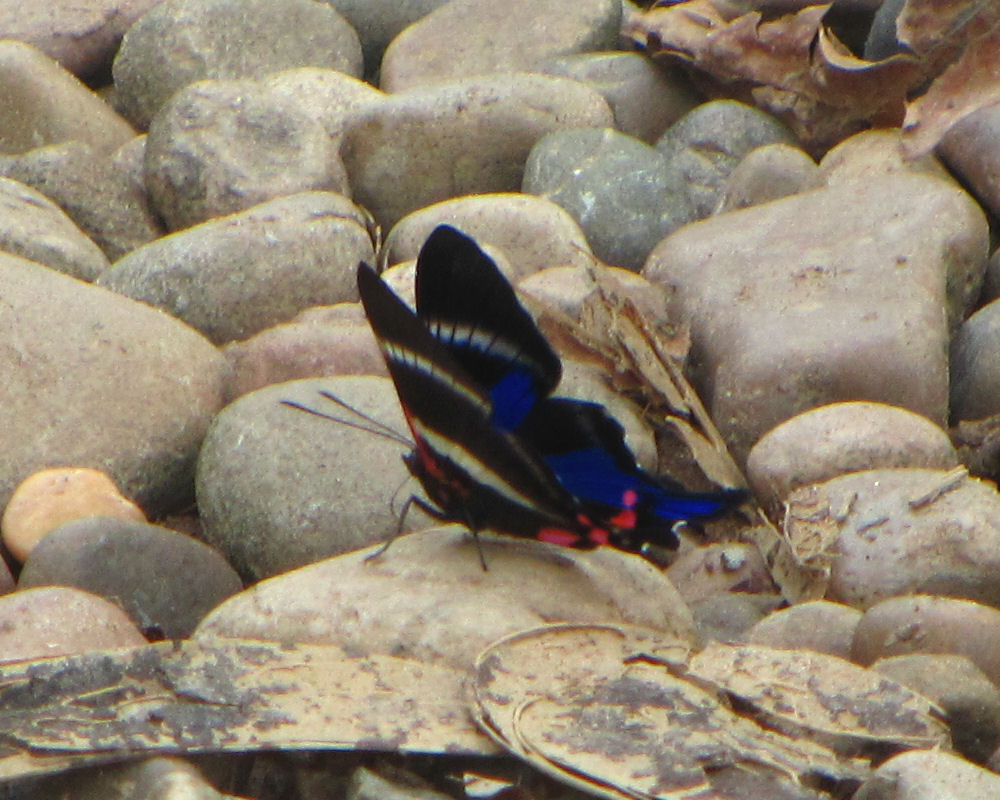
Male, Tambopata Park, Peru

== Subspecies ==
These subspecies are recognised:

- R. p. arthuriana (Goiás, Brazil)
- R. p. eleusinus (Brazil: São Paulo, Santa Catarina, and Rio de Janeiro)
- R. p. periander (Suriname)
- R. p. laonome (Colombia)
- R. p. naevianus (Honduras to Costa Rica)

== Reproduction ==
Females of Rhetus periander search for the host plants on which to lay eggs on the hottest hours of the day. Typically, one or two eggs are laid per plant. The lifecycle from egg to full adult is a full 50 days.
