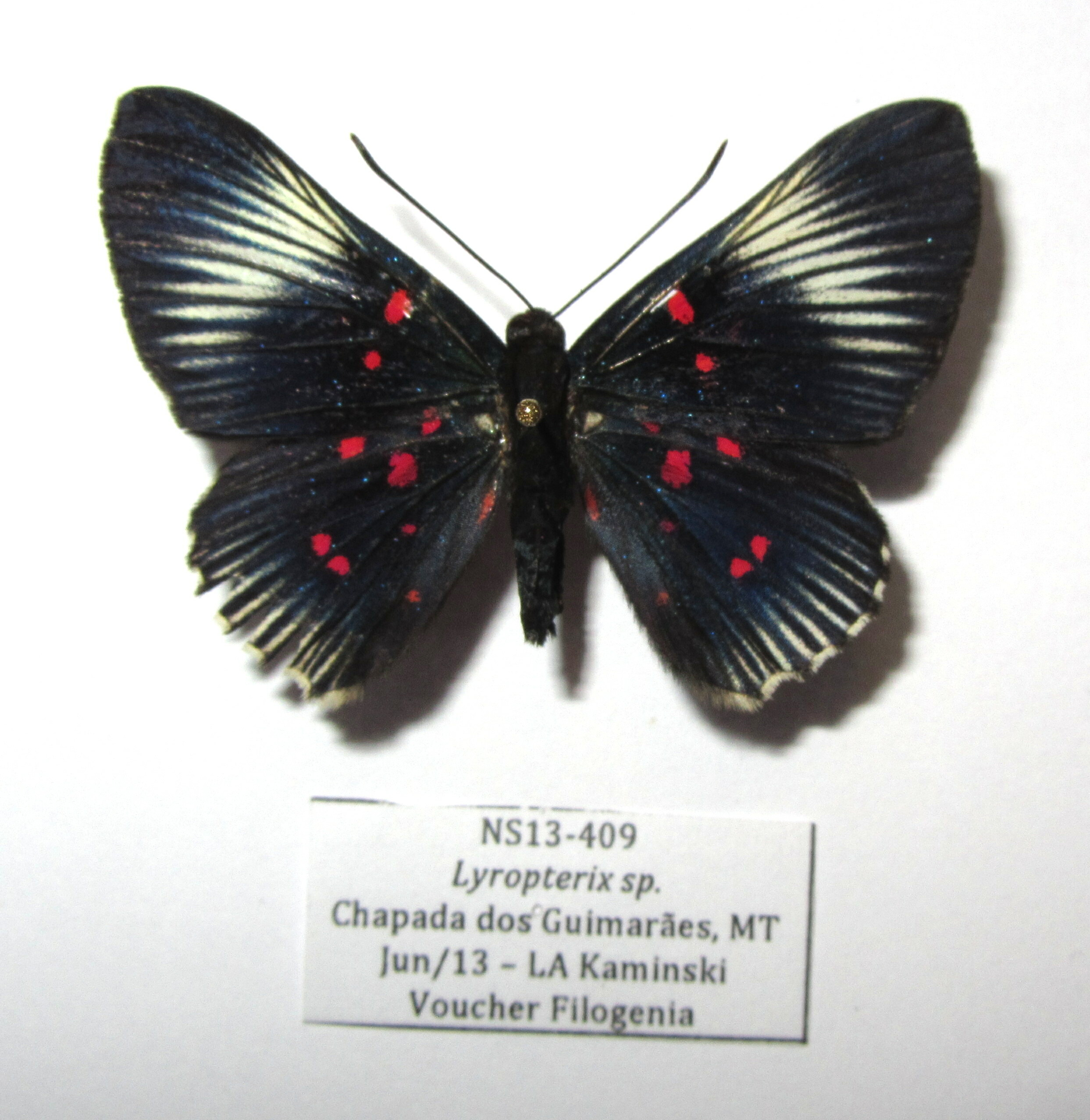
- Brazilian Lyropteryx therpsichore
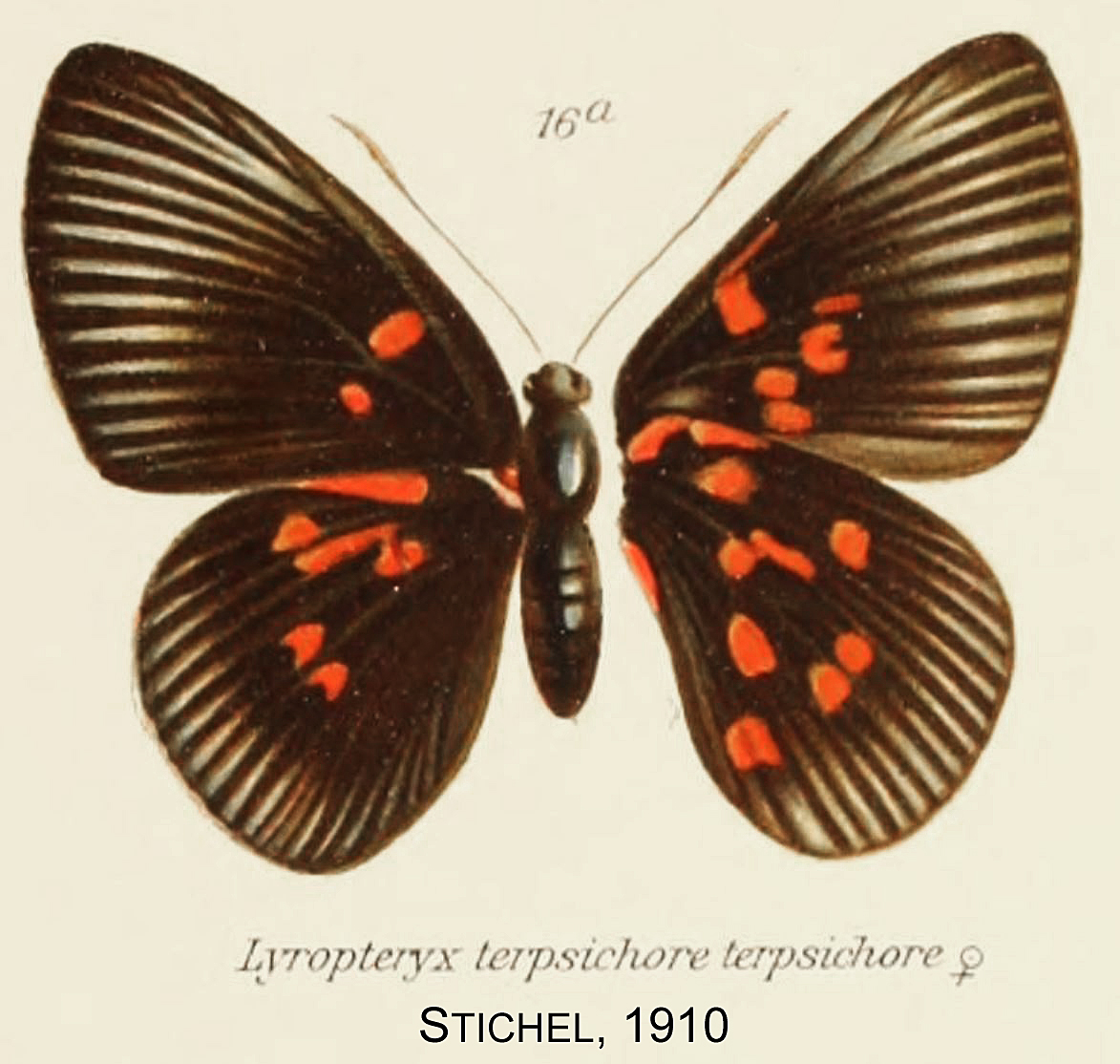
- Drawing from 1910

Scientific classification
- Domain: Eukaryota
- Kingdom: Animalia
- Phylum: Arthropoda
- Class: Insecta
- Order: Lepidoptera
- Family: Riodinidae
- Genus: Lyropteryx
- Species: L. terpsichore

Binomial name
- Lyropteryx terpsichore Westwood, 1851

Subspecies
- Lyropteryx terpsichore terpsichore; Lyropteryx terpsichore zygaena

Synonyms
- Lyropteryx terpsichore terpsichore Westwood; Stichel, 1910: 94; Lamas, 2004: 148.

= Lyropteryx terpsichore =

Species of butterfly

Lyropteryx terpsichore is a species of butterfly in the butterfly family Riodinidae, subfamily Riodininae and the Lyropteryx genus.

Lyropteryx terpsichore was described by John O. Westwood in 1851.

It is endemic to Paraguay and Brazil.
