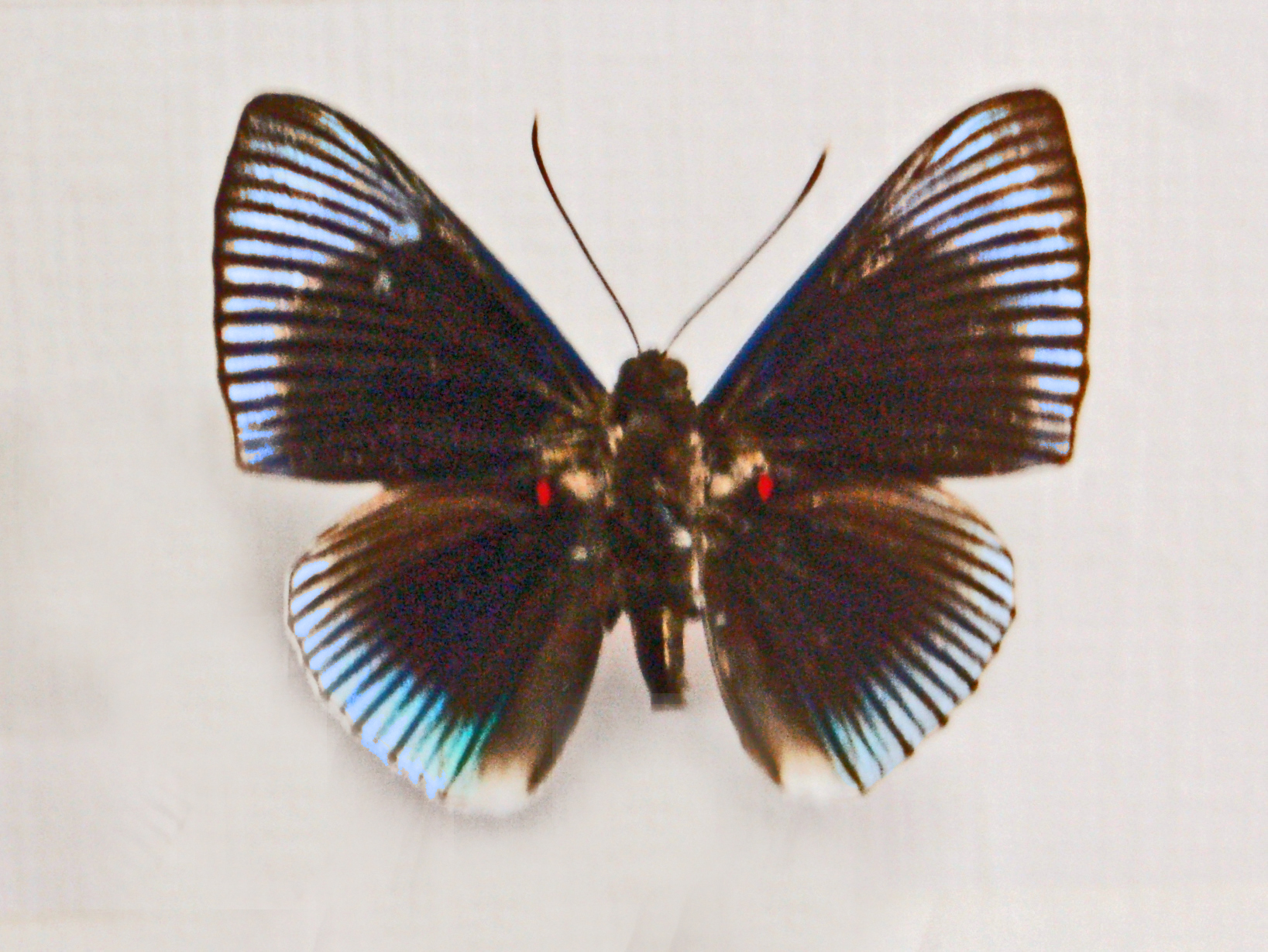
- Dorsal view, National Museum, Prague
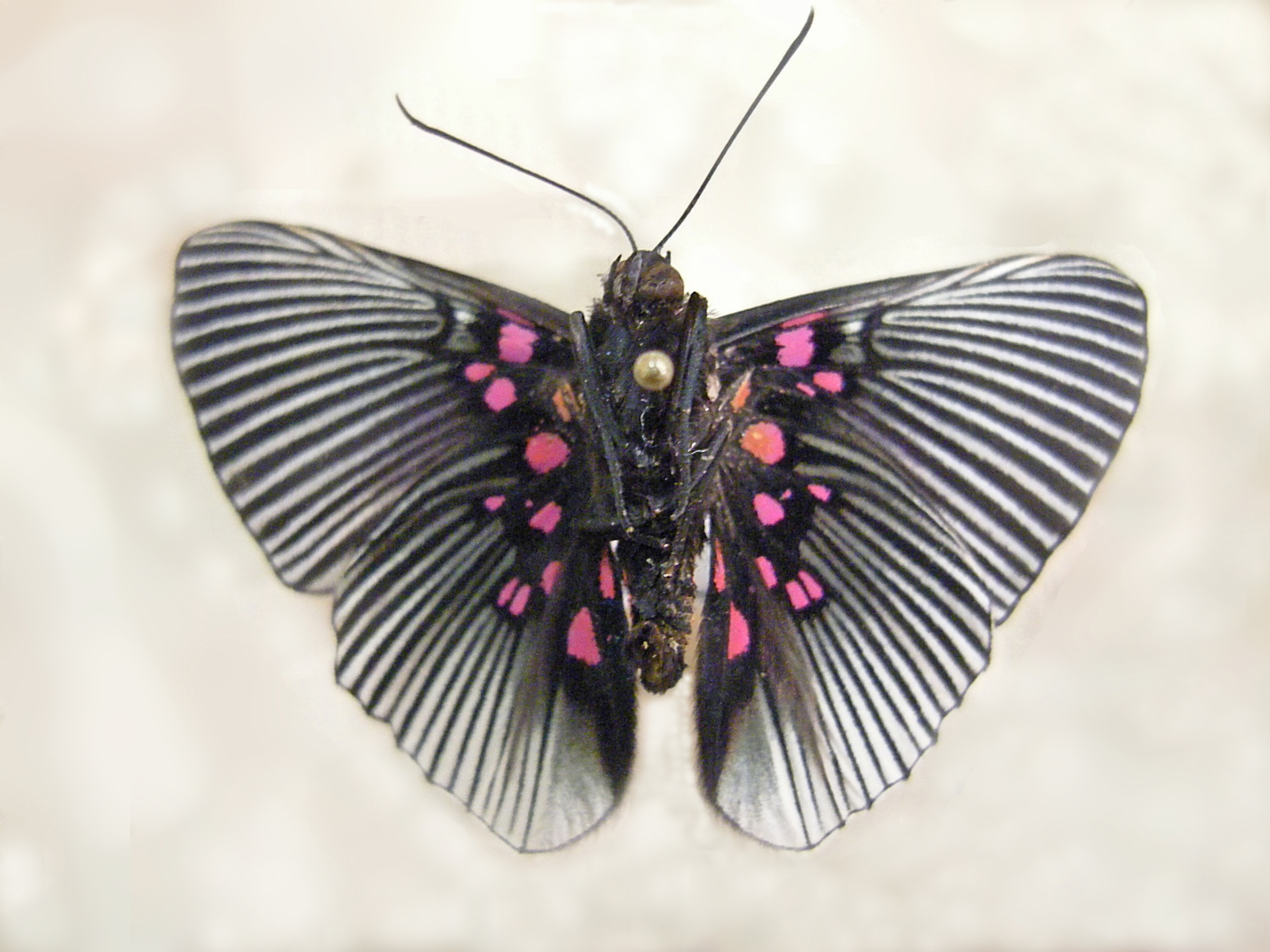
- Underside

Scientific classification
- Domain: Eukaryota
- Kingdom: Animalia
- Phylum: Arthropoda
- Class: Insecta
- Order: Lepidoptera
- Family: Riodinidae
- Genus: Lyropteryx
- Species: L. apollonia

Binomial name
- Lyropteryx apollonia Westwood, 1851

Synonyms
- Lyropteryx apollonia musageta Bryk, 1953

= Lyropteryx apollonia =

Species of butterfly

Lyropteryx apollonia, the Apollo metalmark, pink-dotted metalmark or blue-rayed metalmark, is a butterfly of the family Riodinidae, subfamily Riodininae, tribe Riodinini. The species was first described by John O. Westwood in 1851.

== Description ==
The wingspan of Lyropteryx apollonia is about 35–43 millimetres (1.4–1.7 in). Upper surface of the wings is black, with numerous longitudinal streaks of metallic blue-green colours on the outer half. The undersides are black, with the basal half spotted with purple-pink and the outer half with black and white stripes. Forewings are large, subtriangular, while the hindwings are relatively small.

== Distribution ==
This rare species is widespread in the tropical areas of the South America, particularly in Ecuador, Brazil (Acre, Amazonas, Mato Grosso), Bolivia, Peru and Colombia.

== Habitat ==
Lyropteryx apollonia can be found in tropical rainforests, at an elevation of about 200–600 metres (660–1,970 ft)

== Subspecies ==
- Lyropteryx apollonia apollonia Stichel, 1910 (Brazil: Amazonas, Bolivia, Peru)
- Lyropteryx apollonia diana Stichel, 1910 (Colombia)
- Lyropteryx apollonia sparsa Stichel, 1924 (Brazil: Mato Grosso)
