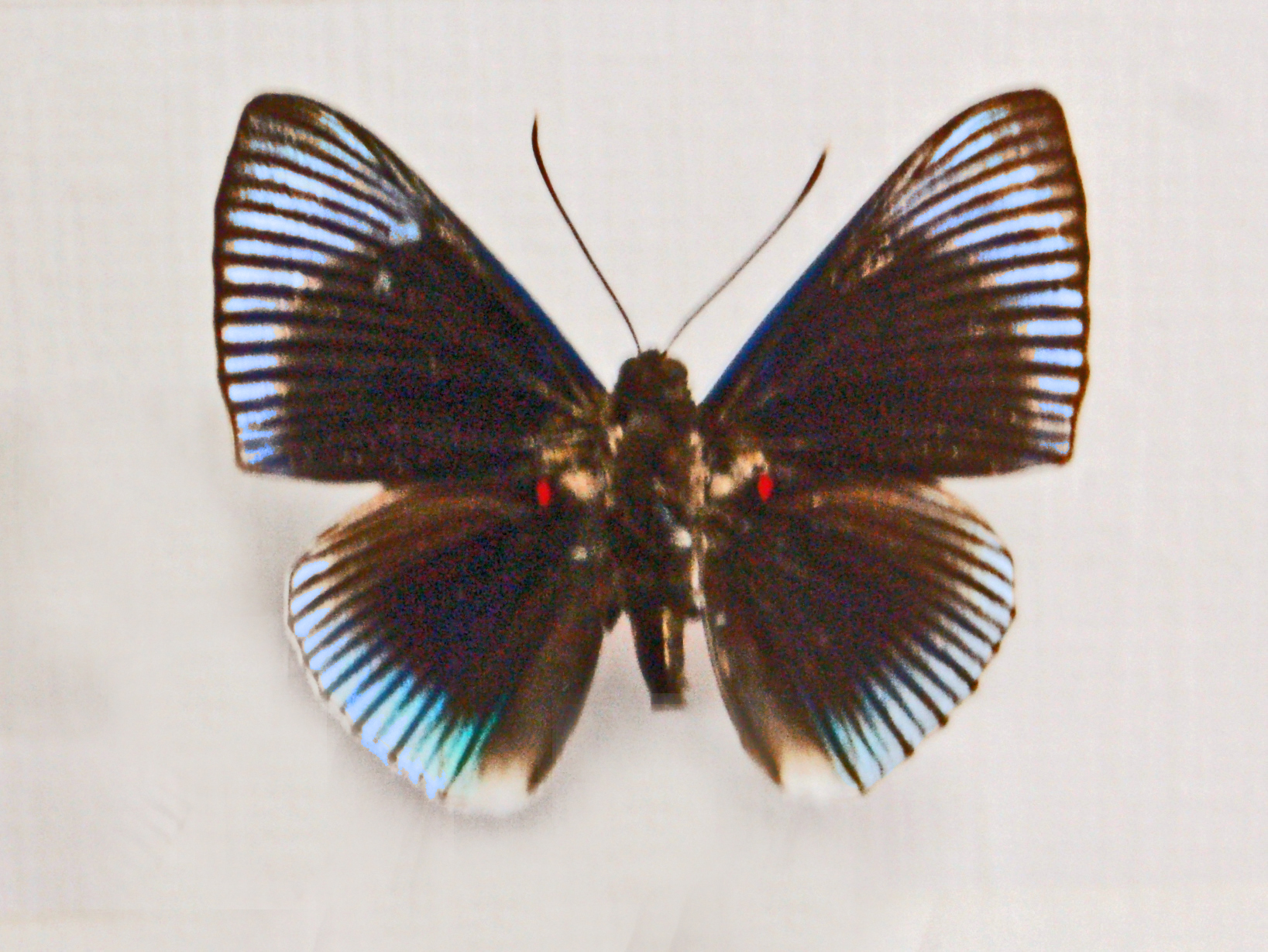
- Dorsal view of Lyropteryx apollonia at National Museum (Prague)
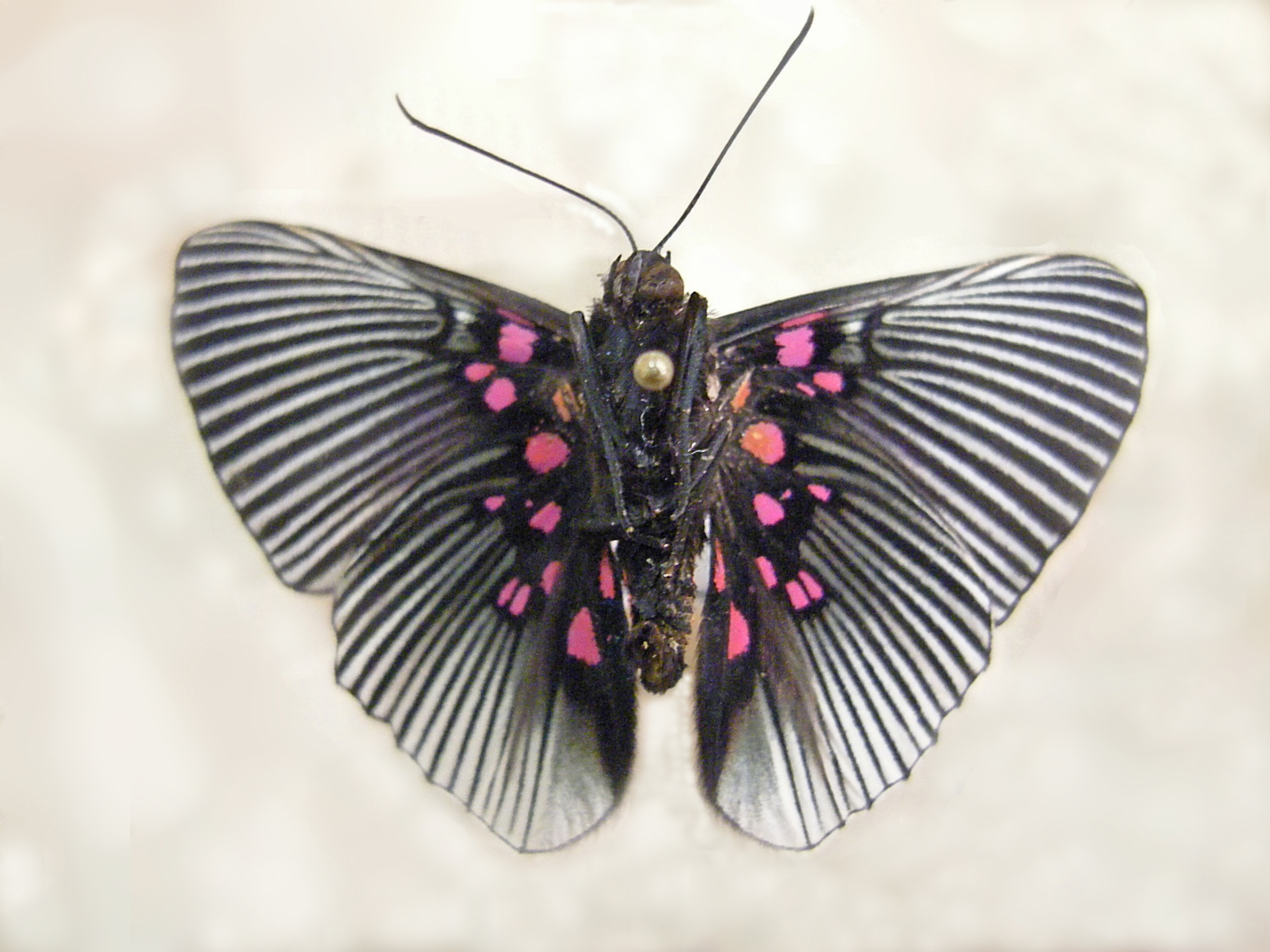
- Underside

Scientific classification
- Domain: Eukaryota
- Kingdom: Animalia
- Phylum: Arthropoda
- Class: Insecta
- Order: Lepidoptera
- Family: Riodinidae
- Subfamily: Riodininae
- Genus: Lyropteryx; Westwood, 1851

= Lyropteryx =

Genus of butterflies

Lyropteryx is a genus of butterflies of the family Riodinidae. Species of this genus are widespread in the tropical areas of the South America.

== Description ==
Forewings are large, subtriangular, while the hindwings are relatively small. In most of species of this genus, the upper surface of the wings is black, with numerous longitudinal streaks of metallic blue-green colours on the outer half. The undersides are black, with the basal half spotted with purple pink and the outer half with black and white stripes.

== List of species ==
This genus include four species:

- Lyropteryx apollonia Westwood, 1851 Brazil, Peru, Bolivia, Ecuador
- Lyropteryx diadocis Stichel, 1910 Brazil
- Lyropteryx lyra Saunders, 1859 Panama, Mexico, Colombia, Ecuador, Brazil
- Lyropteryx terpsichore Westwood, 1851 Paraguay, Brazil
