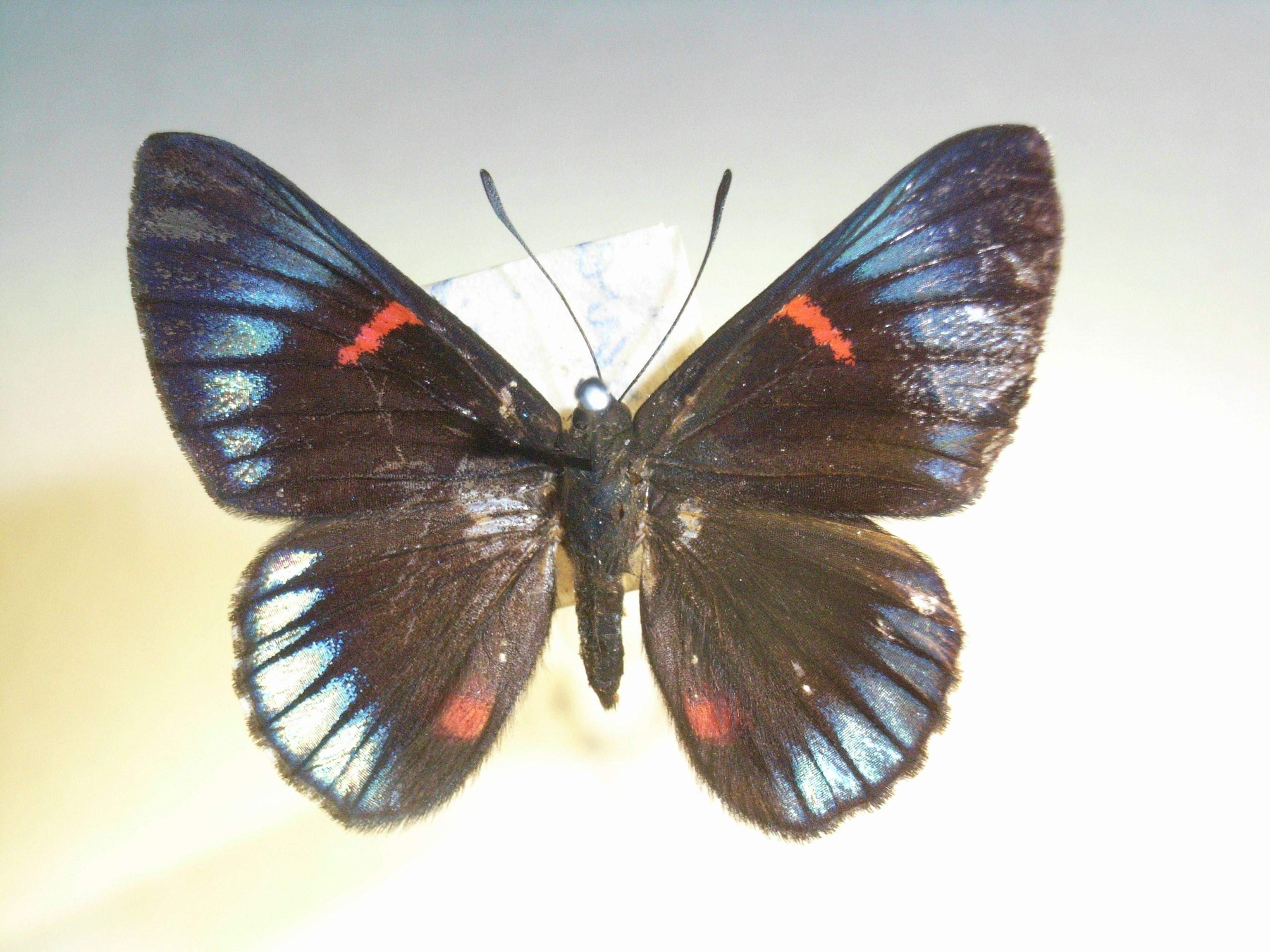
- Necyria bellona westwoodi

Scientific classification
- Domain: Eukaryota
- Kingdom: Animalia
- Phylum: Arthropoda
- Class: Insecta
- Order: Lepidoptera
- Family: Riodinidae
- Tribe: Riodinini
- Genus: Necyria; Westwood, 1851

= Necyria =

Genus of butterflies

Necyria is a Neotropical metalmark butterfly genus.

There are three species which all have colourful iridescent markings. They are forest insects. Some are part of mimetic complexes.

The genus was erected by John Obadiah Westwood in 1851. The subspecies shown in the taxobox is named in Westwood's honour.

== Species ==
- Necyria bellona
- Necyria ingaretha Nicaragua.
- Necyria duellona Panama, Nicaragua, Guatemala, Colombia, Ecuador, Brazil.
