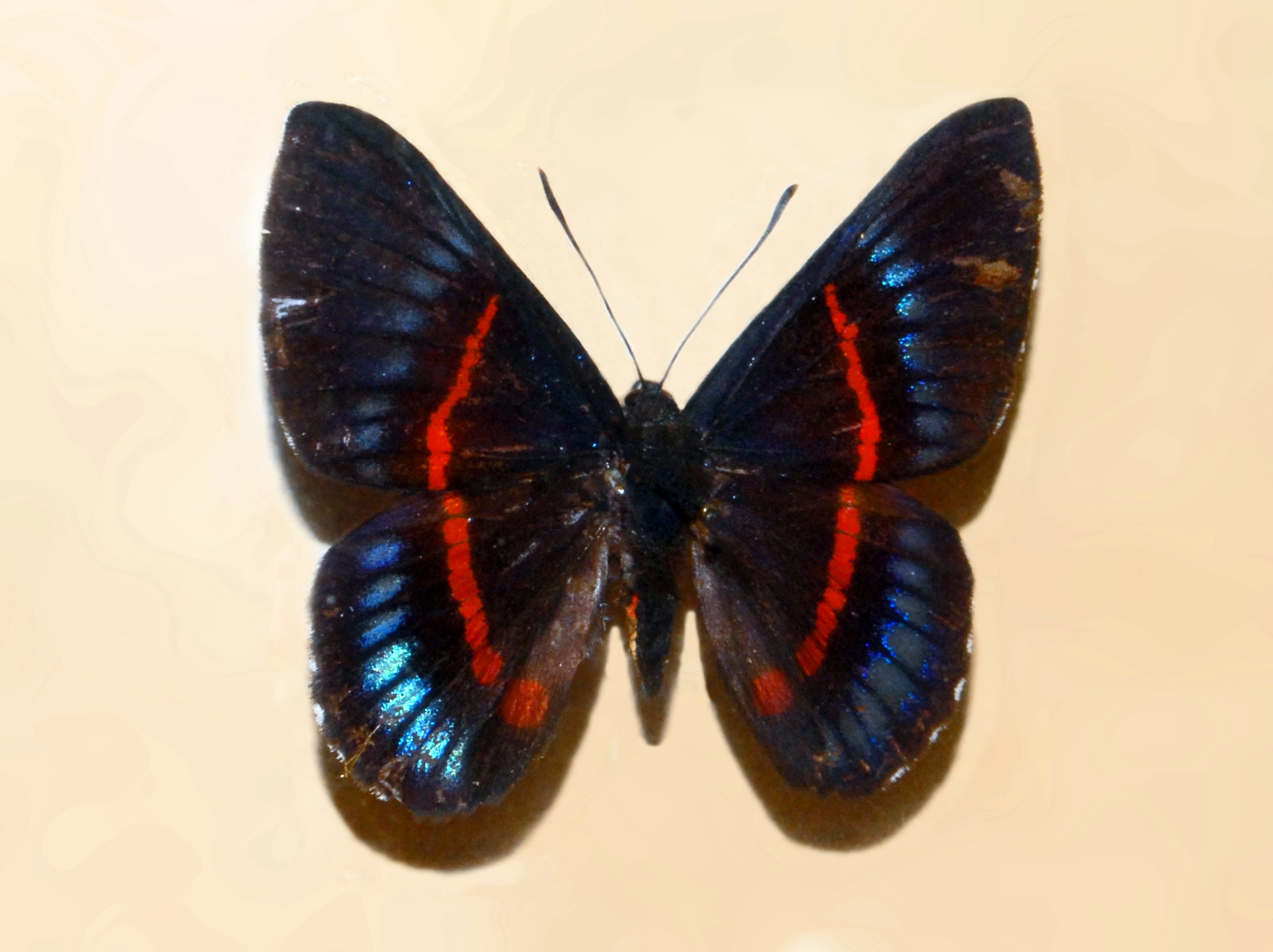
- Specimen of N. b. manco from Colombia

Scientific classification
- Domain: Eukaryota
- Kingdom: Animalia
- Phylum: Arthropoda
- Class: Insecta
- Order: Lepidoptera
- Family: Riodinidae
- Genus: Necyria
- Species: N. bellona

Binomial name
- Necyria bellona Westwood, 1851

= Necyria bellona =

Bellona metalmark

Species of butterfly

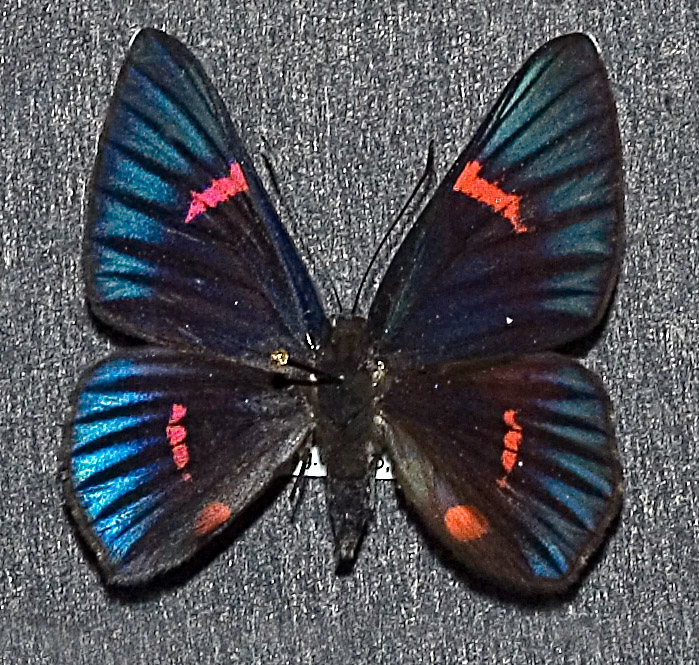
Mounted specimen

Necyria bellona, the bellona metalmark, is a butterfly of the family Riodinidae. It is found in most of South America.

== Description ==
Necyria bellona has a wingspan of 30–40 mm. Body is rather slender. Wings are deep black, more or less glossed, with metallic bright red spots or curved red and glossy blue bands.

== Subspecies ==
The following subspecies are recognised:

- N. b. bellona (Bolivia)
- N. b. saundersii (Colombia and Ecuador)
- N. b. manco (Colombia)
- N. b. juturna (Colombia)
- N. b. westwoodi (Peru)
- N. b. whitelyiana (Peru)
- N. b. zaneta (Ecuador)
- N. b. gerhardi (Colombia)
- N. b. ahrenholzi (Peru)
