= Recurring Saturday Night Live characters and sketches introduced 1996–97 =

The following is a list of recurring Saturday Night Live characters and sketches introduced between September 28, 1996, and May 17, 1997, the twenty-second season of SNL.

== The Ambiguously Gay Duo ==
A cartoon by Robert Smigel, part of the Saturday TV Funhouse series. Originally appeared on the Dana Carvey Show. Debuted September 28, 1996.

Appearances

Season	Episode	Host	Episode Title
22	September 28, 1996	Tom Hanks	It Takes Two To Tango
22	November 2, 1996	Chris Rock	Queen of Terror
22	December 14, 1996	Rosie O'Donnell	Don We Now... Or Never
22	April 19, 1997	Pamela Anderson	Safety Tips
23	November 15, 1997	Claire Danes	Blow Hot, Blow Cold
23	May 9, 1998	David Duchovny	A Hard One To Swallow
24	November 21, 1998	Jennifer Love Hewitt	The Ambiguously Gay Duo Fan Club
24	May 8, 1999	Cuba Gooding Jr.	AmbiguoBoys
25	May 13, 2000	Britney Spears	Trouble Coming Twice
28	October 19, 2002	John McCain	The Third Leg Of Justice
33	September 29, 2007	LeBron James	First Served, First Come
36	May 14, 2011	Ed Helms	The Dark, Clenched Hole Of Evil

== Mr. Peepers ==
Mr. Peepers was a part-monkey/part-human character created and portrayed by Chris Kattan. His signature bits of physical comedy involved eating apples one after another in rapid succession, and spitting out the pieces machine gun style. Often he would spit the apple chunks directly at characters in the scene. His other physical act was dry humping other characters, with the recipient of the act getting reprimanded when they tried to push him off.

Mr. Peepers was first introduced as an animal act brought out by John Barbary (played by Tom Hanks) on a parody of The Tonight Show (with Darrell Hammond as Jay Leno). In an episode in the 25th season, "Papa Peepers" (played by The Rock) was revealed to be Mr. Peepers's father. Another memorable sketch was a parody of an episode of Dawson's Creek, featuring Katie Holmes as Joey, the character she played on that show. On the Weekend Update segment of the May 17, 2003 episode, Chris Kattan performed a lightning-round montage of his most popular characters and assumed the character of Mr. Peepers for a brief moment during that bit. It was the final episode of the 2002–2003 season and also Kattan's last episode as a cast member.

Appearances

Season	Episode	Host	Notes
22	September 28, 1996	Tom Hanks	
22	January 11, 1997	Kevin Spacey	
22	March 15, 1997	Sting	
23	November 15, 1997	Claire Danes	
24	October 3, 1998	Kelsey Grammer	
24	December 5, 1998	Vince Vaughn	
25	November 20, 1999	Jennifer Aniston	
25	December 11, 1999	Danny DeVito	
25	March 18, 2000	The Rock	
26	November 4, 2000	Charlize Theron	
26	February 24, 2001	Katie Holmes	
27	April 6, 2002	Cameron Diaz	

== Kincaid ==
Played by Ana Gasteyer, Kincaid was a fast-talking MTV VJ. Her main schtick was reminiscing about old sitcoms like Diff'rent Strokes and What's Happening!!. Sketch debuted September 28, 1996.

== Gene, the Ex-Convict ==
A Colin Quinn sketch. Debuted October 5, 1996.

Appearances

Season	Episode	Host	Notes
22	October 5, 1996	Lisa Kudrow	
23	December 6, 1997	Nathan Lane	

== The Quiet Storm ==
The Quiet Storm was a radio show hosted by Chris "Champagne" Garnett (Tim Meadows). Garnett would frequently have problems while on the air, but he would remain in his smooth radio announcer voice while saying things like "You sons of bitches, you can kiiiiss myy aaaaass" and "I just buuuurned mah haaaand... with scaaalding hot coffee". Debuted October 19, 1996.

Appearances

Season	Episode	Host	Notes
22	October 19, 1996	Bill Pullman	
22	February 22, 1997	Alec Baldwin	
23	December 6, 1997	Nathan Lane	

== The Culps ==
The Culps, or "The Culp Family Musical Performances", were recurring characters that appeared on SNL between 1996 and 2002, and were portrayed by Will Ferrell (as Marty Culp), and Ana Gasteyer (as Bobbi Mohan-Culp). Marty and Bobbi were an awkward, unstylish, married couple who served as music teachers at Altadena Middle School. In the sketches, they would perform prim, conservative medleys of modern pop, R&B or rap songs at various school functions, much to the embarrassment of their unseen son who attended the school; when Claire Danes hosted, she played their college-student daughter, embarrassed beyond words when her parents performed during Career Day.

Marty played the keyboard and sings backup, while Bobbi was the lead vocalist, who sang in a high-pitched, operatic style. In between medleys, the Culps make comments to the audience of middle school students, often implying that the children are mocking them, most often by showing them the finger. Debuted November 2, 1996.

The Culps followed in the tradition of earlier skits that began with 1970s' Nick The Lounge Singer and continued in the 1980s with The Sweeney Sisters. The basic premise is that the singers, who usually perform in bottom-of-the-barrel gigs, sing modern songs in their own unique style, but are totally oblivious to how unstylish and "cheesy" their performances are.

Ferrell and Gasteyer reprised their roles in 2012 when Ferrell hosted the May 12th episode. The couple had a gig at an LGBT prom. They later returned for the 40th anniversary special on February 15, 2015, in a tribute of musical sketches, and at SNL50: The Homecoming Concert in 2025.

Appearances

Season	Episode	Host	Notes
22	November 2, 1996	Chris Rock	
22	February 15, 1997	Chevy Chase	
22	May 10, 1997	John Goodman	
23	November 15, 1997	Claire Danes	
23	December 13, 1997	Helen Hunt	
23	February 14, 1998	Roma Downey	
23	April 11, 1998	Greg Kinnear	
24	October 17, 1998	Lucy Lawless	
24	January 9, 1999	Bill Paxton	
24	May 15, 1999	Sarah Michelle Gellar	
25	November 6, 1999	Dylan McDermott	
25	February 5, 2000	Alan Cumming	
25	May 20, 2000	Jackie Chan	
26	November 11, 2000	Calista Flockhart	
26	January 13, 2001	Charlie Sheen	
26	April 14, 2001	Renee Zellweger	
27	September 29, 2001	Reese Witherspoon	
27	December 15, 2001	Ellen DeGeneres	
27	April 6, 2002	Cameron Diaz	
37	May 12, 2012	Will Ferrell	

== The Delicious Dish ==
The Delicious Dish is a culinary-themed radio show hosted by Margaret Jo McCullen (Ana Gasteyer) and Teri Rialto (Molly Shannon). The show is presented as a parody of public radio (and in particular, NPR), with very quiet, low-key hosts and dull, specialized subject matter. The pleasant, modest hosts are typically quite taken with the sometimes crushingly dry subject being discussed—albeit in an extremely reserved (but unfailingly chipper) way. The SNL episode's host will play a guest appearing on "The Delicious Dish", who is typically portrayed as being just as uncharismatic as the hosts. When Molly Shannon left the show during the 2000–2001 season, Rialto was replaced by the new co-host Lynn Bershad, played by Rachel Dratch.

In an interview with the real NPR, Gasteyer cited The Splendid Table, and Good Food—a local program on member station KCRW—as influences on the sketch. She noted that because of the lack of commercials, a show could easily "take [its] time and explore a subject to the point that people want to weep with boredom".

The most well-known edition of the sketch featured host Alec Baldwin as the chef Pete Schweddy—whose store sells the Christmas dish "Schweddy Balls". The two hosts remained consistently oblivious to the various double entendres being used by Schweddy to describe the dish (relating to "balls" as a slang term for testicles), such as stating that the balls can be bought in a "sack", and boasting that "no one can resist my Schweddy Balls." In 2014, Rolling Stone named the "Schweddy Balls" sketch the 20th best SNL sketch of all time, noting that "those who didn't get the joke on first utterance would get multiple chances." So iconic was this simple bit of wordplay that Ben & Jerry's produced an ice cream in honor of the skit in 2011 (although said flavor would also result in controversy among groups who felt that it was inappropriate for such a product).

Gasteyer and Shannon reprised their characters in a one-off revival of the sketch during the May 8, 2010 episode, with host Betty White playing guest Florence Dusty—a baker famous for her "dusty muffins".

In 2024, Gasteyer and Shannon revived their characters for Capital One advertisements where they interview Samuel L. Jackson and "Capital One Bank Guy" (Jeremy Brandt), in partnership with SNL's 50th anniversary.

Appearances

Season	Episode	Host	Notes
22	November 16, 1996	Robert Downey Jr.	
22	December 14, 1996	Rosie O'Donnell	
22	February 8, 1997	Neve Campbell	
22	May 10, 1997	John Goodman	
23	October 18, 1997	Brendan Fraser	
23	December 13, 1997	Helen Hunt	
23	March 14, 1998	Julianne Moore	
24	October 3, 1998	Kelsey Grammer	
24	December 12, 1998	Alec Baldwin	The "Schweddy Balls" episode.
25	December 11, 1999	Danny DeVito	
26	October 21, 2000	Dana Carvey	
26	February 17, 2001	Sean Hayes	
26	April 7, 2001	Alec Baldwin	First appearance by Dratch as Lynn Bershad. Baldwin reprises his character of Pete Schweddy, this time promoting his "Schweddy Wiener".
27	March 16, 2002	Ian McKellen	
35	May 8, 2010	Betty White	Gasteyer and Shannon returned to their original roles for the sketch.

== Shopping at Home Network ==
A Will Ferrell and Chris Kattan sketch. Debuted November 16, 1996.

Appearances

Season	Episode	Host	Notes
22	November 16, 1996	Robert Downey Jr.	
22	January 18, 1997	David Alan Grier	
22	March 15, 1997	Sting	Mark Hamill appears as himself.

== Cinder Calhoun ==
Portrayed by Ana Gasteyer, Calhoun was an activist, feminist singer with a boyish voice who played at the Lilith Fair festival. In one episode, she is introduced as the warm-up act for the festival. Ultra-politically correct, she would go out of her way to pronounce ethnic-named cities in their native dialect and would frequently dedicate her songs to activist causes. On a Christmas episode she sang a song called "Christmas Chainsaw Massacre", referring to the "senseless cutting down of innocent trees for our twisted holiday pleasure". She also performed the anti-Thanksgiving song "Basted in Blood" in a duet with Sarah McLachlan, referencing in her introduction as being inspired by Fiona Apple's criticism of Butterball Turkey for having a 1-800 number for turkey recipes. She professed her love for Garth Brooks in a song entitled "Adonis in Blue Jeans" when he hosted the show. Debuted November 23, 1996 in a Thanksgiving Song Auditions sketch, where she appeared as one of many singers who performed in varying styles and hers was the kind of music you would usually hear at the Lilith Fair ("What if the turkey was humannnn...?").

Appearances

Season	Episode	Host	Notes
23	September 27, 1997	Sylvester Stallone	
23	November 22, 1997	Rudy Giuliani	
23	February 28, 1998	Garth Brooks	
23	May 9, 1998	David Duchovny	
24	December 5, 1998	Vince Vaughn	

== Celebrity Jeopardy! ==
A parody of the annual celebrity tournament of the television quiz show Jeopardy!. Debuted December 7, 1996.

== Janet Reno's Dance Party ==
Janet Reno's Dance Party ("coming to you live, from my basement/the deck of a battleship") was an SNL sketch starring Will Ferrell as U.S. Attorney General Janet Reno. It aired four times and featured the song "My Sharona" by the Knack. Debuted January 11, 1997. During the dance party, Reno expressed an aversion to mosh pits and accused her youthful guests of lying during interviews. While she opposed moshing, Reno did engage in stage-diving during one episode, warning the dancing youths below to brace themselves for "180 lb of pure Reno." In most episodes, Darrell Hammond would make an appearance as then-President Bill Clinton, urging Janet to leave her basement and rejoin society; he would assure her that nobody blamed her for the events at Waco, to which Reno would respond, "DANCE PARTY TAKES AWAY WACO!". Notable guests included Donna Shalala (played by Kevin Spacey), who slow-danced with Janet; and Rudy Giuliani (played by himself), who lost to Janet in a boxing match. The last time the sketch aired, January 20, 2001, which was her last day as Attorney General, Janet Reno herself made an appearance. Will Ferrell stated:

It was all her idea to come on the show, and I was impressed with her. She talked about how important humor is to our political process. She said that when she speaks at schools, the first question she's asked is, "Have you seen the guy who plays you on Saturday Night Live?" She tells them she loves (being lampooned); it lets all the tension out of the room.

Appearances

Season	Episode	Host	Notes
22	January 11, 1997	Kevin Spacey	
22	February 8, 1997	Neve Campbell	
23	November 22, 1997	Rudy Giuliani	
26	January 20, 2001	Mena Suvari	

== The X-Presidents ==
A cartoon by Robert Smigel, part of the Saturday TV Funhouse series. Debuted January 11, 1997.

Appearances

Season	Episode	Host	Notes
22	January 11, 1997	Kevin Spacey	
22	April 12, 1997	Rob Lowe	
23	February 7, 1998	John Goodman	
24	February 6, 1999	Gwyneth Paltrow	
26	October 14, 2000	Kate Hudson	
26	January 20, 2001	Mena Suvari	
27	January 12, 2002	Josh Hartnett	The Ambiguously Gay Duo appears
28	March 8, 2003	Queen Latifah	
30	October 9, 2004	Queen Latifah	

== The Atteburys ==
An Ana Gasteyer, Mark McKinney and Will Ferrell sketch. Ginger (Gasteyer) and Leslie Attebury are a WASP couple. In the first two appearances of the sketch, Leslie Attebury was played by Mark McKinney, while Will Ferrell played Leslie in the remaining two appearances. Whenever the Atteburys encounter a family friend, Ginger draws them into conversations where she never stops talking, while Leslie stays mostly quiet and barely conceals his annoyance with his wife. Ginger's talkativeness annoys the friend to the point that they finally snap and lose their patience with her, much to her bewilderment. Debuted January 11, 1997.

Appearances

Season	Episode	Host	Notes
22	January 11, 1997	Kevin Spacey	The Atteburys are visited by a home security worker (Spacey).
22	March 15, 1997	Sting	The Atteburys meet their daughter's new boyfriend (Sting).
25	April 15, 2000	Tobey Maguire	Ginger and Leslie prepare for a tennis lesson with instructor Teddy Preston (Maguire).
27	November 10, 2001	Gwyneth Paltrow	At a party, the Atteburys talk to Cassie Winthrop (Paltrow). Ginger discusses the ongoing anthrax scares and she and Cassie make insensitive remarks to a family friend who is of Persian descent.

== Wong & Owens, Ex-Porn Stars ==
A Jim Breuer and Tracy Morgan sketch. Debuted January 18, 1997.

== The Zimmermans ==
The Zimmermans were a married couple portrayed by Chris Kattan and Cheri Oteri as Josh and Laura Zimmerman; they would often meet other couples in various settings. Normal dialogue between the Zimmermans would often change course suddenly, as the couple work one another into a sexual frenzy which typically ends just as abruptly. Each sketch typically ends with one or both members of the other couple finally adopting behavior similar to the Zimmermans after extensive baiting, at which point the Zimmermans become shocked and appalled by the other's display.

=== Episodes featuring The Zimmermans ===
- February 15, 1997 – the only Zimmermans sketch to feature them alone, which is centered on them pretending to have a first date (even though they're already married and have a baby in the other room).
- May 2, 1998 – featuring host Matthew Broderick and Molly Shannon as the Zimmermans' neighbors.
- October 24, 1998 – featuring host Ben Stiller and Ana Gasteyer as the Zimmermans' neighbors.
- February 13, 1999 – featuring host Brendan Fraser as a gym instructor.
- May 15, 1999 – featuring host Sarah Michelle Gellar and Chris Parnell as Karen and John Hopkins.
- October 16, 1999 – featuring host Heather Graham, and Will Ferrell as airplane passengers.
- February 19, 2000 – featuring host Ben Affleck and Horatio Sanz as car salesmen.
- May 20, 2000 – featuring host Jackie Chan and Molly Shannon as an interracial couple.

== The DeMarco Brothers ==
The DeMarco Brothers are played by Chris Kattan (Kyle) and Chris Parnell (Sean). The premise of the sketch is that the brothers are auditioning to be dancers on tour for a musical act (usually, whoever is the musical guest on the show that week). They would wear matching t-shirts with quotes or references to a particular song by the artist, and then play a tape of the artist's songs and proceed to dance to it. Their dancing can be described as interpretive, as they often act out a portion of the song's lyrics in the form of skits during their performance but often lack any real dancing rhythm, or talent. The musicians generally detest their performances, cutting them off before ever getting through an entire song. However, two auditions were successful: in the January 20, 2001 sketch, Lenny Kravitz, while initially dismissive, empathizes with the pair and hires them over the objections of his tour manager (host Mena Suvari), and on the May 11, 2002 episode, in which host Kirsten Dunst joins them as their cousin Tamara, Eminem ended the audition with many of the same insults other artists had used to describe their performance—but since this was exactly what the rapper wanted out of his backup dancers, they got the job. Debuted (solely Kattan) March 15, 1997.

== Dominican Lou ==
Dominican Lou (played by Tracy Morgan) is the building superintendent at 1901 Burnside Avenue in the Bronx. Debuted March 22, 1997.

On his Weekend Update appearance from the 1998 Cameron Diaz episode (which happened to be his last Update appearance), he attempted to sell Colin Quinn the signed 62nd home run ball of his fellow countryman Sammy Sosa for $1 million, even though it was later discovered to be a foul ball hit by Gary Gaetti and signed by Dominican Lou.

He also did the weather report on Good Morning, Bronx on the February 10, 2001 ep hosted by Jennifer Lopez, claiming that the weather in the Bronx will be "vetty cold!".

On October 17, 1998, Dominican Lou was impersonated by Chucky on Weekend Update, shortly after Chucky appeared as himself and tried to pull a knife on Colin ("Wanna grab a beeeer, Colin?" "I don't think so, Chucky." "I'm serious, Colin! I wanna have this beer!").

Appearances

Season	Episode	Host	Notes
22	March 22, 1997	Mike Myers	
22	May 10, 1997	John Goodman	
23	May 9, 1998	David Duchovny	
24	September 26, 1998	Cameron Diaz	

== Goth Talk ==
A late-night Tampa Bay Public-access television cable TV show hosted by goth high school students Azrael Abyss, Prince of Sorrows (Chris Kattan), and Circe Nightshade (Molly Shannon). The show, recorded in Azrael's home, begins with the theme song "Bela Lugosi's Dead" by Bauhaus and a station identification bumper, from "Channel 33: Sunshine State Cable Access." The hosts speak in a melodramatic, woeful tone, and wear dark gothic fashion and black makeup. Azrael speaks in a grating, high-pitched voice and frequently makes noises like a cat. They try to be as dark and gothic as possible, making regular references to death and the macabre, but always end in matters that are quite in contrast to both, prompting them to end the show abruptly with the slogan "Stay out of the daylight!".

Recurring themes include Azrael's job at Cinnabon and interruptions by his bullying older brother Glenn Henderson (Jim Breuer), a stereotypical jock. Glenn ruins the goth mood by turning on the light in the garage and calling Azrael and Circe by their real names, Todd* (Henderson) and Stephanie. Often the dark aspects of their lives are juxtaposed with their surroundings, such as the time they mused that "The Tampa Bay Lightning aren't very goth." The show's sponsor is a clothing store called "The Gloom Room," with the slogan "It's an orgy of the macabre... located right next to the Pizza Hut on Hibiscus Road." Guests on the show are touted for their dark and sinister character, but are soon revealed to have regular pedestrian lives. Baron Nocturna (Will Ferrell) appeared in three sketches; Nocturna, whose real name is Gordy, is an employee at Cinnabon (later Dunkin' Donuts) and a friend of Abyss and Nightshade. In one appearance, Nocturna was scheduled to appear on the show but was "pantsed" and thrown in their pool by Glenn and his friend (Chris Farley).

* (though he hates that name and it being used)

Appearances

Season	Episode	Host	Notes
22	April 12, 1997	Rob Lowe	Lowe appears as "The Beholder"
22	May 17, 1997	Jeff Goldblum	Goldblum appears as "Count Feedback"
23	October 25, 1997	Chris Farley	Farley appears as Glenn's friend who assists him with bullying Azrael
23	January 17, 1998	Sarah Michelle Gellar	Gellar appears as "Countess Cobwella"
23	April 4, 1998	Steve Buscemi	Buscemi appears as Glenn, Todd and Stephanie's school custodian Tony "Baloney" Fontaine
24	October 17, 1998	Lucy Lawless	Lawless appears as "Baroness Blackbroom"
25	December 4, 1999	Christina Ricci	Ricci appears as "Hezabiah of the Dusk"
26	November 4, 2000	Charlize Theron	Theron appears as Marla, host of a Blair Witch Tour

== Collette Reardon ==
A Cheri Oteri sketch. Debuted May 10, 1997. Collette Reardon was a disheveled middle-aged woman who appeared to be significantly impaired by some drug or mixture of drugs. In the first two sketches, she would show up in a pharmacy with a stack of numerous prescriptions for unbelievably large supplies and large doses of an assortment of drugs, most of which were notorious for being addictive. Some of the prescriptions would be for clearly recreational use, such as peyote buttons, that would not be available in a real-life pharmacy. The pharmacist (played by the guest host of the episode) was naturally skeptical of the legitimacy of the prescriptions. Subsequently, she appeared on Weekend Update as an "expert" and in situations where her impairment was particularly inappropriate.

During the course of some of her appearances, it was mentioned that Collette drove a school bus for a living.

Appearances:

- May 10, 1997: Host John Goodman as the skeptical pharmacist.
- Oct. 18, 1997: Host Brendan Fraser as the skeptical pharmacist.
- Nov. 14, 1998: Host Joan Allen. In this installment, Collette appears as a pharmaceutics "expert" on Weekend Update.
- Apr. 10, 1999: Host John Goodman. Collette again shares her expertise on Weekend Update.
- Nov. 6, 1999: Host Dylan McDermott. Collette is visited by a telephone repairman (McDermott) at her home.
- Mar. 11, 2000: Host Joshua Jackson. Collette embarrasses her nephew (Jackson) when she visits him at his school.

Preceded by Recurring Saturday Night Live characters and sketches introduced 1995–96	Recurring Saturday Night Live characters and sketches (listed chronologically)	Succeeded by Recurring Saturday Night Live characters and sketches introduced 1997–98
