= Saturday Night Live season 31 =

Season of American sketch comedy series

Saturday Night Live
- Season 31
- No. of episodes: 19

Release
- Original network: NBC
- Original release: October 1, 2005 – May 20, 2006

Season chronology
- ← Previous season 30 Next → season 32

The thirty-first season of Saturday Night Live, an American sketch comedy series, originally aired in the United States on NBC between October 1, 2005, and May 20, 2006. 19 episodes were produced (rather than the usual 20) due to the 2006 Winter Olympics and network budget cuts.

== History ==
This season is notable for the people who hosted the show. Julia Louis-Dreyfus, an SNL cast member from 1982 to 1985 under Dick Ebersol, became the first former female cast member to come back and host the show (and also the third cast member from Seinfeld to host). Gilda Radner was originally supposed to host in 1988, but could not due to the Writers Guild of America strike and then Radner's death the following year. This season is also known for the return of such frequent hosts as Alec Baldwin (who last hosted in season 29 with musical guest Missy Elliott in 2003), Tom Hanks (who last hosted the first episode of season 22 with musical guest Tom Petty and the Heartbreakers in 1996), and Steve Martin (who last hosted the first episode of season 20 with musical guest Eric Clapton in 1994).

This season saw the seventh death of a former cast member, Charles Rocket (a cast member during the Jean Doumanian-produced 1980–1981 season), who committed suicide six days after the premiere. Rocket's suicide is the first death of an SNL cast member who never worked under Lorne Michaels (until Tony Rosato, who worked under Dick Ebersol, passed away in 2017), and is the first death of a Weekend Update anchor until Norm Macdonald in 2021.

This season was the first to broadcast in high-definition (HD), after 30 years of broadcasting in standard definition.

== Cast ==
Before the start of the season, featured player Rob Riggle was let go from the show after one season. Finesse Mitchell and Kenan Thompson were both promoted to repertory status, while Jason Sudeikis remained a featured player.

The show added three new cast members: Los Angeles-based improviser Bill Hader, Andy Samberg (the show also hired his two friends Akiva Schaffer and Jorma Taccone as writers, all members of The Lonely Island sketch group) and Kristen Wiig of The Groundlings. Wiig debuted on the show in November, in the episode hosted by Jason Lee. Samberg, Schaffer, and Taccone would be a notable force for creating SNL Digital Shorts. One such short was "Lazy Sunday".

Tina Fey and Maya Rudolph missed episodes due to maternity leave. Fey's place on Weekend Update was briefly taken over by Horatio Sanz until her return in the episode hosted by Catherine Zeta-Jones. Fey returned to the show before her maternity leave time was up. Rudolph, however, appeared on the first episode of the new season, and then went on maternity leave and returned in February, in the episode hosted by Steve Martin.

This would be the final season for Fey, Rachel Dratch, Mitchell, Chris Parnell, and Sanz, as well as the last for longtime director Beth McCarthy-Miller. Dratch and Fey both left the show to focus on 30 Rock. McCarthy-Miller left on her own terms and was replaced by Don Roy King. Parnell, Sanz, and Mitchell were let go due to NBC budget cuts.

=== Cast roster ===
**Repertory players**

- Fred Armisen
- Rachel Dratch
- **Tina Fey**
- Will Forte
- Darrell Hammond
- Seth Meyers
- Finesse Mitchell
- Chris Parnell
- **Amy Poehler**
- Maya Rudolph
- **Horatio Sanz**
- Kenan Thompson

**Featured players**

- Bill Hader
- Andy Samberg
- Jason Sudeikis
- Kristen Wiig (first episode: November 12, 2005)

bold denotes Weekend Update anchor

== Writers ==
There were three head writers for the 31st season: Harper Steele, Tina Fey, and Seth Meyers.

Meyers (who had been a cast member since 2001) was initially named as the sole writing supervisor at the start of the season, and was named as co-head writer with the Scarlett Johansson-hosted episode.

Future cast member Colin Jost joined the writing staff this season. As do Samberg's Lonely Island cohorts Akiva Schaffer and Jorma Taccone, as well as future head writer/Senior Writer Bryan Tucker.

Paula Pell returned to the show mid-season, after leaving at the end of the previous season, due to her sitcom Thick and Thin failing.

Longtime writer Jim Downey skipped this season but would return with the next season.

Lastly, in addition to Fey (who had been a writer for nine years since 1997 and head writer since 1999), this was also the final season for fellow writers T. Sean Shannon (a writer for eight years since 1998), Frank Sebastiano (a writer overall for 8½ accumulative years from 1995–1998; and had been back since 2001), J. B. Smoove (who joined the writing staff in 2003, and departed after three seasons), and Liz Cackowski (who joined the writing staff in 2004, and departed after 2½ years). It is unknown if Shannon, Sebastiano, Smoove, and/or Cackowski left on their own, or if they were let go due to the budget cuts.

== Episodes ==
No. overall	No. in season	Host	Musical guest	Original release date
586	1	Steve Carell	Kanye West	October 1, 2005
Kanye West performs a medley of "Gold Digger" and "Touch the Sky", and "Heard 'Em Say" with Adam Levine.; Mike Myers appears before West's first performance, spoofing their joint appearance in A Concert for Hurricane Relief.; Horatio Sanz's first of two episodes substituting for Tina Fey as Weekend Update co-anchor; Bill Hader and Andy Samberg's first episode as cast members.; This is the first SNL episode to broadcast in high-definition (HD).
587	2	Jon Heder	Ashlee Simpson	October 8, 2005
Ashlee Simpson performs "Catch Me When I Fall" and "Boyfriend".
588	3	Catherine Zeta-Jones	Franz Ferdinand	October 22, 2005
Franz Ferdinand performs "Do You Want To" and "Take Me Out".; A still photo of former Jean Doumanian-era cast member and Weekend Update anchor Charles Rocket, who had committed suicide the week before this episode premiered, is shown in his memory after Weekend Update.; Tina Fey's first episode back as Weekend Update co-anchor.
589	4	Lance Armstrong	Sheryl Crow	October 29, 2005
Sheryl Crow, Armstrong's then-fiancé, performs "Good Is Good" and "Strong Enough". Additionally, Crow appears in the opening monologue, the "Harmonies" sketch, and the "Lance's Song" sketch.; Chicago White Sox outfielder Scott Podsednik appears on Weekend Update.
590	5	Jason Lee	Foo Fighters	November 12, 2005
Foo Fighters perform "DOA" and "Best of You".; Kristen Wiig's first episode as a cast member.; In reruns, the Butt Pregnancy sketch is replaced by a dress rehearsal sketch featuring the cast singing a song about the office cafeteria dessert counter.
591	6	Eva Longoria	Korn	November 19, 2005
Korn performs "Twisted Transistor" and "Freak on a Leash".
592	7	Dane Cook	James Blunt	December 3, 2005
James Blunt performs "You're Beautiful" and "Goodbye My Lover".
593	8	Alec Baldwin	Shakira	December 10, 2005
Shakira performs "Don't Bother" and "La Tortura" with Alejandro Sanz.; Tim Meadows appears during the opening monologue.; A clip of the "Word Association" sketch from the first season's Richard Pryor/Gil Scott-Heron episode is shown after Weekend Update, commemorating Pryor's death earlier that day.
594	9	Jack Black	Neil Young	December 17, 2005
Neil Young performs "It's a Dream" and "He Was the King". Additionally, Young appears in the "Appalachian Emergency Room" sketch.; Johnny Knoxville appears in the "Appalachian Emergency Room" sketch.; Darlene Love provides vocals for TV Funhouse cartoon "Christmastime For The Jews" and performs "White Christmas" with the SNL Band.; Tracy Morgan appears on Weekend Update.; Black's Tenacious D partner Kyle Gass appears during the "Spelling Bee" sketch.
595	10	Scarlett Johansson	Death Cab for Cutie	January 14, 2006
Death Cab for Cutie performs "Soul Meets Body" and "Crooked Teeth".; An excerpt from the night's TV Funhouse cartoon "The 700 Gang" was used as the cold open, marking the only time a cartoon was used as an SNL cold open.
596	11	Peter Sarsgaard	The Strokes	January 21, 2006
The Strokes perform "Juicebox" and "You Only Live Once".; Drew Barrymore (Strokes drummer Fabrizio Moretti's then-girlfriend) appears on Weekend Update.; A number of technical issues plagued the "Fairmount Suites Inn" sketch, such as Sarsgaard accidentally disabling the television and visible stagehands.; During the parody of the film Shattered Glass centered on a cat magazine journalist (Peter Sarsgaard) getting fired for publishing misinformation, Seth Meyers' character mentions a magazine called Parrot Companion Quarterly. In the NBC reruns of this sketch, a lower-third caption was added that says Parrot Companion Quarterly was a real publication and not something made up by the show writers.
597	12	Steve Martin	Prince	February 4, 2006
Prince performs "Fury" and "Beautiful, Loved and Blessed" with Támar.; Alec Baldwin and Kelly Ripa appear in the pre-filmed cold open. Baldwin also appears in the "Backstage" sketch.; Jimmy Fallon appears in the "Backstage" sketch.; Scarlett Johansson, Conan O'Brien, Brian Williams and Gideon Yago appear in the SNL Digital Short.; Cast member Finesse Mitchell did not appear in this episode.; This episode was the highest rated episode of the season, drawing 9.3 million viewers.
598	13	Natalie Portman	Fall Out Boy	March 4, 2006
Fall Out Boy performs "Dance, Dance" and "Sugar, We're Goin Down".; Dennis Haysbert appears in the "Belated Black History Moment" sketch.
599	14	Matt Dillon	Arctic Monkeys	March 11, 2006
Arctic Monkeys perform "I Bet You Look Good on the Dancefloor" and "A Certain Romance". Lead singer Alex Turner became visibly frustrated with the audience reaction during the latter performance, at one point pointing into the crowd and singing "That man just yawned!" to the music.
600	15	Antonio Banderas	Mary J. Blige	April 8, 2006
Mary J. Blige performs "Be Without You" and "Enough Cryin".; Chris Kattan appears on Weekend Update.
601	16	Lindsay Lohan	Pearl Jam	April 15, 2006
Pearl Jam performs "World Wide Suicide" and "Severed Hand".; Lohan's brother Michael Lohan Jr. appears in the opening monologue.
602	17	Tom Hanks	Red Hot Chili Peppers	May 6, 2006
Red Hot Chili Peppers perform "Dani California" and "Give It Away".
603	18	Julia Louis-Dreyfus	Paul Simon	May 13, 2006
Paul Simon performs "How Can You Live in the Northeast?" and "Outrageous".; Al Gore appears in the cold open and on Weekend Update, the latter written by his daughter and former SNL writer Kristin Gore.; Louis-Dreyfus' former Seinfeld co-stars Jason Alexander and Jerry Seinfeld appear in the pre-filmed portion of the opening monologue.; SNL writer and future cast member Colin Jost makes his first appearance on the show appearing as an extra in The Morning Show sketch.; A photo of former SNL cameraman Al Camoin who had died two days earlier was shown before the goodnights.
604	19	Kevin Spacey	Nelly Furtado	May 20, 2006
Nelly Furtado performs "Promiscuous" and "Maneater" with Timbaland.; Rachel Dratch, Tina Fey, Finesse Mitchell, Chris Parnell and Horatio Sanz's final episode as cast members.; Fey's final episode as Weekend Update co-anchor.; Beth McCarthy Miller's final episode as director.

== Specials ==
Title	Original release date
"The Best of David Spade"	October 15, 2005
The special presented material featuring David Spade during his stint on the show. Sketches include "Dick Clark's Receptionist", "Gap Girls", "Total Bastard Airlines", "Spade in America", "Stewart Release", "Salon", "Stunt Double", Sean Penn's Celebrity Roast", "Peer Pressure at Valley High", "Dirtball and Burnout Convention", "Karl's Video", "NCI Long Distance", "The Road to Self-Improvement", and "Hollywood Minute".
"The Best of SNL Commercial Parodies"	November 5, 2005
The special presented commercial parodies featured on the show.
"Lost & Found: SNL in the '80s"	November 13, 2005
Topics of the special include: the Jean Doumanian era as one of SNL's many critical and ratings low points, the cancellation, retooling, and reviving of SNL courtesy of Dick Ebersol and Doumanian-era stand-outs Eddie Murphy and Joe Piscopo, Murphy and Piscopo emerging as the driving force behind Ebersol's 1981-1984 seasons, Ebersol picking a new cast for season 10 after the departure of Murphy and Piscopo, Lorne Michaels returning to the show and hiring a young cast of semi-famous actors and actresses and the harsh critical response from that decision leading to yet another threat of cancellation, and the second golden age of SNL with season 11 survivors Nora Dunn, Jon Lovitz, A. Whitney Brown, and Dennis Miller and new cast members Dana Carvey, Phil Hartman, Victoria Jackson, Jan Hooks, Kevin Nealon, and Mike Myers. James Belushi, A. Whitney Brown, Dana Carvey, Billy Crystal, Denny Dillon, Robin Duke, Nora Dunn, Dick Ebersol, Al Franken, Gilbert Gottfried, Mary Gross, Victoria Jackson, Tim Kazurinsky, Gary Kroeger, Neil Levy, Julia Louis-Dreyfus, Jon Lovitz, Gail Matthius, Lorne Michaels, Kevin Nealon, Conan O'Brien, Joe Piscopo, Martin Short, Robert Smigel, Terry Sweeney and Bob Tischler gave insight for the special.
"The Best of TV Funhouse"	April 29, 2006
The special presented TV Funhouse material featured on the show. The special was hosted by The Ambiguously Gay Duo, Ace and Gary. Jimmy Fallon cameos near the end of the show. Sketches include "The Ambiguously Gay Duo", "The All-New Adventures of Mr. T", "Fun With Real Audio", "E! Cartoons' The Smurfette Show", "The X-Presidents", "The Religetables" (DVD version only) and "Conspiracy Theory Rock" (DVD version only).
