= Recurring Saturday Night Live characters and sketches introduced 1997–98 =

The following is a list of recurring Saturday Night Live characters and sketches introduced between September 27, 1997, and May 9, 1998, the twenty-third season of SNL.

== Leon Phelps, The Ladies Man ==
Tim Meadows portrayed Leon Phelps, a.k.a. "The Ladies Man", in this popular series of sketches. Debuted October 4, 1997. Phelps (who is stuck in a 1970s mentality, is obsessed with Delta Burke, and speaks with a lisp) hosts a television show (The Ladies Man) where he takes calls and delivers sexual advice. However, Phelps's advice is always outrageous, ridiculous, and generally inaccurate, often suggesting "the butt" no matter what the caller had asked. Every time a woman calls, Phelps says, "Ooooh! It's a lady!" Phelps is always seen with a glass of Courvoisier, a brand of fine Cognac. Another notable episode had Meadows ingesting an entire vial of Viagra to test its effects, when he suddenly realizes he goes overboard when he is aroused by a photo of Sally Jesse Raphael (Phelps appears later on that week, showing up in an ad for Viagra where he is the only person who accepts it).

More than once he has confused a man with a woman and expressed horror and repulsion afterwards.

The Ladies Man was one of two sketches that featured the real Monica Lewinsky when she appeared on the May 8, 1999 episode hosted by Cuba Gooding Jr. In a sketch in the 1998-99 season premiere, Phelps pretended that he was President Clinton and relived three of Monica's scenes with the President and how the "Ladies Man" would have acted out those same scenes.

This sketch became one of a handful of SNL sketches to spawn its own feature film, titled The Ladies Man.

Appearances

| Season | Episode | Host | Notes |
|---|---|---|---|
| 23 | October 4, 1997 | Matthew Perry | Leon takes some calls accompanied by stage manager Montel (Tracy Morgan). |
| 23 | November 8, 1997 | Jon Lovitz | More calls for The Ladies' Man. |
| 23 | December 13, 1997 | Helen Hunt | Leon is assisted by Charlene (Hunt) as they take calls. |
| 23 | February 14, 1998 | Roma Downey | Valentine's Day Advice. (Final appearance of Montel) |
| 23 | March 14, 1998 | Julianne Moore | The Ladies' Man Presents: Leon and Deborah Hogan (Moore) demonstrate love-making tips for relationships. |
| 23 | May 2, 1998 | Matthew Broderick | Leon takes Viagra as he takes calls, later reappears in a Viagra ad. |
| 24 | September 26, 1998 | Cameron Diaz | The Ladies' Man Presents: Leon and Julie (Diaz) act out scenes from the Starr Report. |
| 24 | November 21, 1998 | Jennifer Love Hewitt | Leon gives inappropriate advice and plugs Skanksgiving Day. |
| 24 | February 20, 1999 | Bill Murray | Stephanie Seymour helps Leon teach love lessons. |
| 24 | May 8, 1999 | Cuba Gooding Jr. | Monica Lewinsky is the guest as Linda Tripp (John Goodman) calls in. |
| 25 | October 16, 1999 | Heather Graham | RollerGirl (Graham) from Boogie Nights assists with porno reviews. |
| 25 | December 11, 1999 | Danny DeVito | Happy Holidays From The Ladies' Man |
| 25 | March 18, 2000 | The Rock | Leon falls for crossdressed undercover cop (Johnson). |
| 25 | May 20, 2000 | Jackie Chan | Who Wants To Be My Skank?: Brandy Lane (Sarah Michelle Gellar), Wilma Slossen (Gina Gershon), and Florence Henderson are Leon's choices for his summer skank.: Meadows final episode as a cast member. |
| 26 | October 7, 2000 | Rob Lowe | Leon appears on Weekend Update to discuss sex in Hollywood cinema and promote The Ladies Man. |

== Issues with Jeffrey Kaufman ==
A Jim Breuer sketch. Debuted October 18, 1997.

== Mango ==
A Chris Kattan sketch. Debuted October 18, 1997.

== Morning Latte ==
This sketch features Will Ferrell and Cheri Oteri playing two morning talk show hosts. Ferrell plays Tom Wilkins, a typical vapid and smiling male TV personality, and Oteri plays his scatterbrained female co-host, Cass Van Rye. The two are depicted as being extremely chipper, and tend to be overenthusiastic about each other's mundane life stories, and about their less-than-stellar guests. This is more than likely due to the large amounts of latte they consume during the course of a show.

The two begin the show by recounting recent events in their personal lives (in the same vein as shows like Live with Regis and Kelly, which SNL itself has parodied after Oteri and Ferrell left the show), which are almost certainly never as exciting as their reactions to them. Cass usually tells a story about herself and her husband Eli, in which she never fails to include the detail about her inability to conceive children. Tom then tells a story about a recent event involving him and his wife Gail. Cass almost immediately forgets the details of his story, prompting her to ask questions to which he has already stated the answers. There is also usually a producer off to the side who throws out random comments, which Cass inadvertently forgets over the course of the show. The producer eventually gets fed up with her absentmindedness and loses his temper, shouting obscenities (such as, "YOU STUPID BITCH!") at her. The two hosts become stunned at the reaction, until he informs them that he was "just kidding", to which they respond with incessant laughter.

They also have guests on the show, yet no matter how boring or insipid they are, the two remain extremely enthralled throughout the interview. Debuted October 25, 1997.

== Martha Stewart Living ==
Ana Gasteyer parodies Martha Stewart and her eponymous television program.

Appearances:

- October 25, 1997: Martha demonstrates how to prepare eggs for Halloween pranks.
- November 14, 1998: Host Joan Allen plays Martha's mother.
- May 8, 1999: Martha talks about her stock launch.
- November 17, 2001: Martha shows how to prepare a Thanksgiving turkey.

== Southern Gals ==
An Ana Gasteyer, Cheri Oteri and Molly Shannon sketch. Debuted November 15, 1997. Gasteyer, Oteri, Shannon, and the episode's host would play a quartet of Southern belles who would travel around the world and make superfluous observations about where they're traveling.

== The View ==
A parody of the morning talk show The View. The first sketch debuted on November 15, 1997. The View hosts change according to the actual panel at that time. In the first few sketches, the cast includes Meredith Vieira (Molly Shannon), Barbara Walters (Cheri Oteri), Star Jones (Tracy Morgan in drag), and Cokie Roberts (Ana Gasteyer). The fifth host, Debbie Matenopoulos, was played by the guest host or Gasteyer. Early sketches poked fun at the women’s disdain for Matenopoulos. In season 24, Matenopoulos herself cameos and tells off her co-hosts.

Appearances

| Season | Episode | Host | Notes |
|---|---|---|---|
| 23 | November 15, 1997 | Claire Danes | Claire Danes as Debbie Matenopoulos; Ana Gasteyer as Cokie Roberts; Molly Shannon as Meredith Vieira; Tracy Morgan as Star Jones; Cheri Oteri as Barbara Walters |
| 23 | January 17, 1998 | Sarah Michelle Gellar | Sarah Michelle Gellar as Debbie Matenopoulos; Ana Gasteyer as Cokie Roberts; Molly Shannon as Meredith Vieira; Tracy Morgan as Star Jones; Cheri Oteri as Barbara Walters |
| 23 | May 2, 1998 | Matthew Broderick | Ana Gasteyer as Debbie Matenopoulos; Molly Shannon as Meredith Vieira; Tracy Morgan as Star Jones; Cheri Oteri as Barbara Walters |
| 24 | September 26, 1998 | Cameron Diaz | Cameron Diaz as Debbie Matenopoulos; Ana Gasteyer as Joy Behar; Molly Shannon as Meredith Vieira; Tracy Morgan as Star Jones; Cheri Oteri as Barbara Walters |
| 24 | January 9, 1999 | Bill Paxton | Debbie Matenopoulos as herself; Ana Gasteyer as Joy Behar; Molly Shannon as Meredith Vieira; Tracy Morgan as Star Jones; Cheri Oteri as Barbara Walters |
| 34 | November 1, 2008 | Ben Affleck | Fred Armisen as Joy Behar; Kenan Thompson as Whoopi Goldberg; Kristen Wiig as Elisabeth Hasselbeck |
| 34 | January 17, 2009 | Rosario Dawson | Fred Armisen as Joy Behar; Kenan Thompson as Whoopi Goldberg; Kristen Wiig as Elisabeth Hasselbeck; Michaela Watkins as Barbara Walters |
| 34 | March 14, 2009 | Tracy Morgan | Tracy Morgan as Sherri Shepherd; Fred Armisen as Joy Behar; Kenan Thompson as Whoopi Goldberg; Kristen Wiig as Elisabeth Hasselbeck; Michaela Watkins as Barbara Walters |
| 35 | November 7, 2009 | Taylor Swift | Fred Armisen as Joy Behar; Kenan Thompson as Whoopi Goldberg; Kristen Wiig as Elisabeth Hasselbeck; Nasim Pedrad as Barbara Walters |
| 35 | February 6, 2010 | Ashton Kutcher | Fred Armisen as Joy Behar; Kenan Thompson as Whoopi Goldberg; Kristen Wiig as Elisabeth Hasselbeck; Nasim Pedrad as Barbara Walters |
| 36 | October 23, 2010 | Emma Stone | Fred Armisen as Joy Behar; Kenan Thompson as Whoopi Goldberg; Kristen Wiig as Elisabeth Hasselbeck; Nasim Pedrad as Barbara Walters |
| 44 | April 13, 2019 | Emma Stone | Aidy Bryant as Meghan McCain; Leslie Jones as Whoopi Goldberg; Kate McKinnon as Joy Behar; Cecily Strong as Abby Huntsman; Melissa Villaseñor as Ana Navarro |
| 44 | May 18, 2019 | Paul Rudd | Aidy Bryant as Meghan McCain; Leslie Jones Whoopi Goldberg; Kate McKinnon as Joy Behar; Cecily Strong as Abby Huntsman; Melissa Villaseñor as Ana Navarro |
| 48 | October 29, 2022 | Jack Harlow | Chloe Fineman as Sara Haines; Punkie Johnson as Sunny Hostin; Ego Nwodim as Whoopi Goldberg; Sarah Sherman as Joy Behar |

== Tiger Beat's Ultra Super Duper Dreamy Love Show ==
A Sarah Michelle Gellar, Ana Gasteyer, Cheri Oteri and Molly Shannon sketch. Debuted January 15, 1998. It stars Gellar, Oteri, Shannon, and Gasteyer as four gossipy teens: un-prepared Susie "Jessica" Dibbins, freckle-faced Sarah Margaret Connolly, easily-angered Sissy Germane Daphne and bracefaced Gladys Stubbs, respectively. Funded by Tiger Beat magazine, the four of them gossip about celebs from the time and (in the second sketch only) have them on the show. The first sketch is also notorious for having an elderly character played by Norm Macdonald's mustache slowly peel off, which he saves with a clever ad-lib ("This is not a real mustache!") and a story about where he got it.

A similar sketch exists on All That in "What-Everrrr!", which has Amanda Bynes and Christy Knowings as teens Gina and Jessica.

== Gunner Olsen ==
Played by Jim Breuer, Olsen recapped the night's news in the style of a lead singer in a heavy metal band. Debuted March 7, 1998.

== The Céline Dion Show ==
The Celine Dion Show was a faux variety show in which Ana Gasteyer played the Grammy award-winning singer, who in the opening credits claims to be "the most beautiful and most loved singer in the world". The sketch was inspired by Dion's success in the wake of her number one Billboard Hot 100 hit "My Heart Will Go On" in 1998.

In the sketches, Celine would usually begin with a solo, adding exaggerated vocal gymnastics and runs to even the simplest of songs. Then, she would usually invite a musical guest to perform. However, soon into their performance, Celine would feel upstaged, and would start singing over top of them in a much louder voice, much to their displeasure. Debuted March 7, 1998.

The sketch attracted the attention of the real singer herself, who invited Gasteyer to perform the character in one of her concerts in 1998.

Appearances

| Season | Episode | Host | Notes |
|---|---|---|---|
| 23 | March 7, 1998 | Scott Wolf | Celine talks with Erykah Badu (Tim Meadows) and Mariah Carey (Cheri Oteri). |
| 23 | May 2, 1998 | Matthew Broderick | Celine talks with Gloria Estefan (Broderick), Shania Twain (Molly Shannon), and Mariah Carey (Cheri Oteri) |
| 24 | November 21, 1998 | Jennifer Love Hewitt | Celine pitches an album called More Duets that Prove that I Am the Best Singer in the World!, dueting with Jewel (Hewitt), Michael Stipe (Jimmy Fallon), Busta Rhymes (Tim Meadows), and Meat Loaf (Horatio Sanz) |
| 25 | November 13, 1999 | Garth Brooks | Celine sings the theme song for an NBC epic miniseries based on The Smurfs |
| 25 | December 4, 1999 | Christina Ricci | And So This Is Chanukah |
| 26 | February 10, 2001 | Jennifer Lopez | Appears with Lopez, Mango (Chris Kattan), Shania Twain (Molly Shannon), Aretha Franklin (Tracy Morgan), and Diana Ross (Maya Rudolph) at a VH1 Divas concert |
| 27 | April 6, 2002 | Cameron Diaz | Celine Dion on CBS |

== GoLords ==
A stop-motion animated parody of Thunderbirds and Supercar. The segments were written by Harper Steele.

== Pretty Living ==
Ana Gasteyer played the host of a TV show called Pretty Living. Each episode featured Molly Shannon as Helen Madden, an exuberant self-proclaimed "Joyologist" whose trademark phrase was "I love, I love it!" while kicking her legs and crossing and uncrossing her legs repeatedly. Helen Madden also appeared in an earlier 1996 sketch called "Single and Loving it" with Cheri Oteri. Debuted March 14, 1998.

== Terrence Maddox, Nude Model ==
A Will Ferrell sketch. Debuted March 14, 1998.

| Preceded by Recurring Saturday Night Live characters and sketches introduced 1996–97 | Recurring Saturday Night Live characters and sketches (listed chronologically) | Succeeded by Recurring Saturday Night Live characters and sketches introduced 1998–99 |
