= Saturday Night Live season 29 =

Saturday Night Live
- Season 29
- No. of episodes: 20

Release
- Original network: NBC
- Original release: October 4, 2003 – May 15, 2004

Season chronology
- ← Previous season 28 Next → season 30

The twenty-ninth season of Saturday Night Live, an American sketch comedy series, originally aired in the United States on NBC between October 4, 2003, and May 15, 2004.

== History ==
This season marked the debut of a brand new stage for the host's monologue and the musical guest performing stage. Instead of the wrought-iron fire escape motif with the blinking "ON AIR" light, the stages are now modeled after Grand Central Terminal (right down to the spherical clock).

== Cast ==
Before the start of the season, longtime cast members Chris Kattan and Tracy Morgan, who had both been on the show since 1996, departed the show on their own terms, and featured player Dean Edwards, who had been on the show the past two seasons, was let go following the finale. Despite their departures, Kattan and Morgan would make guest appearances in several episodes throughout the season and Morgan would later host in 2009 and 2015.

Will Forte, Seth Meyers, and Jeff Richards were all promoted to repertory status, while Fred Armisen remained a featured player.

The show added two new African-American cast members: stand-up comedian Finesse Mitchell and Kenan Thompson, a former child star from the Nickelodeon comedy shows All That and Kenan & Kel. Thompson became the first SNL cast member to be born after the show's premiere in 1975 (Thompson was born in 1978) and would eventually become the longest-tenured cast member in the show’s history as of 2026.

This was the final season for longtime cast member Jimmy Fallon, who had been on the show for six seasons since 1998, and Richards, who departed mid-season after three seasons on the show since 2001. In an interview at the time, Richards said he left to branch out into other projects, though he later mentioned that his substance abuse was a factor.

=== Cast roster ===
**Repertory players**

- Rachel Dratch
- **Jimmy Fallon**
- **Tina Fey**
- Will Forte
- Darrell Hammond
- Seth Meyers
- Chris Parnell
- Amy Poehler
- Jeff Richards (final episode: January 17, 2004)
- Maya Rudolph
- Horatio Sanz

**Featured players**

- Fred Armisen
- Finesse Mitchell
- Kenan Thompson

bold denotes "Weekend Update" anchor

== Writers ==
Future cast member Jason Sudeikis and stand-up comedian J. B. Smoove were hired as writers this season.

John Lutz and Liz Cackowski are hired midway through the season, starting with the Megan Mullally-hosted episode.

This was the final season for longtime writers Michael Schur (who had been a writer for 6½ years since 1998) and Dennis McNicholas (who had been a writer for nine years since 1995; and became head writer 3½ years earlier in 2001).

McNicholas returned to SNL to produce Weekend Update, 10 years later in 2014.

== Episodes ==
No. overall	No. in season	Host(s)	Musical guest(s)	Original release date
546	1	Jack Black	John Mayer	October 4, 2003
John Mayer performs "Bigger than My Body" and "Clarity".; Kyle Gass, Allie DiMeco, Tyler James Williams and Will Ferrell make cameo appearances in the monologue.; Finesse Mitchell and Kenan Thompson's first episode as cast members.
547	2	Justin Timberlake	Justin Timberlake	October 11, 2003
Justin Timberlake performs "Rock Your Body", "Señorita" and "Cry Me a River".; First appearance of The Barry Gibb Talk Show sketch.; Steve Higgins appears in the opening monologue and introduces Timberlake's first musical performance.; Jimmy Fallon introduces Timberlake's second musical performance.; Maya Rudolph introduces Timberlake's third musical performance.; Carl Weathers cameos in a short sketch announcing his candidacy as governor of any state, parodying his Predator co-stars Jesse Ventura and Arnold Schwarzenegger's successful campaign for governor, as well as the numerous celebrities running for governor in the 2003 California recall election.
548	3	Halle Berry	Britney Spears	October 18, 2003
Britney Spears performs "Me Against the Music" and "Everytime" and appears in the opening monologue.; George Wendt makes an appearance to reprise his character on Weekend Update as Bob Swerski.
549	4	Kelly Ripa	Outkast	November 1, 2003
OutKast performs "Hey Ya!" and "The Way You Move".; Darrell Hammond takes over as George W. Bush, replacing Chris Parnell.; Chris Kattan returns to appear as Michael Gelman in the Live with Regis and Kelly sketch.; Writer and future cast member Jason Sudeikis makes an on-air appearance in the monologue. Writers Paula Pell, J.B. Smoove, and Jim Downey also appear in the monologue.; Although he appears in the opening credits, Kenan Thompson does not appear in this episode.
550	5	Andy Roddick	Dave Matthews	November 8, 2003
Dave Matthews perform "Save Me" and "So Damn Lucky".; John McEnroe makes multiple appearances in this episode including the monologue, the Billie Jean King sketch and Jock Talk. He also cameos in a short piece after the "British Nanny" sketch where he and Chris Parnell play tennis commentators analyzing Roddick's hosting.; Finesse Mitchell appears during the opening monologue as André 3000 of OutKast and explains he never left after the wrap party from the previous week's show.
551	6	Alec Baldwin	Missy Elliott	November 15, 2003
Missy Elliott performs "Pass That Dutch" and "Work It".; Former cast member Mike Myers appears in the monologue to plug the film The Cat in the Hat, which co-starred Alec Baldwin.
552	7	Al Sharpton	Pink	December 6, 2003
Pink performs "Trouble" and "God Is a DJ".; Paris Hilton appears on Weekend Update.; Former cast member Tracy Morgan appears in the monologue as the young Al Sharpton, in a sketch about the three wise men getting pulled over, in a reprise of his recurring segment, Brian Fellow's Safari Planet, with Sharpton as Fellow's brother, and in a sketch about racial stereotypes in a 1930s film.; Johnnie Cochran appears in the audience during the "Michael Jackson on a Roller Coaster" sketch.
553	8	Elijah Wood	Jet	December 13, 2003
Jet performs "Are You Gonna Be My Girl" and "Look What You've Done".; Chris Kattan appears in the monologue as Gollum and reprises his role as Buddy Mills in Rialto Grande.
554	9	Jennifer Aniston	The Black Eyed Peas	January 10, 2004
The Black Eyed Peas perform "Where is the Love?" and "Hey Mama".; Former writer and cast member Al Franken appears in a filmed cameo during Weekend Update.
555	10	Jessica Simpson; Nick Lachey	G-Unit	January 17, 2004
G Unit performs "Stunt 101" and "Wanna Get to Know You," the latter featuring a cameo by R&B singer Joe.; Jeff Richards' final episode as a cast member.
556	11	Megan Mullally	Clay Aiken	February 7, 2004
Clay Aiken performs "Invisible" and "The Way" and also appears as himself in the monologue and in the last sketch as a fictional relative named Tray Aiken.; Mullally's husband, Nick Offerman, makes a cameo appearance during the Golden Globes sketch.; Announcer Don Pardo mistakenly reads Chris Kattan's name over cast member Chris Parnell's graphic during the opening titles.
557	12	Drew Barrymore	Kelis	February 14, 2004
Kelis performs "Milkshake" and "Trick Me".; Will Forte plays George W. Bush for the first time, replacing Darrell Hammond.; Writer Scott Wainio appears in a brief filmed sketch where he interviews people without using a microphone.
558	13	Christina Aguilera	Maroon 5	February 21, 2004
Maroon 5 performs "This Love" and "Harder to Breathe".; Lorne Michaels appears during the monologue.
559	14	Colin Firth	Norah Jones	March 6, 2004
Norah Jones performs "Sunrise" and "What Am I to You?".; Ana Gasteyer makes a cameo appearance in the cold opening as Martha Stewart.
560	15	Ben Affleck	N*E*R*D	March 13, 2004
N.E.R.D. performs "She Wants to Move" and "Maybe".; Kelly Ripa appears in a filmed commercial parody about tourism in Bangkok.
561	16	Donald Trump	Toots & the Maytals featuring Ben Harper, Jack Johnson, Bootsy Collins, and The Roots	April 3, 2004
Toots & the Maytals perform "Love Gonna Walk Out on Me" with Ben Harper and Jack Johnson and "Funky Kingston" with The Roots and Bootsy Collins.; Future cast member Rob Riggle appears as an extra in a filmed commercial parody for "Fear Factor, Jr".; Carolyn Kepcher and George H. Ross (from The Apprentice) make cameo appearances in the cold opening, as does SNL producer Lorne Michaels.; Although he appears in the opening credits, Will Forte does not appear in this episode.; According to a People Magazine article from September 2025, Frankie Muniz was originally asked to host this episode.
562	17	Janet Jackson	Janet Jackson	April 10, 2004
Janet Jackson performs "All Nite (Don't Stop)" and "Strawberry Bounce".; Chris Kattan and Tracy Morgan both cameo in a Season's Greetings from SNL musical number. Morgan also reprises his role as Brian Fellow, appears in the Good Times sketch and introduces Janet Jackson's first performance. Kattan also introduces Jackson's second performance.; Simon Cowell also cameos in the Season's Greetings sketch to criticize them before joining in himself. Simon was actually asked to host the show, but would only agree to do a guest appearance.
563	18	Lindsay Lohan	Usher	May 1, 2004
Usher performs "Yeah!" and "Burn". The former song features a cameo appearance by Ludacris.; Rachel Dratch makes her first appearance as Debbie Downer.
564	19	Snoop Dogg	Avril Lavigne	May 8, 2004
Avril Lavigne performs "Don't Tell Me" and "My Happy Ending".
565	20	Mary-Kate and Ashley Olsen	J-Kwon	May 15, 2004
J-Kwon performs "Tipsy".; This episode features a short film about a bald boy named Harold, which was the basis for a film featuring the character.; Announcer Don Pardo appears in the Bloater Brother segment.; Because the show was running long, J-Kwon's second song was cut in order to make room for Jimmy Fallon's farewell sketch.; Jimmy Fallon's final episode as a cast member and as Weekend Update co-anchor.

== Specials ==
Title	Original release date
"The Best of Chris Kattan"	September 27, 2003
Sketches included "The Roxbury Guys," "Mango," "Defense Attorney Suel," "The How Do You Say? Ah Yes, Show," "Mr. Peppers in the Lab," "Auditions for Bon Jovi," "America Undercover," "The Rialto Grande," "Goth Talk," "Sparks," "Oprah," "Larry King's Wedding Reception," "E! Impeachment Coverage," "Loaded-Musical Performance," "Emmy Awards Pre-Show," "Shopping at Home Network," "Siamese Twin Dates," and some "Weekend Update" clips.
"The Best of Tracy Morgan"	October 25, 2003
Sketches include "Wong & Owen, Ex-Porn Stars," "Brian Fellow's Safari Planet," "Pimp Chat," "Woodrow," "The View," "Uncle Jemima's Down House Mash Liquor," "Tracy Confronts Garth," "Astronaut Jones," "Talkin' to the Stars," "Hardball," "Big Bernard," "At the Movies," "Christmas Eve Drinks," "Channel 5 Late Night Movie," and a Weekend Update clips.
"The Best of Will Ferrell, Volume 2"	December 20, 2003
A second compilation of sketches featuring Will Ferrell.
"The Best of Christopher Walken"	May 22, 2004
Sketches include "The Continental" (on the TV airing, the "Continental" sketch that aired was the one from season 18; the DVD version also includes the one from season 25 and a dress rehearsal version of the one from season 28 shown picture-in-picture style under the title, "The Making of The Continental"), "Ed Glosser Trivial Psychic", "Rita Snowed In", "Behind the Music: Blue Oyster Cult", "Leon Loves Mango", "Hardball", "Pranksters", "The Bad Raft Captain" (DVD version only), "Colonel Angus" and "Christopher Walken at the 25th Anniversary Special". The DVD version includes two dress rehearsal sketches: "The Black Guardian Angel" (from season 25) and a movie trailer parody called Fonzie (from season 26).
