= T. Sean Shannon =

American film director

- Born: Kentucky
- Education: University of Houston
- Occupation(s): Writer, film director

T. Sean Shannon is an American comedian, writer and film director from Houston, Texas. His brother Charles Shannon (d. 2003) was also a stand-up comedian, and writer.

As a writer for Saturday Night Live he won an Emmy Award in 2002 (nominated in 2001 & 2003) and a WGA Award in 2001 (nominated in 2001, 2002 and 2003). He is the writer and creator of the sketch Bear City, which deals with a city completely inhabited by anthropomorphic bears due to a meteor crash. In July 2008, Shannon revealed that he had written a Bear City movie.

He was also the subject of controversy and political unrest at SNL, thanks to a joke he told in The Aristocrats. Penn Jillette mentions this incident in the commentary for the film, but does not mention the show, instead stating that T. Sean works for a popular network comedy show.

Shannon was a writer on the show from 1998 to 2006.

He directed and co-wrote the feature film Harold that was released in July 2008.

Shannon moved back to the Houston area in early 2025 after living in New York City for 8 years.
