= Saturday Night Live season 23 =

Saturday Night Live
- Season 23
- No. of episodes: 20

Release
- Original network: NBC
- Original release: September 27, 1997 – May 9, 1998

Season chronology
- ← Previous season 22 Next → season 24

The twenty-third season of Saturday Night Live, an American sketch comedy series, originally aired in the United States on NBC between September 27, 1997, and May 9, 1998.

This season saw the deaths of two former cast members. Six weeks after hosting the October 25 episode, Chris Farley died of a speedball overdose at the age of 33. Two weeks after the season finale, long-time performer Phil Hartman was murdered by his wife who then committed suicide. Following their deaths, NBC aired two SNL specials as tributes to Farley and Hartman in dedication to their respective legacies.

== Cast ==
Before the season, Mark McKinney left the show after 2½ seasons. Colin Quinn was promoted to repertory status. This season is one of the few to not include any featured players or new cast members.

During the season, a controversy arose in which Don Ohlmeyer (NBC West Coast president) made the decision to remove Norm Macdonald from his position as Weekend Update anchor. Ohlmeyer claimed the decision was made because of ratings going down during the segment, though MacDonald and others believed the decision was a result of jokes in the segment about O.J. Simpson, a friend of Ohlmeyer. Macdonald's final episode as Update anchor was on December 13, 1997. Quinn was then promoted to the job and anchored the segment in the next live episode, which aired January 10, 1998. Macdonald performed in sketches, but was angry about the change-up and ultimately quit the show; his final appearance was on March 14, 1998, after five seasons on the show since 1993.

This was also the final season for Jim Breuer as he left the show at season's end after three seasons to move on to other acting opportunities.

=== Cast roster ===
Repertory players

- Jim Breuer
- Will Ferrell
- Ana Gasteyer
- Darrell Hammond
- Chris Kattan
- **Norm Macdonald** (final episode: March 14, 1998)
- Tim Meadows
- Tracy Morgan
- Cheri Oteri
- **Colin Quinn**
- Molly Shannon

bold denotes Weekend Update anchor

== Writers ==
Future cast member/head writer Tina Fey joins the writing staff in this season.

Adam McKay continues as the sole head writer, while Tim Herlihy is promoted to a producer alongside Steve Higgins.

Fellow regular writer Paula Pell is named as a creative consultant (nowadays a writing supervisor) this season.

With the Sarah Michelle Gellar-hosted episode, future Parks and Recreation/The Good Place creator Michael Schur joined the writing staff. Decades later, Schur explained that he initially applied for the job at the start of the season, but Fey was hired over him, and that he was hired over the show's winter break.

Longtime writer Jim Downey was fired. NBC West Coast president Don Ohlmeyer had grown irritated by the constant jokes regarding his friend, former football star, OJ Simpson. Downey was the primary source for the many jokes Norm Macdonald made at the expense of Simpson. After Downey was fired, Macdonald was informed he could no longer serve as Weekend Update host. Macdonald decided to leave following this revelation. Downey is still credited as a writer until the end of the season, and would return to the writing staff in 2000.

== Episodes ==
No. overall	No. in season	Host	Musical guest(s)	Original release date
427	1	Sylvester Stallone	Jamiroquai	September 27, 1997
Jamiroquai performs "Alright".; The initial 1996 Olympics bombing suspect Richard Jewell makes a guest appearance, where, in a highly publicized sketch, he punches Janet Reno (played by Will Ferrell) in the gut, with Reno responding, "Same time next week?" Jewell also appeared alongside Norm Macdonald on Weekend Update.
428	2	Matthew Perry	Oasis	October 4, 1997
Oasis performs "Don't Go Away" and "Acquiesce".; This episode marked the first appearance of Tim Meadows' popular "The Ladies Man" sketch.
429	3	Brendan Fraser	Björk	October 18, 1997
Björk performs "Bachelorette".; Eric Dickerson made a guest appearance in the Monday Night Football sketch.; This episode marked the first appearance of Chris Kattan's Mango character.
430	4	Chris Farley	The Mighty Mighty Bosstones	October 25, 1997
The Mighty Mighty Bosstones perform "The Impression That I Get".; Chevy Chase and Chris Rock have cameo appearances in the cold opening and the monologue.; The first Morning Latte sketch appears in this episode.; Ana Gasteyer debuts her recurring sketch Martha Stewart Living.; Saturday Night Live Band member Lenny Pickett appears in the Boseephus sketch.; Chicago news anchor and reporter Bill Kurtis along with George Wendt, Robert Smigel, and Mike Ditka appear in a short film showing the lives of the "Bill Swerski's Superfans" after their run on SNL.; Chris Farley reprises his characters Matt Foley and Todd O'Connor.; This episode contains the first sketch Tina Fey got on the air.; This was Farley's final television appearance before his death on December 18, 1997.
431	5	Jon Lovitz	Jane's Addiction	November 8, 1997
Jane's Addiction performs "Jane Says" with Flea.; Former cast member Dana Carvey makes a cameo appearance in this episode as Ross Perot in the "Wedding Reception" sketch and as George Michael in the "Set Our Nanny Free!" commercial.
432	6	Claire Danes	Mariah Carey	November 15, 1997
Mariah Carey performs "Butterfly" and "My All".; During the monologue, show writer and future cast member Tina Fey makes a brief appearance as an audience member.
433	7	Rudolph Giuliani	Sarah McLachlan	November 22, 1997
Sarah McLachlan performs "Sweet Surrender". She also appeared in the Weekend Update segment.
434	8	Nathan Lane	Metallica	December 6, 1997
Metallica performs "Fuel" and "The Memory Remains", the latter featuring Marianne Faithfull on vocals.; Lane's The Lion King co-star, Ernie Sabella, makes a cameo appearance during the monologue, in which both sing a few bars of "Hakuna Matata".; The Dallas Cowboy Cheerleaders make a guest appearance in the "Spartans Dream" sketch.
435	9	Helen Hunt	Hanson	December 13, 1997
Hanson performs "MMMBop" and "Merry Christmas Baby". They also appeared in the "MMMBop Elevator Hostages" sketch.; Hunt's As Good as It Gets co-star Jack Nicholson makes a cameo appearance during the monologue and in a "Roxbury Guys" sketch.; Pedro Borbón Jr., Marty Cordova, Russ Davis, Jeff Fassero, Cliff Floyd, Mark Grudzielanek, David Howard, Todd Hundley, Gregg Jefferies, Scott Rolen, Mike Sweeney, Rondell White, Gerald Williams, Mark Wohlers and Todd Zeile make an appearance in the "Baseball Dreams" sketch.; Norm Macdonald's final episode as Weekend Update anchor.
436	10	Samuel L. Jackson	Ben Folds Five	January 10, 1998
Ben Folds Five performs "Brick".; Colin Quinn's first episode as Weekend Update anchor.
437	11	Sarah Michelle Gellar	Portishead	January 17, 1998
Portishead performs "Only You".
438	12	John Goodman	Paula Cole	February 7, 1998
Paula Cole performs "I Don't Want to Wait".; Dan Aykroyd cameos in this episode, reprising two of his popular recurring characters, Elwood Blues from The Blues Brothers during the monologue and Irwin Mainway from "Consumer Probe" in the Judge Judy sketch. He also impersonates Bob Dole in the cold opening.; Aykroyd and Goodman perform "Lookin' For a Fox" with the Blues Brothers Band.
439	13	Roma Downey	Missy Misdemeanor Elliott	February 14, 1998
Missy Elliott performs "Sock It 2 Me" and "Beep Me 911". She is joined during the performance by Timbaland & Magoo.
440	14	Garth Brooks	Garth Brooks	February 28, 1998
Garth Brooks performs "Two Piña Coladas".; Robert Duvall makes a guest appearance in the "Who's More Grizzled?!" sketch and the "Lay Lady Lay" sketch as well as introducing Brooks' musical performance.
441	15	Scott Wolf	Natalie Imbruglia	March 7, 1998
Natalie Imbruglia performs "Torn".; In the cold open, show writer and future cast member Tina Fey appears as Kathleen Willey on Larry King Live.; This episode is referenced in Jordan Peele's movie Nope when Yeun describes a childhood tragedy that was parodied in the fictitious "Bad Gordy" sketch.
442	16	Julianne Moore	Backstreet Boys	March 14, 1998
Backstreet Boys perform "As Long as You Love Me".; Norm Macdonald's final episode as a cast member.
443	17	Steve Buscemi	Third Eye Blind	April 4, 1998
Third Eye Blind performs "How's It Going to Be".; Lewis H. Lapham cameos in the cold open.; Writer Tina Fey appears in the monologue.; John Hurt made a guest appearance as the Hare in the "Mad Tea Party" sketch.; Didi Conn appears in the "Morning Latte" sketch.; Natasha Henstridge appears in the "Job Interview" sketch.; Jason Alexander, Whoopi Goldberg, Gilbert Gottfried and Molly Ringwald lend their voices in the animated TV Funhouse segment.
444	18	Greg Kinnear	All Saints	April 11, 1998
All Saints perform "Never Ever".; Bob Hoskins made two guest appearances in the "Walk the Plank" sketch and the "Former Hosts of Later Reunion" commercial.; The TV Funhouse "Fun with Real Audio" cartoon – about Tom Snyder's being obsessed with Dolly Parton – was written by Robert Smigel, Smigel's wife Michelle and Stephen Colbert.
445	19	Matthew Broderick	Natalie Merchant	May 2, 1998
Natalie Merchant performs "Kind & Generous".; Tenacious D appears as a special guest, performing "The History of Tenacious D" and "Double Team".; Regis Philbin appeared in the pre-filmed "Viagra" commercial.
446	20	David Duchovny	Puff Daddy & Jimmy Page	May 9, 1998
Puff Daddy and Jimmy Page perform "Come with Me".; Duchovny's The X-Files co-star Nicholas Lea made a cameo appearance in the cold open.; Paula Abdul made a guest appearance in the “Cheerleading Camp” sketch.; John Goodman, Matt Lauer and Al Roker appeared in the "Mango" sketch.; Jim Breuer's final episode as a cast member.

== Specials ==
#	Special	Original airdate
1	"SNL Halloween '97"	November 1, 1997
A clip show hosted by Mike Myers and Dana Carvey featuring material from previous shows.
2	"SNL Sports Extra '98"	January 24, 1998
A clip show featuring material from previous shows.
3	"Best of the New Season '97–'98"	January 31, 1998
A clip show featuring some of the best material from the first half of the '97–'98 season. Sketches include "Well Babies Tragedy," "Cookie Dough Sport," "The View," "The Ladies' Man," and "The Ambiguously Gay Duo".
4	"SNL Remembers Chris Farley"	February 21, 1998
The special, introduced by Tim Meadows, featured some of the best material featuring Chris Farley during his stint on the show. Sketches include "Chippendales Auditions," "Superfans," "The Chris Farley Show," "Bobby Watches Grandma," "Schmitts Gay," "Focus on Beauty II," "Matt Foley, Motivational Speaker," "Giuliani's Inauguration," "Tater Junction," "Lunchlady Land", "Lillehammer", "Clinton Auditions," "Good Morning Brooklyn," "Japanese Game Show," "Juggernaut Force," "Zagat's," and "Hidden Camera Commercials".
5	"SNL Remembers Phil Hartman"	June 13, 1998
The special featured some of the best material featuring Phil Hartman during his stint on the show. Sketches include "Donahue," "The Crosby Show," "Star Trek Convention," "Discover," "On Broadway," "Church Chat," "Cumpulsion," "Anne Boleyn," "Succinctly Speaking," "All-Drug Olympics," "Nicknames," "Win, Lose, or Tie," "Love is a Dream (film)," "Nancy Reagan Visits," "Robot Repair," "Cooking with the Anal Retentive Chef," "A Betty Ford Straight Arrow Christmas," "Celebrity Lawyer Court," "Greenhilly," "The Sinatra Group," "Clarence Thomas Hearings," "Campaign '92," "Sprockets," "Dick Clark's Snotty Receptionist," "Unfrozen Caveman Lawyer," "Johnny Carson's Last Episode," "Perot and Stockdale Car Trip," "Clinton at McDonald's," "Sassy's Sassiest Boys," and "Acting Class".
6	"The Best of Eddie Murphy"	August 22, 1998
The special featured some of the best material featuring Eddie Murphy during his tenure on the show. Sketches include "The Little Richard Simmons Show," "Prose and Cons" (film), "Velvet Jones School of Technology," "Career Corner," "Ebony & Ivory," "Buckwheat Dead," "Stevie Wonder Impersonator," "Rock & Roll... and then some," "Black History Minute," "Mr. Robinson's Neighborhood," "Gumby," "Buckwheat Sings," and "James Brown's Hot Tub Party".
