= Saturday Night Live season 25 =

Saturday Night Live
- Season 25
- No. of episodes: 20

Release
- Original network: NBC
- Original release: October 2, 1999 – May 20, 2000

Season chronology
- ← Previous season 24 Next → season 26

The twenty-fifth season of Saturday Night Live (also branded Saturday Night Live 25 and SNL25), an American sketch comedy series, originally aired in the United States on NBC between October 2, 1999, and May 20, 2000.

== Cast ==
There were no changes to the cast prior to the start of this season, as everyone from the previous season returned. Jimmy Fallon, Horatio Sanz, and Chris Parnell were all promoted to repertory status. The show then added two new featured players as this season progressed: Rachel Dratch, a performer with The Second City in Chicago, and Maya Rudolph of The Groundlings.

In July 1999, when executive producer Lorne Michaels held auditions for the season, NBC introduced a new contract for first-year cast members, replacing the five- or six-year deals they had used in the past. The terms were established by NBC executives Scott Sassa and Garth Ancier. According to Peter Bogdanovich, the new contract came with the following terms:

"SNL, they are the not-ready-for-prime-time players. These are people who are just starting out. I challenge you to name a network, much less a show, that has created this many stars, ever ... All we're asking is, somebody who comes in and is, basically, virtually unknown and young has an opportunity to be on a very, very powerful sketch-comedy show and to be able to launch a film career and be in sitcoms. I think that's a pretty great opportunity."

— Scott Sassa, NBC's West Coast president, at the network's summer press presentation in Pasadena, California
- NBC can take a Saturday Night Live cast member off the show any time after their second year on the program and put them in an NBC sitcom.
- A cast member has the option of saying no to the first two shows proposed by NBC, but must accept the third deal.
- NBC dictates the length of the sitcom contract, which can run as long as six years.
- SNL Films, co-owned by Paramount Pictures, NBC and Lorne Michaels, has a three-movie option that would pay the star a set $75,000 for the first film, $150,000 for the second and $300,000 for the third, rates that used to be negotiable.
- NBC has the option of paying those same amounts to force a cast member to say no to a film deal offered to them by another studio.

The starting salary remained $5,000 per episode.

This would be the final season for longtime cast members Tim Meadows, Cheri Oteri, and Colin Quinn. Meadows had been on the show for 10 seasons since 1991 (a record at the time); while Oteri and Quinn had both been on for five seasons since 1995.

=== Cast roster ===
**Repertory players**

- Jimmy Fallon
- Will Ferrell
- Ana Gasteyer
- Darrell Hammond
- Chris Kattan
- Tim Meadows
- Tracy Morgan
- Cheri Oteri
- Chris Parnell
- **Colin Quinn**
- Horatio Sanz
- Molly Shannon

**Featured players**

- Rachel Dratch (first episode: October 23, 1999)
- Maya Rudolph (first episode: May 6, 2000)

bold denotes Weekend Update anchor

== Writers ==
Starting this season, Tina Fey is credited as the writing supervisor, which means that she was promoted to the head writer position, making her the first woman in this role.

However, previous head writer Adam McKay (who by this point, had been a writer since 1995) returned to the writing staff this season.

The Jennifer Aniston episode would mark the final episode for longtime writer/producer Tim Herlihy (a writer for the show since 1994), as he left the show after 5½ years.

== Episodes ==
No. overall	No. in season	Host	Musical guest(s)	Original release date
466	1	Jerry Seinfeld	David Bowie	October 2, 1999
David Bowie performs "Thursday's Child" and "Rebel, Rebel".; Harold Perrineau, J. K. Simmons, Lee Tergesen and Dean Winters appeared as their characters from the HBO prison drama Oz in a pre-taped sketch that has Jerry Seinfeld sent to the Oswald Correctional Facility following his jail time on the series finale of Seinfeld.; During the Point-Counterpoint between Jerry Seinfeld and Jerry Seinfeld (Jimmy Fallon), the real Jerry turns to Fallon's Jerry and says "Jerry, you ignorant slut," a reference to Point-Counterpoint in the '70s between Jane Curtin and Dan Aykroyd, where Dan would say "Jane, you ignorant slut."; AJ Benza appeared in the "... And a Pizza Place" sketch. NBC Late Night executive Rick Ludwin also briefly appears in this sketch.
467	2	Heather Graham	Marc Anthony	October 16, 1999
Marc Anthony performs "I Need to Know" and "That's Okay".; Former cast members Dana Carvey and Kevin Nealon appeared as Hans and Franz in a pre-taped parody of VH1's Where Are They Now?
468	3	Norm Macdonald	Dr. Dre featuring Snoop Dogg & Eminem	October 23, 1999
Dr. Dre and Snoop Dogg performs "Still D.R.E." for the first performance. Dr. Dre and Eminem performs "Forgot About Dre" for the second performance.; Rachel Dratch's first episode as a cast member.
469	4	Dylan McDermott	Foo Fighters	November 6, 1999
Foo Fighters performs "Learn to Fly" and "Stacked Actors".
470	5	Garth Brooks	Garth Brooks as Chris Gaines	November 13, 1999
Chris Gaines performs "Way of the Girl".; In a callback to Brooks' appearance when he hosted in season 23, Brooks, as Chris Gaines, does a sketch with Mango then unmasks Gaines.; First appearance of The Boston Teens sketch
471	6	Jennifer Aniston	Sting	November 20, 1999
Sting performs "Brand New Day" and "Desert Rose". Cheb Mami performs with Sting on the latter song. He also appears in the "Pretty Living" skit.; Who Wants to Be a Millionaire? winner John Carpenter appeared in the cold opening.; Writing supervisor and future cast member Tina Fey appeared during the monologue as an audience member who asks Aniston a question.
472	7	Christina Ricci	Beck	December 4, 1999
Beck performs "Mixed Bizness" and "Sexx Laws".; Madeline Kahn, a three-time SNL host, died the day before this episode aired. A tribute dedicated to her memory, which featured a sketch of her parodying her Young Frankenstein character during the first season, was shown before the goodnights.
473	8	Danny DeVito	R.E.M.	December 11, 1999
R.E.M. performs "The Great Beyond" and "Man on the Moon". As well, lead singer Michael Stipe makes an appearance in a "Mango" sketch with Chris Kattan.; Former cast member Al Franken and his son Joe appear during Weekend Update.; The Rockettes guest star in the "Rockettes Auditions" sketch featuring Molly Shannon's character Sally O'Malley.; Jim Carrey was the original host for this episode, but cancelled due to scheduling conflicts.
474	9	Jamie Foxx	Blink-182	January 8, 2000
Blink-182 performs "All the Small Things" and "What's My Age Again?"; John Goodman appears in a segment discussing his portrayal of Linda Tripp.; Jared "Choclatt" Crawford and Larry Wright performed with the Saturday Night Live Band.
475	10	Freddie Prinze Jr.	Macy Gray	January 15, 2000
Macy Gray performs "I Try" and "Why Didn't You Call Me".; Angie Everhart appeared in a sketch about Ugly Models.
476	11	Alan Cumming	Jennifer Lopez	February 5, 2000
Jennifer Lopez performs "Feelin' So Good" and "Waiting for Tonight".; Ben Stiller appeared in a filmed segment from Adam McKay.; Darrel Hammond announced the cast rather than Don Pardo.
477	12	Julianna Margulies	DMX	February 12, 2000
DMX performs "Party Up" and "What's My Name".; Margulies' ER co-star Noah Wyle appeared in a pre-taped segment during the monologue.
478	13	Ben Affleck	Fiona Apple	February 19, 2000
Fiona Apple performs "Limp".; Gwyneth Paltrow makes an appearance in Affleck's monologue (Affleck made an appearance in Paltrow's monologue when she hosted in 1999).; Paul Thomas Anderson directed the "Fanatic" pretaped sketch, where an orphan (Ben Affleck) meets Anna Nicole Smith (Molly Shannon).
479	14	Joshua Jackson	'N Sync	March 11, 2000
'N Sync performs "Bye, Bye, Bye" and "I Thought She Knew". They also appeared in the 7° Degrees Celsius sketch (Performing "Come On and Supersize It") as well as the "Parents Day" sketch.; The Statler Brothers appear in the "Parents Day" Sketch.; Badal Roy performs with the SNL Band.; SNL writer and stand up comic Kevin Brennan appeared as himself in a Weekend Update commentary on presidential candidates.; Includes the infamous sketch where Jimmy Fallon impersonated Chris Rock in blackface. Twenty years later, Fallon would apologize for that sketch in the June 1, 2020 episode of his show The Tonight Show Starring Jimmy Fallon during the opening monologue. The SNL app, Peacock streaming and NBC website version of this sketch cut the scene of Fallon as Chris Rock, but the uncut version appears on YouTube's SNL channel.
480	15	The Rock	AC/DC	March 18, 2000
AC/DC performs "Stiff Upper Lip" and "You Shook Me All Night Long".; Professional wrestlers Mick Foley, Triple H and The Big Show appear in the cold opening (alongside Vince McMahon), the monologue, Morning Latte, and the Nicotrel sketch where they (and The Rock) beat up Chris Parnell.
481	16	Christopher Walken	Christina Aguilera	April 8, 2000
Christina Aguilera performs "I Turn to You", "At Last", and "What A Girl Wants".; Former cast member Dana Carvey returns in this episode as George H. W. Bush during the cold opening.; This episode features the notable "More Cowbell" sketch.; Writing supervisor and future cast member Tina Fey appeared in the "Viagra" fake commercial as one of the unhappy wives.; J Mascis performs with the Saturday Night Live Band.
482	17	Tobey Maguire	Sisqó	April 15, 2000
Sisqó performs "Thong Song".; Steve Buscemi appeared in a short film from Adam McKay.
483	18	John Goodman	Neil Young	May 6, 2000
Neil Young performs "Razor Love" and "Silver & Gold". He also appears in the opening monologue.; Maya Rudolph's first episode as a cast member.; SNL writer and stand-up comic Kevin Brennan appeared as himself in a Weekend Update commentary on Elian Gonzalez.
484	19	Britney Spears	Britney Spears	May 13, 2000
Britney Spears performs "Oops!... I Did It Again" and "Don't Let Me Be the Last to Know".; Sarah Michelle Gellar appears in this episode to introduce Spears' first performance.; Cheri Oteri's mother appears while her daughter is introducing Spears' second performance.
485	20	Jackie Chan	Kid Rock	May 20, 2000
Kid Rock performs "American Bad Ass" and "Only God Knows Why" (with Phish guitarist Trey Anastasio). Kid Rock also appeared with Joe C. in the Elvis Impersonator sketch.; This is Joe C.'s last televised performance before his death on November 16 of that year.; Cameos by Sarah Michelle Gellar, Gina Gershon and Florence Henderson in the cold opening; Stuntman Brad Allan appeared as a thug in the opening monologue.; Former SNL bandleader G. E. Smith performed with the Saturday Night Live band.; Tim Meadows, Cheri Oteri and Colin Quinn's final episode as cast members.; Quinn's final episode as a Weekend Update anchor.; In its subsequent rerun, NBC would replace "The Zimmerman's" sketch with a pre-taped Adam McKay short film entitled "The Procedure" with Andy Richter and Willem Dafoe.; Stage manager Bob Van Ry and musical director Cheryl Hardwick retire effective with this show; both are mentioned by name in a sketch during the show.

== Specials ==
Title	Original release date
"25th Anniversary Special"	September 26, 1999
A special celebrating the 25th anniversary of the show. A long list of cast members, guest hosts and others stop by to honor the show's anniversary. Beastie Boys, Elvis Costello, Eurythmics and Al Green perform. John Belushi, Chris Farley, Phil Hartman, Michael O'Donoghue, Gilda Radner and Danitra Vance all received a tribute in the special. Dan Aykroyd, Alec Baldwin, James Van Der Beek, Drew Barrymore, Candice Bergen, Garth Brooks, David Bowie, Chevy Chase, Billy Crystal, Michael Douglas, James Downey, Nora Dunn, Al Franken, Sarah Michelle Gellar, John Goodman, Tom Hanks, Jan Hooks, Victoria Jackson, Catherine Zeta-Jones, Jon Lovitz, Norm Macdonald, Steve Martin, Lorne Michaels, Dennis Miller, Jay Mohr, Garrett Morris, Bill Murray, Mike Myers, Kevin Nealon, Laraine Newman, Don Pardo, Chris Rock, Adam Sandler, Jerry Seinfeld, Paul Shaffer, Martin Short, Paul Simon, Robert Smigel, Kevin Spacey, David Spade, Sting, Lily Tomlin, Steven Tyler, Christopher Walken and many more attended the event.
"Best of Game Show Parodies"	February 29, 2000
The special presented game show parodies featured on the show. Sketches include "Who Wants to Be a Millionaire?", "Celebrity Jeopardy", "Old French Whore", "Stand-Up and Win", "Who Wants to Eat?", "The Bensonhurst Dating Game", "Who Wants to Be Groped by an Eleven Thousand-aire?" The clip show was hosted by Will Ferrell as Alex Trebek and Darrell Hammond as Regis Philbin.
"The Best of Tim Meadows"	September 9, 2000
A compilation of some of Tim Meadows' sketches from his 10-year stint on the show.

== Superstar film ==
A Superstar film, based on the Mary Katherine Gallagher sketches, was released on October 8, 1999. Cast members Will Ferrell, Mark McKinney and Molly Shannon appear in the film. The film did modestly well at the box office but was panned by critics.
