= Saturday Night Live season 22 =

Saturday Night Live
- Season 22
- No. of episodes: 20

Release
- Original network: NBC
- Original release: September 28, 1996 – May 17, 1997

Season chronology
- ← Previous season 21 Next → season 23

The twenty-second season of Saturday Night Live, an American sketch comedy series, originally aired in the United States on NBC between September 28, 1996, and May 17, 1997.

This season is notable for the host selection. Seven of the 20 hosts were former cast members. They included Dana Carvey, Robert Downey Jr. (the second of three season 11 cast members to come back and host the show joining Damon Wayans [who hosted during the show's 20th season] and, later in season 23, Jon Lovitz), Phil Hartman, Chris Rock, Martin Short (who hosted before with Steve Martin and Chevy Chase on the show's 12th season, and the only cast member out of the seven to not have worked under Lorne Michaels, as Short was a Dick Ebersol cast member), Chase and Mike Myers. This would mark Chase's final time hosting before getting banned (returning much later for numerous guest appearances).

== Cast ==
Many changes happened before the start of the season. Nancy Walls was let go after one season, and longtime cast member David Spade, who had been with the cast for six seasons since 1990, left the show on his own terms. David Koechner was initially going to return but at the request of NBC West Coast president Don Ohlmeyer was let go after one season, despite pleas from creator Lorne Michaels to keep him.

Comedian and singer Ana Gasteyer of The Groundlings and stand-up comedian Tracy Morgan were hired to replace Koechner and Walls, being promoted to repertory status when hired.

Chris Kattan was promoted to repertory status, while Colin Quinn and Fred Wolf remained as featured players.

This was the final season for Mark McKinney, who had been on the show for three seasons since 1995. Wolf also left his position as featured player and co-head writer after the season's first three episodes.

=== Cast roster ===
**Repertory players**

- Jim Breuer
- Will Ferrell
- Ana Gasteyer
- Darrell Hammond
- Chris Kattan
- **Norm Macdonald**
- Mark McKinney
- Tim Meadows
- Tracy Morgan
- Cheri Oteri
- Molly Shannon

**Featured players**

- Colin Quinn
- Fred Wolf (only episode: October 19, 1996)

bold denotes Weekend Update anchor

Quinn was credited for 10 of the season's 20 episodes and Wolf was only credited for the third episode of the season and left afterwards. This is also the final season in which featured players are only credited in certain episodes. Starting with season 24, featured players are credited for every single episode of the season, whether they appear or not.

== Writers ==
Adam McKay, who had joined the writing staff at the start of the previous season, became head writer alongside Tim Herlihy. While Steve Higgins (who was also promoted to producer) and Fred Wolf remained on the writing staff. Robert Carlock and Stephen Colbert joined the writing staff for this season.

Additionally, former writer Robert Smigel (who previously wrote for the show from 1985 to 1993) returned to the writing staff to produce the "TV Funhouse" cartoons.

Wolf (who joined the writing staff in 1993) left the show after the Bill Pulman-hosted episode after about three calendar years.

This was Norm Hiscock's final season as a writer. Hiscock (joining the writing staff in 1994) departed from the series after three seasons. Hiscock was one of the few writers who survived the writer/cast overhaul after season 20 in 1995.

== Episodes ==
No. overall	No. in season	Host	Musical guest	Original release date
407	1	Tom Hanks	Tom Petty & the Heartbreakers	September 28, 1996
Tom Petty & the Heartbreakers perform "Walls (No. 3)" and an electric version of "Angel Dream (No. 2)"; Olympic athlete Kerri Strug makes a cameo appearance on Weekend Update alongside Chris Kattan.; Credited Featured Players: (none); This is the first appearance of Robert Smigel's "Saturday TV Funhouse" segment and the first installment of "The Ambiguously Gay Duo", which originally debuted on the sketch program "The Dana Carvey Show" earlier that year.; This is the first episode to feature Chris Kattan's character Mr. Peepers – the man/ape who shreds through apples.; Ana Gasteyer and Tracy Morgan's first episode as cast members.
408	2	Lisa Kudrow	Sheryl Crow	October 5, 1996
Credited Featured Player: Colin Quinn; Sheryl Crow performs "If It Makes You Happy" and "Love is a Good Thing".; David Lander makes a cameo appearance during the cold open as Squiggy.
409	3	Bill Pullman	New Edition	October 19, 1996
New Edition performs "Hit Me Off" and "I'm Still in Love with You".; Credited Featured Player: Fred Wolf; Fred Wolf's final episode as a featured player.
410	4	Dana Carvey	Dr. Dre	October 26, 1996
Dr. Dre performs "Been There, Done That".; Credited Featured Player: Colin Quinn; The "Tom Brokaw/Gerald Ford" sketch was originally performed on The Dana Carvey Show earlier that year. Dana Carvey (as Tom Brokaw) and Robert Smigel (in a voice-over role as the director) reprised their roles from the original sketch.
411	5	Chris Rock	The Wallflowers	November 2, 1996
The Wallflowers perform "One Headlight".; Credited Featured Players: (none); Dana Carvey makes a guest appearance, most notably as George H. W. Bush, who tells Norm Macdonald's Bob Dole to give up hope on the 1996 election. Carvey also appeared as Charles Grodin in a parody of "The Charles Grodin Show".; Cameo by Abe Vigoda in "The Charles Grodin Show" sketch.; Show writer Stephen Colbert appears in the Excedril commercial parody.
412	6	Robert Downey Jr.	Fiona Apple	November 16, 1996
Fiona Apple performs "Shadowboxer".; Credited Featured Players: (none); Bob Dole makes an appearance in the cold opening in which he and his wife, Elizabeth, ask Norm Macdonald to stop impersonating him after Dole's loss in the 1996 presidential election. Dole also says "Live from New York, it's Saturday Night!" and appears on Weekend Update.; Evander Holyfield makes a cameo appearance as himself in the "Don King's Press Conference" sketch.
413	7	Phil Hartman	Bush	November 23, 1996
Bush performs "Swallowed" and "Insect Kin".; Rodney Dangerfield appears on Weekend Update.; Credited Featured Players: (none); Cliff Robertson appears in the pre-filmed "Lux 420SL" commercial parody.; Hartman once again brings back his impersonation of Frank Sinatra on "The Joe Pesci Show" sketch.; This was Hartman's second and last hosting appearance on SNL before his death on May 28, 1998.
414	8	Martin Short	No Doubt	December 7, 1996
No Doubt performs "Don't Speak" and "Excuse Me Mr."; Chevy Chase makes a cameo appearance during a sketch featuring Short's Ed Grimley character.; Credited Featured Player: Colin Quinn; First appearance of the Celebrity Jeopardy! sketch. The episode re-aired in November 2020 following the passing of Alex Trebek, with a clip of Trebek in a Celebrity Jeopardy! sketch from a future season following the original sketch
415	9	Rosie O'Donnell	Whitney Houston	December 14, 1996
Whitney Houston performs "I Believe in You and Me" and "I Go to the Rock" with Georgia Mass Choir. She also appears in the monologue where she performs "I Got You Babe" with O'Donnell and Penny Marshall and in the Mary Katherine Gallagher sketch where she performs "Sleigh Ride" with Gallagher.; Credited Featured Player: Colin Quinn; Director/Actress Marshall, then O'Donnell's co-star in Kmart TV commercials, appears during the monologue, in a Mary Katherine Gallagher sketch, and in a Rita DelVecchio sketch.; Mike Judge cameos as Beavis and Butt-Head on Weekend Update.
416	10	Kevin Spacey	Beck	January 11, 1997
Beck performs "Where It's At" and "Devils Haircut". He also appears in the "Marijuana Doctor" sketch.; Credited Featured Players: (none); Monty Python cast members John Cleese and Michael Palin have cameos, appearing in the cold opening as well as in select sketches. (In the "Marijuana Doctor" sketch, Palin announces that he is "the star of TV's Home Improvement, Tim Allen".) Cleese and Palin also perform their classic "Dead Parrot" sketch from Monty Python's Flying Circus.; Norm MacDonald is David Letterman in a parody sketch of the talk show host wherein he interviews guest William Hurt, played by Spacey.
417	11	David Alan Grier	Snoop Doggy Dogg	January 18, 1997
Snoop Doggy Dogg performs "Snoop's Upside Ya Head" and "Vapors". Daz Dillinger and Charlie Wilson made cameo appearances in both performances. He also appears in the 20/20 parody sketch and the "Knicks Tickets/Waiting to Exhale" sketch.; Credited Featured Player: Colin Quinn; Stephen Colbert appears in TV Funhouse's "Wheaty The Wheaten Terrier" film.
418	12	Neve Campbell	David Bowie	February 8, 1997
David Bowie performs "Little Wonder" and "Scary Monsters (and Super Creeps)".; Credited Featured Player: Colin Quinn; David Spade makes guest appearances during the monologue and as Woody Allen on the 20/20 sketch. He also performs "The Hollywood Minute" during Weekend Update.
419	13	Chevy Chase	Live	February 15, 1997
Live performs "Lakini's Juice" and "Heropsychodreamer".; Credited Featured Player: Colin Quinn; As mentioned above, the episode marks the final hosting by Chase as of 2026; he was believed to have been banned from doing so again due to his longtime difficulties performing with the cast, with the final straw being an alleged incident in which he slapped Cheri Oteri in the head after she messed up a line during dress rehearsals for the "7 Action News" sketch.
420	14	Alec Baldwin	Tina Turner	February 22, 1997
Tina Turner performs "In Your Wildest Dreams" and "Proud Mary". She also appears in a Mary Katherine Gallagher sketch.; Credited Featured Players: (none); Howard Stern makes a guest appearance during Weekend Update.
421	15	Sting	Veruca Salt	March 15, 1997
Veruca Salt performs "Shutterbug".; Sting performs "My One & Only Love".; Credited Featured Player: Colin Quinn; Sting's wife Trudie Styler appears during the "Audition" sketch.; Mark Hamill appears during the "Shopping at Home Network" sketch.
422	16	Mike Myers	Aerosmith	March 22, 1997
Aerosmith performs "Falling in Love (Is Hard on the Knees)" and "Nine Lives". They also appear in a Mary Katherine Gallagher sketch.; Credited Featured Players: (none)
423	17	Rob Lowe	Spice Girls	April 12, 1997
Spice Girls perform "Wannabe" and "Say You'll Be There".; During the "Joe Pesci Show" sketch with Jim Breuer playing Pesci and Colin Quinn portraying Robert De Niro, the real Joe Pesci and Robert De Niro make cameo appearances.; During Weekend Update, Norm MacDonald coughs during one of the stories and says "The fuck was that?" He quickly laughs it off and jokes "My farewell performance." When he signs off at the end of Weekend Update, he says "Maybe I'll see you next week."; Credited Featured Player: Colin Quinn
424	18	Pamela Anderson	Rollins Band	April 19, 1997
Rollins Band performs "Starve".; Credited Featured Players: (none); Anderson's then-husband, rocker Tommy Lee, appeared as himself in the "Movie Shoot" sketch and "Hey, Remember the 80s" sketch.
425	19	John Goodman	Jewel	May 10, 1997
Jewel performs "Who Will Save Your Soul" and "You Were Meant for Me".; Credited Featured Players: (none); Mike Myers makes a guest appearance as Ron Wood in a sketch featuring Chris Kattan's gibberish speaking "Suel Forrester" character as a talk-show host.
426	20	Jeff Goldblum	En Vogue	May 17, 1997
En Vogue performs "Don't Let Go (Love)".; Credited Featured Player: Colin Quinn; Mark McKinney's final episode as a cast member.
