= Saturday Night Live season 24 =

Saturday Night Live
- Season 24
- No. of episodes: 19

Release
- Original network: NBC
- Original release: September 26, 1998 – May 15, 1999

Season chronology
- ← Previous season 23 Next → season 25

The twenty-fourth season of Saturday Night Live, an American sketch comedy series, originally aired in the United States on NBC between September 26, 1998, and May 15, 1999.

== Cast ==
Before the start of the season, Jim Breuer, who had been a cast member for three seasons since 1995, left the show at the request of head writer Adam McKay. Following Breuer's departure, the show added three new featured players: stand-up comedian Jimmy Fallon, Chris Parnell, a performer with The Groundlings in Los Angeles, and Upright Citizens Brigade and Second City performer Horatio Sanz.

Starting with this season, every new cast member is hired as a featured player before being promoted to Repertory; additionally, all featured players are credited for every episode, whether they appear or not.

Fallon, Parnell, and Sanz were all also promoted to repertory status during the following season.

Following the finale, no changes were made to the cast, and everyone returned for the next season.

=== Cast roster ===
**Repertory players**

- Will Ferrell
- Ana Gasteyer
- Darrell Hammond
- Chris Kattan
- Tim Meadows
- Tracy Morgan
- Cheri Oteri
- **Colin Quinn**
- Molly Shannon

**Featured players**

- Jimmy Fallon
- Chris Parnell
- Horatio Sanz

bold denotes Weekend Update anchor

== Writers ==
T. Sean Shannon joins the writing staff. This was also Adam McKay's last season as head writer, but he would return to the show the next season.

== Episodes ==
No. overall	No. in season	Host	Musical guest(s)	Original release date
447	1	Cameron Diaz	The Smashing Pumpkins	September 26, 1998
The Smashing Pumpkins perform "Perfect" and appeared in the Roxbury Guys sketch.; John Goodman made a cameo appearance as Linda Tripp during the cold open.; Jonathan Richman and Tommy Larkins, who performed musical interludes in Diaz's film There's Something About Mary, made a cameo appearance after the "What Does That Smell Like" sketch.; Dan Aykroyd and Steve Martin reprise their roles as The Festrunk Brothers (a.k.a. "The Wild and Crazy Guys") during the Roxbury Guys sketch.; Jimmy Fallon, Chris Parnell and Horatio Sanz's first episode as cast members (they are not credited as such, however, until the next episode).
448	2	Kelsey Grammer	Sheryl Crow	October 3, 1998
Sheryl Crow performs "My Favorite Mistake" with Wendy Melvoin.; Shaquille O'Neal appeared in two sketches: "Big Bernard," about an overgrown man who comes home late and receives a spanking from his father (played by Tracy Morgan), and "Morning Latte" as himself. He was initially intended to be the host of the episode, but had to back out due to unknown scheduling conflicts.; Guest appearances by Christine Baranski, Hal Linden and Patti Lupone, who were in the "Wet 'em Down!" sketch
449	3	Lucy Lawless	Elliott Smith	October 17, 1998
Elliott Smith performs "Waltz #2".; Chucky, the possessed doll from Bride of Chucky and related films, made a guest appearance on "Weekend Update", albeit voiced by another person.; Judge Judy appeared as herself in a sketch in which she is being mocked by Cheri Oteri.; Writer and future cast member Tina Fey appears during the monologue.; Michael Richards was originally to host but dropped out.
450	4	Ben Stiller	Alanis Morissette	October 24, 1998
Alanis Morissette performs "Thank U" and "Baba".; New York Yankees players David Cone, Chili Davis, Graeme Lloyd, Tino Martinez and David Wells appeared in the opening monologue.
451	5	David Spade	Eagle-Eye Cherry	November 7, 1998
Eagle-Eye Cherry performs "Save Tonight".; Brad Pitt appeared in the cold opening where David Spade visits his therapist (played by Pitt) about his overwhelming fame.; Former cast member Chris Rock cameoed in a Mango sketch as an admirer of a new dancer named Kiwi (played by Spade).
452	6	Joan Allen	Jewel	November 14, 1998
Jewel performs "Hands" and "Down So Long".; John Goodman made a cameo in a Suel Forrester sketch.
453	7	Jennifer Love Hewitt	Beastie Boys	November 21, 1998
Beastie Boys perform "Three MC's and One DJ" and "Sabotage".; Beastie Boy Adam Horovitz made a cameo appearance during the Spartan Cheerleaders sketch as Jennifer Love Hewitt's character's boyfriend.; Hewitt's co-star in the I Know What You Did Last Summer films, Muse Watson, made a cameo during the monologue as his character Ben Willis.; John Goodman made a cameo in the cold open as Linda Tripp.
454	8	Vince Vaughn	Lauryn Hill	December 5, 1998
Lauryn Hill performs "Doo Wop (That Thing)" and "Ex-Factor".
455	9	Alec Baldwin	Luciano Pavarotti; Vanessa Williams; Philadelphia Boys Choir & Chorale	December 12, 1998
Luciano Pavarotti and Vanessa Williams performs "Adeste Fideles".; Vanessa Williams also appeared as a 'Kwanzette' during Weekend Update while Tim Meadows sings a song about Kwanzaa with Janice Pendarvis.; John Goodman had a cameo appearance during Baldwin's monologue and in the "Bill Brasky" sketch featuring Goodman, Will Ferrell, and Alec Baldwin as drunken businessmen.
456	10	Bill Paxton	Beck	January 9, 1999
Beck performs "Nobody's Fault but My Own" and "Tropicalia". He also appeared in the Behind the Music Fat Albert parody sketch.; Titanic director James Cameron had a pre-recorded cameo in a sketch parodying his film.; Debbie Matenopoulos appeared as herself in a parody of The View.
457	11	James Van Der Beek	Everlast	January 16, 1999
Everlast performs "What It's Like".; Colin Quinn's last pre-Weekend Update monologue.; Darrell Hammond imitated an absent Don Pardo as announcer, particularly in a two-part running gag where 'Don Pardo' (Darrell Hammond) tries to seduce Van Der Beek.
458	12	Gwyneth Paltrow	Barenaked Ladies	February 6, 1999
Barenaked Ladies performs "It's All Been Done".; Ben Affleck cameoed in Paltrow's opening monologue.; Writer and future cast member Tina Fey appeared during the monologue.
459	13	Brendan Fraser	Busta Rhymes; The Roots	February 13, 1999
Busta Rhymes and The Roots performs "Gimme Some More" and "Tear da Roof Off".; John Goodman cameos as Linda Tripp during the cold open.; Former SNL writer/featured player Tom Davis appeared in the monologue.; George Plimpton appears after the "Shut Up and Enjoy the Ozzy" sketch.
460	14	Bill Murray	Lucinda Williams	February 20, 1999
Lucinda Williams performs "Can't Let Go" and "2 Kool 2 Be 4-gotten".; Former castmember (and co-star of Caddyshack) Chevy Chase appeared in the "Quotable Caddyshack" sketch to re-enact his one scene with Bill Murray.; Stephanie Seymour cameoed in the "Ladies Man" cold open.; Re-broadcasts the "Swill" commercial parody from Season 3 (10/08/1977), starring Bill Murray.
461	15	Ray Romano	The Corrs	March 13, 1999
The Corrs performs "What Can I Do?" and "So Young".; Romano's Everybody Loves Raymond co-stars, Peter Boyle and Doris Roberts, made cameo appearances during the monologue, in which Boyle discussed his time as host in the 1970s and Roberts discussed her role in My Giant.
462	16	Drew Barrymore	Garbage	March 20, 1999
Garbage performs "Special" and "When I Grow Up".; Edward Norton cameoed in a VH1 commercial parody as Daryl Dragon.
463	17	John Goodman	Tom Petty & the Heartbreakers	April 10, 1999
Tom Petty & The Heartbreakers performs "Swingin'" and "Room at the Top".; Writer and future cast member Tina Fey appears as a fake audience member interrupting the host during the monologue.; Dana Carvey was originally to host this episode with Goodman hosting an April 17th episode. But due to NBC budget cuts, that episode was cancelled and Goodman ended up hosting this episode.
464	18	Cuba Gooding Jr.	Ricky Martin	May 8, 1999
Ricky Martin performs "Livin' la Vida Loca".; Monica Lewinsky made a special appearance in the cold open where Bill Clinton (played by Darrell Hammond) imagines life after his presidency, and in a sketch with Tim Meadows' Ladies Man character.; John Goodman makes a voice-only guest appearance as Linda Tripp in the "Ladies Man" sketch.
465	19	Sarah Michelle Gellar	Backstreet Boys	May 15, 1999
Backstreet Boys performs "I Want It That Way" and "All I Have to Give".; David Boreanaz, Howie Dorough (from the Backstreet Boys) and Seth Green cameoed in the recurring sketch, "Tiger Beat's Ultra Super Duper Dreamy Love Show".

== Specials ==
Title	Original release date
"The Bad Boys of SNL"	September 26, 1998
The Roxbury Guys (Will Ferrell and Chris Kattan) host a show featuring SNL's Bad Boys (Chris Farley, Chris Rock, Adam Sandler, Rob Schneider, David Spade). Sketches include "Total Bastard Airlines", "The Gap Girls at the Mall", "Schmitt's Gay", "Dick Clark's Receptionist", "Spade in America", and "The Dark Side with Nat X".
"The Best of Dana Carvey"	October 10, 1998
A collection of some of Dana Carvey's sketches from his 6-year tenure on SNL.
"SNL Goes Commercial, Volume II"	November 28, 1998
Will Ferrell hosts this second collection of commercial parodies.
"The Best of Steve Martin"	November 28, 1998
A collection of some of Steve Martin's sketches from his episodes as host.
"Best of TV Parodies"	January 9, 1999
A compilation of some of SNL's TV parodies.
"Best of Game Show Parodies"	February 20, 1999
A collection of game show parodies from SNL's history.
"The Clinton/Lewinsky Scandal"	February 27, 1999
Darrell Hammond hosts a compilation of skits that parody the infamous Bill Clinton/Monica Lewinsky sex scandal. Sketches include "Mac's Bar", "MSNBC: White House in Crisis", "The Ladies' Man", and "E! Impeachment Coverage".
"The Best of Mike Myers"	June 19, 1999
A compilation of sketches from Mike Myers' 6-year tenure on SNL. Sketches include "Wayne's World Meets Aerosmith", "Hedley & Wyche", "Sprockets: Germany's Most Disturbing Home Videos", "Coffee Talk", and "Simon".

== A Night at the Roxbury film ==
A Night at the Roxbury, a film based on the popular Roxbury Guys sketches, was released on October 2, 1998. Cast members Will Ferrell, Chris Kattan, Mark McKinney, Colin Quinn and Molly Shannon all appear in the film. The film did modestly well at the box office but was panned by critics.
