= Saturday Night Live season 27 =

Saturday Night Live
- Season 27
- No. of episodes: 20

Release
- Original network: NBC
- Original release: September 29, 2001 – May 18, 2002

Season chronology
- ← Previous season 26 Next → season 28

The twenty-seventh season of Saturday Night Live, an American sketch comedy series, originally aired in the United States on NBC between September 29, 2001 and May 18, 2002.

Eighteen days before the season started, the September 11 terrorist attacks took place in New York. The season premiere (hosted by Reese Witherspoon) went on as scheduled, with a special cold open featuring Rudy Giuliani, the Mayor of New York City at the time, along with firefighters from the FDNY and police officers from the NYPD, declaring that despite the terrorist attack, New York City will run as normal and Saturday Night Live will go on as planned (with Lorne Michaels asking Giuliani "Can we be funny?" and Giuliani replying "Why start now?").

Three weeks into the season the show faced another scare when anthrax was found in the GE Building (from where the show is broadcast). The scare caused most of the cast and crew, as well as that week's guest host Drew Barrymore, to evacuate the building.

== Cast ==
Before the start of the season, longtime cast member Molly Shannon, who had been on the show for six years since 1995, departed midway through the previous season on her own terms, and featured player Jerry Minor and repertory cast member Chris Parnell were both let go from the show after the finale. However, Parnell was hired back to the show midseason in the episode hosted by Jonny Moseley, becoming the second cast member to be hired back to the show after being fired, the first person being Jim Belushi in 1983.

Four new cast members were hired to the show this season: stand-up comic Dean Edwards, Chicago improviser Seth Meyers, Amy Poehler of the Upright Citizens Brigade comedy troupe, and stand-up comic/impressionist Jeff Richards, who was previously a cast member on the rival sketch show MADtv. Rachel Dratch, Tina Fey, and Maya Rudolph were all upgraded to repertory status at the beginning of the season, and Poehler was promoted to repertory status mid-season.

Will Ferrell was absent from a number of episodes because he was filming Old School. This would also be the final season for both Ferrell and Ana Gasteyer. After Gasteyer went on maternity leave at the end of the season, she decided not to return to the show.

=== Cast roster ===
**Repertory players**

- Rachel Dratch
- **Jimmy Fallon**
- Will Ferrell
- **Tina Fey**
- Ana Gasteyer
- Darrell Hammond
- Chris Kattan
- Tracy Morgan
- Chris Parnell (first episode back: March 2, 2002)
- Amy Poehler (upgraded to repertory status: January 12, 2002)
- Maya Rudolph
- Horatio Sanz

**Featured players**

- Dean Edwards
- Seth Meyers
- Jeff Richards

bold denotes "Weekend Update" anchor

== Writers ==
Emily Spivey, Doug Abeles, and Charlie Grandy join the writing staff with this season.

This was also the final season for longtime writers Hugh Fink (who had been a writer since 1995) and Matt Piedmont (who had written at the show since 1996, and is called out by departing-cast member Will Ferrell via a cue card for what was their last episode). Fink wrote for the show for seven years, while Piedmont was there for six.

== Episodes ==
No. overall	No. in season	Host	Musical guest(s)	Original release date
506	1	Reese Witherspoon	Alicia Keys	September 29, 2001
Alicia Keys performs "Fallin'" and "A Woman's Worth".; Being the first episode to air following the 9/11 attacks, New York Mayor Rudy Giuliani along with members of the New York City Fire Department (FDNY) appear in the cold opening to encourage New York and Saturday Night Live to carry on in the face of adversity. When asked by Lorne Michaels "Can we be funny?" Giuliani replies "Why start now?" In addition to appearances by Giuliani and the FDNY, Paul Simon plays "The Boxer" during the cold open.; Dean Edwards, Seth Meyers, Amy Poehler and Jeff Richards's first episode as cast members.
507	2	Seann William Scott	Sum 41	October 6, 2001
Sum 41 performs "Fat Lip" and "In Too Deep".; Former cast member Chevy Chase made a cameo on Weekend Update as the Land Shark. Chase ends the segment by saying "Goodnight and have a pleasant tomorrow," the sign-off used by both Chase and Fey during their tenures on Weekend Update.; Ben Stiller was originally scheduled to host this episode, but backed out due to the difficulties he had of performing post-9/11.
508	3	Drew Barrymore	Macy Gray	October 13, 2001
Macy Gray performs "Sexual Revolution" and "Sweet Baby".; Tom Green appears during the opening monologue.; Former cast member Colin Quinn, introduced by Tina Fey as the "New Yorkiest New Yorker I know," appears on Weekend Update to give his NYC-centric take on current events.; John Popper performs with the Saturday Night Live Band during this episode.
509	4	John Goodman	Ja Rule	November 3, 2001
Ja Rule performs "Always on Time" with Ashanti and "Livin' It Up" with Case.; Former cast member Dan Aykroyd appears during the "Hudson Valley Community Circuit" sketch, during Weekend Update, reprising his role as Elwood Blues, and during the "Bad Conceptual Theater" sketch, reprising his role as Leonard Pinth-Garnell.; This episode marks the last time Goodman would host SNL until Season 39.
510	5	Gwyneth Paltrow	Ryan Adams	November 10, 2001
Ryan Adams performs "New York, New York".; Matt Damon appears during the "Mango" sketch.; Dr. John performs with the Saturday Night Live Band during this episode.
511	6	Billy Bob Thornton	Creed	November 17, 2001
Creed performs "My Sacrifice" and "Bullets".; Ashton Kutcher appears during the monologue.
512	7	Derek Jeter	Bubba Sparxxx; Shakira	December 1, 2001
Shakira performs "Whenever, Wherever".; Bubba Sparxxx performs "Ugly" and "Lovely".; David Cone and David Wells appear during the "Yankee Wives" sketch.; Clips from the season 2 episode featuring musical guest George Harrison are shown after Weekend Update, commemorating his death earlier in the week.
513	8	Hugh Jackman	Mick Jagger	December 8, 2001
Mick Jagger performs "God Gave Me Everything" and "Visions of Paradise", and appears during the "Dressing Room" sketch and the "Versace" sketch.
514	9	Ellen DeGeneres	No Doubt	December 15, 2001
No Doubt performs "Hey Baby" and "Hella Good".; Rudy Giuliani appears during Weekend Update.; Chris Parnell makes a vocal cameo appearance as Tom Brokaw during the "Narrator Who Ruined Christmas" cartoon.
515	10	Josh Hartnett	Pink	January 12, 2002
Pink performs "Get The Party Started" and "Don't Let Me Get Me", and appears during the "Shout Out!! Show" sketch.; Amy Poehler is promoted from featured player to repertory player in this episode.; Will Ferrell is absent for this episode.
516	11	Jack Black	The Strokes	January 19, 2002
The Strokes performs "Last Nite" and "Hard to Explain".; Black's Tenacious D bandmate Kyle Gass appears during the opening monologue and during Weekend Update.
517	12	Britney Spears	Britney Spears	February 2, 2002
Britney Spears performs "I'm Not a Girl, Not Yet a Woman" and "Boys".; Dan Aykroyd, who co-starred with Spears in the film Crossroads (released a few weeks after this episode) appears during the Mormon skiers cold-open, the "Leather Man" sketch, and introduces Spears' second performance.; Justin Timberlake appears during the opening monologue and introduces Spears' first performance.
518	13	Jonny Moseley	Outkast	March 2, 2002
OutKast performs "The Whole World" (with Killer Mike) and "Ms. Jackson".; Rip Taylor appears during the "Super Buzzers" sketch.; Chris Parnell rejoins the cast after having been laid off at the end of last season for budgetary reasons.
519	14	Jon Stewart	India.Arie	March 9, 2002
India.Arie performs "Video" and "Ready For Love".; George Plimpton appears during the pre-recorded "Cheese Game" commercial.; Mike Judge appears in the TV Funhouse "Fun With Real Audio" cartoon, providing the voices for Beavis and Butt-Head.; Will Ferrell is absent for this episode.
520	15	Ian McKellen	Kylie Minogue	March 16, 2002
Kylie Minogue performs "Can't Get You Out of My Head" and "In Your Eyes," and appears during the "Versace Oscar Party" sketch.; This episode won an Emmy for writing, the show's first since 1989.; Will Ferrell is absent for this episode.
521	16	Cameron Diaz	Jimmy Eat World	April 6, 2002
Jimmy Eat World performs "The Middle" and "Sweetness".
522	17	The Rock	Andrew W.K.	April 13, 2002
Andrew W.K. performs "Party Hard" and "I Get Wet".
523	18	Alec Baldwin	P.O.D.	April 20, 2002
P.O.D. performs "Youth of the Nation" and "Alive".
524	19	Kirsten Dunst	Eminem	May 11, 2002
Eminem performs "Without Me" with Proof. The two also appear during the "Audition" sketch.; David Spade and Jared Fogle perform voice roles in the "Bambi 2002" cartoon.
525	20	Winona Ryder	Moby	May 18, 2002
Moby performs "We Are All Made of Stars" and "South Side", and appears in a Mango sketch parodying Ryder's shoplifting incident.; Alex Trebek appears in the Celebrity Jeopardy! sketch, alongside Ferrell's portrayal of him, and cancels the Final Jeopardy!; Neil Diamond appears during Weekend Update alongside Ferrell's portrayal of him.; Will Ferrell and Ana Gasteyer's final episode as cast members.

== Special ==
Title	Original release date
"SNL Remembers John Belushi"	March 11, 2002
To commemorate the 20th anniversary of John's death, Jimmy Fallon and Tina Fey host this retrospective of some of his greatest sketches on SNL. Dan Aykroyd makes a cameo appearance in this special.
