= Saturday Night Live season 26 =

Saturday Night Live
- Season 26
- No. of episodes: 20

Release
- Original network: NBC
- Original release: October 7, 2000 – May 19, 2001

Season chronology
- ← Previous season 25 Next → season 27

The twenty-sixth season of Saturday Night Live, an American sketch comedy series, originally aired in the United States on NBC between October 7, 2000, and May 19, 2001.

== History ==
=== 2000 presidential election ===
The 2000–01 season was also noted for its well-received spoofing of that year's presidential campaign between Al Gore and George W. Bush. The two candidates even appeared (separately) on a special with the cast in fall 2000. Will Ferrell's Bush impression coined the term "strategery" in a sketch mocking Bush's propensity for mispronunciations, while Darrell Hammond's Gore was characterized by his slow, deliberate drawl and use of the term "lockbox" during the show's debate sketches.

In April 2015, Ferrell stated that he thought his impression "humanized" Bush to the country and may have won him the election, and that Hammond's "rigid, robotic-like" take on Gore may have influenced the result also.

== Cast ==
Before the start of the season, longtime cast members Tim Meadows, Cheri Oteri, and Colin Quinn all left the show. Meadows had been on the show for a then-record 10 seasons since 1991, while Oteri and Quinn had both been on for five seasons since 1995. The show added two new featured players: SNL head writer Tina Fey and Second City comedian Jerry Minor. Fey had been a writer on the show since 1997 and began as the show's head writer in 1999. Rachel Dratch and Maya Rudolph remained featured players. Minor was let go following this season.

This would be Molly Shannon's final season on the show. Leaving midseason, she surpassed Victoria Jackson as the show's longest-serving female cast member (Amy Poehler would surpass Shannon's record seven years later).

Chris Parnell was fired at the end of this season, but then rehired midway through the next season. Executive producer Lorne Michaels would later admit he made a mistake in firing Parnell.

In 1999, Tina Fey became the show's first female head writer. With Colin Quinn's Weekend Update tenure over, Lorne Michaels teamed Fey with Jimmy Fallon this season, the first duo to anchor the segment since Christine Ebersole and Brian Doyle-Murray in the early 1980s. This pairing was well received by critics. Fey appeared occasionally as an extra before being hired as a cast member. Fey was a featured player during her first season and was then promoted to contract player, while still maintaining her position as head writer.

This season also marked the first time since Season 14 that John Goodman didn't host at all. He had previously hosted at least one episode per season for a ten-year stretch.

=== Cast roster ===
**Repertory players**

- **Jimmy Fallon**
- Will Ferrell
- Ana Gasteyer
- Darrell Hammond
- Chris Kattan
- Tracy Morgan
- Chris Parnell
- Horatio Sanz
- Molly Shannon (final episode: February 17, 2001)

**Featured players**

- Rachel Dratch
- **Tina Fey**
- Jerry Minor
- Maya Rudolph

bold denotes "Weekend Update" anchor

== Writers ==
Jim Downey rejoins the writing staff this season. James Anderson, who went on to write on SNL for decades, joins the writing staff as a new writer.

Starting with the Charlie Sheen-hosted episode, Tina Fey's is officially credited as head writer (as opposed to writing supervisor like the previous season, in which she was in the same role, just under a different name).

Additionally, starting with that episode, longtime writer Dennis McNicholas (who had been a writer since 1995) is named as Fey's co-head writer, after having been a creative consultant for the past 1½ seasons; meanwhile, fellow writer Harper Steele (who had been a writer since 1995) was officially named a Creative Consultant, now renamed as Writing Supervisor, alongside Paula Pell.

Erik Kenward (a current producer for the show) joins the writing staff with the Katie Holmes-hosted episode.

This was also the final season for longtime writers Adam McKay (a writer for six years since 1995) and Robert Carlock (a writer for five years since 1996).

== Episodes ==
No. overall	No. in season	Host	Musical guest(s)	Original release date
486	1	Rob Lowe	Eminem	October 7, 2000
Eminem performs "Stan" (with Dido) and "The Real Slim Shady", and also appeared during Weekend Update.; 2000 presidential candidate Ralph Nader made a cameo appearance during the "Backstage" sketch.; Brendan Fraser cameos in the "Personal Profile" sketch featuring Chris Kattan getting ready for the next sketch like the athletes featured in the Olympic Profiles segment.; The George W. Bush/Al Gore presidential debate sketch in this episode is credited with coining the word "strategery".; Tina Fey and Jerry Minor's first episode as cast members.; Jimmy Fallon and Fey's first episode as Weekend Update co-anchors.; Former cast member Tim Meadows appears on Weekend Update to promote The Ladies Man, a film produced by SNL Studios.
487	2	Kate Hudson	Radiohead	October 14, 2000
Radiohead performs "The National Anthem" and "Idioteque".; Nomar Garciaparra appears as himself during a Boston Teens sketch.
488	3	Dana Carvey	The Wallflowers	October 21, 2000
The Wallflowers perform "Sleepwalker" and "Hand Me Down".; Baha Men make a surprise appearance and perform "Who Let the Dogs Out?".; Robert De Niro appears as himself during Weekend Update to discuss Jimmy Fallon's negative review of Meet the Parents from the previous episode.
489	4	Charlize Theron	Paul Simon	November 4, 2000
Paul Simon performs "Hurricane Eye" and "Old". He also appears in the DiMarco Brothers sketch.; SNL writer and stand up comedian Hugh Fink appears as himself on Weekend Update in a commentary on Judaism and Joe Lieberman.
490	5	Calista Flockhart	Ricky Martin	November 11, 2000
Ricky Martin performs "She Bangs" and "Loaded".; Chris Kattan impersonates Martin right before the real Martin performs the song "Loaded" (from Martin's album Sound Loaded).; Giovanni Hidalgo performs percussion during Martin's musical performances.
491	6	Tom Green	David Gray	November 18, 2000
David Gray performs "Babylon" and appears in the "Wedding" sketch.; Drew Barrymore is in the audience and mentioned in the monologue by Tom Green.; Gwyneth Paltrow appears on Weekend Update.; Tom's parents Mary Jane and Richard Green appear in the opening monologue and the "Wedding" sketch.; Shawn Greenson, Derek Harvie, and Glenn Humplik appear in the "Wedding" sketch.; Green brought in his own writers for this episode, which angered the cast.
492	7	Val Kilmer	U2	December 9, 2000
U2 performs "Beautiful Day" and "Elevation".; The previous day marked the 20th anniversary of the murder of John Lennon; Bono paid tribute to Lennon by singing a verse of "All You Need Is Love" over the end of "Beautiful Day".; The Director, Associate Directors, and Stage Managers who worked on this episode won a Directors Guild of America Award for Outstanding Directorial Achievement.
493	8	Lucy Liu	Jay-Z	December 16, 2000
Jay-Z performs "I Just Wanna Love U (Give It 2 Me)" and "Is That Your Chick," and cameos in the "Robert Goulet Rap Album" sketch.; Beanie Sigel and Memphis Bleek join Jay-Z for both musical performances and also appear in the "Robert Goulet Rap Album" sketch.
494	9	Charlie Sheen	Nelly Furtado	January 13, 2001
Nelly Furtado performs "I'm Like a Bird".; Charlie Sheen reprises his role as Ricky Vaughn from the Major League films in "The NFL Pregame" sketch.
495	10	Mena Suvari	Lenny Kravitz	January 20, 2001
Lenny Kravitz performs "Again" and "Mr. Cab Driver" and appears in two sketches as himself; one as holding auditions for Kyle and Sean DeMarco (Chris Kattan and Chris Parnell) and another going through airport security.; Former U.S. Attorney General Janet Reno makes a special appearance in the "Janet Reno's Dance Party" sketch where she confronts Janet Reno (portrayed by Will Ferrell).; Fred Wesley performs with the SNL Band.
496	11	Jennifer Lopez	Jennifer Lopez	February 10, 2001
Jennifer Lopez performs "Play" and "Love Don't Cost a Thing".; Tom Hanks makes a brief appearance during Weekend Update.; Tracy Morgan opens the show by saying, "Live from New York, it's Jennifer Lopez's booty!"; This episode was delayed on the East Coast by 45 minutes due to a double overtime XFL football game.
497	12	Sean Hayes	Shaggy	February 17, 2001
Shaggy performs "It Wasn't Me" with Rikrok and "Angel" with Rikrok and Rayvon.; G. E. Smith and T-Bone Wolk perform with the Saturday Night Live Band.; Molly Shannon's final episode as a cast member.
498	13	Katie Holmes	Dave Matthews Band	February 24, 2001
Dave Matthews Band performs "I Did It" and "The Space Between".; Junior Brown performs with the Saturday Night Live Band.
499	14	Conan O'Brien	Don Henley	March 10, 2001
Don Henley performs "Everything Is Different Now" and "The Heart of the Matter".; Max Weinberg, the drummer on Late Night with Conan O'Brien, and Weinberg's wife Becky appear in O'Brien's opening monologue.; Ben Affleck appears at the end of the "Boston Teens at the Liquor Store" sketch.
500	15	Julia Stiles	Aerosmith	March 17, 2001
Aerosmith performs "Jaded" and "Big Ten Inch Record".; David Copperfield appears during "Weekend Update".
501	16	Alec Baldwin	Coldplay	April 7, 2001
Coldplay performs "Yellow" and "Don't Panic".; David Spade appears on Weekend Update to plug his movie Joe Dirt. Co-star Kid Rock also makes an appearance and does a few "Hollywood Minute" jokes.
502	17	Renée Zellweger	Eve	April 14, 2001
Eve and Gwen Stefani (who isn't credited for her appearance) performs "Let Me Blow Ya Mind" for the first performance. Eve performs "Who's That Girl?" for the second performance.; Molly Shannon makes an appearance in the "Doctor's Office" sketch.
503	18	Pierce Brosnan	Destiny's Child	May 5, 2001
Destiny's Child performs "Survivor" and "Emotion," and also appears in a sketch as former members of "Gemini's Twin", a recurring parody of the group.; Julia Stiles appears in the cold opening, as George W. Bush's daughter, Jenna.; Molly Shannon appears in an SNL Digital Short, "Five Finger Di$count".
504	19	Lara Flynn Boyle	Bon Jovi	May 12, 2001
Bon Jovi performs "It's My Life" and "You Give Love a Bad Name". He and Richie Sambora also appear in a skit holding auditions for backup dancers with Kyle and Sean DeMarco (Chris Kattan and Chris Parnell).; During the "MSNBC Investigates" (Golden Girls parody) sketch, Chris Kattan broke his neck.; Lou Reed makes an appearance on Weekend Update.
505	20	Christopher Walken	Weezer	May 19, 2001
Weezer performs "Hash Pipe" and "Island in the Sun".; Former cast member Kevin Nealon appears during Weekend Update to tell viewers he is not on SNL anymore and that viewers who do see him are watching reruns from the 1990s that at the time aired on Comedy Central.; Winona Ryder appears during The Weekend Update Cliffhanger.; Jerry Minor's final episode as a cast member.; Chris Parnell's final episode as a cast member (until the middle of the next season).; This is the last episode to air before the 9/11 attacks.

== Specials ==
Title	Original release date
"2000 Presidential Bash"	November 3, 2000
The special included election material from this year and years past. Rachel Dratch, Will Ferrell and Darrell Hammond hosted the special while doing a number of different impressions. This special also featured cameo appearances from George W. Bush, Al Gore, Jesse Ventura, George H. W. Bush, Barbara Bush and Dana Carvey.
"Thursday Night Live (1)"	February 1, 2001
"The Culps' Mandatory Drug Awareness Assembly" sketch from this episode was included in the prime-time special "SNL Mother's Day Special 2001" as well as the clip show "The Best of Will Ferrell".
"Thursday Night Live (2)"	February 8, 2001
"The Best of Molly Shannon"	March 20, 2001
The special included material featuring Molly Shannon during her stint on the show. Sketches include "Mary Katherine Gallagher," "Leg Up," "The Courtney Love Show," "Pretty Living," "Delicious Dish," "Rockettes Auditions," "Monica Lewinsky in Congress," "Fanatic" (film), "Blind Date At The Airport," "Veronica and Co.," "Dame Elizabeth Taylor," and "Jeannie Darcy".
"Mother's Day Special 2001"	May 13, 2001
The first SNL Mother's Day special since 1993, the episode featured the cast and their mothers talking about their favorite sketches aired on the show. Sketches included "Behind the Music: Rock & Roll Heaven", "TRL: Gemini's Twin", "Mango vs. J.Lo", "The Weakest Link" and more. This special contained a special tribute to singer-songwriter Minnie Riperton, who was the mother of cast member Maya Rudolph.

== The Ladies Man film ==
Based on Leon Phelps' popular sketches, The Ladies Man film was released on October 13, 2000. The film's star Tim Meadows left Saturday Night Live at the end of the previous season but returned to promote the film in the first episode of this season. Cast members Will Ferrell and Chris Parnell and former SNL cast member Mark McKinney co-starred in this film. The movie was panned by critics and flopped at the box office.

== See also ==
- History of Saturday Night Live
