= Jim Breuer =

American actor and comedian (born 1967)

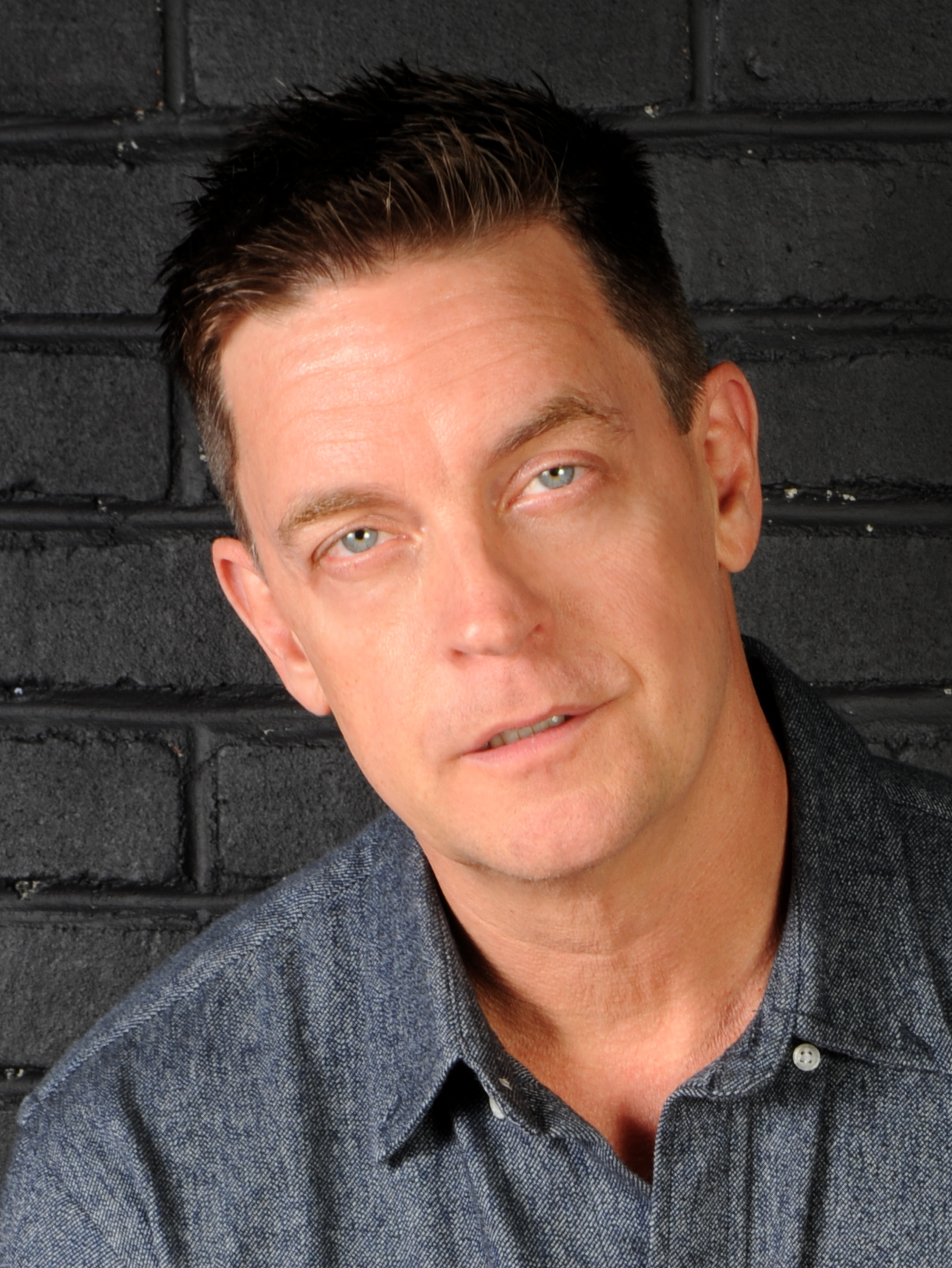
- Breuer in 2017
- Born: June 21, 1967 (age 59); Valley Stream, New York, U.S.
- Notable work: Saturday Night Live; Half Baked; Premium Blends; Web Junk 20; Fridays with Jim Breuer
- Spouse: Dee Breuer (m. 1992)
- Children: 3
- Relatives: Nancy Allen (cousin)

Comedy career
- Years active: 1988–present
- Medium: Stand-up; television; film; radio
- Genres: Observational comedy; improvisational comedy; character comedy; music
- Subjects: Everyday life; marriage; parenting; heavy metal music
- Website: www.jimbreuer.com

James Breuer (born June 21, 1967) is an American stand-up comedian and actor. He was a cast member on Saturday Night Live from 1995 to 1998 and starred in the film Half Baked (1998).

== Career ==
Breuer was a member of the cast of Saturday Night Live from 1995 to 1998, playing characters such as Joe Pesci and Goat Boy. He went on to host The Jim Breuer Show after leaving SNL.

Breuer regularly tours as a comedian. Footage of his 2008 tour was used in his documentary More Than Me and in his four-hour DVD program The Jim Breuer Road Journals. In September 2021, he cancelled shows at venues requiring COVID-19 vaccination in New Jersey and Michigan and has stated that he will not perform at venues with such requirements.

In 2023, Breuer appeared as a featured speaker on the ReAwaken America Tour. During one appearance, Breuer received backlash for mocking the collapse of football player Damar Hamlin; he suggested the collapse was caused by COVID-19 vaccines, echoing conspiracy theories in anti-vaccine circles.

== Personal life ==
Breuer was born in Valley Stream, New York, and graduated in 1985 from Valley Stream Central High School.

From 2005 to 2021, he lived in Chester Township, New Jersey, with his wife Dee, whom he married in 1992, and their three daughters. In August 2021, Breuer and his family moved to Naples, Florida, after selling their home in New Jersey.

Breuer is a cousin of actress Nancy Allen through her mother and his father.

== Discography ==
- Jim Breuer and the Loud & Rowdy – Songs from the Garage (2016; Metal Blade Records)

== Filmography ==
Year	Title	Role	Notes
1992–1994	Uptown Comedy Club	Various	
1995–1998	Saturday Night Live	Various	Cast Member
1995	Home Improvement	Jim	Episode: "Talk to Me"
1995	Clerks: The TV Show	Randal Graves	TV pilot
1996	Buddies	Jim	Unaired Pilot
1998	Half Baked	Brian	
1999	Dick	John Dean	
2000	Titan A.E.	The Cook	Voice
2000	Once in the Life	Pizzaman	
2001	One Eyed King	Patrick 'Paddy' O'Donahue	
2002	American Dummy	Tony Metropolis	Short
2003	Crooked Lines	Chris	
2003	MTV Icon	Himself	Special; Episode: "Metallica"
2006	Beer League	Football Guy	
2010	More than Me	Himself	
2010	The Jim Breuer Road Journals	Himself	
2011	Zookeeper	Crow	Voice
2012–2013	Motorcity	Tooley	Voice, 11 episodes
2013	The English Teacher	Narcissist Man	
2013	Wonder Pets	Strawman (voice)	Episode: "In The land of Oz!"
2014	Family Guy	Joe Pesci (voice)	Episode: "Brian's a Bad Father"
2014	School Dance	Officer Lagney	
2015	Quitters		
2016	Bling	Mr. Glump	Voice
2016	Rock and a Hard Place	Pastor Darren	
2016–2017	Kevin Can Wait	Father Phillip	4 episodes
2017	Liv & Maddie	Himself	Episode: "Big Break-A-Rooney"
2023	Jingle Smells	Blake Ashton	
