= Cheri Oteri =

American actress and comedian (born 1962)

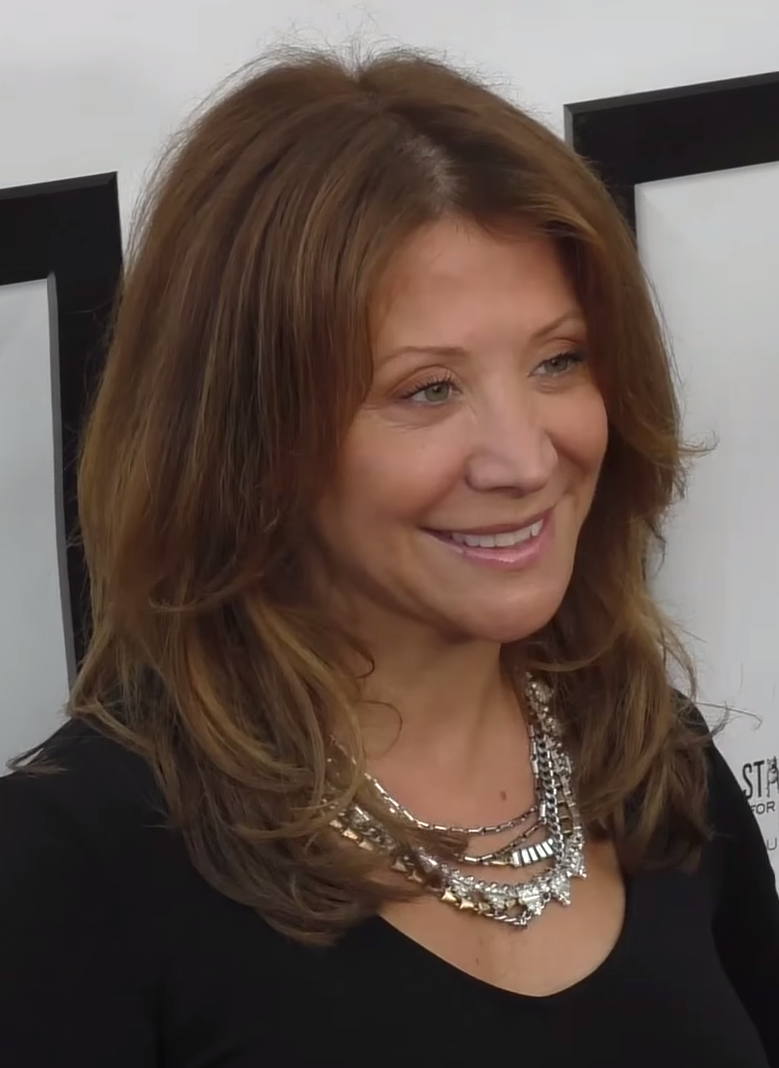
- Oteri in 2016
- Born: September 19, 1962 (age 64); Upper Darby, Pennsylvania, U.S.
- Occupations: Actress; comedian
- Years active: 1987–present

Signature
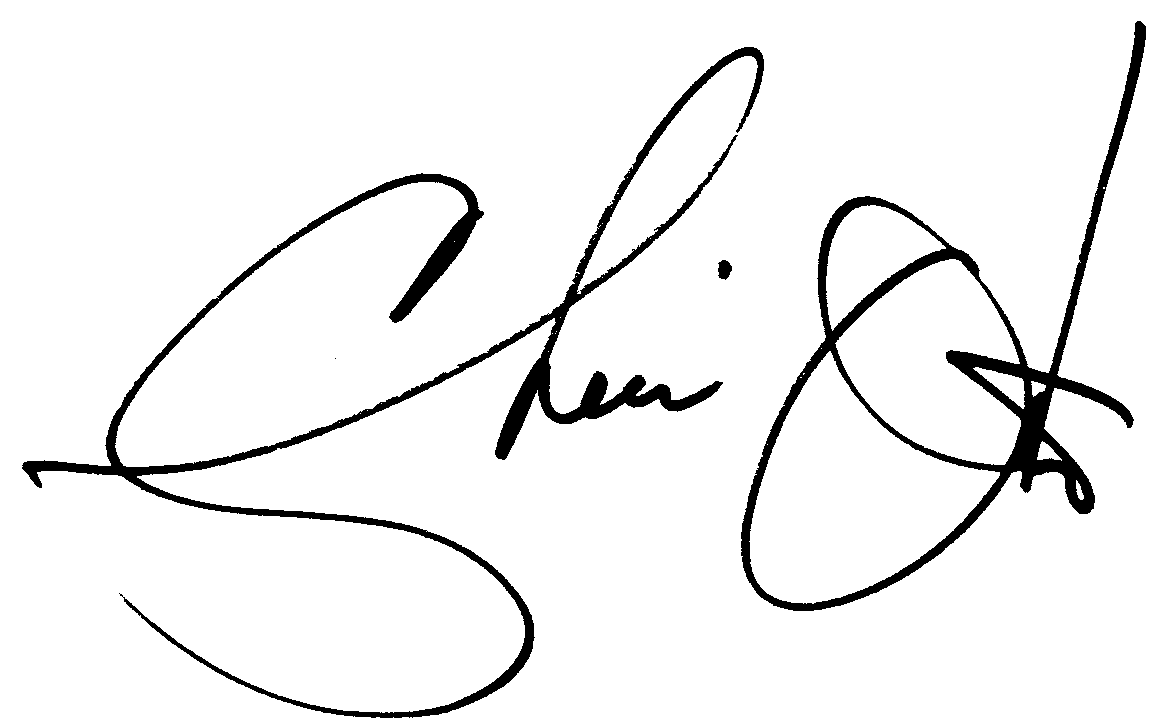

Cheri Oteri (/oʊˈtɛri/; born September 19, 1962) is an American actress and comedian. A Primetime Emmy Award nominee, she is best known for her tenure as a cast member on the NBC sketch comedy series Saturday Night Live from 1995 to 2000 and for her role as Gail Hailstorm in the Scary Movie film series.

== Early life ==
Oteri was born on September 19, 1962, in Upper Darby, Pennsylvania, the daughter of Patricia (née Breen) and Gaetano Thomas Oteri. She is of Italian ancestry.

== Career ==
=== Saturday Night Live (1995–2000) ===
After moving to Los Angeles at age 25, Oteri worked at A&M Records for four years and eventually joined famed comedy troupe The Groundlings. In 1995, producers of Saturday Night Live (SNL) attended a performance with the intention of auditioning fellow Groundlings member Chris Kattan. Oteri performed a monologue during one of Kattan's costume changes, which led to her own invitation to audition for SNL, along with Kattan and fellow Groundling Will Ferrell. She was hired as a performer in September 1995 as part of an almost-entirely new cast, which was brought in after the show's disastrous 1994–1995 season.

Celebrities that Oteri impersonated included Alanis Morissette, Barbara Walters, Cyndi Lauper, Mariah Carey, Marla Maples, Debbie Reynolds, Jennifer Lopez, Ross Perot, Jennifer Tilly, Paula Jones, Tori Spelling, Melanie C, Robin Byrd, Jessica Simpson, Fran Drescher, Marisa Tomei, Katie Couric and Gloria Stuart.

==== Original characters ====
- Arianna, a member of The Spartan Cheerleaders (with Will Ferrell)
- Rita DelVecchio, a grouchy Philadelphia woman who is mean to the neighborhood children, patterned after Oteri's tough-talking grandmother.
- Cass Van Rye, the dim-witted co-host of the "Morning Latte" talk show (with Will Ferrell)
- Mickey "The Dyke", a butch public-access television cable TV host (with Mark McKinney)
- Nadeen, a testy employee whose catchphrase constantly orders everyone to "Simmer down now!"
- Althea McMahonaman, an absurdly hyper child who is an awful passenger and disturbs public servants
- Collette Reardon, a prescription pill addict
- Joy Lipton, Erotic Attic boutique owner
- Adele, a vulgar and highly sexual office worker whose attempts at sexual innuendos disgust rather than attract her colleagues
- Laura Zimmerman, one half of the Zimmermans, who suddenly break into rough and sexual behavior before returning to casual conversation as if nothing happened (with Chris Kattan)

=== 2001–present ===
Oteri has appeared in supporting roles in the films Liar Liar, Inspector Gadget, Scary Movie, Dumb and Dumberer: When Harry Met Lloyd, and Southland Tales; and voiced characters in The Ant Bully and Shrek the Third.

She starred in two TV pilots that did not make it to air: Loomis and With You in Spirit; and made guest appearances in the series Just Shoot Me!, Strangers with Candy, and Curb Your Enthusiasm. In 2009, Oteri became a regular voice cast in the Fox animated comedy series, Sit Down, Shut Up. She voices Helen Klench, the unappreciated librarian who often gets mistaken for objects, such as brooms or toilet brushes. The series premiered on April 19, 2009 and moved to Comedy Central in May 2010.

Oteri played a tooth fairy on Imagination Movers, a regular on the Playhouse Disney block. She starred in the AMC web series Liza Life Coach in 2010. Oteri appeared in the pilot episode of Glory Daze, which premiered on TBS on November 16, 2010. She hosted AXS TV's Gotham Comedy Live on May 26, 2016, in New York City.

Oteri is an occasional guest on Jeff Lewis' talk radio show on Radio Andy, the Andy Cohen channel on SiriusXM. She also appeared as a guest judge on Season 34, episode 9 of Beat Bobby Flay entitled, Cheri Takes the Cake.

In 2025, Oteri began a recurring role on the NBC sitcom Happy's Place as Monica, the health inspector. In 2026, she reprised her role as Gail Hailstorm in the revived Scary Movie sequel.

== Filmography ==
=== Film ===
Year	Title	Role	Notes
1997	Liar Liar	Jane	
1997	Austin Powers: International Man of Mystery	Flight Attendant	Uncredited
1998	Small Soldiers	Globotech Telephone Operator	Uncredited
1999	Inspector Gadget	Mayor Wilson	
2000	Love & Sex	Mary	
2000	Lured Innocence	Molly	
2000	Scary Movie	Gail Hailstorm	
2003	Sol Goode	Bernadette Best	
2003	Dumb and Dumberer: When Harry Met Lloyd	Ms. Heller	
2004	Surviving Eden	Maria Villanova	
2005	Smile	Linda	
2006	Southland Tales	Zora Charmichaels	
2006	Park	Claire	
2006	The Ant Bully	Doreen Nickle (voice)	
2007	Shrek the Third	Sleeping Beauty / Actress (voices)	
2008	Surveillance	Mom	
2008	Private Valentine: Blonde & Dangerous	Private Jeter	
2011	And They're Off	Dee	
2012	Bad Parents	Melissa	
2013	Grown Ups 2	Penny	
2014	Wishin' and Hopin'	Sister Dymphna	
2017	F the Prom	Christine Datner	
2019	Benjamin	Clarice	
2019	Drama Drama	Miss Macy	
2022	Out of Office	Janet	TV movie
2022	Give or Take	Patty King	
2024	Big City Greens the Movie: Spacecation	Gwendolyn Zapp (voice)	TV movie
2025	Dog Man	Mayor (voice)	
2026	Scary Movie	Gail Hailstorm	
2026	Hexed †	TBA (voice)	

=== Television ===
Year	Title	Role	Notes
1995–2000	Saturday Night Live	Various	Main cast
1997–1999	Just Shoot Me!	Cindy	2 episodes Nominated—Primetime Emmy Award for Outstanding Guest Actress in a Comedy Series
1998	Hercules	Princess Lavina (voice)	Episode: "Hercules and the Jilt Trip"
2000	Strangers with Candy	Hillary	Episode: "The Last Temptation of Blank"
2001	Ally McBeal	Melissa	Episode: "Cloudy Skies, Chance of Parade"
2002	Curb Your Enthusiasm	Martine	Episode: "The Nanny from Hell"
2003	With You in Spirit	Montana	TV movie
2005	Stephen's Life	Principal Ainsley	TV movie
2008	Boston Legal	Martha Headly	Episode: "Kill, Baby, Kill"
2008–2010	The Life & Times of Tim	Blobsnark	2 episodes
2008–2012	Easy to Assemble	Gigi	4 episodes
2009	Sit Down, Shut Up	Helen Klench / Parrot (voices)	13 episodes
2010	Imagination Movers	Gladys	Episode: "Tooth Fairy"
2010	Glory Daze	Joel's Mother	Episode: "Pilot"
2010	Glenn Martin, DDS	Kristy	Episode: "Camp"
2012	Dan Vs.	Honey O'Houlihan (voice)	Episode: "The Cat Burglar"
2012	The New Normal	Carla	2 episodes
2012	RuPaul's Drag Race All Stars	Guest Judge	1 episode
2013	Jessie	Mrs. Falkenberg	Episode: "Teacher's Pest"
2013	Christmas in Conway	Gayle Matthews	TV movie
2014	Hot in Cleveland	Dr. Deb	Episode: "Bad George Clooney"
2014–2016	The 7D	Gingersnaps (voice)	2 episodes
2015	Comedy Bang! Bang!	Madeline Ferrari	Episode: "Weird Al Yankovic Wears a Different Hawaiian Shirt"
2015	Miles from Tomorrowland	Dibblex (voice)	Episode: "Unexpected Ally/Skyrise"
2015	The HOA	Montana Molone	TV movie
2015	Not Safe for Work	Misty Ridgeport	
2016	Bad Internet	The Rachel	Episode: "Which of the 'Friends' Are You?"
2016	Home: Adventures with Tip & Oh	Pauline Pappernacky	2 episodes
2016	Scream Queens	Sheila Baumgartner	Episode: "Handidates"
2016	Those Who Can't	Cathy Goodman	7 episodes
2016–2017	The Fairly OddParents	Connie Carmichael (voice)	5 episodes
2017–2023	Puppy Dog Pals	Esther / Mouse (voices)	62 episodes
2017	Bunsen Is a Beast	Miss Flapp (voice)	11 episodes
2018	9JKL	Patty	Episode: "Stalker Status"
2018	Animals	Nurse Deb (voice)	Episode: "Dogs. (2)"
2019	Crazy Ex-Girlfriend	Connie	Episode: "I'm Finding My Bliss"
2019	New Year's Eve Live	Barbara Walters	
2019–2025	Big City Greens	Gwendolyn Zapp (voice)	6 episodes
2020	The Boss Baby: Back in Business	Multi-Multi-Task CEO Baby (voice)	Episode: "Halloween"
2021	Scooby-Doo, Where Are You Now!	Lazlo the Mechanic	
2021–2022	Inside Job	Dupli-Kate (voice)	
2022	Mayans_M.C.	Piper	Episode: "Death of the Virgin"
2024	The Great North	Sherry	
2025	Mid-Century Modern	Denise Buckley	
2025	And Just Like That...	Sydney Cherkov	
2025	Haha, You Clowns	Brianne (voice)	Episode: "Call to the Battalion"
2025–present	Happy's Place	Monica	4 episodes
2026	The Bad Guys: The Series	Beverly (voice)	Episode: "I, Webs"
