= The Steve Allen Theater =

Theater in Hollywood, California, US

- Interactive map of The Steve Allen Theater
- Address: 4773 Hollywood Boulevard; Los Angeles, California; United States
- Coordinates: 34.1020°N 118.2942°W
- Owner: CFI

Construction
- Opened: 2003
- Closed: 2017
- Years active: 14
- Architect: Richard Ramer

Website
- steveallentheater.com

The Steve Allen Theater at the Center for Inquiry in Hollywood, California, was a 99-seat theater which was developed by founding artistic director Amit Itelman.

The Steve Allen Theater at the Center for Inquiry at 4773 Hollywood Boulevard moved to The Carl Sagan & Ann Druyan Theater, at 2535 West Temple Street, Los Angeles.

The Center for Inquiry is a nonprofit group founded by Carl Sagan and Isaac Asimov to promote science and secular humanism. When paranormal investigator James Underdown became the executive director of CFI West in 2003, he named the theater after Center for Inquiry supporter and television personality Steve Allen and offered Itelman an opportunity to define an artistic vision for the space.

According to the LA Weekly cover story Why Theater Matters - “Itelman has booked interdisciplinary acts (music, comedy and theater) that strike a particularly brainy and idiosyncratic chord." "A kind of theater that bounces off the walls." As described by the Los Angeles Times "Theater of the Absurd, Itelman's artistic credo reflects CFI's mission of 'not accepting things as they are' an unlikely lab for some of the freshest, strangest work in town...The bar for eccentricity may be pretty high in Hollywood, but the Steve Allen Theater clears it easily".

== Selected shows premiered and developed at the Steve Allen Theater ==
In an interview with director Jon Schnepp he states that Metalocalypse began with small sketches "like 'George Fisher (Cannibal Corpse vocalist) Goes to the Hospital' developed at The Steve Allen Theater.

Aye Jay Carny Trash - An exploration of the carnival underworld by carny Aye Jay. Directed by Amit Itelman.

The Beastly Bombing - Award-winning controversial Edwardian musical about fundamentalism. Book, lyrics and direction by Julien Nitzberg. Music by Roger Neill. Produced with Rorry Daniels. Toured to New York and Amsterdam.

Borcht Belt Babies - Vaudeville revival show featuring descendants of actual vaudeville stars. Hosted by Janet Klein. Directed by Amit Itelman

The Church of Satan’s Black Mass - The first ever public Satanic ritual on the 40th anniversary of Anton Lavey’s church. Directed by Amit Itelman

Cartoon Dump - Mystery Science Theater’s Frank Connif and film historian Jerry Beck’s variety show featuring the worst of animation history. Co-Hosted by Erica Doering.

Claire and Josh Hate Themselves but Love Each Other - written and starring Josh Fadem and Claire Tittleman.

Clown Town City Limits - The dark side of the clowns. Avante Guard Vaudeville. Written and performed by Jim Turner, Mark Fite and David Allen Gruber, Craig Anton. Written by Joel Madison, Dale Goodson and Bob Rucker. Directed by John Ferrara

Dueling Harps with Adam Dugas - Veteran performance artist Ann Magnuson shows featuring two classical harpists.

Hollywood Hellhouse - A two story haunted house which was the first time a Hell house was presented to a secular audience. Produced with Becky Thyre, Maggie Rowe and Joey Soloway. Directed by Maggie Rowe and Joey Soloway, haunted house directed by Amit Itelman. Inspired New York production a year later.

Mary Lynn Spreads Her Legs - Mary Lynn Rajskub dark comedy about postpartum depression. Directed by Amit Itelman.

Max Maven Thinking in Person, an Evening of Knowing and not Knowing - Mentalist Max Maven’s first full length show. Directed by Amit Itelman. Toured to Japan, and Europe.

Nevermore - Jeffrey Combs portrayal of Edgar Allan Poe. Written by Dennis Paoli. Directed by Stuart Gordon

Playing with Micucci - Kate Micucci in a one woman show featuring music, comedy and guest. Directed by Ron Lynch.

Re Animator the Musical - Cult hit based on Lovecraft lore featuring audience blood "splash zone". Directed by Stuart Gordon. Music lyrics by Mark Nutter. Book by Dennis Paoli, Stuart Gordon & William J. Morris. Produced by Dean Shramm

Resbox - Experimental music showcase curated by Hans Fjellestad.

The Secret World of Human Science - Multi-media variety show written and hosted by avant-garde filmmaker ZZalgern0n about odd science. Directed by Ron Lynch.

The Shredder - Comedian Emo Philips shreds jokes that don't get a laugh, never to perform them again.

Things We Don't Understand and Are Definitely Not Going To Talk About - Miranda July’s multi-media performance piece.

Tomorrow Show - Cult Midnight Comedy show originally hosted by Craig Anton, Ron Lynch and Brendon Small, then helmed by Ron Lynch. This staple of Los Angeles comedy launched Kate Micucci's career and features vignettes by the Doorknockers.

== Other notable performances ==
The Idiots - A Comedy about Watson and Crick launched the theater's first season. Written and Starring Ron Lynch and Craig Anton.

The Art of Bleeding – A night of experimental theater in which the audience experienced the sights and sounds of an actual medical emergency. Created and Produced by Al Ridenour. Special guests included Margaret Cho, Danny Shorago, Satanica, Los Ninos De La Tierra.

The Vampira Show – A Tribute Show and Fund Rasier hosted by Dana Gould for actress Maila Nurmi (Aka Vampira). Proceeds from the show went to a Fund to get Nurmi interred in Hollywood Forever Cemetery.

Eban Schletter’s Witching Hour – Eban Schletter, composer for the show SpongeBob SquarePants, put on a live version of his debut Halloween album Witching Hour. Starring Dave Foley, Paul F. Tompkins, Tom Kinney, Samm Levine, Grant Lee Phillips, Kris McGaha, Scott Aukerman and many more.

Girly Magazine Party – 1970s late night cable access show à la Playboy After Dark starring a plethora of rotating performers including Jim Turner, Mark Fite, Craig Anton, Music by Andy Paley, and many more.

The Rudy Casoni Variety Show – Rat Pack review hosted by Toby Huss. Music by Andy Paley & The Dago 5. Performers include Tom Lennon and Ben Garant, Billy the Mime, The Lampshades, Pat Healy, and Mark Fite.

Maja Doust – The self-proclaimed White Witch of Los Angeles, from the Philosophical Research Society, performed as an Oracle and answered audience questions about life, death, love, and the universe.

Supersmall – A benefit for "The 21st ChromosHome" project to help create a special needs community for people with Down syndrome. Performers included Peter Hayes (of the Black Rebel Motorcycle Club), The Lampshades, Two-Headed Dog, Erin Quigly, and many other contributors.

The Whitest Kids U' Know – The NY based Sketch Comedy group debuted their first feature film, The Civil War on Drugs.

Robochrist Industries - Christian Ristow and his maniacal misfits of metal and mayhem presented actual live Robotic warfare (actual giant mobile robots destroying stuff) in the parking lot at the Steve Allen.

For the Glory of Steel - The Society for Creative Anachronism brought a night of contact Medieval battle in full-on armor. With guest metal band, Crom.

The Car Plays – Moving Arts Theater Company presented fifteen ten-minute pieces in actual cars. Multiple directors included Moving Arts artistic producer Paul Nicolai Stein.

The Unholy Three - Magic cabaret trio featuring David Lovering, Rob Zabrecky, and Fitzgerald performed their exclusive Magic Castle mystery revue with live piano accompaniment by Brad Kay.

2 Headed Dog - a four-man comedy troupe based in Los Angeles, composed of comedians Jim Turner, Mark Fite, Craig Anton, and Dave Allen.

== The Kids in the Hall ==
The Steve Allen Theater is the Los Angeles home for The Kids in the Hall Canadian sketch comedy group. Multiple performances include their Reunion, Reading of Pilot Episode, Premier of Death Comes to Town, Premiere of Grand Guignol short, the Final Kiss starring Dave Foley and Scott Thompson and Directed by Amit Itelman. Solo shows by Bruce McCulloch, Kevin McDonald and Scott Thompson. The Tribute, a musical directed by Dave Foley.

== Selected screenings ==
Cronenberg Retrospective, featuring the Los Angeles premier of At the Suicide of the Last Jew in the World in the Last Cinema in the World. Horror Drive In Movie Series (Drive in technology by Eric Kurland of Hollywood MobMov) - Human Are Such Easy Prey drive-in, Masters of Horror drive-in, curated by Mick Garris.

== Lost screenings ==
Tobe Hooper’s lost first feature, Eggshells, An American Hippie in Israel, exploitation release of lost hippie film featured performance by Nashville garage band The Ettes.

== Selected music performances ==
Janet Klein - Naughty, lovely and obscure musical gems. Film historian Jerry Beck presents rare vintage 16mm short films to open the show. John Doe & Rancid – Founder of Legendary band X, John Doe, featuring an acoustic set with Rancid. Salty Songs and Gilded Gab – Rockabilly Legend, Phil Alvin (of The Blasters) & Marquis Howell (of Hobo Jazz & Janet Klein's Parlor Boys) present a night of acoustic roots music. Hollywood Hotshots – An evening of hot upstairs Jazz special guests have included Victoria Jackson and Seth MacFarlane. Soriah Tuvan throat singing and Indonesian Shadow Puppet Theater. The Bilgewater Brothers – Jug band Jazz performed by David Barlia and John Reynolds. Headless Hearsemen - Surf band black light performance of headless musicians. The Hermetic Order of the Golden Dawn - with Dave Lovering, Amit Itelman and Oscar Rey. Tulsa Skull Swingers – Stomp Surf band featuring Craig Anton, Blaine Capatch, Amit Itelman, Ron Lynch, and the Poubelle Twins. Faun Fables – Faun Fables is a psychedelic, folk band and performance art trio including Dawn McCarthy and Nils Frykdahl. Becky Stark – Lavender Diamond front woman variety show featured Miranda July, Josh Fadem, Ron Regé Jr., and more.

== Closure ==
In March 2017, the Center for Inquiry board announced it accepted an offer to sell the theater and surrounding property. The new owner announced its plan to demolish the current structures on the site and construct a housing complex. The last performance was a gala on November 3 called The Last Night of the Steve Allen Theater that featured approximately 20 performers who recreated scenes from previous productions.
