= Late Friday =

- Genre: Stand-up comedy
- Directed by: Ken Fuchs
- Theme music composer: Scott Fritz
- Opening theme: Scott Fritz
- Country of origin: United States
- Original language: English
- No. of seasons: 3
- No. of episodes: 44

Production
- Executive producers: Matt Kunitz; Lisa Leingang
- Producers: Lori Petitti (2001); Matthew B. Morgan; Bart Coleman (talent producer)
- Production locations: NBC Studios Burbank; Burbank, California; The Knitting Factory; Los Angeles, CA
- Camera setup: Multi-camera
- Running time: approx. 46 minutes
- Production companies: NBC Studios; Pulse Creative

Original release
- Network: NBC
- Release: January 5, 2001 – June 14, 2002

Related
- Friday Night Videos

Late Friday was a stand-up comedy series executive produced by Matt Kunitz and Lisa Leingang that aired Friday nights on NBC from 1:35am to 2:35am from January 5, 2001, to June 6, 2002. The show took over the timeslot from Friday Night, formerly titled Friday Night Videos. Featuring a revolving door of guest hosts, the Late Friday was a showcase for emerging standup comedians, alternative comedians, and sketch comedians. On May 13, 2002, NBC announced they had canceled the show to air Last Call With Carson Daly, which was previously airing Monday-Thursday, on Fridays, as well.

== Overview ==
The show was developed internally at NBC by Lisa Leingang, the network's Vice President of Comedy Development at NBC since 1998. Leingang had previosuly served as an HBO and MTV executive. Matt Kunitz, who had previously been a producer on MTV's The Real World served as executive producer via his company Pulse Creative. The show is based on the Largo Theater's "Mondays at Largo" showcase show where comedians would try new material, and many of the acts appearing on Late Friday were regulars at Largo. Largo owner/booker Mark Flanagan and the theater's staff received a "special thanks" in the end credits of every episode.

After the events of September 11, 2001, the show aired reruns for two weeks like most late night comedy shows, returning to air with a new episode on September 28th. In October of 2001, executive producer Lisa Leingang became an executive producer and showrunner on the rebooted version of NBC's Mon-Thurs 1:35am show, Later, with MTV VJ Carson Daly set to host. In the winter of 2002, during the show's third season, the show was pre-empted for a month due to NBC's coverage of the 2002 Winter Olympics. In the summer of 2002, NBC expanded Daly's show to Friday nights and canceled Late Friday.

Each episode featured a well-known stand-up comedian who performed an opening set then served as a host to introduce five up-and-coming comedians. Each comedian's set ran about five minutes. Early episodes taped at The Knitting Factory in Hollywood, California. before it moved to Studio 9 at NBC Studios in Burbank, California. Two episodes were taped at a time on Wednesday nights.

Many performers showcased early in their careers on Late Friday went on to fame and success as comedians and comedic actors, including Maria Bamford, Louis C.K., Jamie Kennedy, Al Madrigal, Marc Maron, Demetri Martin, Mary Lynn Rajskub, Retta, Craig Robinson, Nick Swardson, and future Saturday Night Live stars Fred Armisen, Finesse Mitchell, Jeff Richards, and Amy Poehler (who performed on the show with her sketch group Upright Citizens Brigade), and future Mad TV stars Frank Caliendo and Bobby Lee. During one of his two appearances, Armisen debuted his Latin nightclub drummer character Fericito, which would go on to become a recurring Saturday Night Live character.

== Series overview ==
Series	Episodes	Originally released	
Series	Episodes	First released	Last released
1	8	5 January 2001	9 March 2001
2	16	30 March 2001	12 October 2001
3	20	9 November 2001	14 June 2002

== Episodes ==
=== Season 1 (2001) ===
No. overall	No. in season	Episode title	Host(s)	Comedians	Original release date
1	1	#101	Paul F. Tompkins	Greg Fitzsimmons, Girls Guitar Club (Karen Kilgariff and Mary Lynn Rajskub), Jimmy Pardo, Greg Behrendt	5 January 2001
2	2	#102	Paul F. Tompkins	Craig Anton, Maria Bamford, Arj Barker, Nick Swardson	12 January 2001
3	3	#103	Greg Proops	Blaine Capatch, Chris Hardwick	19 January 2001
4	4	#104	Greg Proops	Doug Benson, Craig Robinson, Kevin Seccia, Fred Belford, The Sklar Brothers	26 January 2001
5	5	#106	Dana Gould	Todd Barry, Sarah Silverman, Mike Siegel, Price, Nash and Blieden (Matt Price, Jason Nash, and Michael Blieden), and Andy Kindler	2 February 2001
6	6	#105	Dana Gould	Brian Posehn, Dwayne Kennedy, The Upright Citizens Brigade (Matt Besser, Amy Poehler, Ian Roberts, Matt Walsh), Sean Cullen, and Mary Lynn Rajskub	23 February 2001
7	7	#107	Tom Kenny	Fred Belford, Vernon Chatman, Marc Maron	2 March 2001
8	8	#108	Tom Kenny	Fred Armisen, Louis C.K., Wayne Federman, Kevin Kataoka, Julia Sweeney	9 March 2001

=== Season 2 (2001) ===
No. overall	No. in season	Episode title	Host(s)	Comedians	Original release date
9	1	#201	Bobcat Goldthwait	Matt Weinhold, Brody Stevens, Jimmy Dore, Retta, Tom Agna	30 March 2001
10	2	#202	Bobcat Goldthwait	Judah Friedlander, Suli McCullough, David Feldman, Stephanie Courtney, Graham Elwood as Kent Stryker	6 April 2001
11	3	#203	Jeff Ross	Roman Danylo, Tess, T. Sean Shannon, Ian Bagg, Rick Overton	13 April 2001
12	4	#204	Jeff Ross	Jamie Kennedy, Candy Ford, Fred Armisen as Fericito, Nick Swardson, Scott Malone	27 April 2001
13	5	#205	The Sklar Brothers	Bil Dwyer, Eric Drysdale, Dave Anthony, Janine Ditullio, Derek Hughes	5 May 2001
14	6	#209	Kevin Nealon	Reno Collier, Tracy Smith, Doug Stanhope, Michael Blieden and Matt Price, Eric Tunney	11 May 2001
15	7	#210	Kevin Nealon	Finesse Mitchell, Laura Kightlinger, Gene Pompa, Howard Kremer, Tom Ryan	18 May 2001
16	8	#207	Jeff Garlin	Frank Caliendo, Demetri Martin, Sue Murphy, Doug Benson, Sean Conroy	8 June 2001
17	9	#208	Jeff Garlin	Greg Giraldo, Kathleen Madigan, Jeff Richards, The Ten Comedymandments (Paul Greenberg, Jackie Harris, Craig Anton), Greg Proops	15 June 2001
18	10	#206	The Sklar Brothers	Ralph Harris, Andy Blitz, Rachel Arieff, David Koechner as Jerry Prastis, Andrew Donnelly	20 July 2001
19	11	#211	Greg Behrendt	Mark Gross, Bobby Lee, Felicia Michaels, Chuck Roy, Blaine Capatch	27 July 2001
20	12	#212	Greg Behrendt	Tom Rhodes, Jackie Kashian, Ron Lynch, Marta Ravin, Paul F. Tompkins	10 August 2001
21	13	#213	Stella (Michael Ian Black, Michael Showalter, and David Wain)	Brian Dunkleman, Girls Guitar Club (Karen Kilgariff and Mary Lynn Rajskub), Mike Birbiglia, John Hope, Charles Deventer	17 August 2001
22	14	#216	Marc Maron	Frank Conniff, Joe Matarese, Tom Shillue	28 September 2001
23	15	#214	Stella (Michael Ian Black, Michael Showalter, and David Wain)	John Bush, Boris Hamilton, A.D. Miles as Marty Shonson, Danielle Koenig, Chip Pope	5 October 2001
24	16	#215	Marc Maron	Mitch Hedberg, Brian Kiley, Kyle Dunnigan, Merrill Markoe, Eugene Mirman	12 October 2001

=== Season 3 (2001-2002) ===
No. overall	No. in season	Episode title	Host(s)	Comedians	Original release date
25	1	#302	Dom Irrera	Brian Scolaro, Rebecca Corry, Paul Mercurio, Tom Clark, Corey Holcomb	9 November 2001
26	2	#303	Kevin Meaney	Kate Rigg, DeRay Davis, Jim Short, Cory Kahaney, Eric McMahon	16 November 2001
27	3	#304	Kevin Meaney	Jamie Lissow, Jane Edith Wilson, Tony Woods, Mick Betancourt, Greg Fitzsimmons	23 November 2001
28	4	#306	Joe Rogan	Buddy Bolton, David Edwards, M. Kirsch, Bryan Callen, Chuck Sklar	14 December 2001
29	5	#305	Joe Rogan	Freddy Soto, Jay London, Steve White, Mike Ricca, Bob Oschack	21 December 2001
30	6	TBA	TBA	Karen Anderson, Paul Gilmartin, Bonnie McFarlane, Jason Nash	28 December 2001
31	7	"#310"	Jimmy Pardo	Jon Reep, Rick Harris, Al Lubel, Leo Allen, Robert Mac	4 January 2002
32	8	"#311"	Jake Johannsen	Dwayne Kennedy, Henry Phillips, David J. Nash, Rena Zager	1 February 2002
33	9	"#307"	Guy Torry	Drew Hastings, Dwayne Perkins, Roger Rittenhouse, Becky Pedigo	1 March 2002
34	10	TBA	TBA	Mike Betancourt, Jamie Denbo, Todd Glass, Jerry Minor, Frank Santorelli	8 March 2002
35	11	TBA	TBA	Arj Barker, Mary Birdsong, Graham Elwood, Godfrey	5 April 2002
36	12	TBA	TBA	Maria Bamford, Anthony Griffith, Tom Kenny and Jill Talley	12 April 2002
37	13	"#315"	Seán Cullen (with Dylan Goodhue)	Ben Bailey, Aries Spears, Rich Vos, Tom Sharpe, Laura House	19 April 2002
38	14	TBA	TBA	John Fugelsang, Al Madrigal, Shaun Majumder, Laura Silverman, Two-Headed Dog (Dave (Gruber) Allen, Mark Fite, Jim Turner)	26 April 2002
39	15	TBA	TBA	Alonzo Bodden, Susan Messing, Jodie Milks, Mike Siegel	3 May 2002
40	16	TBA	TBA	Jennifer Courtney, Stephanie Courtney, John Heffron, Bryan Tucker	10 May 2002
41	17	TBA	TBA	Karen Anderson, Todd Barry, Matt Besser, Kjell Bjorgen, Emo Philips	17 May 2002
42	18	TBA	TBA	Suli McCullough, Bob Rubin, Muckafurgason (Chris Anderson, John Lee, Andrew Ure)	24 May 2002
43	19	"#320"	Andy Kindler	Craig Robinson, Demetri Martin, Mike Bent and Jimmy Dore, Christian Finnegan	14 June 2002

== Reception ==
The show's premiere episode was panned by The New York Post, who criticized the performances and material of that episode's batch of comedians.

== See also ==
- Friday Night Videos
