= Trepany House =

American arts organization

Coordinates: 34.10202°N 118.29390°W

- Interactive map of Trepany House
- Address: Formerly at 4773 Hollywood Boulevard; Los Angeles, California; United States

Construction
- Opened: 2012
- Years active: 2012-Current

Website
- trepanyhouse.org

Trepany House is an American non-profit arts organization. It was founded by Amit Itelman in 2012. From its inception, it has been housed at the Steve Allen Theater within the Center for Inquiry, Los Angeles property.

== Founding ==
Amit Itelman was the founding artistic director for the newly built Steve Allen Theater in 2003. In 2012, Amit Itelman founded Trepany House as a 501(c)3 Arts Organization, using the same Steve Allen Theater from CFI Los Angeles for performances. Underground Comic artist Robert Crumb designed the Trepany House logo. Productions are a rotation of comedy, variety, music, magic, theatre, curiosities, and horror. LA Weekly wrote that- “Trepany has been a hub for subversive ideas and performance”, Time Out stated- “fantastic, oddball shows… A true gem”, according to Boing Boing- “Trepany House consistently hosts the best performers and shows in Los Angeles”.

Trepany House was in residence at the Steve Allen Theater until 2017. Trepany House now exists as an Arts Organization without a permanent residence.

The Kids in the Hall, 2HeadedDog, Brendon Small, Ann Magnuson, Re-Animator the Musical, Nevermore, Kate Micucci, Rob Zabrecky, Janet Klein, and Ron Lynch’s Tomorrow! had Steve Allen Theater residences with Trepany House presenting.

== Shows premiered and developed at Trepany House ==
- Force Majeure - Eddie Izzard’s one man show, 11 show run. The tour went on to perform in 45 countries and all 50 U.S. States.
- FleischerFest - A full day of Fleischer cartoon’s, Fleischer themed performance, and a costume contest. Animation historian Jerry Beck interviewed Mark Fleischer, Janet Klein led a sing a long, and Puddles Pity Party performed.
- The Top Secret Brendon Small Experiment. The show starring Brendon Small, is a staged sitcom, where every week is a different episode.
- Re-Animator:The Musical
- The Birthday Boys - Sketch Comedy show directed by Bob Odenkirk which was turned into a series on IFC.
- Puppetzilla Puppet Slam Puppetzilla- The LA Puppet Guild’s recurring Puppetslam which featured experimental puppet performances."
- Mel Gordon Mondo Lectures - University of California, Berkeley Professor Mel Gordon’s numerous lectures including Sex Magic and the Occult; Erik Jan Hanussen, Hitler’s Jewish Clairvoyant; Anita Berber, the Dancer of Depravity, and more.
- With Bob and David - Mr. Show reunion to workshop material for Netflix’s With Bob and Dave, featuring Bob Odenkirk and David Cross.(33)
- Firesign Theatre’s 50th Anniversary - With Firesign Theatre founders David Ossman and Philip Proctor. (34)
- Night Talk - A sex positive talk show hosted by Martin Starr, with guests Mike Judge and Paul Scheer.
- For Drummers Only - Joe Wong’s Trap Set and Fred Armisen’s comedy show devoted to drumming. Guests included Clem Burke from Blondie and Jack Black.
- The Secret History of Gwar - Performance and presentation by Hunter Jackson, Techno Destructo from Gwar.
- The Occult Origins of Wonder Woman - A multi media presentation exploring the mythology and occult references present in the Wonder Woman cannon, by Maja D’Oust and Ron Rege Jr.

== Selected stand up comedy ==
Bill Burr, Laura Kightlinger, and Marc Maron developed material in many full-length show residences. Maron also recorded List of WTF with Marc Maron episodes. Jerrod Carmichael performed full-length shows, including the Carmichael Show live, performing alongside Tiffany Haddish and David Alan Grier.

== Selected screenings ==
The Shining Backwards and Forwards, screening the Shining superimposed by the Shining running in reverse; conceived by John Fell Ryan. The Nightmare with a sleep paralysis panel featuring director Rodney Ascher and Sleep Paralysis Expert Dr. Brian Sharpless; Metropolis with a live score; Eggshells & The Texas Chainsaw Massacre, with the Tobe Hooper Appreciation Panel featuring Mick Garris, Stuart Gordon, and John Landis.
