= Trashed (game show) =

- Genre: Game show
- Presented by: Chris Hardwick
- Country of origin: United States
- Original language: English
- No. of episodes: 50

Production
- Running time: 30 minutes

Original release
- Network: MTV
- Release: February 14 – July 23, 1994

Trashed is a television game show that ran on MTV from February 14 to July 23, 1994, with Chris Hardwick as host.

== Premise ==
Two teams of two players each competed in a junk-filled studio to answer questions based on music videos and pop culture. Each team brought six treasured items from home, three per player, and risked having them destroyed ("trashed") if they performed poorly in the game.

== Main game ==
=== Rounds 1 and 2 ===
At the start of Round 1, each team put three items at risk and Hardwick asked a toss-up question to establish initial control, with no points at stake. The team that won control chose one of their opponents' items; Hardwick then announced a category and asked three toss-up questions worth 50 points each. The challenged team had to answer two questions correctly in order to save the item; if they failed to do so, it was trashed in full view of them and the audience. If the same team won the first two questions, the third one was discarded and the item's fate was immediately decided. The team that won the category took/kept control and chose one of their opponents' items.

The round ended after two categories had been played. Round 2 was played under the same rules, with each question now worth 100 points. Each team's remaining three items were put at risk, and the team that won the second category of Round 1 had initial control. Throughout both rounds, no individual item could be put at risk more than once.

==== Categories ====
Categories typically dealt with pop culture, music videos, or random trivia. On occasion, a skit would be presented, after which the contestants would have to answer questions about the skit or from the performers themselves. Examples of categories included "The Naked Trucker" and "Where in the Hell is Mayim Bialik?" (a satire of the computer game/game show, Where in the World is Carmen Sandiego?).

==== Trashing ====
When an item was to be trashed, plexiglass shields were put in place to protect the teams and audience from flying debris and Mark Fite (referred to as "Mark the Trasher") carried out the destruction, occasionally assisted by show model/announcer Andrea Wagner. Methods of trashing included crushing, detonation, irreparable defacement, and cutting to pieces. If the intended trashing failed to destroy the item to Fite's satisfaction, he would finish the job by smashing it with a sledgehammer.

=== Survival round ===
One member of each team put herself or himself at risk of being trashed, while their partners answered 150-point toss-up questions for 39 seconds. Every question could be answered with one of three similar-sounding choices listed by Hardwick, such as "C. Everett Koop", "C. Thomas Howell", and "C. B. DeMille". When time ran out, the higher-scoring team won a prize and advanced to the bonus round, while the at-risk contestant on the losing team was subjected to a messy and/or humiliating punishment. The losers received a cheap, tacky parting gift (such as a Simpsons chess set) and were also required to do 10 hours of community service.

== Bonus round ==
The winners sat face to face, each with three television screens placed behind him/her on which music videos were playing. They alternated roles, one player describing a video and the other trying to guess the band in it, and won a grand prize if they solved all six before time ran out. The clock was set to 30 seconds, plus five more for every one of the team's items that had not been trashed, for a maximum of 60 seconds. Players were not allowed to name any band members, albums or songs; use any part of the band name; sing, hum, or whistle any part of a song; or recite any lyrics. The style of the endgame and the rules of the bonus round are similar to "The Winners Circle" on Pyramid.

== Ongoing gags/jokes ==
Trashed had several ongoing comedy bits that were emphasized, usually involving the trash theme and/or humiliating the contestants. These included:

- Frequent use of the word "loser," such as when a team missed a question or an illegal clue was given in the bonus round.
- Frequent use of bathroom or sexual humor.
- Before the bonus round began, the rules were read aloud at high speed and scrolled past the screen, and an address was displayed for viewers to write in if they wanted a copy.
- If a team won the bonus round, Fite would shoot confetti at them from a modified leaf blower. He later began shooting other random small objects at the winners, and finally began to do this whether the team won the grand prize or not.
- Wagner would tell Mark the Trasher that a famous person is jumping off a ledge or a high object, like "Eddie Vedder is jumping off a ledge again." The scene would cut to a music video of the star jumping off the ledge. A weighted mannequin would fall from the ceiling, trashing the object.

== Additional notes ==
Comedians Brian Posehn, Doug Benson, Chris Henchy, Dave "Gruber" Allen, Steve Higgins, David Anthony Higgins and Joel Hodgson were on the writing staff and occasionally performed skits during the first two rounds.

The show used different scoring displays for each team: a yellow podium with an eggcrate display for one, a purple podium with a vane display for the other. The timer for the Survival Round and bonus round had an eggcrate display and was attached to a platform above the stage, where Wagner stepped on a foot pedal to activate it.
