= Zadar! Cow from Hell =

- Directed by: Robert C. Hughes
- Written by: Merle Kessler
- Produced by: Steve Baker; Scott Smith; Robert Hughes; Tom Higgins
- Starring: Toby Huss; Jim Turner
- Release date: 1989
- Running time: 87 minutes

Zadar! Cow from Hell is an independent, low-budget comedy film directed by Robert C. Hughes.

The film was released in 1989 and shown in select theaters, mostly located in eastern Iowa. In a two night theatrical run, the film grossed over $25,000. It also premiered at the Sundance Film Festival.

The film was written by and cast with members of the Duck's Breath Mystery Theater, a comic acting troupe. Merle Kessler's idea for the film was inspired by Zarda Dairy in the Kansas City area that had a statue of a giant cow. The film was shot in and around Iowa City, Tipton, Solon and Mount Vernon, Iowa.

The plot of the movie revolves around a struggling Hollywood director who wished to return to his home state of Iowa and create a successful horror film. However, upon arriving in Iowa, the young director (played by Merle Kessler) is immediately distracted by old friends and family, a problem which will plague him throughout the making of his film, Zadar! Cow from Hell.

One of the film locations was shot in a Victorian home at 203 S. Iowa St. in Solon, Iowa. It was home to the Lundquist family at the time the father David was Mayor of the town. He lived there with his wife Leslie & three boys Michael, Adam and Daniel (who had a brief appearance in the film) they had a great time with much the film crew plus actors camping in their yard. For them it was like Hollywood coming to a very small town. It was very exciting at the time for all in the town.

The film within a film is sprinkled with bits of humor, usually consisting of short one-liners. However, the film's defining moment comes when the individuals meant to be playing cows realize that they cannot remove the plastic horns from their heads. This causes chaos and frustration, and is later linked with the demise of the project.

Zadar! Cow from Hell was eventually released on VHS and DVD, although not through a major distribution network. The film also gained attention from outside the movie-going community, eventually even having a meal named after it at the Hamburg Inn No. 2, a local diner. There, the "Zadar" omelette consists of two eggs, ground beef, cheese, and homefries. There is also a reference to the movie in the role-playing video game Neverwinter Nights, in which a cheat that summons killer cows is entered by typing "dm_cowsfromhell".

== Complete Credited Cast ==
- Bill Allard - Mr. Nifty
- Dan Coffey - Rex
- Harry J. Epstein - Angry Cow
- Bill Gerlits - Mayor
- Deborah Gwinn - Amy Walker
- Ned Holbrook - Chip
- John Horan - Boy in Crowd
- Robert C. Hughes - Director
- Toby Huss - Clerk
- Glen Jackson - Whitey the 2nd Clerk
- Merle Kessler - Sleepless Walker
- Daniel Lundquist - Boy with the balloon
- Leon Martell - Dan Tension
- Paul Neff - Feed Cap Guy
- Oak O'Connor - Line Producer - production manager
- Ben Rollins - Protester
- Eric Topham - Ralph Jr.
- Jim Turner - Max
