= Roxanne Beckford =

American actress

- Born: November 17, 1969 (age 55); Kingston, Jamaica
- Other names: Roxanne Beckford-Hoge
- Occupations: Film; television actress; producer
- Years active: 1991–present
- Spouse: Bob Hoge (1996–present)
- Children: 4

Roxanne Beckford-Hoge (born November 17, 1969) is a Jamaican-born American actress.

== Career ==
She has acted in numerous television series and played minor roles in films, including Bewitched (2005) Something's Gotta Give (2003), and Father of the Bride Part II (1995). Beckford began her career in acting as a child in Jamaica in a radio play and starred in a television commercial for Fab laundry detergent. Her husband, Bob Hoge, is also an actor. They have four children, including twins who were featured on episode one of TLC's Bringing Home Baby in 2005.

== Personal life ==
Beckford married actor/writer/director Bob Hoge in 1996. Her husband also runs a maternity business. When she appeared on the TLC Channel reality series Bringing Home Baby with her husband in 2005, Beckford had just given birth to their twins.

== Filmography ==
=== Film/Movie ===
Year	Title	Role	Notes
1991	The Linguini Incident	Lanie	
1994	Frogmen		TV movie
1995	Father of the Bride II	Nina's Nurse	
1996	After Jimmy	Sabine	TV movie
1997	Odd Jobs		TV movie
1998	Marry Me or Die	Barbie	
1999	Love American Style	Jill	TV movie
2002	Mind Games	Linda	
2003	Something's Gotta Give	Harry's Hamptons nurse	
2005	Bewitched	Francine	
2008	Baby Fighting	Valerie Johnson-Cruz	Short

=== Television ===
Year	Title	Role	Notes
1992	A Different World	Courtney	Episode: "Save the Best for Last: Part 1 & 2"
1992	Parker Lewis Can't Lose	Christa	Episode: "Flamingo Graffiti"
1992	The Fresh Prince of Bel-Air	Bride	Episode: "Mama's Baby, Carlton's Maybe"
1992	Herman's Head	Susan Bracken	Episode: "The 'C' Word"
1993	Hangin' with Mr. Cooper	Teresa	Episode: "Forbidden Fruit"
1993	Where I Live	Yvette	Episode: "Dontay's Inferno"
1993	Townsend Television	Various Roles	Main cast
1994	The Sinbad Show	Producer	Episode: "The Mr. Science Show"
1995	The Parent 'Hood	Mindy	Episode: "The Rake, the Fake and Gopher Snake"
1995	Living Single	Melissa	Episode: "Stormy Weather"
1995	Pointman	Sperry Fontaine	Episode: "Silent Auction"
1995	First Time Out	Madeline	Main cast
1995	The Wayans Bros.	Charlene	Episode: "It's Shawn! It's Marlon! It's Superboys!"
1995–96	Almost Perfect	Roxy / Sheri	Episode: "I'm Gregory Peck" & "Auto Neurotic"
1995–96	Teenage Mutant Ninja Turtles	Merrik (voice)	Guest: season 9, recurring cast: season 10
1996	Gargoyles	Tea / Beth Maza (voice)	Episode: "Mark of the Panther" & "Cloud Fathers"
1996	Diagnosis: Murder	Sylvana Kent	Episode: "Mind Over Murder"
1996	The Wayans Bros.	Stacey	Episode: "It Takes a Thief" & "Mama, I Wanna Act"
1996–97	Goode Behavior	Parole Officer Gunton	Recurring cast
1997	Smart Guy	Perkins	Episode: "Working Guy"
1998	For Your Love	Tina	Episode: "The Cuckoo's Nest"
1999	The Hughleys	Stacy Mills	Episode: "Reliving Single"
1999	Becker	Francine	Episode: "Physician, Heal Thyself"
1999	The Steve Harvey Show	Simone Dupri	Episode: "Boomerang"
2002	Yes, Dear	Nurse	Episode: "We're Having a Baby"
2003	CSI: Crime Scene Investigation	Marlene Mitchell	Episode: "Coming of Rage"
2004	Dr. Vegas	Karen	Episode: "Limits"
2005	Half & Half	Angela	Episode: "The Big Thorne in My Side Episode"
2005	Inconceivable	Mrs. Ryan	Episode: "The Last Straw"
2005	The Bernie Mac Show	Pregnant Woman	Episode: "Some Church Bull"
2006	According to Jim	Woman	Episode: "Mr. Right"
2006	In Justice	Jada Hamilton	Episode: "Victims"
2006	Dexter	Reporter Candice DeSallee	Episode: "Crocodile" & "Seeing Red"
2007	Side Order of Life	Waitress	Episode: "Pilot"
2008	Leverage	Doctor Kester	Episode: "The Miracle Job"
2009	Criminal Minds	Medical Examiner	Episode: "Cold Comfort"
2009	Hannah Montana	Clementine	Episode: "Welcome to the Bungle"
2009	The Secret Life of the American Teenager	Female Neighbor	Episode: "Crampt"
2009	The New Adventures of Old Christine	Gym Member	Episode: "Old Christine Meets Young Frankenstein"
2009	Men of a Certain Age	Mom #2	Episode: "The New Guy"
2010	The Defenders	Foreman	Episode: "Las Vegas vs. Johnson"
2011	Conan	Jacqueline Kennedy Onassis	Episode: "Damn the Torpedoes, Full Greed Ahead"
2011	Make It or Break It	Healthy Bar Rep #2	Episode: "Worlds Apart" & "What Lies Beneath"
2012	Ringer	Doctor	Episode: "It's Called Improvising, Bitch!"
2014	Pretty Little Liars	Substitute Teacher	Episode: "She's Come Undone"
2015	Bad Judge	Defense Attorney #1	Episode: "Case Closed"
2015	CSI: Cyber	Isabella	Episode: "URL, Interrupted"
2016	Shameless	Dr. Pau	Episode: "NSFW"
2020	SEAL Team	American Ambassador	Episode: "The New Normal"

=== Video games ===
Year	Title	Role	Notes
2012	Diablo III	Additional Voices	
2014	Diablo III: Reaper of Souls	Additional Voices	
