= First Time Out =

American sitcom

- Genre: Sitcom
- Created by: Shawn Schepps; Diane Wilk
- Starring: Jackie Guerra; Leah Remini; Craig Anton; Tracy Vilar; Roxanne Beckford; Mia Cottet; Harry Van Gorkum
- Theme music composer: John Benitez; Ed Terry
- Composer: Matt Ender
- Country of origin: United States
- Original language: English
- No. of seasons: 1
- No. of episodes: 16 (4 unaired)

Production
- Executive producers: Marc Sotkin; Jon Spector
- Producer: Gail Parent
- Camera setup: Multi-camera
- Running time: 30 minutes
- Production company: Columbia Pictures Television

Original release
- Network: The WB
- Release: September 10 – December 17, 1995

First Time Out is an American sitcom television series that aired on The WB. Originally holding the working title Girlfriends and described as a "Latino Living Single", the series premiered on September 10, 1995, and last aired an original episode on December 17, 1995, after which time it was put on hiatus by The WB, leaving four episodes unaired.

== Plot ==
The sitcom followed Jackie (Guerra), a Yale University graduate who now has a trendy hair salon in Los Angeles, California, attends law-school classes at night, and longs to find a man. She shares an apartment with her friends Dominique (Leah Remini), a cynical assistant at Ventura Records, and Susan (Mia Cottet), who's about to get her psychotherapist license and is neurotic herself. She's good friends with her co-workers at the salon, Rosa (Tracy Vilar) and Freddy (Harry Van Gorkum), an obnoxious, womanizing English hairstylist. Rounding out the cast are Madeline (Roxanne Beckford), a yuppie executive who lives across the hall, and Nathan (Craig Anton), Jackie's klutzy, sex-obsessed childhood friend.

== Cast ==
- Jackie Guerra as Jackie
- Leah Remini as Dominique Constellano
- Tracy Vilar as Rosa
- Roxanne Beckford as Madeline
- Mia Cottet as Susan
- Craig Anton as Nathan
- Harry Van Gorkum as Freddy

== Episodes ==
Only 12 episodes of First Time Out aired on The WB. 4 episodes were still unaired.

No.	Title	Directed by	Written by	Original release date	US viewers (millions)
1	"Pilot"	Shelley Jensen	Story by : Shawn Schepps; Teleplay by : Shawn Schepps & Diane Wilk	September 10, 1995	2.1
2	"Traditions"	Judy Pioli	Roger Garrett	September 17, 1995	N/A
3	"Money Sucks"	Unknown	Unknown	September 24, 1995	2.1
4	"It's Not My Fault"	Unknown	Unknown	October 1, 1995	1.7
5	"Jackie & The New Super Show"	Unknown	Unknown	October 8, 1995	2.1
6	"The Sale Show"	Judy Pioli	Marc Sotkin & Judy Pioli	October 15, 1995	2.9
7	"Every Pot Has Its Cover"	Unknown	Unknown	October 29, 1995	2.7
8	"Always a Bridesmaid"	Unknown	Unknown	November 5, 1995	1.6
9	"Extra, Extra"	Unknown	Unknown	November 12, 1995	3.8
10	"The Platonic Friend Show"	Unknown	Unknown	November 19, 1995	2.4
11	"The Tattoo Show"	Unknown	Unknown	November 26, 1995	1.7
12	"O Christmas Tree"	Unknown	Unknown	December 17, 1995	2.1
13	"The Spa Show"	N/A	N/A	Unaired	N/A
14	"All or Nothing"	N/A	N/A	Unaired	N/A
15	"Pulp Fiction"	N/A	N/A	Unaired	N/A
16	"Psyched Out"	Scott Baio	Cheryl Holliday	Unaired	N/A
