= 2 Headed Dog =

Four-man comedy troupe

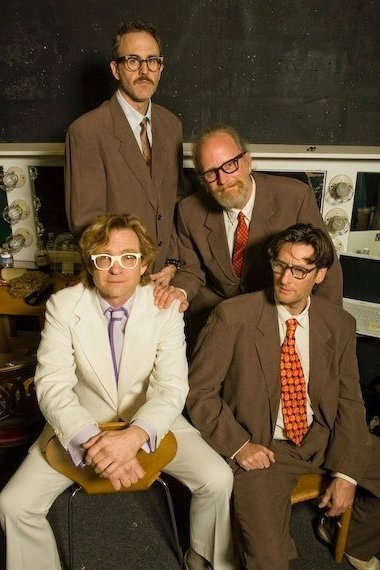
2 Headed Dog.

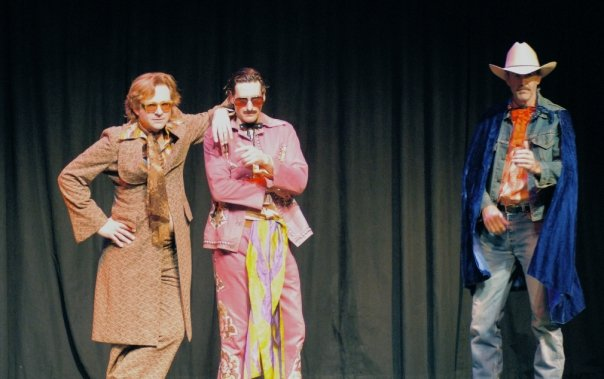
2 Headed Dog. San Francisco SketchFest.

2 Headed Dog is a four-man comedy troupe based in Los Angeles, composed of comedians Jim Turner, Mark Fite, Craig Anton, and Dave Allen.

The Steve Allen Theater served as the troupe's home base, where they performed regularly until the theater closed. The group has appeared at numerous comedy clubs and festivals such as Festival Supreme over the years, as well as repeat performances at Lucha VaVOOM and the Brookledge Follies.

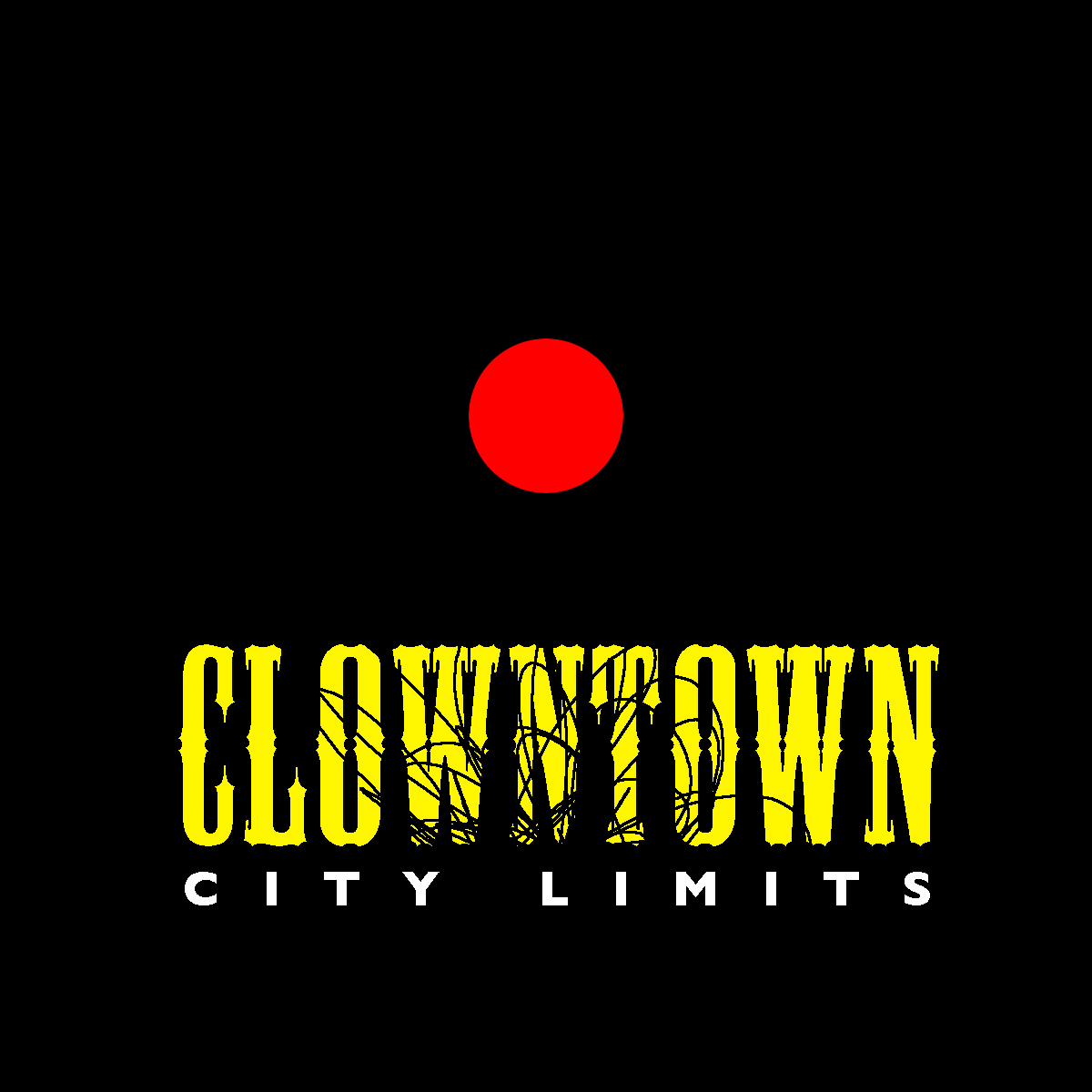
Clowntown City Limits. Written & performed by 2 Headed Dog. Music by Andy Paley. Logo by Ed Rachles.

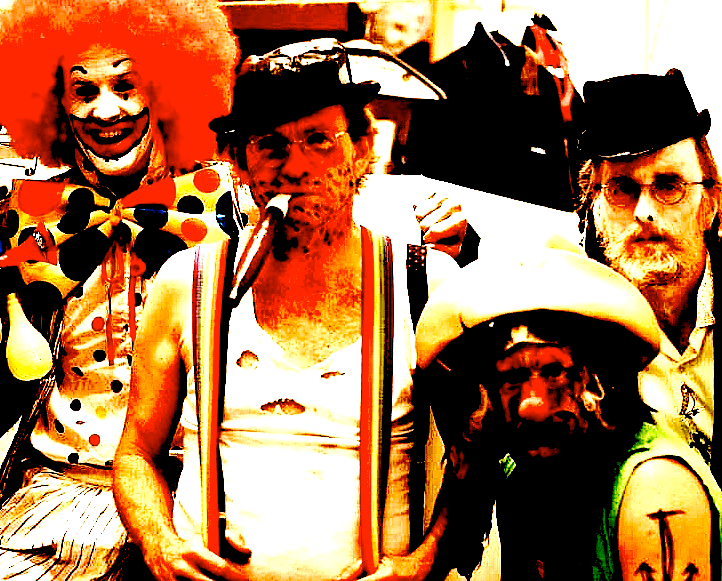
Craig Anton, Jim Turner, Mark Fite, Dave 'Gruber' Allen.

== Clowntown City Limits ==
2 Headed Dog performed the comedic theatre piece Clowntown City Limits, about four down-and-out clowns, many times. It was written by the troupe, with additional material by Joel Madison, Dale Goodson, and Bob Rucker; with music by Andy Paley, and directed by John Ferraro.

Clowntown City Limits was described by LA Weekly as "ravishingly brilliant ... as funny and pointless and circuitous as life on the margins", and was still playing well three years later, described then as "hysterically imbecilic repartee" tinged with "a loathing resentment".
