= Craig Anton =

American actor and comedian (born 1962)

- Born: Craig Ward Anton; August 28, 1962 (age 64); Omaha, Nebraska, U.S.
- Occupations: Actor, comedian
- Years active: 1989–present
- Spouse: Lesley Gray (m. 1994)
- Children: 2

Craig Ward Anton (born August 28, 1962) is an American actor and comedian. He is best known for his roles as Mr. Pettus in Lizzie McGuire and Lloyd Diffy in Phil of the Future.

== Early life ==
Anton was born and raised in Omaha, Nebraska, the eldest son of Antoinette (Akromis) and Arthur Ward Anton. He has a younger brother, Brian, and two sisters, Toni and Megan. Anton graduated from Omaha Burke High School in 1980, and the University of Nebraska–Lincoln in 1996.

== Career ==
Anton started acting as a kid in Omaha, Nebraska and made his career as a stand-up comedian at age 17, performing in comedy clubs in 1978 while in high school. He attended the University of Nebraska–Lincoln and graduated in 1983 with a B.A. in Theater and English. Anton began his career as a college circuit comedian in the 1980s. In 1984, he traveled the Mediterranean and Middle East as part of an all-comedy USO tour, spending two months in Turkey, Greece, Bahrain, Italy, Israel and Spain entertaining troops. In 1985, he was named Showtime's Funniest Person in Nebraska. In the late 1980s, Anton moved to New York City and pursued some acting opportunities, then moved to Los Angeles. He currently teaches at SCAD in Savannah, Georgia.

=== 2 Headed Dog ===
He is a member of comedy group 2 Headed Dog with comedians Jim Turner, Mark Fite, and Dave (Gruber) Allen.

=== First Time Out and MADtv ===
In the fall of 1995, Anton booked two TV pilots in Los Angeles. He was cast as Nathan in The WB sitcom First Time Out which premiered in September and was later cast on the FOX sketch comedy series MADtv in October. Anton's other show First Time Out was quickly cancelled two months after the premiere of MADtv. His most enduring character was Clorox from the "Star Trek: Deep Stain Nine" sketches. Clorox was supposed to be the main nemesis of the sketch and he was loosely based on Q from Star Trek. He impersonated Dennis Miller and Nate Richert before leaving the show in 1998 at the end of the third season.

=== Other television projects ===
Since leaving MADtv, Anton developed an extensive resume on television. He has made appearances on such television series as Mr. Show with Bob and David, Coach, Boston Legal, Entourage, Curb Your Enthusiasm, The King of Queens, Ally McBeal, Lizzie McGuire, Phil of the Future, Everybody Loves Raymond, Weekends at the D.L., 2 Broke Girls, and Mad Men. After leaving MADtv Craig was cast as Mr. Pettus in Lizzie McGuire. After Season 1 ended Craig Anton left the show. He was eventually cast as Lloyd Diffy in Phil of the Future.

=== Film projects ===
Anton has appeared in such films as Mail Bonding (1995), Deliver Us From Eva (2003), The Goldfish (2003), Run Ronnie Run (2002), D-WAR (2005), and Careless (2007). He also took part in the feature film is The Mother of Invention (2010).

=== Voice acting projects ===
In 2004, Anton starred in the animated series Tom Goes to the Mayor. He provided the voice (and body) of one of the city council members.

=== Tomorrow Show ===
Along with comedians Ron Lynch and Brendon Small, Craig hosted the Tomorrow Show, a weekly live comedy show at the Steve Allen Theater in Los Angeles, California. Though Anton and Small are no longer actively involved with the show the two occasionally make surprise appearances including a yearly anniversary performance.

== Personal life ==
Anton married Lesley Gray in September 1994. They have twin daughters, Delphine and Ruby. They currently live in Savannah, Georgia.

== Filmography ==
=== Film ===
Year	Title	Role	Notes
1993	Ice Cream	Man	Short film
1995	Mail Bonding	Poet	
2002	Run Ronnie Run	Hollywood Agent	
2003	Deliver Us From Eva	Theo Wilson	
2003	The Goldfish	Duncan Poole	
2005	D-WAR	Dr. Austin	
2007	Careless	Officer Bill	
2010	The Mother of Invention	James Gilmore	
2017	Jigsaw	Bad Dad	
2022	The Bob's Burgers Movie	Mr. Dowling	Voice role
2025	Bride Hard	Mark	

=== Television ===
Year	Title	Role	Notes
1995–1998	First Time Out	Nathan	
1995–1998	MADtv	Various Characters	Sketch Comedy
1995	Mr. Show with Bob and David	Expert Truck (voice)	
1996	Coach	Brian	
1998	Driven to Drink	The Bartender	
1998	The Army Show	Lt. Branford Handy	
1999	Random Play	Various Roles	
2000	Curb Your Enthusiasm	Craig	Season 1, Episode 8 ("Beloved Aunt")
2001	Lizzie McGuire	Mr. Pettus	
2001	Late Friday	Himself	
2001	Ally McBeal	Roger Clayton	
2001	Primetime Glick	Various Characters	
2001–2005	The King of Queens	As Mitch in "Package Deal" (Season 3), and Neal Berger in "Awed Couple" (Season 7)	
2002	Everybody Loves Raymond	Neil	
2002	Live From Baghdad	American Hostage #2	
2003	Lucky	Unknown	
2004	Tom Goes to the Mayor	City Council Member/Various (voices)	
2005	Weekends at the DL	Winston Sicklebee	
2006	Boston Legal	Ray Richardson	
2006	The Office	Craig	Episode: "Valentine's Day"
2004–2006	Phil of the Future	Lloyd Diffy	
2010	True Jackson VP	Snackleberry Junction Chef	
2010	Workaholics	Bart	
2012–2023	Bob's Burgers	Mr. Dowling (voice)	4 episodes
2013	Mad Men	Frank Gleason	
2014	The Middle	Bob Branderson	
2014–2015	Comedy Bang! Bang!	Roger Tamblin and Canadian Prime Minister Pierre Mooselager	2 episodes
2016	Walk the Prank	Doug	1 episode
2022	The Girl from Plainville	Samuel Sutter	2 episodes
