= Bewitched (2005 film) =

- Theatrical release poster
- Directed by: Nora Ephron
- Written by: Nora Ephron; Delia Ephron
- Based on: Bewitched by Sol Saks
- Produced by: Nora Ephron; Douglas Wick; Lucy Fisher; Penny Marshall
- Starring: Nicole Kidman; Will Ferrell; Shirley MacLaine; Michael Caine; Jason Schwartzman; Kristin Chenoweth; Heather Burns; Jim Turner; Stephen Colbert; David Alan Grier; Steve Carell
- Cinematography: John Lindley
- Edited by: Tia Nolan
- Music by: George Fenton
- Production companies: Columbia Pictures; Red Wagon Entertainment
- Distributed by: Sony Pictures Releasing
- Release date: June 24, 2005
- Running time: 102 minutes
- Country: United States
- Language: English
- Budget: $85 million
- Box office: $131.4 million

Bewitched is a 2005 American fantasy romantic comedy film co-written, co-produced, and directed by Nora Ephron, and starring Nicole Kidman and Will Ferrell alongside an ensemble cast featuring Shirley MacLaine, Michael Caine, Jason Schwartzman, Kristin Chenoweth (in her film debut), Heather Burns, Jim Turner, Stephen Colbert, David Alan Grier, Michael Badalucco, Carole Shelley, and Steve Carell. The film follows an actor (Ferrell) who discovers, while filming the remake of Bewitched, that his co-star (Kidman) is an actual witch.

Produced by Red Wagon Entertainment and distributed by Sony Pictures Releasing through its Columbia Pictures label, the film is a re-imagining of the television series of the same title (produced by Columbia's Screen Gems television studio, now Sony Pictures Television). Bewitched opened theatrically on June 24, 2005, to unfavorable reviews and failed to meet expectations at the box office.

== Plot ==
Jack Wyatt is a narcissistic actor who is approached to play Darrin in a remake of the sitcom Bewitched, but insists that an unknown play Samantha. Isabel Bigelow is an actual witch who decides she wants to be normal and moves to Los Angeles to start a new life and becomes friends with her neighbor Maria. She goes to a bookstore to learn how to get a job after seeing an advertisement of Ed McMahon on television. Jack happens to be at the same bookstore after attending some failed Samantha auditions. Jack spots Isabel and persuades her to audition. At the same time, while she tries to settle into her new life, Isabel's intrusive father Nigel keeps appearing to convince her to return home.

After Isabel impresses the show's producers and writers, Jack finally convinces Isabel to join the show. Also joining the show is legendary actress Iris Smythson, as Endora. After a successful taping of the pilot, Isabel happens to overhear a conversation between Jack and his agent Ritchie about how they tricked Isabel into appearing without having any lines. Furious, Isabel storms off with Nina and her new neighbor friend Maria. She sees she has three choices: quit, get mad, or live with it. Instead, Isabel's Aunt Clara visits and aids Isabel in casting a love spell on Jack. At the same time, Nigel is introduced to Iris and becomes infatuated with her.

The hex works and Jack becomes lovestruck by Isabel, insisting on several script changes to give her some dialogue and jokes, ignoring statements from test groups preferring Isabel over him. Jack's affection for Isabel grows and he asks her out on a date, making Isabel forget about the hex. But when he brings her home, she remembers and reverses it back to when she and Aunt Clara cast it. The next day, rather than the events the hex presented, Jack is outraged by the scores he received and takes his anger out on Isabel, who lashes back at him. Ritchie fires her, and she storms off.

Rather than be angry at her, Jack is fascinated with Isabel and chases after her, accepting all her comments. After another taping (with Isabel having dialogue), their romance blossoms. But the next day, Jack's estranged wife Sheila arrives, determined to woo Jack back. Isabel sees this and casts a spell on her, making her sign the divorce papers and having her decide to move to Iceland. Jack, thrilled, announces he will be throwing a party at his house, to celebrate the divorce.

Nigel attends the party with Iris and when Nigel begins flirting with much younger guests, Iris reveals that she is also a witch and casts a spell on each girl. When Jack makes a toast stating that the truth will be revealed to everyone, Isabel decides to tell Jack she's a witch. At first thinking she's simply an amateur magician, Jack finally believes her when she levitates him with her broom. Jack becomes frightened and shoos her away with a stick. Offended and heartbroken, Isabel flies off.

Jack takes this hard, being brought to the studios by the police and becoming disenchanted with the project. Isabel decides to return home, having no further reason to stay. Jack, imagining himself on Late Night with Conan O'Brien, is visited by Uncle Arthur, who convinces Jack not to let Isabel leave, because Jack still loves her, and she won't be able to return for 100 years (which is later proven to be a lie Arthur made up to inspire Jack). Arthur drives him to the studio where he finds Isabel at the set. Jack apologizes to her and tells her he wants to marry her. Six months later, they get married and move into their new neighborhood (which resembles the neighborhood in the series, with the Kravitzes living right across the street).

== Cast ==
- Nicole Kidman as Isabel Bigelow / Samantha Stephens
- Will Ferrell as Jack Wyatt / Darrin Stephens
- Shirley MacLaine as Iris Smythson / Endora
- Michael Caine as Nigel Bigelow
- Jason Schwartzman as Ritchie
- Kristin Chenoweth as Maria Kelly
- Heather Burns as Nina
- Jim Turner as Larry
- Stephen Colbert as Stu Robison
- David Alan Grier as Jim Fields
- Michael Badalucco as Joey Props
- Carole Shelley as Aunt Clara
- Steve Carell as Uncle Arthur
- Katie Finneran as Sheila Wyatt
- Nick Lachey as Cooley
- Kate Walsh as Nadine
- Abbey McBride as Matilda
- Victor Williams as Officer James Bryan
- Roxanne Beckford as Francine Jones
- Amy Sedaris as Gladys Kravitz
- Richard Kind as Abner Kravitz
- Ed McMahon as himself
- Conan O'Brien as himself
- James Lipton as himself

Additionally, Elizabeth Montgomery, Dick York, Agnes Moorehead, and Paul Lynde reprise their roles from the original series in uncredited video cameos.

== Production ==
Bewitched had a complicated development process that took nearly a decade. Rob Morrow and Cynthia Nixon were in talks to star in an adaptation directed by actor Ted Bessell and written by Broadway's Douglas Carter Beane, before Bessell died in 1996. Jim Carrey was in talks to play Darrin. Several writers, including Laurice Elehwany, made changes to the script. Nora Ephron was ultimately hired in 2003. Principal photography took place from the end of 2004 to the beginning of 2005.

== Music ==
The film was composed by George Fenton. The theme song for the Japanese version is "I'll Fall in Love" by Seiko Matsuda.

== Release ==
=== Box office ===
The film was originally planned for release in July 2005 but was later pushed ahead to its eventual release date, June 24, 2005. Budgeted at $85 million, it achieved a worldwide gross of $131.4 million, considered a "box office dud". The total gross for the United States was $63.3 million, with international at $68.1 million. The film was released in the United Kingdom on August 19, 2005, and opened at #2, behind Charlie and the Chocolate Factory.

=== Critical reception ===
On the review aggregator website Rotten Tomatoes, 23% of 185 critics' reviews are positive, with an average rating of 4.6/10. The website's consensus reads: "Bewitched is haunted by scattered laughs and a lack of direction." Metacritic, which uses a weighted average, assigned the film a score of 34 out of 100, based on 39 critics, indicating "generally unfavorable" reviews. Audiences polled by CinemaScore gave the film an average grade of "C+" on an A+ to F scale.

The New York Times called the film "an unmitigated disaster". Australian critics Margaret Pomeranz and David Stratton gave the film three and a half stars out of five stars. Both said that Kidman captured the original character authentically. and Gene Shalit on the Today Show called the film "one of the funniest comedies to come along in years".

=== Awards ===
The film earned Nicole Kidman and Will Ferrell a Golden Raspberry Award for Worst Screen Combo. The film was also nominated for Worst Director, Worst Actor (Will Ferrell), Worst Screenplay, and Worst Remake or Sequel.

Award	Date of ceremony	Category	Recipient(s)	Result	Ref.
First Americans in the Arts	March 25, 2006	Outstanding Supporting Actress Performance in a Film	Kristin Chenoweth	Won	
Razzie Awards	March 4, 2006	Worst Actor	Will Ferrell (also for Kicking & Screaming)	Nominated	
Razzie Awards	March 4, 2006	Worst Screen Couple	Will Ferrell and Nicole Kidman	Won	
Razzie Awards	March 4, 2006	Worst Remake or Sequel	Bewitched	Nominated	
Razzie Awards	March 4, 2006	Worst Director	Nora Ephron	Nominated	
Razzie Awards	March 4, 2006	Worst Screenplay	Nora Ephron & Delia Ephron	Nominated	
Stinkers Bad Movie Awards	March 3, 2006	Worst Picture	Bewitched	Nominated	
Stinkers Bad Movie Awards	March 3, 2006	Worst Sense of Direction (Stop them before they direct again!)	Nora Ephron	Nominated	
Stinkers Bad Movie Awards	March 3, 2006	Worst On-Screen Couple	Will Ferrell and Nicole Kidman	Nominated	
Stinkers Bad Movie Awards	March 3, 2006	Worst Actress	Nicole Kidman	Nominated	
Stinkers Bad Movie Awards	March 3, 2006	Most Annoying Fake Accent: Female	Nicole Kidman	Nominated	
Stinkers Bad Movie Awards	March 3, 2006	Most Intrusive Musical Score	George Fenton	Nominated	
Stinkers Bad Movie Awards	March 3, 2006	Worst Resurrection of a "Classic" TV Series	Bewitched	Nominated	
Teen Choice Awards	August 16, 2005	Choice Summer Movie	Bewitched	Nominated	
Young Artist Awards	March 25, 2006	Best Family Feature Film - Comedy or Musical	Bewitched	Nominated	

== Home media ==
The film was released on VHS and DVD on October 25, 2005, by Sony Pictures Home Entertainment. It included deleted scenes, such as Jack and Isabel's wedding and an extended version of Isabel getting mad, several making-of featurettes, a trivia game, and an audio commentary by the director.

In Australia, a Blu-ray version was released on February 7, 2018.

== New film ==
In 2021, it was announced that Sony Development would produce a new film based on the original television series. Terry Matalas and Travis Fickett would write the script and John Davis and John Fox were set to produce through Davis Entertainment.

== See also ==
- List of films about witchcraft
