= Cartoon Dump =

Comedy podcast

- Genre: Comedy
- Created by: Frank Conniff
- Developed by: Jerry Beck
- Directed by: Scott Ingalls
- Presented by: Erica Doering
- Starring: Frank Conniff; Kathleen Roll
- Voices of: Joel Hodgson/J. Elvis Weinstein as Dumpster Diver Dan
- Theme music composer: Brad Kay; Frank Conniff
- Composer: Brad Kay
- Country of origin: United States
- Original language: English
- No. of seasons: 1
- No. of episodes: 6

Production
- Producers: Jerry Beck; Frank Conniff
- Editor: Kevin O'Regan
- Camera setup: Tomas Arceo; Eric Meacham
- Running time: 7 to 10 minutes

Original release
- Network: Official website; YouTube
- Release: July 11 – October 21, 2007

Cartoon Dump is an online comedy web series/video podcast created by Frank Conniff (formerly of Mystery Science Theater 3000) and animation historian Jerry Beck. A live version was making monthly performances at the Steve Allen Theater in Los Angeles, California, through late 2018 and ran on the first Mondays of each month at QED Astoria in Astoria, New York, starting in January 2008 and continuing through 2018.

== Story and format ==
Set in a garbage dump, the show is a parody of stereotypical children's TV programming. The host of the show, "Compost Brite" (Erica Doering), despite being constantly cheery, obviously has depression as well as anorexia nervosa. Compost Brite starts each episode with the show's theme song, a jolly tune played on a theatre organ (although, Compost Brite is seen playing a guitar). Each episode features slightly different lyrics. After this, Compost Brite usually has a brief satirical discussion with the viewers on topics such as nutrition, dry heaves or how mediocrity pays off in the end. Later, one of Compost Brite's friends, usually "Moodsy the Clinically Depressed Owl" (Conniff) joins in to sing a song or plug some fictional product that is sponsoring the show. This leads into the bulk of each episode, an obscure cartoon from Jerry Beck's archives.

== Episodes ==
As the episodes have no official titles, they are shown here with the titles of their respective cartoons:

1. "Mighty Mister Titan"
2. "The Big World of Little Adam"
3. Bucky and Pepito: "The Vexin' Texan"
4. Captain Fathom: "Rustlers of the Sea Range"
5. "The Adventures of Spunky and Tadpole"
6. "The Adventures of Sir Gee Whiz on the Other Side of the Moon"

== Links ==
- Official website
