= Duck's Breath Mystery Theatre =

American comedy team

- Genre: Sketch comedy
- Date of premiere: 1975
- Location: Iowa, United States

Duck's Breath Mystery Theatre is a comedy team best known for its live performances and radio sketches broadcast on National Public Radio.

The group was formed in 1975 by University of Iowa students Bill Allard, Dan Coffey, Merle Kessler, Leon Martell, and Jim Turner. In 1976, the comedians moved to San Francisco.

In 1980, they released an LP titled Out of Season, and began performing short sketches on NPR's All Things Considered. The sketches became nationally popular, and three of the recurring characters – Dr. Science (Coffey), Ian Shoales (Kessler), and Randee of the Redwoods (Turner) – became better known than the group. Pundit Ian Shoales appeared frequently on ABC's Nightline with Ted Koppel, pioneering the comic genre more recently associated with Jon Stewart and Stephen Colbert. Aging hippie burnout 'Randee' – "with 2 'e's, like the river," was MTV's candidate for president in 1988. A 'Dr. Science' TV show ran on the Fox network for one season in 1987, with the rest of the troupe in the cast.

The Ducks toured throughout the United States during the 1980s, doing live shows at colleges and similar venues, in addition to their radio work. In 1986 they released an LP on Rounder Records titled Born To Be Tiled. In 1989, the group released a feature film, Zadar! Cow From Hell. Unfortunately, the film failed to capture the humor of the group's stage shows and radio sketches, and was not well received by audiences or critics. This disappointment, among other things, led to the group members turning to separate projects after 1990.

Duck's Breath held their first reunion show in San Francisco 2005. They had their last show at the Freight and Salvage in Berkeley on August 29, 2015.
