= Ask Dr. Science =

- Genre: Comedy
- Country of origin: United States
- Language: English
- TV adaptations: Dr. Science
- Starring: Dan Coffey, Merle Kessler
- Produced by: Duck's Breath Mystery Theatre

Ask Dr. Science was a daily humorous radio sketch produced by members of the comedy troupe Duck's Breath Mystery Theatre. It is broadcast on many public radio stations, using a format that mixes elements of a commercial bumper and a public service announcement. A concerned citizen asks a question, which is answered by an expert, "Dr. Science." Not surprisingly, the questions are never answered correctly, and are often little more than a launching point for a non sequitur monologue from Dr. Science. The show's motto is "He knows more than you do." The sketch always concludes with the disclaimer that he is "not a real doctor," although Dr. Science insists he has "a Master's Degree... in science!"

In the segment's earliest days, it was known as Ask Mr. Science; the character's name was changed due to a trademark conflict.

The program features two Duck's Breath members, Dan Coffey as Dr. Science and Merle Kessler as his assistant/announcer Rodney.

The character originated as a quasi-improvised part of the Duck's Breath comedy show. The questions for Dr. Science were solicited from the audience in advance.

== Other media ==
Coffey and Kessler wrote The Official Dr. Science Big Book of Science Simplified! in 1986.

A Dr. Science television series broadcast on Fox in 1987 featured all five members of the Duck's Breath Mystery Theatre joined by Denny Dillon.

Coffey gave the commencement address in character to the 1989 undergraduate and doctoral class at UC Berkley’s department of Molecular Biology.

During the early 2000s, the Warner Bros. website Entertaindom aired a series of CG animated shorts featuring popular clips from the Ask Dr. Science radio broadcasts.
