= Web Weirdos =

- Adventure Time episode
- Episode no.: Season 4 Episode 3
- Directed by: Larry Leichliter (Note: Director); Nate Cash (Note: Creative director); Nick Jennings (Note: Art director)
- Written by: Ako Castuera; Jesse Moynihan
- Story by: Dick Grunert; Patrick McHale; Kent Osborne; Pendleton Ward
- Production code: 1008-081
- Original air date: April 16, 2012
- Running time: 11 minutes

Guest appearances
- Bobcat Goldthwait as Ed; Susie Essman as Barb

Episode chronology
← Previous "Five Short Graybles"	Next → "Dream of Love"
- Adventure Time season 4

"Web Weirdos" is the third episode of the fourth season of the American animated television series Adventure Time. The episode was written and storyboarded by Ako Castuera and Jesse Moynihan, from a story by Patrick McHale, Kent Osborne, and Pendleton Ward. It originally aired on Cartoon Network on April 16, 2012. The episode guest stars both Bobcat Goldthwait and Susie Essman. The series follows the adventures of Finn (voiced by Jeremy Shada), a human boy, and his best friend and adoptive brother Jake (voiced by John DiMaggio), a dog with magical powers to change shape and grow and shrink at will. In this episode, Finn must help a grumpy spider couple, whose names are Barb and Ed, reconcile before he and Jake are eaten.

While storyboarding the episode, Castuera focused her attention on physical comedy. Moynihan, on the other hand, concentrated more on the emotional interactions between the characters, having been inspired by a past experience at couple's therapy. Together with other episodes of Cartoon Network programming, this episode helped make the network the number one television destination for boys aged 2–11, 6–11, and 9–14 on Monday nights. The episode received largely positive reviews from critics, with Oliver Sava of The A.V. Club and Mike Lechevaillier of Slate magazine praising "Web Weirdos" for its themes. On the other hand, Moynihan has expressed some disdain for the episode, reasoning that it did not turn out the way he intended.

== Plot ==
While walking in the woods, Jake begins performing acrobatic moves. Finn attempts to follow, and eventually the two get trapped in a massive spider web. The owners of the web, two large spiders named Ed (voiced by Bobcat Goldthwait) and Barb (voiced by Susie Essman) return, bickering amongst themselves. The argument turns towards Barb's difficulty spinning webs, and she runs away. While Ed wraps Jake in a cocoon, Finn tries to offer relationship advice to Ed; Finn tells the spider to get a gift for his wife, and Ed runs off into the woods to find something.

With the spiders distracted, Finn and Jake try to escape from the web, but to no avail. Ed later returns with a flaming sword, which he presents to Barb. However, she gets angry, arguing that he picked the gift because he liked it, not because she would like it. Angered, Ed cuts the web, releasing Finn and Jake; he claims that Barb is dependent on him for food, as she cannot spin her own webs due to some unknown dysfunction. Barb attacks Ed, noting that she will have to eat him instead. Finn tries to help, but is pinned to a wall by Barb, who suddenly begins to moan as if in pain. Just then, an enormous egg sack emerges from her epigyne. The sack bursts, giving birth to thousands of tiny spiders, who proceed to bury Finn and Jake.

== Production ==
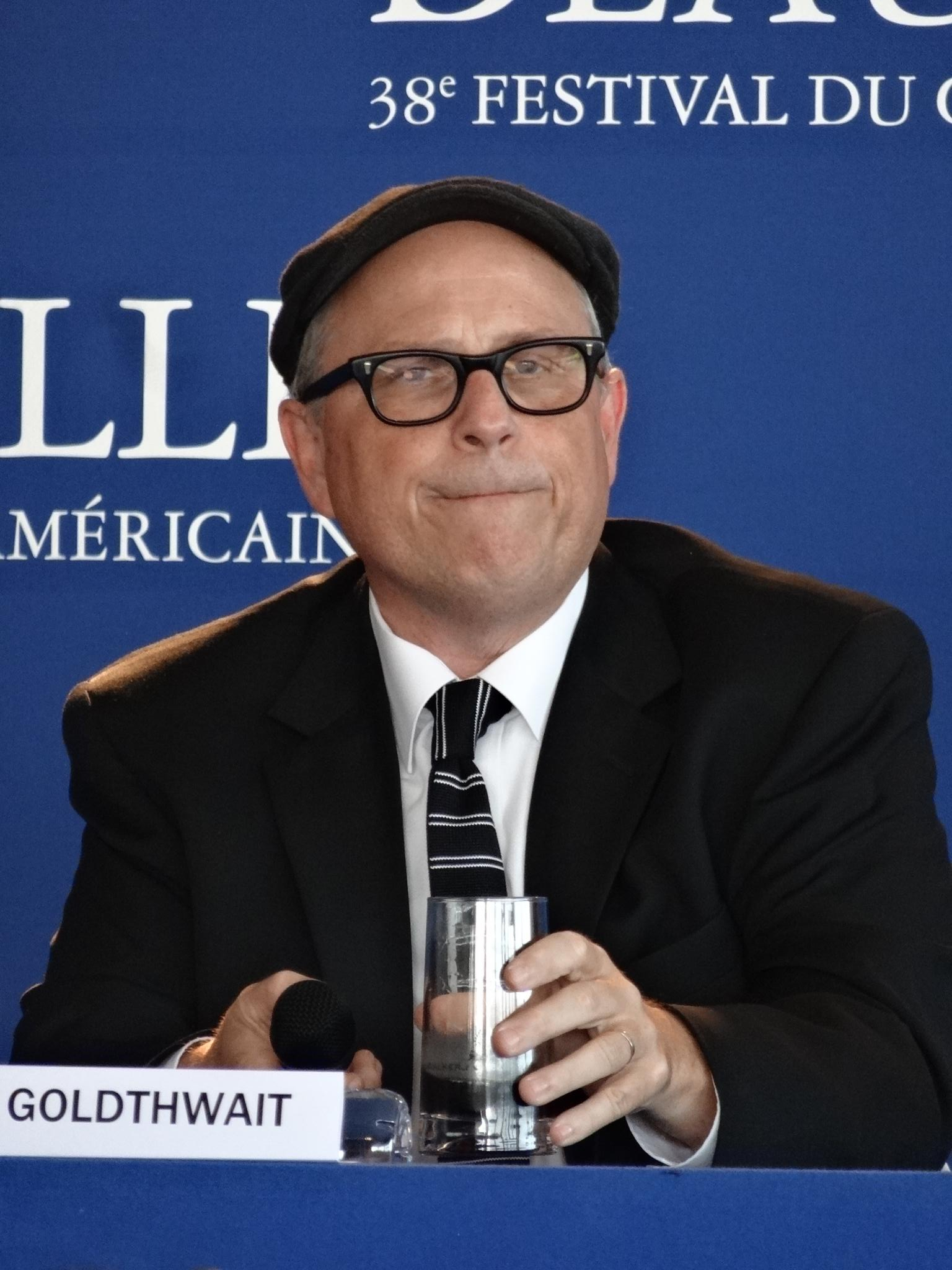
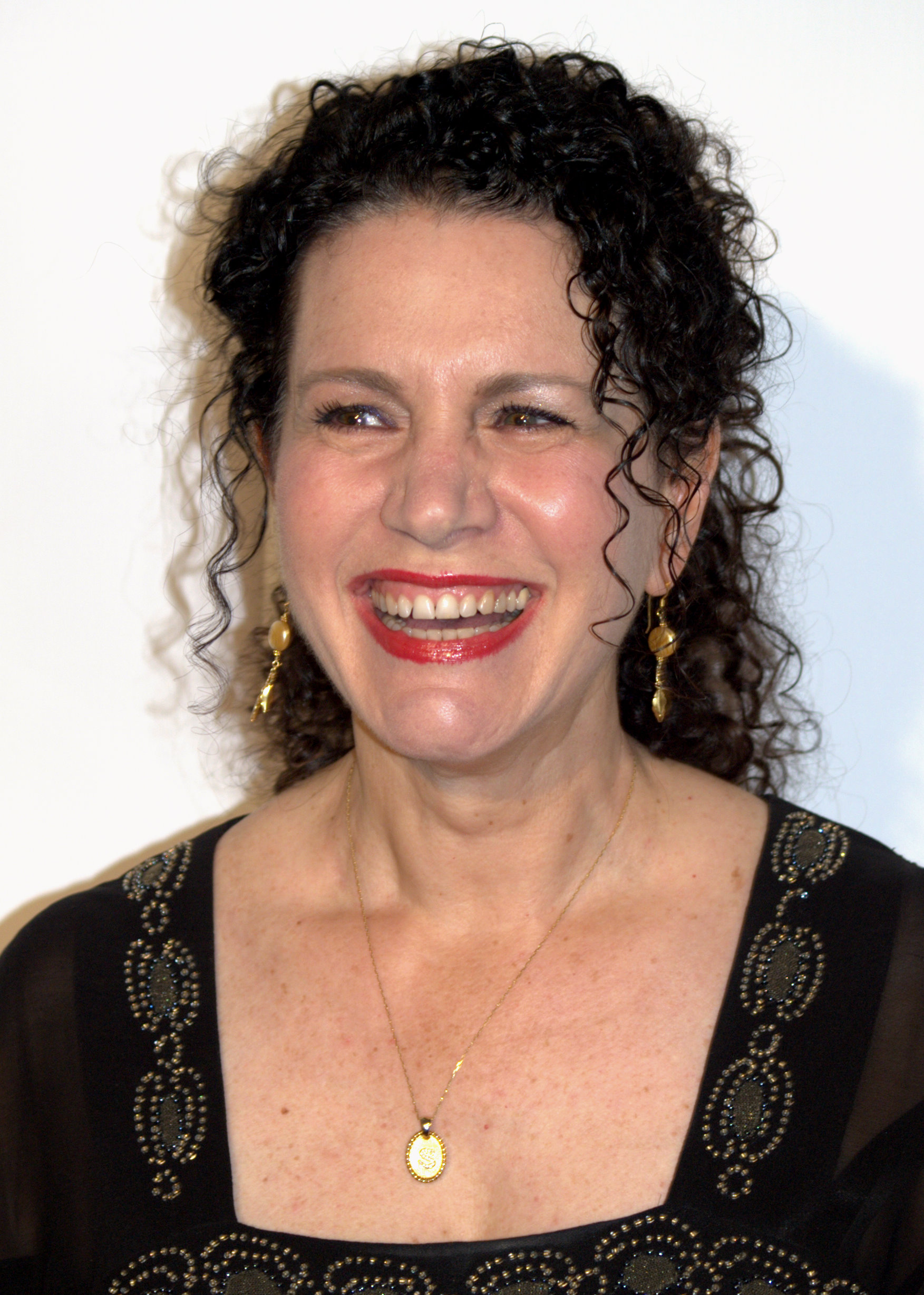
The episode guest stars Bobcat Goldthwait (left) and Susie Essman (right) as Ed and Barb.

"Web Weirdos" was written and storyboarded by Ako Castuera and Jesse Moynihan, from a story developed by series creator Pendleton Ward, Patrick McHale, Kent Osborne, and Dick Grunert. According to Ward, the original outline for the episode was "super-sitcomy" and "standard", but when Castuera and Moynihan began working on it, they took the story in a different direction. In the DVD commentary for the episode, Castuera argued that this episode is epitomic of their differing storyboarding sensibilities, as her scenes focus mostly on physical comedy, whereas Moynihan's focus on emotion. For instance, the first half of the episode (storyboarded by Castuera) opens with Finn and Jake parkouring off of boulders and rubble, whereas the second part of the episode (storyboarded by Moynihan) focuses almost entirely on Barb and Ed's complicated relationship. According to Moynihan, much of his storyboard material was inspired by experiences he had had at couples therapy with a former girlfriend. He noted that for him, the episode was based on the idea that you have to have empathy for your partner.

The episode guest stars Bobcat Goldthwait and Susie Essman as Ed and Barb, respectively. The designs for the spiders are idiosyncratic, as they were purposely crafted by Castuera and Moynihan to differ from other types of cartoon spiders. Castuera later said that their designs reminded her of "stuff I find at thrift stores". Before the episode aired, Cartoon Network's standard and practices department took issue with the sound that plays when Ed secretes silk. Originally, the sound effect was "gooier [and] fartier", but this was later cut and replaced with a more tame sound effect. Two of the bugs that are trapped on the spider web with Finn and Jake are voiced by series storyboard artist Cole Sanchez and voice actor Tom Kenny.

== Reception ==
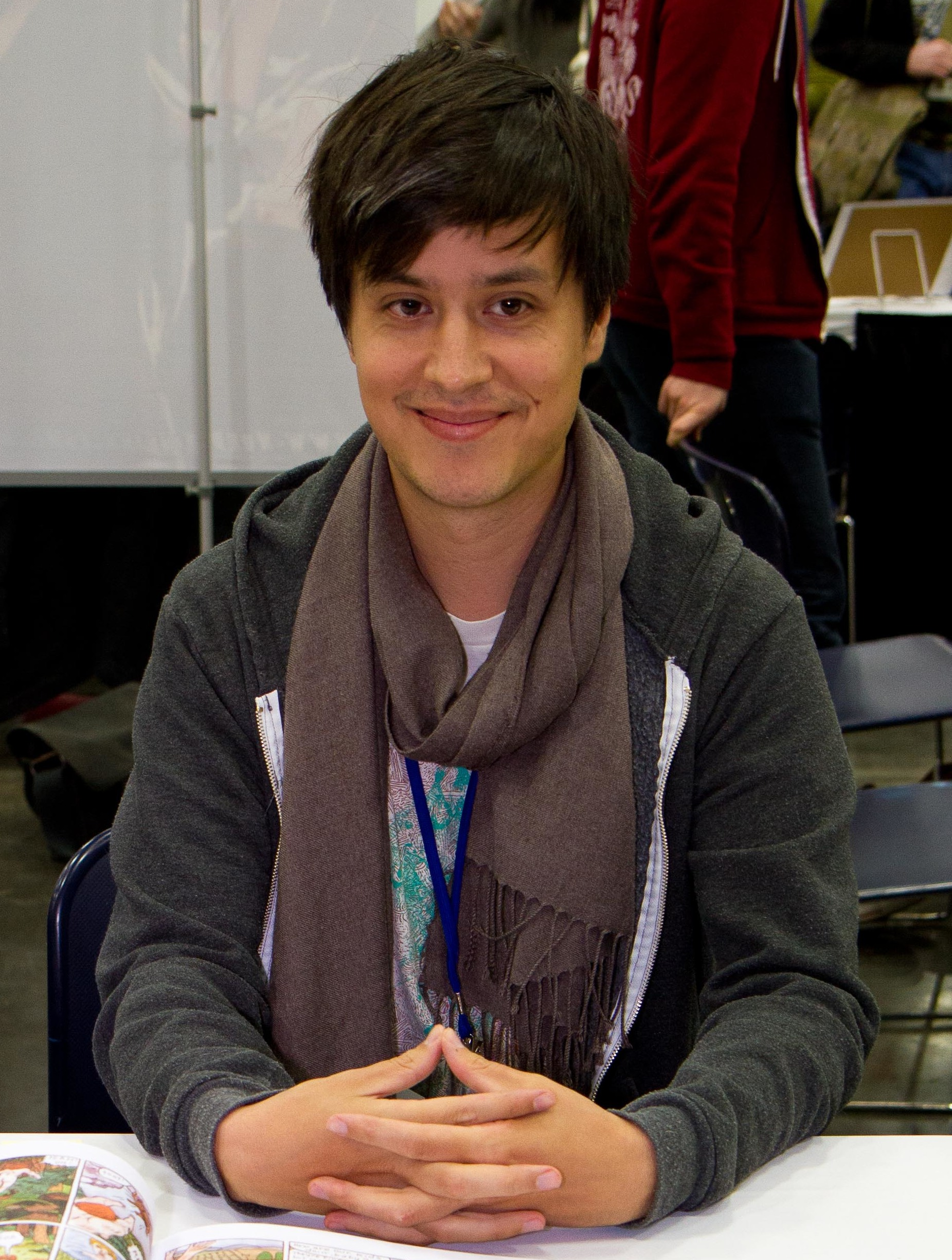
Jesse Moynihan, the co-storyboarder of this episode, was unsatisfied with his work on this episode.

"Web Weirdos" first aired on Cartoon Network on April 16, 2012. Together with other episodes of Cartoon Network programming, this episode helped make the network the number one television destination for boys aged 2–11, 6–11, and 9–14 on Monday nights, according to Nielsen ratings. The episode first saw physical release as part of the complete fourth season DVD in October 2014.

Oliver Sava of The A.V. Club awarded the episode an "A−", arguing that the importance of communication in a relationship is paramount, and an extremely important lesson for the young children who watch Adventure Time to learn. He thus complimented "Web Weirdos" for exploring this topic through the idiosyncratic tale of two married but ultimately unhappy spiders, calling this decision one of "the reason[s] why Adventure Time has such crossover appeal". Sava also complimented the performances of both Essman and Goldthwait, noting that the two "make a great pair, capturing the stakes of the couple’s fight without sacrificing the comedy of the situation."

Mike Lechevaillier of Slate magazine, in a review of the fourth season, argued that the episode—along with many other fourth season episodes that focus on love and infatuation— "present[s] determinedly adult interrelations through the eyes of the inexperienced Finn". In particular, he noted that "Web Weirdos" revolves around complicated themes like the nature of failing relationships and unexpected pregnancy. Ultimately, Lechevaillier compared and contrasted the episode with the following episode "Dream of Love", noting that both deal with relationships in different ways, "yet do so with such originality, humbleness, and poise that any viewer, from age six to 60, can find something to identify with."

Moynihan later expressed dissatisfaction with the resulting episode; he felt that, while he took creative risks with the episode, his efforts fell flat. In an online interview, he explained, "I think Ako's parts are funny, but everything I wrote in the episode played out in a way that I didn't expect. It's the one episode I've worked on that I really feel didn't do anything I intended."
