= Mark Fite =

American actor and comedian

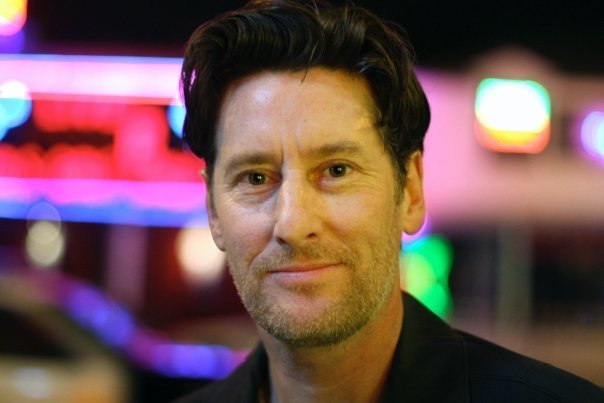
- Fite in 2012
- Born: Mark Elliott Fite; Illinois, U.S.
- Occupations: Actor, comedian

Mark Elliott Fite is an American actor and comedian.

== Career ==
Fite is a founding member of the comedy group 2 Headed Dog with comedians Jim Turner, Dave Allen, and Craig Anton. He is known for creating roles and performing in comedy shows including The Tony Martini Variety Hour, Bob's Office Party, The Rudy Casoni Show, Girly Magazine Party, Clowntown City Limits, and Wife Swappers. Fite has worked with several theatre companies in Los Angeles, including The Actors' Gang, Theater of NOTE, and Padua Hills Playwrights' Festival where he worked with writers Murray Mednick, Leon Martell, Marlane Meyer, and John Steppling.

Fite has performed at multiple comedy venues and festivals around the country, as well as appearing at local L.A. favorites, Lucha VaVoom and Brookledge Follies.

In the 1990s, Fite had a prominent role as "Mark the Trasher" on the MTV game show Trashed, on which he destroyed the prized possessions of unlucky contestants. He has since appeared in television shows including SpongeBob SquarePants, Infinity Train, Agents of S.H.I.E.L.D., Scandal, Criminal Minds, Clash-A-Rama!, Parenthood, Grey's Anatomy, Rules of Engagement, The Naked Trucker and T-Bones Show, Friends, Seinfeld, and NewsRadio. Fite's varied film credits include Fight Club, Independence Day, Godzilla, Off the Lip, Elephant Sighs, The Adventures of Pinocchio, and in the short film for Dior (L.A.dy Dior) with Academy Award Winner Marion Cotillard, directed by John Cameron Mitchell.

In 2009, Fite performed in the comedy Matthew Modine Saves the Alpacas alongside Matthew Modine and French Stewart at the Geffen Playhouse in Los Angeles.

In 2016, Fite performed on stage with the Los Angeles Philharmonic at Walt Disney Concert Hall in La Mer, part of the L.A. Phil Symphonies For Youth Program.

== Filmography ==
=== Film ===
Year	Title	Role	Notes
1988	Tapeheads	Violin player	Uncredited
1996	The Cable Guy	Medieval Times Knight	Uncredited
1996	Independence Day	Pilot	
1996	Alien Beach Party Massacre	Jeff	
1996	364 Girls a Year	Lance	
1997	Courting Courtney	Gus	
1998	Stuart Bliss	Reverend Walmsley	
1998	Godzilla	Radio Operator	
1999	Dill Scallion	Security Guard	
1999	Fight Club	Man #2 at Auto Shop	
2000	Left-Overs	Zack	
2002	Hip! Edgy! Quirky!	Barry	
2004	Off the Lip	Lenser	
2005	Happy Endings	Tess's Drunk Husband	
2007	Shiloh Falls	Confederate	
2012	Elephant Sighs	Nick	
2012	Janeane from Des Moines	Janeane's Brother	
2015	The SpongeBob Movie: Sponge Out of Water	Customer #2	Voice
2015	The Lost One	Jerry Walsh	
2020	Hollywood Fringe	Dinner Partier Mike	
2020	Mank	James Wilson	
2020	Embattled	David Adelsberg	

=== Television ===
Year	Title	Role	Notes
1995	Seinfeld	Jack	Episode: "The Kiss Hello"
1995	Living Single	The Photographer	Episode: "Another Saturday Night"
1995	The Drew Carey Show	Customer	Episode: "Lewis' Sister"
1995	The TV Wheel	Various roles	Television film
1996	Malcolm & Eddie	Paramedic Jim	Episode: "Dead Guy"
1996	Sabrina the Teenage Witch	Cicero	Episode: "Geek Like Me"
1996	Mr. Show with Bob and David: Fantastic Newness	Various characters	Television film
1996, 1997	NewsRadio	Waiter / Counterman	2 episodes
1997	The Naked Truth	The Repairman	Episode: "A Year in the Life"
1997	Men Behaving Badly	Wayne	Episode: "The Party Favor"
1998	Alright Already	Tom	Episode: "Again with the Hockey Player: Part 1"
1998	The Army Show	Guy in bar	Episode: "The Visitor"
1999	Friends	The Salesman	Episode: "The One with the Cop"
2000	Tenacious D	Jesus Ranch Cult Member	Episode: "Road Gig"
2002	Friday Night Videos	Two Headed Dog	Episode #2.9
2002	The Andy Dick Show	Various roles	Episode: "My Dad Was an 80's Popstar"
2004	Back When We Were Grownups	Jeep	Television film
2005	Cheap Seats	Jeff Harbaugh	Episode: "1980 MLB All-Star Game"
2005–2007	Ned's Declassified School Survival Guide	Benedict Arnold / Emotion	3 episodes
2005–2013	SpongeBob SquarePants	Various roles	24 episodes
2006	Close to Home	Fred Cooper	Episode: "The Shot"
2007	The Naked Trucker and T-Bones Show	Speedboat Glen	Episode: "Demo Tape"
2007	Rules of Engagement	Guest	Episode: "Engagement Party"
2008	Faux Baby	Frank	Episode: "Super Dad"
2011	Grey's Anatomy	Jared Cassidy	Episode: "Start Me Up"
2013	Rizzoli & Isles	Blake Smith	Episode: "Cold as Ice"
2014	Parenthood	Healer #1	Episode: "A Potpourri of Freaks"
2014–2015	International Ghost Investigators	Supervisor	5 episodes
2015	Mike & Molly	Waiter	Episode: "Near Death Do Us Part"
2017	Criminal Minds	Regina's Dad	Episode: "Profiling 202"
2017	Scandal	Congressman Adam Kelly	Episode: "Pressing the Flesh"
2017, 2018	Mighty Magiswords	Various roles	2 episodes
2018	Agents of S.H.I.E.L.D.	Getty	Episode: "Principia"
2018–2019	Clash-A-Rama!	Various voices	7 episodes
2019	NCIS	Walter Miller	Episode: "Silent Service"
2019	Infinity Train	Andy Olsen / Harry	2 episodes
2021	Mom	Wendell	2 episodes
2021	Bob Hearts Abishola	Waiter	Episode: "Old Strokey"
