= Steve Higgins =

American actor, writer (b. 1963)

- Born: August 13, 1963 (age 63); Des Moines, Iowa, U.S.
- Notable work: Saturday Night Live; Late Night with Jimmy Fallon; The Tonight Show Starring Jimmy Fallon; The Higgins Boys and Gruber
- Spouse: Ellen Niedert Higgins (m. 1990)
- Children: 4, including John Higgins
- Relatives: David Anthony Higgins (brother); Alan J. Higgins (brother); Abby Elliott (niece); Bridey Elliott (niece); Chris Elliott (brother-in-law)

Comedy career
- Years active: 1988–present
- Medium: Stand-up, television, film
- Genres: Sketch comedy, observational comedy, political satire, social satire

Steve Earl Higgins (born August 13, 1963) is an American writer, producer, announcer, actor, and comedian. He has served as the announcer and sidekick of The Tonight Show Starring Jimmy Fallon since 2014, and as a writer and producer of Saturday Night Live since 1995. Prior to The Tonight Show, he was the announcer for Late Night with Jimmy Fallon from 2009 to 2014. Early in his career, he was part of the sketch comedy trio The Higgins Boys and Gruber, who had their own eponymous sketch series on Comedy Central from 1989 to 1991.

== Early life ==
Higgins was born on August 13, 1963, in Des Moines, Iowa, to Marian (née Coppola) and Harold Higgins, who managed the custodial operations for the West Des Moines Community School District. He was one of five children, including his brothers David and Alan. Higgins formed the comedy troupe "Don't Quit Your Day Job," with brothers David and Alan and friend Dave "Gruber" Allen. They performed at notable places in Iowa including the Hotel Kirkwood, Corky's, and the Spaghetti Works.

== Career ==
Don't Quit Your Day Job eventually moved to California, where they started performing in Los Angeles and soon got their big break on the Comedy Central sketch comedy series The Higgins Boys and Gruber. Following a very lean year after their third year performing, the group was suddenly relegated to selling donated "merch" at yard sales in the Mississippi backwoods. These forays into sales usually netted the group lunch money or at least Vienna sausage money.

In 1989, Higgins performed at The Vic Theatre in Chicago for HBO's One Night Stand television series, along with his brother Dave, and Gruber. Alongside Nick Bakay, Higgins performed in 1993 at the Girly Magazine Party show at Theatre/Theater in Hollywood, Los Angeles. They played "a sleazoid male chauvinist comedy duo who exchange off-color ethnic jokes and prance around in suits and ties like Steve Martin on PCP." His brother, Dave, performed in the show and in a separate act. Higgins was praised for his ability to know "when to go over the top and when to rein it in" and how he was able to be "acutely tuned in to the comings and goings around them and know how to play off each other." Soon after, Higgins went on to become a writer for the short-lived MTV programs Trashed and The Jon Stewart Show.

From 1995 to 1997, Higgins was the co-head writer of Saturday Night Live. Since 1997, he has served on the writing staff of the show, and since 1996, he has served as a producer of the show. In 2000, he played the inspirational AV teacher in the last episode of Freaks and Geeks. He has been nominated for several Emmy Awards, including Outstanding Variety, Music or Comedy Series and Outstanding Writing for a Variety, Music or Comedy Program in 2008, for his work on Saturday Night Live and as a writer. In a 2012 interview with The A.V. Club, former Saturday Night Live writer Michael Schur revealed that Higgins was the inspiration for the Parks and Recreation character Andy Dwyer after Higgins would playfully fight with him when they worked together at SNL.

From 2009 to 2014, Higgins served as announcer on Late Night with Jimmy Fallon. When Jimmy Fallon was selected by NBC to succeed Jay Leno, Higgins was brought on as announcer for The Tonight Show Starring Jimmy Fallon. From 2013 to 2015, Higgins voiced Mr. Awesome in the Hulu original series The Awesomes. He voiced the character "Chadwick the Edible Blargmonger" in the 2014 animated special Elf: Buddy's Musical Christmas. In 2017, he won an Emmy for his work on SNL.

In July 2015, while Jimmy Fallon was recovering from surgery after suffering a serious injury to his finger, Higgins was hospitalized for Lyme disease. He returned to The Tonight Show after recovering, on the same night that Fallon also returned to the program.

== Personal life ==
Higgins married Ellen Niedert Higgins in 1990, and they have four children together. Their son John Higgins (a part of the Please Don't Destroy group) was hired to write on SNL in 2021.

Media offices
Preceded by Joel Godard	Late Night announcer March 2, 2009 – February 7, 2014	Succeeded by Ron McClary
Preceded by Wally Wingert	The Tonight Show announcer February 17, 2014 – present	Succeeded by Incumbent
