= Dave Allen (actor) =

American actor and comedian

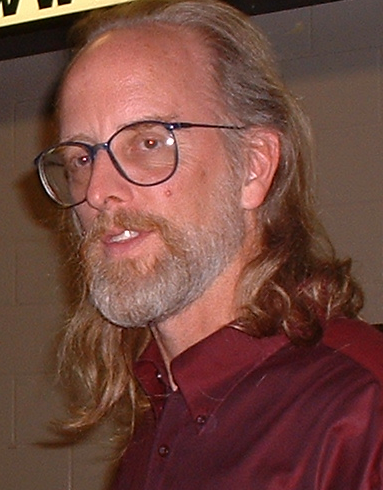
- Allen in November 2008
- Born: Naperville, Illinois, US
- Other names: Gruber, Dave (Gruber) Allen, David Gruber Allen
- Education: Augustana College
- Occupations: Actor, comedian
- Years active: 1980s–present

David Allen, known professionally as Dave (Gruber) Allen is an American television and film actor and comedian, best known for his work on the 1990 TV series The Higgins Boys and Gruber (with Steve Higgins and David Anthony Higgins, with whom he had formed the comedy troup Don't Quit Your Day Job in the '80s). and playing guidance counselor Jeff Rosso on the Judd Apatow-produced comedy-drama Freaks and Geeks. He played Mr. Kwest on Ned's Declassified School Survival Guide and a town troubadour on Gilmore Girls. Allen had a minor role as an "Electrocuted Ghost" known as "Sparky" in the 2016 film Ghostbusters.

== Early and personal life ==
Allen was born and raised to a Lutheran family in Naperville, Illinois. He graduated from Naperville Central High School, where a classmate gave him the nickname "Groover" which over time changed to "Gruber" and inspired his professional name. Allen discovered his love for music as a child attending church. His preferred way to be identified professionally is "Dave (Gruber) Allen", with "Gruber" in parentheses.

As of 2013, he lives in Salt Lake City.

== Career ==
Allen started doing stand up comedy in Des Moines, Iowa as part of the comedy troupe “Don’t Quit Your Day Job”.He plays the "Naked Trucker," a character that first appeared as part of a sketch comedy show 2 Headed Dog. In 1990, he starred in "The Higgins Boys and Gruber" with Steve Higgins and David Anthony Higgins. In 1998, at the invitation of Largo owner Mark Flannigan, Allen began to appear as the Naked Trucker as a solo act, opening at Largo in L.A. for Tenacious D, Jon Brion, and others. The act was an instant success and soon expanded to include David Koechner, who plays "T-Bones." Koechner and Allen starred in The Naked Trucker and T-Bones Show on Comedy Central, which was picked up for eight episodes.

Allen is a member of comedy group 2 Headed Dog with comedians Jim Turner, Mark Fite, and Craig Anton. He also made an appearance as a minor character, Mr. Woodward, one of Reese's teachers on the television show Malcolm in the Middle. Allen frequently plays the character "Todd Carlin", a fictional hippie relative of George Carlin. Allen has guest starred on Gilmore Girls, where he played a town troubadour, organic farmer, and a de facto minister officiating a wedding. He has been credited in many movies and television roles as Dave (Gruber) Allen and David Gruber Allen.

Allen has provided multiple voice performances, such as on animated series King of the Hill episodes "Unfortunate Son", "Phish and Wildlife", "Raise the Steaks", and "Bill's House". Allen has also provided his voice in Random! Cartoons clips. Later on, Allen also played several different characters in NBC's Newsradio, and appeared as night school teacher "Randy", teaching basic auto repair and maintenance in the episode "Motor Skills" of the eighth season of the sitcom Frasier. He has appeared as a hippie on Mr. Show with Bob and David and a protester on Arrested Development. In 2006, Allen appeared in the Stan and Lois sketch on Norm Macdonald's comedy album Ridiculous (released by Comedy Central Records).

In November 2008, Allen appeared as "Todd"—and was credited as "Todd Carlin"—in the Cinematic Titanic episode "Santa Claus Conquers the Martians" during the pre-movie sequence, introducing the movie to the crew. Additionally, Allen has been touring periodically at live shows with Cinematic Titanic, performing his stand-up routine. In 2010, Allen was featured as a sci-fi author in season two of Party Down and made a cameo in the film The Mother of Invention as Dr. Henry Miller. In 2011, Allen had a small role in the movie Bad Teacher. In 2012, Allen played the salesman of a futuristic elder care center in "Life Begins at Rewirement," an episode of the ITVS/PBS sci-fi series Futurestates. He also appeared in a recurring role on the CBS series Mike & Molly.

Allen also provided the voice of Frostferatu, among several other characters, in Cartoon Network's Mighty Magiswords episodes "Share and Share Dislike", "Hideous Hound", "Transylbabies", "Collection Infection", and "King of Zombeez", created by MooBeard the Cow Pirate creator, Kyle A. Carrozza. In 2017, Allen appeared as the recurring character Dave the Taxidermist in NBC's Trial & Error.

== Filmography ==
=== Film ===
Year	Title	Role	Notes
1989	Narco Dollar	Mortera's Men	
1991	Fist of Glory	High Roller	
1997	Life Sold Separately	Roger	
1999	Dill Scallion	Slim	
2002	Crossroads	Bar Patron	
2004	Off the Lip	Pupule	
2004	Anchorman: The Legend of Ron Burgundy	Fondue Restaurant Patron	
2004	Wake Up, Ron Burgundy: The Lost Movie	Skeevy Guy	
2006	Unaccompanied Minors	Gas Station Attendant	
2006	Smiley Face	Hippie #1	
2008	Largo	Todd Carlin	
2009	The Mother of Invention	Dr. Henry Miller	
2010	Drones	Cooperman	
2011	Bad Teacher	Sandy Pinkus	
2014	Veronica Mars	60-Year-Old Rocker	
2014	Sex Tape	Mailman	
2016	Ghostbusters	Electrocuted Ghost	
2018	Boy Band	Davy	
2025	The Big Whoop	Gustav	

=== Television ===
Year	Title	Role	Notes
1989–1990	"The Higgins Boys and Gruber"	Fictionalized self	Also writer
1995	The Drew Carey Show	Lawyer	Episode: "Drew Meets Lawyers"
1995	The TV Wheel	Various	Television film; uncredited
1995–1996	Get Serious: Seven Deadly Sins	Himself	6 episodes
1996	Mr. Show with Bob and David	Hippie	Episode: "The Biggest Failure in Broadway History"
1996	Sabrina the Teenage Witch	Pizza Manager	Episode: "A Girl and Her Cat"
1997, 1999	NewsRadio	Eric Stark / Lackey	2 episodes
1998	Working	Poet	Episode: "Home-O-Apathy"
1998	3rd Rock from the Sun	Arthur	Episode: "Indecent Dick"
1999	Chill	Naked Trucker	Television film
1999–2000	Freaks and Geeks	Jeff Rosso	11 episodes
2000	Spin City	Crackpot	Episode: "Blind Faith"
2000	Tenacious D	Jesus Ranch Cult Member	Episode: "Road Gig"
2001	Frasier	Randy	Episode: "Motor Skills"
2001	Malcolm in the Middle	Mr. Woodward	Episode: "Tutoring Reese"
2001	Dead Last	Big Tiny	Episode: "Laughlin It Up"
2001–2006	Gilmore Girls	The 2nd Troubadour / The Minister	4 episodes
2002	Late Friday	Two Headed Dog	Episode #2.9
2002	Late Night with Conan O'Brien	The Naked Trucker	Episode #10.13
2002–2007	King of the Hill	Appleseed / Jesse	4 episodes
2003	Comedy Central Laughs for Life Telethon 2003	The Naked Trucker	Television special
2004	I'm with Her	Horse Wrangler	Episode: "Party of Two"
2004	Arrested Development	Activist	Episode: "Whistler's Mother"
2004	Cheap Seats	Guy LeFleur	Episode: "Superdogs! Superjocks"
2004	Grounded for Life	Therapist	Episode: "Psycho Therapy"
2004	Complete Savages	Wendell	Episode: "Carnival Knowledge"
2005	Yes, Dear	Insurance Agent	Episode: "Broken by the Mold"
2005–2007	Ned's Declassified School Survival Guide	Mr. Kwest / Abraham Lincoln	10 episodes
2006, 2009	SpongeBob SquarePants	Boys Who Cry Member / The Guy on the Penny	2 episodes
2006	Lucky Louie	Professor Bill	Episode: "Get Out"
2006	Jimmy Kimmel Live!	The Naked Trucker	Episode #4.382
2007	The Naked Trucker and T-Bones Show	The Naked Trucker	8 episodes
2008	Random! Cartoons	Dark Blade of Fire	Episode: "MooBeard the Cow Pirate"
2009, 2010	True Jackson, VP	Mitchell	2 episodes
2010	United States of Tara	Schreiber	Episode: "The Truth Hurts"
2010	Party Down	AF Gordon Theodore	Episode: "Joel Munt's Big Deal Party"
2010	Warren the Ape	Liquor Store Cashier	Episode: "Gay Ape"
2010	Scooby-Doo! Mystery Incorporated	Rick Yantz / Announcer / Hospital PA	Episode: "When the Cicada Calls"
2012	Big Time Rush	Therapist	Episode: "Big Time Move"
2012	Hot in Cleveland	David Gates	Episode: "I'm with the Band"
2012	Bob's Burgers	Bill	Episode: "Food Truckin'"
2012	FutureStates	Sales Associate	Episode: "Life Begins at Rewirement"
2012	NTSF:SD:SUV::	Crowley Morehouse	Episode: "Comic-Con-Flict"
2012	Ben and Kate	Scott	Episode: "Guitar Face"
2012, 2013	Mike & Molly	Tom	2 episodes
2013	The Middle	Professor Morson	Episode: "The Jump"
2013	Axe Cop	Voice	2 episodes
2014	Parenthood	Guru	Episode: "A Potpourri of Freaks"
2015	W/ Bob & David	Extra Beatle Fan	Episode #1.2
2015	Granite Flats	Dinsmore	Episode: "Our Rendezvous Is Fitly Appointed"
2016	Tween Fest	Twonkmaster Chris	4 episodes
2016–2018	Love	Allan	8 episodes
2016–2019	Star vs. the Forces of Evil	Additional Voices / Sir Crandle / Mr. Candle	4 episodes
2017	Trial & Error	Dave the Taxidermist	6 episodes
2017–2018	Mighty Magiswords	Frostferatu / Tooth Fairy / Cold Foot	4 episodes
2018	Preacher	Swami	Episode: "Sonsabitches"
2018	Rob Riggle's Ski Master Academy	Gil	8 episodes
2018	It's a Beach Thing	The Prophet	Episode: "Pilot"
