= Dill Scallion =

1999 film by Jordan Brady

- Directed by: Jordan Brady
- Written by: Jordan Brady
- Produced by: Joe Blake; Kimberly Jacobs; Jennifer Amerine
- Starring: Billy Burke; Lauren Graham
- Cinematography: Jonathan Brown
- Edited by: Sam Citron
- Music by: Sheryl Crow
- Production companies: Brady Oil Entertainment; Conspiracy Entertainment; Pedestrian Films
- Distributed by: The Asylum
- Release date: March 11, 1999
- Running time: 91 minutes
- Country: United States
- Language: English
- Budget: $500,000

Dill Scallion is a 1999 American mockumentary film that follows the rise and fall of a country-western singer, Dill Scallion. It was written and directed by Jordan Brady. It is known for its eclectic cast including Lauren Graham, Kathy Griffin, David Koechner, Henry Winkler, Dave "Gruber" Allen, Wayne Federman, Jason Priestley, Robert Wagner, Dana Gould, Peter Berg, Michael Rodgers, Rachel Grate, and Spencer Garrett, as well as cameos from country western singers LeAnn Rimes, Travis Tritt, and Willie Nelson. Michael Rodgers and Sheryl Crow wrote most of the music for the film.

The film was released in 1999 only on VHS. A collectors edition DVD was released in 2000.

== Plot ==
Dill Scallion, a school bus driver residing in a small Texan community, unexpectedly catapults into stardom within the country and western music scene. His sudden rise follows the success of his song, "I Discovered Love at a Relative Gathering," which becomes a chart-topper. Dill gains immense fame for his distinct dance routines, which are notably unconventional due to a serious foot injury. To maintain his signature dance moves, Dill continually re-injures his foot, allowing him to keep performing.

== Cast ==
- Billy Burke as Dill Scallion
- Lauren Graham as Kristie Sue
- Kathy Griffin as Tina
- David Koechner as Bubba Pearl
- Henry Winkler as Larry Steinberg
- Dave "Gruber" Allen as "Slim"
- Wayne Federman as "Doc"
- Jason Priestley as Joe "Jo-Jo" Hicks
- Robert Wagner as Mr. Llama
- Dana Gould as Ernie, The Emcee
- Peter Berg as Nate Clumson
- Chris Spencer as "Vibe" Host
- Michael Hitchcock as Rusty Bob
