= Jim Turner (comedian) =

American actor and comedian

- Born: October 28, 1952 (age 73); Colorado Springs, Colorado, U.S.
- Occupations: Actor, comedian
- Spouse: Lynn Freer (m. 1992)
- Children: 1

Jim Turner (born October 28, 1952) is an American actor and stand-up comedian. He is best known as Randee of the Redwoods on MTV and for his supporting roles as Kirby Carlisle in Arli$$ (1996–2002) and as Larry in Bewitched (2005).

== Life and career ==
Turner was born in Colorado Springs, Colorado. His father, George Turner, was in the Air Force and moved his family around often during Jim's youth to several locations, including Quebec, Arizona, and Iowa. Turner studied at the University of Iowa where he and fellow students founded the comedy troupe Duck's Breath Mystery Theatre.

From 1987 to 1990, Turner performed on MTV and Ha! as Randee of the Redwoods, a character he adapted from his days with Duck's Breath. As part of a marketing stunt, Randee became the dark horse candidate for president.

Turner married Lynn Freer in 1992 and they have a son.

He co-starred for seven seasons in HBO's comedy series Arliss as Kirby Carlisle, an ex-football-star-turned-agent and an old buddy of sports agent Arliss Michaels (Robert Wuhl).

Turner has appeared multiple times as a guest on The George Lucas Talk Show, most notably with fellow cast members Robert Wuhl and Michael Boatman during the May the AR Be LI$$ You Arli$$ marathon fundraiser, as well as with Robert Wuhl on The George Lucas Holiday Special.

Turner is a founding member of the Los Angeles-based comedy group 2 Headed Dog with comedians Mark Fite, Dave (Gruber) Allen, and Craig Anton.

== Film and television credits ==
- Porklips Now (1980)
- Kid Colter (1984)
- St. Elmo's Fire (1985)
- The Lost Boys (1987)
- Programmed to Kill (1987)
- Destroyer (1988)
- Batman (1989)
- My Samurai (1992)
- 12:01 (1993)
- Shelf Life (1993)
- Rugrats (1993)
- The Ref (1994)
- Coldblooded (1995)
- If Not for You (1995)
- 364 Girls a Year (1996)
- The Pompatus of Love (1996)
- Joe's Apartment (1996)
- Arli$$ (1996–2002)
- Kicking & Screaming (2005)
- Bewitched (2005)
- Grunt: The Wrestling Movie
- On The Ropes
- Cal (2013)
- Granite Flats
- DLife

== Guest appearances ==
- Dharma & Greg (ABC)
- That 70s Show (Fox)
- Tracey Takes On... (HBO)
- Sliders (Sci-Fi Channel)
- Lost on Earth (USA Network)
- Grace Under Fire (ABC)
- The Larry Sanders Show (HBO)
- Tom (ABC)
- Roseanne (ABC)
- The King of Queens (CBS)
- Yes Dear (CBS)
- Jonas (Disney Channel)
- Boston Legal (ABC)
- The Big Bang Theory (CBS)
- Castle (ABC)
- Grey's Anatomy (ABC)
- Anger Management (FX)
- The George Lucas Talk Show
- Righteous Gemstones (HBO)
