= Jerry Beck =

American animation historian (born 1955)

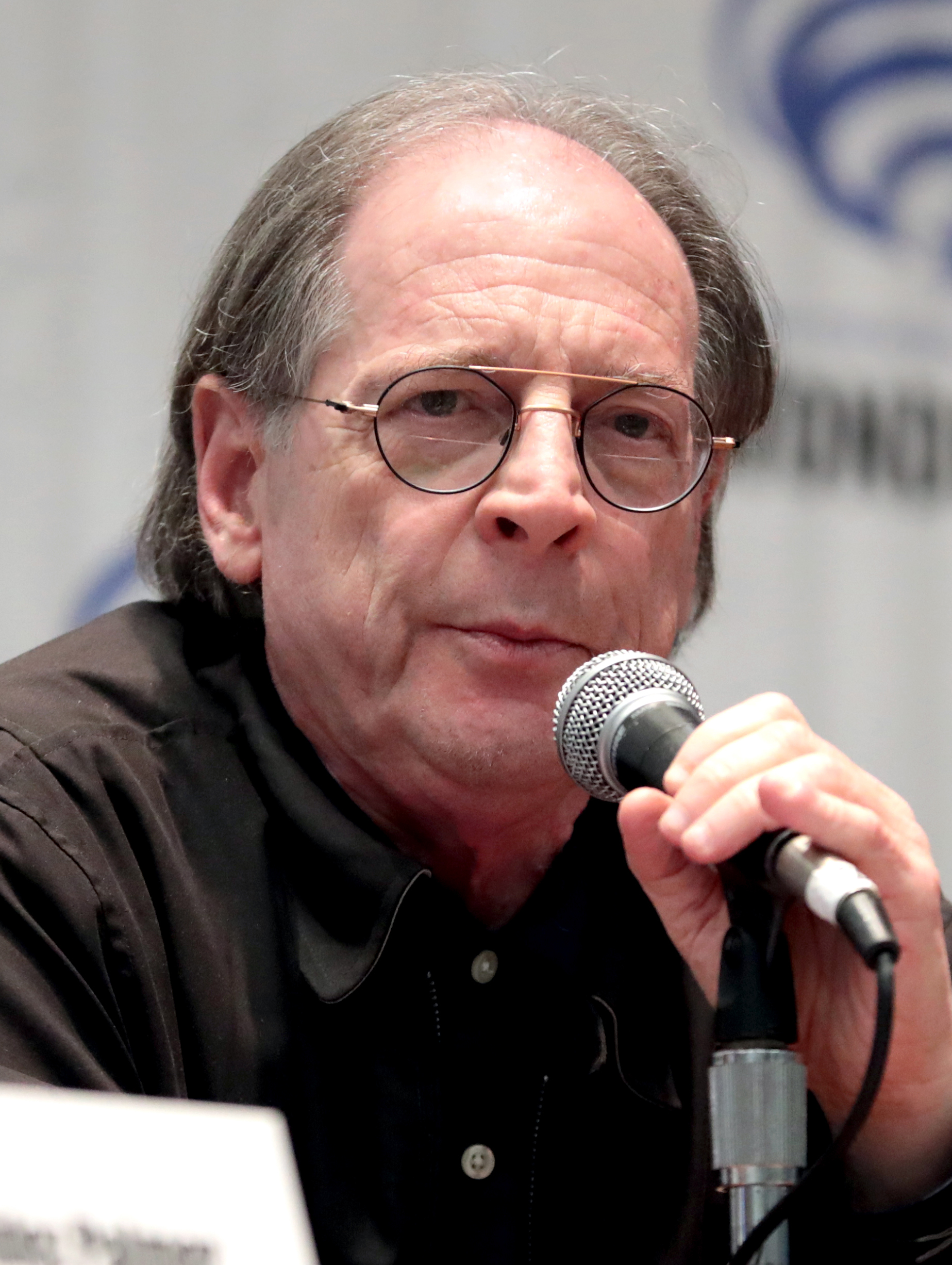
- Beck at the 2023 WonderCon
- Born: February 9, 1955 (age 71); New York City, U.S.
- Occupations: Animation historian; author; blogger; video producer
- Years active: 1980–present
- Board member of: ASIFA-Hollywood
- Spouse: Cheryl Chase (m. 2021)
- Awards: June Foray Award, 2008; Independent Publisher Book Award, 2014; Inkpot Award, 2015

Jerry Beck (born February 9, 1955) is an American animation historian, author, blogger, and video producer.

Beck has written or edited several books on classic American animation and classic characters, including Looney Tunes and Merrie Melodies: A Complete Illustrated Guide to the Warner Bros. Cartoons (with Will Friedwald, 1989), The 50 Greatest Cartoons (1994), The Animated Movie Guide (2005), Pink Panther: The Ultimate Guide to the Coolest Cat in Town! (2005), Not Just Cartoons: Nicktoons! (2007), The Hanna-Barbera Treasury: Rare Art Mementos from Your Favorite Cartoon Classics (2007), The 100 Greatest Looney Tunes Cartoons (2010), The Flintstones: The Official Guide to the Cartoon Classic (2011), and The SpongeBob SquarePants Experience: A Deep Dive into the World of Bikini Bottom (2013). He is also an authority on the making of modern films, with his books detailing the art of Mr. Peabody and Sherman, DreamWorks' Madagascar, and Bee Movie, as well an entertainment industry consultant for television and home entertainment productions and releases related to classic cartoons. He operates the blog Cartoon Research. He appears frequently as a documentary subject and audio commentator on releases of A&E's Cartoons Go to War as well as DVD/Blu-ray collections of Looney Tunes, Popeye the Sailor, and Woody Woodpecker cartoons, on which he serves as consultant and curator.

== Career ==
=== Writing ===
Early in his career, Beck collaborated with film historian Leonard Maltin on his book Of Mice and Magic: A History of American Animated Cartoons, Revised and Updated Edition (1980).

In 1987, Beck was instrumental in the creation of Animation Magazine. He went on to write for other magazines including: Variety, The Hollywood Reporter, The Whole Toon Catalog, Animation Blast, Animator, Wild Cartoon Kingdom and Animation World Network.

Beck wrote or edited several books on classic American animation and classic characters, including The 50 Greatest Cartoons (1994), The Animated Movie Guide (2005), Not Just Cartoons: Nicktoons! (2007), The Flintstones: The Official Guide to the Cartoon Classic (2011), The Hanna-Barbera Treasury: Rare Art Mementos from Your Favorite Cartoon Classics (2007), The SpongeBob SquarePants Experience: A Deep Dive into the World of Bikini Bottom (2013), Pink Panther: The Ultimate Guide (2005), and Looney Tunes and Merrie Melodies: A Complete Illustrated Guide to the Warner Bros. Cartoons (with Will Friedwald, 1989) alongside The 100 Greatest Looney Tunes Cartoons (2010). He is also an authority on the making of modern films, with his books detailing the art of Mr. Peabody and Sherman, DreamWorks' Madagascar, and Bee Movie.

In 2004, Beck and fellow animation historian and writer Amid Amidi co-founded the blog Cartoon Brew, which focused primarily on current animation productions and news. Beck sold his co-ownership in Cartoon Brew in February 2013 and started an IndieWire blog, Animation Scoop, for reports on current animation while continuing to write about classic animation at Cartoon Research.

=== Teaching ===
In the 1990s, Beck taught courses on the art of animation at UCLA, NYU, and The School of Visual Arts. Through 2018 he also taught animation history at Woodbury University in Burbank, California. As of 2020, Beck teaches in the Character Animation department of CalArts School of Film/Video and ANIM 3000 - History of Animation at MTSU.

=== Producing and consulting ===
Jerry Beck co-produced or was a consultant on many home entertainment compilations of Looney Tunes, MGM Cartoons, Disney Home Video, Betty Boop, and others.

In 1989, he co-founded Streamline Pictures and brought anime films, Akira, Vampire Hunter D, and Hayao Miyazaki's Castle in the Sky to the United States. He also compiled collections of cartoons from Warner Bros., Woody Woodpecker, and the Fleischer Studios.

As vice president of Nickelodeon Movies, he helped develop The Rugrats Movie (1998) and Mighty Mouse.

In 2006, Beck created and produced an animated pilot for Frederator Studios at Nickelodeon. That cartoon, Hornswiggle, aired on Nicktoons Network in 2008 as part of the Random! Cartoons series.

=== Volunteering ===
In 1993, Jerry Beck became a founding member of the Cartoon Network advisory board and he currently serves as Vice President of the ASIFA-Hollywood board.

=== Appearance on The Anime Business ===
Episode 9 of The Anime Business, a documentary interview series produced by AnimEigo, features Jerry Beck. The episode was released on October 27, 2025, on the AnimEigo YouTube channel and is hosted by Justin Sevakis. Beck discusses his early exposure to Japanese animation through UHF television broadcasts in New York, his subsequent work screening anime at comic book conventions, and his career in film distribution at studios including Orion Pictures and United Artists. He describes the 1987 World Animation Festival as a turning point, after which he and Carl Macek co-founded Streamline Pictures in 1989 to license Japanese animation for the American theatrical and home video markets. Titles distributed by Streamline included Akira, My Neighbor Totoro, and Kiki's Delivery Service. Beck also addresses the role of the video rental market in expanding the American audience for anime during this period, and references his work as an animation historian and author.

=== Speaking ===
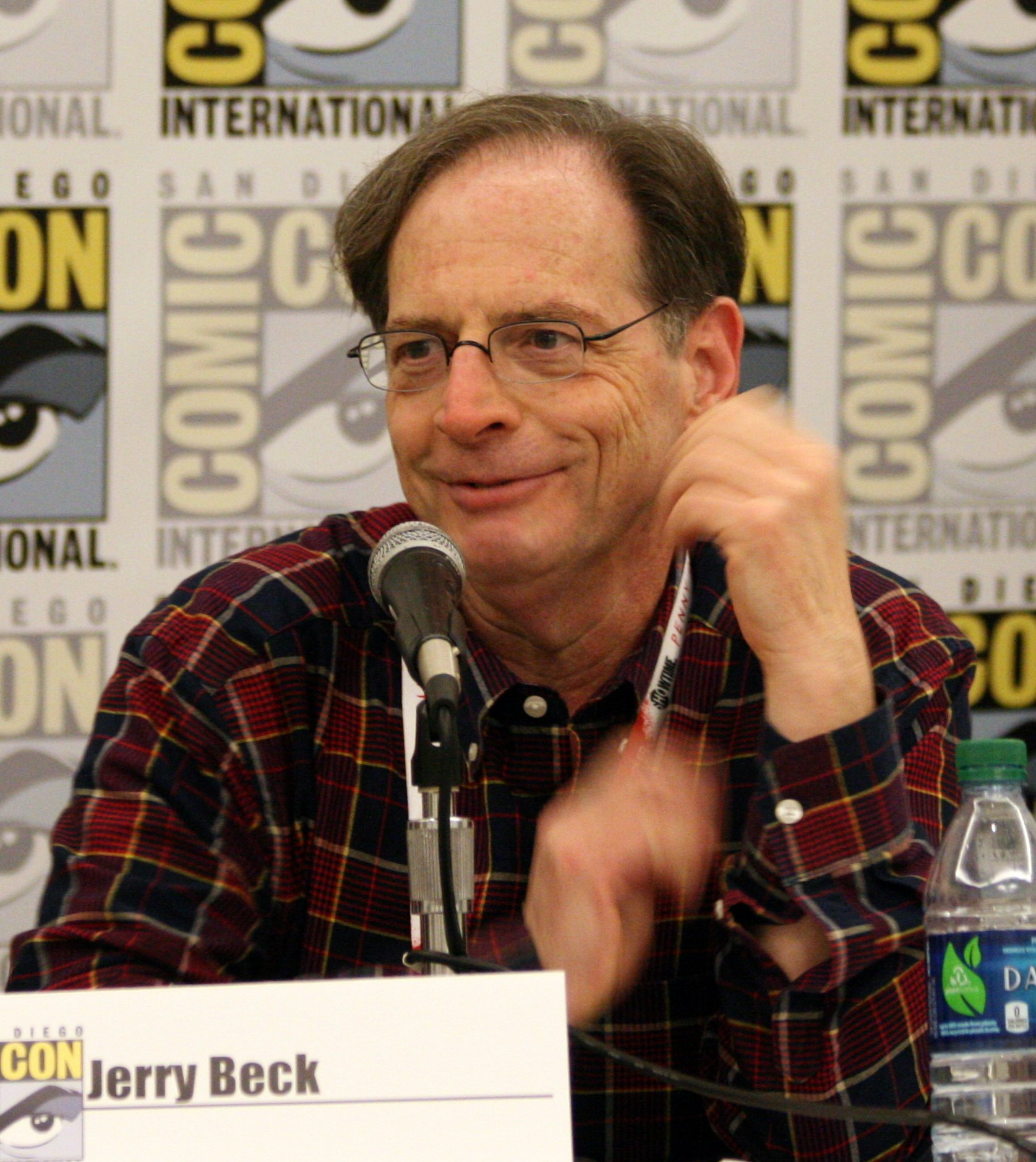
Beck at Comic-Con 2015

On a regular basis Beck moderates panels at various venues (festivals, conventions, premieres, museums, screenings, etc.) along with hosting programs/retrospectives of classic cartoons at same. In the past this included shows at the now shuttered Cinefamily and Cartoon Dump monthly live Hollywood performance.

His presentations include:

- Worst Cartoons Ever! program at San Diego Comic-Con
- Greatest Cartoons Ever! program the day after Christmas at the Alex Theatre (co-hosted by Frank Gladstone)
- Monthly Cartoon Club at the New Beverly Cinema
- A semi-annual show at the Old Town Music Hall

== Personal life ==
Beck attended John Bowne High School in Flushing, Queens, New York City. On June 25, 2021, he married voice actress Cheryl Chase, his girlfriend of 33 years.

== Bibliography ==
- Maltin, L. & Beck, Jerry (1980). Of Mice and Magic: A History of American Animated Cartoons. New York: Penguin.
- Friedwald, W., & Beck, Jerry. (1981). The Warner Brothers Cartoons. Metuchen, NJ: Scarecrow Press.
- Beck, Jerry, & Friedwald, W. (1989). Looney Tunes and Merrie Melodies: A Complete Illustrated Guide to the Warner Bros. Cartoons. New York, NY: Holt.
- Beck, Jerry. (1994). The Fifty Greatest Cartoons: As Selected by 1,000 Animation Professionals. Atlanta: Turner Pub.
- Beck, Jerry, & Friedwald, W. (1997). Warner Bros., Animation Art: The Characters, The Creators, The Limited Editions. Miami, FL: Warner Bros.
- Beck, Jerry. (2003). Looney Tunes: The Ultimate Visual Guide. London: Dorling Kindersley.
- Beck, Jerry. (2003). Outlaw Animation: Cutting-edge Cartoons From the Spike & Mike Festivals. New York: Harry N. Abrams.
- Beck, Jerry. (2004). Animation Art From Pencil Ti Pixel, The History of Cartoon Anime & CGI. Harper & Row.
- Beck, Jerry. (2005). Pink Panther: The Ultimate Guide to the Coolest Cat in Town. New York: DK Publishing.
- Sigall, M. & Beck, J. (2005). Forward for: Living Life Inside the Lines: Tales From the Golden Age of Animation. Jackson, MS: University Press of Mississippi.
- Beck, Jerry. (2005). The Animated Movie Guide/The Ultimate Illustrated Reference to Cartoon, Stop-motion, and Computer-generated Feature Films. Chicago: Chicago Review Press.
- Beck, Jerry. (2007). Nicktoons! New York, NY: Melcher Media.
- Beck, Jerry. (2007). The Art of Bee Movie. San Francisco: Chronicle Books.
- Cabarga, L. & Beck, J. (2007). Introduction for: Casper the Friendly Ghost. Milwaukie, Or.: Dark Horse.
- Cabarga, L. & Beck, J. (2008). Introduction for: Hot Stuff. Milwaukie, Or.: Dark Horse.
- Cabarga, L. & Beck, J. (2008). Introduction for: Baby Huey: The Baby Giant. Milwaukie, Or.: Dark Horse.
- Beck, Jerry. (2008). The Art and Making of Madagascar. San Rafael, CA: Insight Editions.
- Beck, Jerry. (2008). The Flintstones. San Rafael, CA: Insight Editions.
- Beck, Jerry. (2008). Tom and Jerry. San Rafael, CA: Insight Editions.
- Beck, Jerry. (2009). The Hanna-Barbera Treasury. San Rafael, CA: Insight Editions.
- Beck, Jerry. (2011). The Flintstones: The Official Guide to the Cartoon Classic. Philadelphia, PA: Running Press.
- Beck, Jerry. (2013). SpongeBob SquarePants Experience. Insight Editions, Div Of Palac.
- Beck, Jerry, (2014). Essay for: Felix the Cat Paintings: A Collection of Paintings From the Prolific Imagination of the Felix the Cat Guy. San Diego, CA: IDW Publishing.
- Beck, Jerry, Burrell, T., Ward, T., & Minkoff, R. (2014). The Art of Mr. Peabody & Sherman. San Rafael, CA: Insight Editions.
- Beck, Jerry, & Maltin, L. (2020). The 100 Greatest Looney Tunes Cartoons. San Rafael, CA: Insight Editions.

== Awards ==
In 2008, Beck was the recipient of the June Foray Award. In 2014, Beck received the Independent Publisher Book Award for Popular Culture. In 2015, Beck was the recipient of the Comic-Con International Inkpot Award. Beck was the 2019 honoree of the Los Angeles Animation Festival.
