= The TV Wheel =

The Xbox (later renamed TV Wheel) under construction. The single stationary camera is mounted in the center of the platform

The TV Wheel is a 1995 television pilot created by and starring Joel Hodgson, of Mystery Science Theater 3000 fame. The pilot was funded by cable network HBO, but they ultimately passed on picking up the show. The pilot episode eventually aired once on Comedy Central as a special presentation following the last new episode of MST3K to be broadcast on that network.

== Summary ==
The program is a sketch comedy show. A single stationary camera was mounted inside the center of a large rotating platform. As the platform rotated around the camera, a scene would come into view of the camera. The wheel would stop and a sketch would play out in the scene, which was often framed by some piece of appropriate artwork or prop (for the purposes of forced perspective). At the end of the scene, the wheel would rotate, carrying one scene out of the camera's view and bringing another in, and a new sketch would begin in the new scene. Some scenes were self-contained on the platform, while others were open to the studio beyond the platform (and additional action would take place in the background).

== Production ==
In early designs, the project was known as the "X-Box" (unrelated to Microsoft's later gaming system), and was designed as an X-shaped enclosure that would rotate around the camera.

Hodgson made an early test version of the program called The X-Box is Turning, a less polished show which featured different content than The TV Wheel. The test program, along with a brief documentary on the making of the X-Box, was offered for sale on VHS during Comedy Central's only broadcast of The TV Wheel.

A number of comedians and writers appeared on both The TV Wheel and The X-Box is Turning, including Morwenna Banks, Steve Bannos, David Cross, Paul Feig, Doug Benson, Melissa Samuels and Fred Stoller. In addition, Brian Posehn appeared in X-Box and Andy Kindler appeared in TV Wheel.
