= Ron Lynch (comedian) =

American actor and comedian

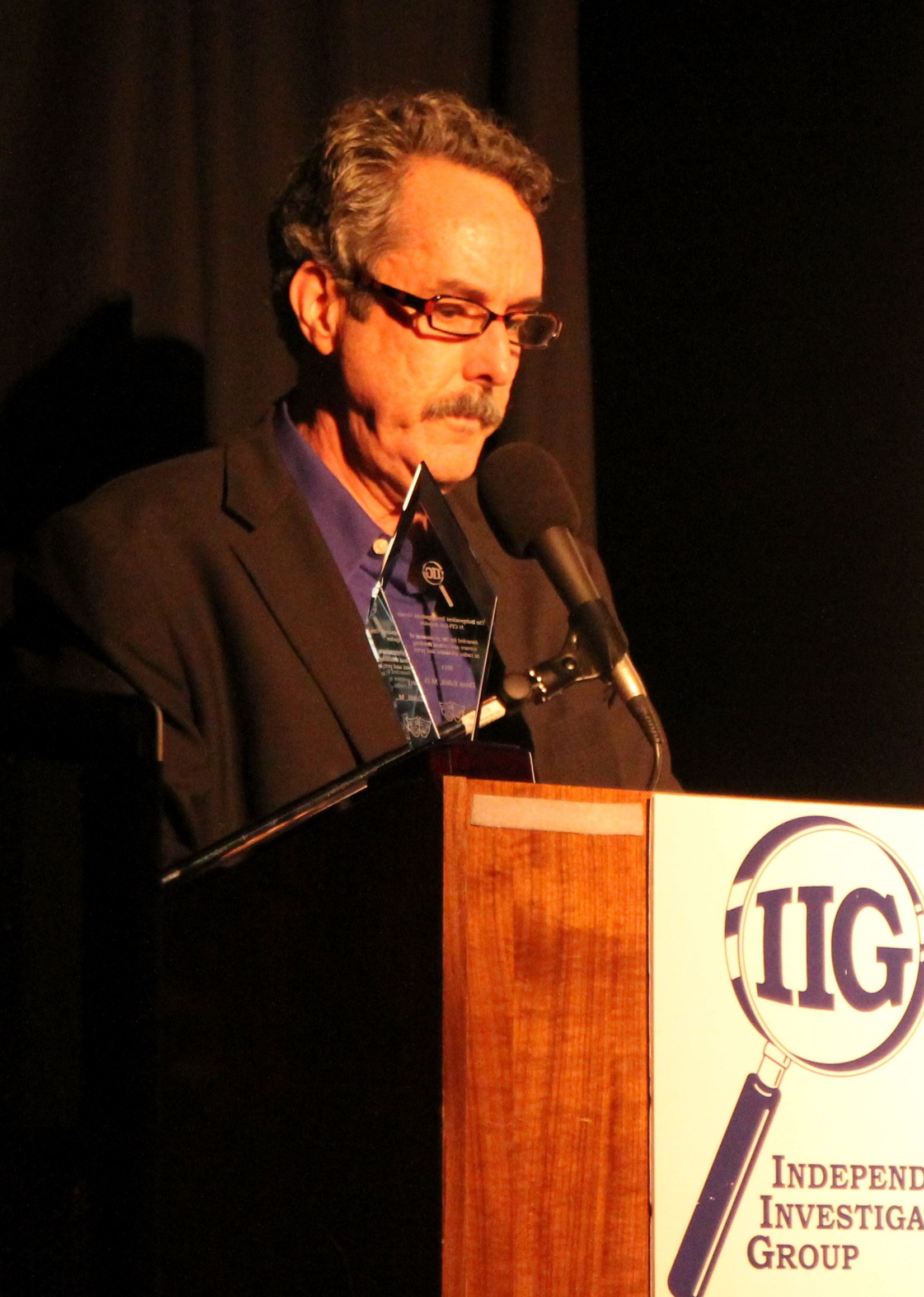
- Ron Lynch presenting at the IIG annual skeptic awards,
- Born: Astoria, Queens, New York, U.S.
- Occupations: Voice, film, television actor, comedian, writer
- Years active: 1978–present

Ron Lynch is an American stand-up comedian, actor, and writer. He has appeared in a number of movies and television shows, including Corporate, Corpse Tub, Another Period, Dope State, Comedy Bang! Bang!, and Portlandia.

He has worked as a voice actor for several animated shows, including Home Movies, Bob's Burgers, and Tom Goes to the Mayor, and has made guest appearances on Dr. Katz, Professional Therapist, The Sarah Silverman Program, Andy Richter Controls the Universe, Adventure Time, and Star vs. the Forces of Evil.

For over twenty years, Lynch has produced Tomorrow!, a weekly, live late-night comedy/variety show that has been called "a treasured comedy institution" in Los Angeles.

== Partial filmography ==
- Science Court (1997)
- Dr. Katz, Professional Therapist (1997-1998)
- Raising Dad (2001–2002)
- Andy Richter Controls the Universe (2003)
- Home Movies (1999–2004)
- Lovespring International (2006)
- Tom Goes to the Mayor (2004–2006)
- The Sarah Silverman Program (2007)
- Tim and Eric Awesome Show, Great Job (2007–2008)
- WordGirl (2007–2015)
- Bob's Burgers (2011–present)
- Adventure Time (2011–2018)
- Anyone Else But Me (2024)
