= Saturday Night Live season 21 =

Saturday Night Live
- Season 21
- No. of episodes: 20

Release
- Original network: NBC
- Original release: September 30, 1995 – May 18, 1996

Season chronology
- ← Previous season 20 Next → season 22

The twenty-first season of Saturday Night Live, an American sketch comedy series, originally aired in the United States on NBC between September 30, 1995, and May 18, 1996.

After the low ratings and negative reviews of the previous season, NBC executives necessitated significant changes for the show, including a major cast overhaul. Only five cast members from the previous season remained. New hires included Will Ferrell, Cheri Oteri, Darrell Hammond, Jim Breuer, David Koechner, and Nancy Walls. Chris Kattan and Colin Quinn joined as featured players.

== History ==
SNL faced new competition in the form of Fox's sketch comedy show MADtv, which aired a half hour earlier than SNL and featured a more diverse cast. Though MADtv never posed a serious ratings threat to SNL, it did at times beat the NBC show in the key demographic of twenty-and thirtysomething male audiences, and, to this day, online comments have been made about MADtv being a better sketch series than Saturday Night Live.

== Cast ==
Before the start of the season, most of the cast had left or been fired from the show. NBC West Coast President Don Ohlmeyer said, "If you look at the past several seasons, we haven't had breakout performers like Dana Carvey or Billy Crystal. In the writing, we haven't had many of the great characters that people have enjoyed seeing in sketches in the past. The cast had gotten too large and, frankly, some of them seemed to regard Saturday Night Live as what they did between theatrical films. The energy was off. Sometimes people seemed to be reading cue cards rather than doing a live show."

Four cast members originally returned from the previous season (Norm Macdonald, Mark McKinney, Molly Shannon and David Spade), though the number rose to five as Tim Meadows was asked to return despite being let go, as producers were unable to hire a new cast member of color. Spade’s return to the show had him in a limited role, very rarely appearing in sketches except for Spade in America, a segment hosted by Spade that debuted at the start of the season and was featured in all but five episodes. Shannon was upgraded to repertory status for this season.

Lenny Pickett also took over for G. E. Smith as leader of the Saturday Night Live Band.

Aside from Macdonald, McKinney, Meadows, Shannon, and Spade, the rest of the cast hired prior to the start of the season was entirely new. These included stand-up comedians Jim Breuer and Darrell Hammond; Groundlings alumni Will Ferrell and Cheri Oteri; and Chicago-based comedians David Koechner and Nancy Walls. Breuer, Hammond, Ferrell, Oteri, Koechner, and Walls were all promoted to repertory status upon being hired.

Ferrell and Oteri's fellow Groundling Chris Kattan, along with newly hired staff writer Colin Quinn, also joined as featured players for the final six episodes of the season. In April, Quinn's fellow SNL writer Fred Wolf was hired to join the cast as a featured player for the last four episodes. Kattan was credited for all six of the final episodes, while Quinn was credited for four, and Wolf was credited for three episodes. Newer cast members were restricted from filming movies during the season.

This would be the final season for longtime cast member Spade, who had been on the show since 1990, a total of six seasons. Spade had agreed to stay only a year so he could be a bridge between the old and new casts. Newcomers Walls and Keochner (the latter at the insistence of Ohlmeyer) were also let go after this season. McKinney was also on the chopping block, but was ultimately retained for the next season.

=== Cast roster ===
**Repertory players**

- Jim Breuer
- Will Ferrell
- Darrell Hammond
- David Koechner
- **Norm Macdonald**
- Mark McKinney
- Tim Meadows
- Cheri Oteri
- Molly Shannon
- David Spade
- Nancy Walls

**Featured players**

- Chris Kattan (first episode: March 16, 1996)
- Colin Quinn (first episode credited: March 16, 1996)
- Fred Wolf (first episode: April 13, 1996)

bold denotes "Weekend Update" anchor

Chris Kattan was credited for all six episodes after he joined the cast, Colin Quinn was credited for five of the last six shows of the season (including the season finale, despite not appearing in the episode), and Fred Wolf was credited for three of the last four episodes of the season.

== Writers ==
Jim Downey was removed as head writer as part of NBC executives' changes, but remained on the writing staff, now producing Weekend Update with Norm Macdonald.

Steve Higgins (who was made head writer with Fred Wolf), Adam McKay, Paula Pell, Frank Sebastiano, Hugh Fink, Dennis McNicholas, Harper Steele and Colin Quinn joined the staff.

The only returning writers from the previous season were Downey, Wolf, Tim Herlihy, Norm Hiscock, and Steve Koren. Koren (who would be promoted to writing supervisor midway through the season) would leave the show at the end of the season, after 4½ years.

== Episodes ==
No. overall	No. in season	Host	Musical guest	Original release date
387	1	Mariel Hemingway	Blues Traveler	September 30, 1995
Blues Traveler performs "Run-Around" and "Hook".; Jim Breuer, Will Ferrell, Darrell Hammond, David Koechner, Cheri Oteri and Nancy Walls' first episode as cast members.; As mentioned in the Spade in America sketch, the original musical guest scheduled to appear on this episode was Prince (back when he was known as "The Artist Formerly Known as Prince").
388	2	Chevy Chase	Lisa Loeb & Nine Stories	October 7, 1995
Lisa Loeb performs "Do You Sleep?" and "Stay (I Missed You)".; Mariel Hemingway appears during the "Braveheart" sketch.; Don Novello appears as Father Guido Sarducci during Weekend Update.
389	3	David Schwimmer	Natalie Merchant	October 21, 1995
Natalie Merchant performs "Wonder" with Jennifer Turner and "Carnival" with Turner and Katell Keineg.; Schwimmer's Friends co-stars Jennifer Aniston and Lisa Kudrow appeared in the opening monologue. Aniston also appeared during the Spade in America segment.; Gary Coleman, Jimmie Walker and Barry Williams also appear in the opening monologue.; Writer Colin Quinn appears as an extra in the "Standing in an Elevator" sketch.
390	4	Gabriel Byrne	Alanis Morissette	October 28, 1995
Alanis Morissette performs "Hand in My Pocket" and "All I Really Want".; Molly Shannon debuts her Mary Katherine Gallagher character.; Writer Colin Quinn appears in the opening monologue as a dancing potato.; Bill Bradley and Lamar Alexander appear during the cold open.; Tom Glavine, Chrissie Hynde, Chipper Jones and Mark Wohlers appear in a pre-recorded Spade in America segment.
391	5	Quentin Tarantino	The Smashing Pumpkins	November 11, 1995
The Smashing Pumpkins perform "Bullet with Butterfly Wings" and "Zero".; First Spartan Cheerleaders Episode.; Robert Hegyes appears during the Spade in America segment.
392	6	Laura Leighton	Rancid	November 18, 1995
Rancid performs "Roots Radicals" and "Ruby Soho".; Leighton's Melrose Place co-star Grant Show appears in the "Cydney" sketch.; Sam Waterston appears in the pre-recorded "Old Glory Insurance" sketch.; Sean Penn appears in a pre-recorded Spade in America segment, where he gives David Spade a tattoo.
393	7	Anthony Edwards	Foo Fighters	December 2, 1995
Foo Fighters perform "I'll Stick Around" and "For All the Cows".; Jim Breuer debuts his recurring sketch The Joe Pesci Show.
394	8	David Alan Grier	Silverchair	December 9, 1995
Silverchair performs "Tomorrow" and "Pure Massacre".; The most infamous Spade in America segment occurs on this episode. During the segment, Spade makes a joke about the flailing movie career of former SNL cast member Eddie Murphy, saying "Look kids, it's a falling star. Make a wish." This not only started a long standing feud between Spade and Murphy that lasted until 2011, but Murphy and Lorne Michaels that had seemly lasted up until the Saturday Night Live 40th Anniversary Special.
395	9	Madeline Kahn	Bush	December 16, 1995
Bush performs "Comedown" and "Glycerine".; Sam Waterston appears in the pre-recorded "Old Glory Insurance" sketch.
396	10	Christopher Walken	Joan Osborne	January 13, 1996
Joan Osborne performs "One of Us".; Rudolph Giuliani and George Pataki appeared in the cold open.
397	11	Alec Baldwin	Tori Amos	January 20, 1996
Tori Amos performs "Caught a Lite Sneeze" and "Hey Jupiter".; No Spade in America sketch.; Features the first Bill Brasky sketch.
398	12	Danny Aiello	Coolio	February 10, 1996
Coolio performs "1, 2, 3, 4 (Sumpin' New)" and "Gangsta's Paradise" (the latter with L.V.). He also appears in the "Kevin Franklin Show" sketch.; Chris Farley appears as a special guest during the "Spade in America" segment, promoting Farley and Spade's new film Black Sheep.; Larry Brown appears during Weekend Update.
399	13	Tom Arnold	Tupac Shakur	February 17, 1996
Tupac Shakur accompanied by Danny Boy and Roger Troutman performs "California Love" and "I Ain't Mad at Cha".; Adam Sandler appears during Weekend Update, singing a song about his grandmother.; No Spade in America sketch.
400	14	Elle Macpherson	Sting	February 24, 1996
Sting performs "Let Your Soul Be Your Pilot" and "You Still Touch Me".; Darrell Hammond filled in as announcer for an ailing Don Pardo (Hammond would later become the permanent announcer upon Pardo's death in 2014.); No Spade in America sketch.
401	15	John Goodman	Everclear	March 16, 1996
Credited Featured Players: Chris Kattan, Colin Quinn; Everclear performs "Santa Monica".; Elle Macpherson made a cameo appearance during the monologue.; Kurt Loder appears during the "MTV News" sketch.; No Spade in America sketch.; Chris Kattan and Colin Quinn's first episode as cast members.
402	16	Phil Hartman	Gin Blossoms	March 23, 1996
Credited Featured Players: Chris Kattan; Gin Blossoms perform "Follow You Down" and "Memphis Time".; Hartman impersonates Frank Sinatra.
403	17	Steve Forbes	Rage Against the Machine	April 13, 1996
Credited Featured Players: Chris Kattan, Colin Quinn, Fred Wolf; Rage Against the Machine performs one song, "Bulls on Parade". Their second song was cut after the band attempted to hang inverted U.S. flags from its amplifiers, protesting host Steve Forbes, a Republican presidential candidate.; Forbes' family appears onstage during the goodnights.; No Spade in America sketch.; Fred Wolf's first episode as a featured player.
404	18	Teri Hatcher	Dave Matthews Band	April 20, 1996
Credited Featured Players: Chris Kattan, Colin Quinn, Fred Wolf; Dave Matthews Band performs "Too Much" and "So Much to Say".; Sam Waterston appears in the pre-recorded "Old Glory Insurance" sketch.; The Spade in America sketch is performed by Teri Hatcher (as David Spade) and David Spade (as Teri Hatcher).
405	19	Christine Baranski	The Cure	May 11, 1996
Credited Featured Players: Chris Kattan, Colin Quinn; The Cure performs "Mint Car" and "In Between Days".; Dennis Rodman made a cameo appearance in the cold open as Bob Dole's running mate, and then once again during Weekend Update.; Jim Gaffigan appears during the pre-recorded "Fuzzy Memories" sketch.
406	20	Jim Carrey	Soundgarden	May 18, 1996
Credited Featured Players: Chris Kattan, Colin Quinn (did not appear), Fred Wolf; Soundgarden performs "Pretty Noose" and "Burden in My Hand".; First time "What Is Love" plays in the Roxbury Guys sketch as well as a third member's joining the brothers played by Jim Carrey.; Last episode for stage manager Joe Dicso, who had been in that position since the show's 1975 inception.; David Koechner, David Spade and Nancy Walls' final episode as cast members.

== Works cited ==
- Gross, Cristofer (June 1997). "Prime Time?". Orange Coast Magazine. pp. 51–52, 55–57.
