= List of Angie Tribeca episodes =

Angie Tribeca, titled Angie Tribeca: Special Division Force for its fourth and final season, is an American sitcom created by Steve and Nancy Carell. The series, a satire of police procedural shows, stars Rashida Jones as the titular police detective Angie Tribeca. It also stars Hayes MacArthur, Jere Burns, Deon Cole, Andrée Vermeulen, Kiersey Clemons, and Bobby Cannavale in supporting roles. The series was announced by TBS in mid 2014 with a ten-episode order. Angie Tribeca premiered on a 25-hour 10-episode marathon on January 17–18, 2016. It was renewed for a fourth and final season, after which 40 episodes had aired.

== Series overview ==
Season	Episodes	Originally released	
Season	Episodes	First released	Last released
1	10	January 17, 2016	January 18, 2016
2	10	June 6, 2016	August 8, 2016
3	10	April 10, 2017	June 12, 2017
4	10	December 29, 2018	December 30, 2018

== Episodes ==
=== Season 1 (2016) ===
No. overall	No. in season	Title	Directed by	Written by	Original release date	Prod. code	US viewers (millions)
1	1	"Pilot"	Steve Carell	Steve & Nancy Carell	January 17, 2016	100	1.17
Tribeca and her new partner Geils investigate an extortion attempt on the mayor. Guest appearances: Matthew Glave, Nancy Carell, Lisa Kudrow, Gary Cole
2	2	"The Wedding Planner Did It"	Michael Patrick Jann	Jeff Astrof	January 17, 2016	101	1.07
Tribeca and Geils investigate a string of baker murders. Guest appearances: Adam Scott, James Franco, Gillian Vigman
3	3	"The Famous Ventriloquist Did It"	Martha Coolidge	Alex Jenkins Reid	January 17, 2016	102	0.940
Tribeca and Geils investigate the death of a ventriloquist. Guest appearances: Sarah Chalke, Jeff Dunham
4	4	"The Thumb Affair"	Michael Patrick Jann	Ira Ungerleider	January 17, 2016	103	0.902
Tribeca and Geils investigate the theft of a Carpaccio MacGuffin painting called "The Thumb." Guest appearances: John Michael Higgins
5	5	"Commissioner Bigfish"	Peter Segal	Jason Belleville	January 17, 2016	104	0.733
Tribeca and Geils go undercover to bust a prostitution ring. Guest appearances: David Koechner, Amy Smart
6	6	"Ferret Royale"	Steve Pink	Ryan Walls	January 17, 2016	105	0.713
Tribeca and Geils investigate illegal pet ferrets being smuggled into California. Guest appearances: Keegan-Michael Key, Kerri Kenney-Silver
7	7	"Tribeca's Day Off"	Matt Sohn	Ava Tramer	January 17, 2016	106	0.628
After Tribeca and Geils try and fail to track down stolen diamonds at a Quinceanera, Tribeca is ordered to take some time off. Guest appearances: Bill Murray, Cecily Strong
8	8	"Murder in the First Class"	Richie Keen	Ira Ungerleider & Jeff Astrof	January 18, 2016	107	0.611
Tribeca and Geils investigate the murders of first-class airplane passengers. Guest appearances: Laura Bell Bundy
9	9	"Inside Man"	Jon Poll	Ava Tramer & Ryan Walls & Alex Jenkins Reid	January 18, 2016	108	0.515
Tribeca and Geils go undercover to infiltrate a gang of cockney crooks posing as chimney sweeps. Guest appearances: Gene Simmons, Danny Trejo
10	10	"The One With the Bomb"	Ira Ungerleider	Marisa Pinson	January 18, 2016	109	0.492
When Geils is kidnapped, it's Tribeca to his rescue. Guest appearances: John Gemberling, Ryan Hansen

=== Season 2 (2016) ===
No. overall	No. in season	Title	Directed by	Written by	Original release date	Prod. code	US viewers (millions)
11	1	"Fleas Don't Kill Me"	Ira Ungerleider	Ira Ungerleider	June 6, 2016	201	0.660
A year after the incident with the bomb, Angie tries to get her life back in order. Guest appearances: Vicki Lewis, James Franco and Jon Hamm
12	2	"Miso Dead"	Rachel Lee Goldenberg	Mathew Harawitz	June 6, 2016	202	0.574
Angie deals with the mental problems that she has been experiencing, while Jay and Scholls investigate the murder of a Japanese restaurant owner. Guest appearances: Busy Philipps and Rhys Darby
13	3	"Beach Blanket Sting-O"	Brennan Shroff	Shepard Boucher	June 13, 2016	203	0.613
A series of mysterious drownings force Geils to go undercover as a lifeguard, while Tribeca worries that he might be losing his real identity. Guest appearances: David Walton, Matthew Glave and Kevin Pollak
14	4	"You've Got Blackmail"	Steve Pink	Marisa Pinson	June 20, 2016	204	0.611
A massive conspiracy is set in motion after an extramarital dating website is hacked for seemingly vague reasons. Guest appearances: Heather Graham, Josh Meyers and Danny Pudi
15	5	"A Coldie but a Goodie"	Steve Pink	Juliet Seniff	June 27, 2016	205	0.569
Tribeca believes that a 102-year-old's death isn't as natural as everyone thinks, but her concerns aren't heard because of her probation. Guest appearance: Mary McCormack
16	6	"Organ Trail"	Dan Beers	Nathaniel Stein	July 11, 2016	206	0.601
Atkins assigns Geils and Tribeca a romance novelist to help in their attempt to bust an organ thief at a local hospital. Guest appearances: Maya Rudolph, James Franco, Eriq La Salle, Noah Wyle, Matthew Glave, Todd Luiso and Melanie Hutsell
17	7	"Boyz II Dead"	Matt Sohn	Sean Lavery	July 18, 2016	207	0.595
Geils and Tanner investigate the mysterious death of a boy band member; Tribeca finally meets with Sgt. Pepper, who seems to be connected to Mayhem Global. Guest appearances: James Franco, Heather Graham, Joey McIntyre, Saul Rubinek, Chris Kirkpatrick, Aaron Carter, Colton Dunn and Joe Jonas
18	8	"The Coast is Fear"	Rachel Lee Goldenberg	Scott Hanscom	July 25, 2016	208	0.444
A member of the Coast Guard is murdered, leading Tribeca and Geils to somehow connect it to Mayhem Global. Guest appearances: James Franco, Jonathan Frakes, Daniel Stern, Michaela Watkins, John Magaro and Craig Gellis
19	9	"Contains Graphic Designer Violence"	Dan Beers	Mathew Harawitz	August 1, 2016	209	0.542
A graphic designer is found dead, and all the evidence points to Tribeca as the perpetrator. Guest appearances: Mary McCormack, Josh McDermitt, Wayne Wilderson and Blake Lee
20	10	"Electoral Dysfunction"	Ira Ungerleider	Ira Ungerleider	August 8, 2016	210	0.481
Questions are answered and twists are explained in the conclusion to Season 2. Guest appearances: James Franco, Heather Graham, Matthew Glave, Nancy Carell, Peggy Lipton and Ed Begley Jr.

=== Season 3 (2017) ===
No. overall	No. in season	Title	Directed by	Written by	Original release date	Prod. code	US viewers (millions)
21	1	"Welcome Back, Blotter"	Rashida Jones	Ira Ungerleider	April 10, 2017	301	0.645
Angie retires to become a stay at home mom, but a trophy hunter goes missing and she's called back for the case. Guest appearances: Chris Pine, Timothy Omundson, Jessica St. Clair
22	2	"Murder Gras"	Ira Ungerleider	Shepard Boucher	April 17, 2017	302	0.560
Tribeca has a hunch that the trophy hunter hunter has struck again, this time in New Orleans. Guest appearances: Rob Riggle, Graham Rogers
23	3	"Brockman Turner Overdrive"	Dan Beers	Mathew Harawitz	April 24, 2017	303	0.572
When a beloved badminton star is the suspect of a hit-and-run, everyone turns a blind eye except Tribeca and Geils. Guest appearances: Andrew Bachelor, Nate Torrence, Randall Park
24	4	"Turn Me On, Geils"	Ira Ungerleider	Marisa Pinson	May 1, 2017	304	0.482
A brilliant robotics specialist is found dead in his lab, and the only one with insight into the case is the victim's magnetic assistant. Guest appearances: Michelle Dockery, Heather Graham
25	5	"This Sounds Unbelievable, but CSI: Miami Did It"	Brennan Schroff	Nathaniel Stein	May 8, 2017	305	0.663
A man falls from the sky, and the team investigates a lead in space. Guest appearances: Natalie Portman, Rob Huebel Note: The episode primarily spoofs the CSI: Miami episode "Miami, We Have a Problem".
26	6	"Hey, I'm Solvin' Here!"	Tom Magill	Juliet Seniff	May 15, 2017	306	0.552
When a middle-aged white man mysteriously dies in New York, the team goes to the Big Apple on Tribeca's hunch that the trophy hunter hunter has struck again. Guest appearances: Chris Pine, Rachel Dratch, Robert Pine, Constance Zimmer
27	7	"License to Drill"	Brennan Schroff	Scott Hanscom	May 22, 2017	307	0.557
Geils lands in trouble when he helps a woman investigate whether her husband is having an affair. Guest appearances: Jean Smart, Mary McCormack, Stephen Root, Jack McBrayer, Kelly Rohrbach
28	8	"If You See Something, Solve Something"	Rebecca Asher	Ira Ungerleider	May 29, 2017	308	0.553
A naked woman crawls out of a child's backpack and doesn't remember a thing. Geils and Tanner track down a murderer on the run from prison. Guest appearances: Lizzy Caplan, John Michael Higgins, Ana Ortiz
29	9	"Germs of Endearment"	Payman Benz	Mathew Harawitz	June 5, 2017	309	0.569
When an outbreak of a lethal virus threatens to liquify everyone in Los Angeles, the team realizes this might be the serial killer's magnum opus. Guest appearances: Ed Helms, Ernie Hudson, Rob Riggle, Yasiel Puig
30	10	"Go Get 'Em, Tiger"	Paul Bernard	Shepard Boucher & Marisa Pinson	June 12, 2017	310	0.508
People are still solid, but Dr. Scholls is missing and the serial killer is still on the loose; Lt. Atkins has a beautiful outdoor wedding. Guest appearances: Billy Gardell, Niecy Nash, Peggy Lipton, Chris Pine, Rob Riggle

=== Season 4: Special Division Force (2018) ===
No. overall	No. in season	Title	Directed by	Written by	Original release date	Prod. code	US viewers (millions)
31	1	"The Force Wakes Up"	Ira Ungerleider	Ira Ungerleider	December 29, 2018	401	0.433
After 20 years in prison, Angie is reunited with her old team and son, A.J., now part of the Special Division Force; the team's first assignment is to infiltrate a hospital to find a potential assassin of French Ambassador Pierre Cardin. Guest appearance: Eliza Coupe Note: This episode's plot primarily spoofs Grey's Anatomy, its title referencing The Force Awakens.
32	2	"Glitch Perfect"	Amy York Rubin	Marisa Pinson	December 29, 2018	402	0.257
Tribeca is undercover as a high school glee club coach to stop a highly prolific distributor of malware and computer exploits; but first, her glee club must come in first place at their final competition. Guest appearances: Isla Fisher, Dove Cameron Note: This episode primarily spoofs Glee.
33	3	"Joystick Luck Club"	Brennan Shroff	Nathaniel Stein	December 29, 2018	403	0.235
The team investigates an attack on popular Esports gamer Bondevil; A.J. is sent to join and infiltrate the QuarkSpark team, where he learns of a secret underground money laundering system within the Esports world. Guest appearances: Jimmy Tatro, Gillian Jacobs Note: This episode primarily spoofs A Few Good Men.
34	4	"Just the Fat, Ma'am"	Brennan Shroff	Greg Bratman	December 29, 2018	404	0.180
Tribeca is sent undercover to investigate a string of dead models from Popular Magazine; when the fingerprints on all of the bodies are discovered to belong to dead Peruvian men, the remainder of the team heads to Peru to investigate. Guest appearance: Anjelica Huston Note: This episode primarily spoofs The Devil Wears Prada.
35	5	"Trader Foes"	Rebecca Asher	Jessica Conrad	December 29, 2018	405	0.172
Angie and the team go undercover to infiltrate Lowercase Capital, a successful Wall Street-like corporation, in connection with the murder of an eccentric billionaire. Guest appearances: Jim Rash, Rose Byrne Note: This episode primarily spoofs Wall Street and The Wolf of Wall Street.
36	6	"Freezing Cold Prestige Drama"	Brennan Shroff	Scott Hanscom	December 30, 2018	406	0.450
In Fargo, S.D., the team is tasked with waiting for the arrival of a certain truck, the contents of which are unknown to the team; Charo and A.J. cover up an unfortunate incident which has ties to the mysterious arrival of the truck and the man pursuing it. Guest appearance: Tony Cavalero Note: This episode primarily spoofs Fargo Season 2 and No Country for Old Men.
37	7	"Behind the Scandalabra"	Tom Magill	Haley Di Guilio / Yael Green	December 30, 2018	407	0.278
The team is recruited by the vice president to cover up a Cabinet member's extramarital affair after the suitor mysteriously dies. Guest appearances: Gina Torres, Carl Reiner Note: This episode primarily spoofs Scandal.
38	8	"Heading to the Legal Beagle"	Phill Lewis	Marisa Pinson	December 30, 2018	408	0.250
The team works alongside a victim who is suing a popular law office for covering up negligence at FarmTech, a farming company with an alleged pesticide problem. Guest appearances: Phil Morris, John Michael Higgins, Harry Hamlin Note: This episode primarily spoofs Erin Brockovich.
39	9	"Irrational Treasures"	Ira Ungerleider	Nathaniel Stein	December 30, 2018	409	0.187
Atkins' family secret leads the team on a race across the country to beat Pierre Cardin in stealing the Louisiana Purchase. Note: This episode primarily spoofs National Treasure.
40	10	"Air Force Two"	Rashida Jones	Ira Ungerleider	December 30, 2018	410	0.221
After stealing the Louisiana Purchase and kidnapping Cardin, Tribeca and A.J. are wanted fugitives; Tribeca goes undercover one last time to expose Vice President Perry. Guest appearances: Kathryn Hahn, Carol Burnett Note: This episode primarily spoofs Face/Off and Air Force One.
