= Recurring Saturday Night Live characters and sketches introduced 1995–96 =

The following is a list of recurring Saturday Night Live characters and sketches introduced between September 30, 1995, and May 18, 1996, the twenty-first season of SNL.

== Get Off the Shed! ==
A Will Ferrell sketch. Ferrell is Frank Henderson, a dad who, although friendly most of the time, threatens his kids whenever they start climbing on his shed. In the first two appearances of the sketch, Frank is in his backyard making small talk with neighbors, Tom (David Koechner) and Susan Taylor (Nancy Walls). The conversation is punctuated by Frank's yells which become progressively heated. The second sketch is similar, but with host Christine Baranski playing Frank's wife who can yell equally loud. The third appearance was a variation on the idea, taking place at a Little League game where Frank and other parents are watching in the stands. Instead of yelling at his kid to get off the shed, Frank yells, "Get on the bag!" Debuted September 30, 1995.

Appearances

- Season 21, Episode 1 (September 30, 1995): with Mariel Hemingway as Shirley Henderson
- Season 21, Episode 19 (May 11, 1996): with Christine Baranski as Gail Henderson
- Season 24, Episode 19 (May 15, 1999): with Sarah Michelle Gellar as parent

== Leg Up ==
Molly Shannon impersonates Ann Miller and Cheri Oteri impersonates Debbie Reynolds, hosting a faux show about dancers. Debuted September 30, 1995.

Appearances

- Season 21, Episode 1 (September 30, 1995): with Mariel Hemingway as Elizabeth Berkley
- Season 21, Episode 5 (November 11, 1995): with Quentin Tarantino
- Season 21, Episode 9 (December 16, 1995): with Madeline Kahn as Ludmilla Veshenkova
- Season 21, Episode 16 (March 23, 1996): with Phil Hartman as Frank Sinatra

== Nightline ==
A parody of the late-night news program Nightline, with Darrell Hammond impersonating its host Ted Koppel. Debuted September 30, 1995.

== Spade in America ==
A David Spade segment where he gives his thoughts, guest interviews, and Hollywood Minute jokes. The segment aired only in season 21, which was Spade's last as a cast member. The segment makes up fifteen of Spade's nineteen sketch appearances in 1995–96. Debuted September 30, 1995.

Appearances

Episode	Host	Notes
September 30, 1995	Mariel Hemingway	
October 7, 1995	Chevy Chase	
October 21, 1995	David Schwimmer	Jennifer Aniston cameos.
October 28, 1995	Gabriel Byrne	Spade reports from the World Series. Cameos from Chrissie Hynde, Mark Wohlers, Tom Glavine, and Chipper Jones.
November 11, 1995	Quentin Tarantino	
November 18, 1995	Laura Leighton	Sean Penn cameos.
December 2, 1995	Anthony Edwards	
December 9, 1995	David Alan Grier	The infamous joke aimed at Eddie Murphy ("Look, kids, it's a falling star, make a wish!") occurs on this episode, which began a long-standing feud between Murphy and Spade.
December 16, 1995	Madeline Kahn	
January 13, 1996	Christopher Walken	
February 10, 1996	Danny Aiello	
March 23, 1996	Phil Hartman	
April 20, 1996	Teri Hatcher	Hatcher and Spade impersonate each other.
May 11, 1996	Christine Baranski	Spade spends a day with the British Fops (Mark McKinney and Dave Koechner).
May 18, 1996	Jim Carrey	

== Mickey the Dyke ==
A Cheri Oteri sketch. Mickey is a stereotypical butch lesbian who, despite identifying as a "dyke", is afraid to officially come out. Debuted September 30, 1995.

== Rita DelVecchio ==
Rita DelVecchio (Cheri Oteri) is a grouchy, sharp tongued, Italian-American, Brooklyn housewife. Rita hates it when the neighborhood kids' toys wind up landing in her front yard, so she claims the item for herself, saying, "I keep it!" and tells the kids to go away. Other times, Rita tries to one-up any of her neighbors when it comes to things like who has the best decorated front lawn on Christmas, or who has the better car. Debuted October 21, 1995.

Appearances

Season	Episode	Host	Notes
21	October 21, 1995	David Schwimmer	
21	January 13, 1996	Christopher Walken	
21	April 13, 1996	Steve Forbes	
22	October 26, 1996	Dana Carvey	
22	December 14, 1996	Rosie O'Donnell	
23	September 27, 1997	Sylvester Stallone	
23	November 22, 1997	Rudy Giuliani	

== Mary Katherine Gallagher ==
Mary Katherine (Molly Shannon) is a sardonic caricature of an unpopular, teenage Catholic school girl. She is prone to comically severe mood swings, alternately hyperactive and ponderous. She suffered from stage fright, but was also hyper-competitive (she once engaged in a sing-off with Whitney Houston) and egomaniacal, believing she was a "superstar". The sketch spawned in the 1999 film Superstar. Debuted October 28, 1995.

== The Spartan Cheerleaders ==
Craig Buchanan (Will Ferrell) and Arianna Prescott (Cheri Oteri) are overeager high school students who, despite not making the East Lake High School Spartan cheerleading squad, show up anyway, usually to events where cheerleaders would not normally be present, such as chess and bowling tournaments The pair's routines consisted of elaborate choreography and chants. The Spartans became one of the more popular recurring sketches of SNL's late-90s period, and were featured on the November 1997 cover of Rolling Stone alongside Mary Katherine Gallagher and Doug Butabi of The Roxbury Guys. Oteri and Ferrell came up with the idea for the Spartan cheerleaders when they were new to SNL and playing around on an empty 8H stage. Of the sketch, Oteri said, "One thing I like about [Arianna and Craig] is, they're losers, but they don't know it. I would feel sorry for them if they knew they were outcasts. They have no clue, thank God." Debuted November 11, 1995.

Appearances

Season	Episode	Host	Notes
21	November 11, 1995	Quentin Tarantino	The Spartans cheer at a football game.
21	December 16, 1995	Madeline Kahn	The Spartans at a basketball game.
21	January 20, 1996	Alec Baldwin	The Spartans at a chess tournament.
21	February 24, 1996	Elle MacPherson	The Spartans at a swim meet.
21	April 20, 1996	Teri Hatcher	Arianna and Craig face off with Gabrielle (Hatcher) at a math competition.
21	May 18, 1996	Jim Carrey	Lochmiel (Carrey) is the newest Spartan cheerleader at a wrestling competition.
22	September 28, 1996	Tom Hanks	Craig and Arianna are visited by the Spartan Spirit (Hanks) at a ping pong tournament.
22	November 16, 1996	Robert Downey Jr.	The Spartans encounter Dawson (Downey Jr.) at a bowling tournament.
22	December 14, 1996	Rosie O'Donnell	The duo meets Eileen McClasky (O'Donnell) while working seasonal jobs at a shopping mall.
22	February 8, 1997	Neve Campbell	Craig and Arianna go to a party thrown by Sidney Prescott (Campbell). Arianna is also revealed to be Sidney's cousin in this sketch.
22	April 19, 1997	Pamela Anderson	Craig and Arianna encounter C.J. Parker (Anderson) at the beach.
23	October 4, 1997	Matthew Perry	Craig and Arianna practice before Spartan team tryouts.
23	December 6, 1997	Nathan Lane	The Spartans have a dream. The Dallas Cowboys Cheerleaders make a cameo.
23	March 7, 1998	Scott Wolf	Craig and Arianna cheer outside a cinema showing of Titanic.
23	May 9, 1998	David Duchovny	Arianna and Craig attend cheerleading camp where they meet Dale Heavener (Duchovny). Paula Abdul cameos.
24	November 21, 1998	Jennifer Love Hewitt	The Spartans go to the maternity ward to cheer on mom in labor Alexis Murphy (Hewitt). Ad-Rock of the Beastie Boys makes an appearance.
25	December 4, 1999	Christina Ricci	Arianna and Craig cheer at a holiday parade with Gabby Malowski (Ricci).

== Stan Hooper ==
A Norm Macdonald character. In one sketch, Stan wakes up from a coma and is dismayed to learn that the two women who come to visit him—one beautiful and another frumpier—are respectively, his sister and wife. He tries to insist that the beautiful woman is his wife, despite protests from his actual wife. In another sketch, he is a sketch artist that draws composites of criminals that look nothing like the actual suspects. Debuted November 11, 1995.

== The British Fops ==
The British Fops, Lucien Callow (Mark McKinney) and Fagan (David Koechner), appeared in late Restoration-period clothing, and used a silly take on the period's language, mannerisms, and culture. The characters first appeared on Weekend Update as the presidents of the Norm Macdonald Fan Club, but later appeared in several other sketches and hosts' monologues. Debuted November 11, 1995.

Appearances

Episode	Host	Notes
November 11, 1995	Quentin Tarantino	Weekend Update appearance.
November 18, 1995	Laura Leighton	Appearance in opening monologue.
December 16, 1995	Madeline Kahn	Appearance in Antique Shop sketch.
January 20, 1996	Alec Baldwin	Appearance in opening monologue and in the Literary Theatre sketch.
February 24, 1996	Elle Macpherson	Weekend Update appearance.
May 11, 1996	Jim Carrey	Appearance on Spade in America segment.

== Joe Blow ==
A blue collar worker by trade, Joe Blow (Colin Quinn) came onto Weekend Update as a New York public service to deliver local news from Brooklyn, New York. Most of his "news" included family problems and neighborhood gossip. Joe Blow regularly concluded his commentary by asking anchor Norm Macdonald if he would join him for "a beer", which Macdonald (who clearly did not want to socialize with him) avoided by making up an excuse, or putting it off until a later date. Debuted November 18, 1995.

== Gary Macdonald ==
Gary Macdonald (David Koechner) was the fictitious younger brother of Weekend Update anchor Norm Macdonald. He was supposed to be the funnier of the two Macdonald brothers, but was overcome by fear and froze on camera, ending nearly everything he said with "no". Because of this, his commentary consisted of choppy, nervously delivered lines such as, "Hey, Janet Reno. Hey, how does that song go, 'dude looks like a lady' no." Debuted December 2, 1995.

== The Joe Pesci Show ==
This sketch starred Jim Breuer as Pesci, the host of his own late-night talk show, where he speaks in his signature high-pitched voice and frequently references his films like Goodfellas and Raging Bull. The heard-but-not-seen announcer was meant to be Pesci's "brother". The sketch usually began with Italian accordion music and Breuer cheerfully saying, "I've got my mike here, I've got my chair here, I've got my desk here, I've got my gun here!" A frequent guest is Robert De Niro, who is played by the host or another cast member. When other guests make a casual comment that Joe perceives to be a personal slight, Joe becomes enraged and brings out a baseball bat, which he beats the guest with as De Niro joins in on the beatdown. In the 17th episode of season 22, Pesci and De Niro themselves make cameo appearances and take offense to Breuer and Colin Quinn's impersonations of them. The real Pesci gets a baseball bat of his own and beats Breuer and Quinn with it. Debuted December 2, 1995.

Appearances

Season	Episode	Host	Joe's guests
21	December 2, 1995	Anthony Edwards	Macaulay Culkin (Edwards), Jim Carrey (Mark McKinney), Sharon Stone (Nancy Walls)
21	January 20, 1996	Alec Baldwin	Robert De Niro (Baldwin), Danny Glover (Tim Meadows), Mel Gibson (Mark McKinney), Spider (Will Ferrell), Brad Pitt (David Spade)
21	March 16, 1996	John Goodman	Robert De Niro (Goodman), Marisa Tomei (Cheri Oteri), Richard Dreyfuss (Darrell Hammond)
21	May 18, 1996	Jim Carrey	Jimmy Stewart (Carrey), Jim Carrey (Mark McKinney)
22	November 23, 1996	Phil Hartman	Frank Sinatra (Hartman), Michael Jackson (Tim Meadows), Debbie Rowe (Molly Shannon)
22	January 11, 1997	Kevin Spacey	Al Pacino (Spacey), Dennis Rodman (Tim Meadows), Rodney Dangerfield (Darrell Hammond)
22	April 12, 1997	Rob Lowe	Robert De Niro (Colin Quinn), David Spade (Chris Kattan), Eric Roberts (Lowe). The real Pesci and De Niro make cameo appearances.
23	November 22, 1997	Rudy Giuliani	Giulani plays himself. Spider (Will Ferrell) and Marion Barry (Tracy Morgan) appear.

== G-Dog ==
A 1990s sitcom about a bald-headed, foul-mouthed gangsta rapper played by Tim Meadows who usually appeared wearing only a Speedo or leather pants. He first appeared in a sketch with Anthony Edwards. His other appearance was in a sitcom called "The Princess and the Homeboy" with Teri Hatcher. Debuted December 2, 1995.

== Lenny the Lion ==
Visiting from the Bronx Zoo, Lenny the Lion (Colin Quinn in a lion suit) came onto Weekend Update to talk about his life problems. His accent and set of problems (including a violent father, a chaotic family situation and an addiction to tranquilizer darts) are meant to suggest an ethnic working-class man in the Bronx. Lenny always ended his rant with the line "fur is murder". Debuted December 9, 1995.

== The Rocky Roads ==
A Will Ferrell, Tim Meadows, and David Alan Grier sketch. The Rocky Roads are a motivational troupe who perform for elementary school kids (think the Wiggles). They demonstrate moral lessons to kids through song and dance, often referencing candy. Their songs sometimes contain innuendo (for instance, "Honky cracker!"), which makes the person who introduces them at the start of the sketch nearly regret hiring them (as proven by cutaways during the second-to-last song they perform). The sketch appeared in both episodes hosted by Grier. Debuted December 9, 1995.

== Gerald "T-Bones" Tibbons ==
A David Koechner sketch. Debuted January 13, 1996.

== Bill Brasky ==
A Will Ferrell, David Koechner, Mark McKinney, and Tim Meadows sketch. The format of the sketches resembles the improv game "Two Describe a Third". Three or four businessmen, known as the "Bill Brasky Buddies", are crowded into the bar during a business conference, drunk on Scotch. They smoke cigars and loudly reminisce about their mutual acquaintance Bill Brasky, known for mythical, superhuman feats. The Brasky Buddies all have red cheeks, red noses, and big white teeth. Debuted January 20, 1996.

Appearances

Season	Episode	Host	Notes
21	January 20, 1996	Alec Baldwin	Airport bar.
21	March 16, 1996	John Goodman	Holiday Inn.
22	February 22, 1997	Alec Baldwin	Bill Brasky's funeral.
22	May 10, 1997	John Goodman	Little League game.
24	December 12, 1998	Alec Baldwin	Bull & Bear. John Goodman cameos.
39	December 7, 2013	Paul Rudd	Chuck E. Cheese. This is the only Bill Brasky sketch in which Tim Meadows does not appear.

== Kevin Franklin ==
A Tim Meadows sketch. Two characters played by Meadows named "Kevin Franklin" appeared in two separate sketches, but they seem very vaguely related to each other.

In the first sketch, Kevin Franklin hosts his own talk show where he "discusses the issues people are talking about". In the February 10, 1996 episode where the sketch debuted, Franklin interviewed guest host Danny Aiello and musical guest Coolio. He accused Aiello of stealing a role from a black actor for his part in Do the Right Thing and claimed to Coolio that rap music is dead, having peaked a decade ago when "The Fat Boys were in their heyday".

The second sketch features a totally different "Kevin Franklin Show", with a promo divided in two parts: The first shows him pitching his talk show on UPN, which he claims will be "different from the other black talk shows". The joke comes in the second part, which reveals that he's thrown his former self away after sobriety and has decided to retool his show into "Discovering Faith", in which he details his journey of straying away from his pre-sober self.

== Suel Forrester ==
A Chris Kattan sketch. In each appearance by Suel Forrester he has a different occupation in which good, articulate clarity of speech is very important (a teacher, a trial attorney, an air traffic controller), yet he speaks almost entirely in unintelligible gibberish. For instance, in his debut sketch (where he's a substitute teacher), "Okay! Since it's Tuesday, we're gonna have ourselves a little pop quiz!", filtered through his babbling, comes out like "Okay! Sisihstuesday, wegonhavasavalil pup-kih!", which the students confuse for "pumpkin" ("Yeah, 'pumpkin', that's so funny", mocks Forrester). Sometimes, he does speak coherently (for instance, in the first sketch, when he asks students questions, one student played by Nancy Walls has her questions spoken perfectly, which causes her to get an A on the pop quiz she was given). Debuted March 16, 1996.

Appearances

Season	Episode	Host	Notes
21	March 16, 1996	John Goodman	Substitute teacher
21	April 13, 1996	Steve Forbes	Drill sergeant
22	October 5, 1996	Lisa Kudrow	Air traffic controller
22	February 8, 1997	Neve Campbell	Game show host
22	May 10, 1997	John Goodman	Host of Talkin' with Suel
23	November 14, 1998	Joan Allen	Southern lawyer. John Goodman cameos.
25	March 13, 1999	Ray Romano	Basketball coach
26	March 17, 2001	Julia Stiles	Old Hollywood acting coach

== The Roxbury Guys ==
A satire of nightclubs and clubbing culture. It followed the exploits of brothers Doug and Steve Butabi (portrayed by Chris Kattan and Will Ferrell respectively), habitual clubbers dressed in rayon suits, as they attempt to pick up women on their outings. Their trademark was bobbing their heads in unison to the song "What Is Love" by Haddaway, which always played throughout the duration of each sketch. The brothers were extremely unfortunate with the women at the clubs, often gyrating against them in an attempt to get them to dance, but always causing a negative reaction. They were frequently joined by a third person, often the host, who dressed and acted in a similar fashion (notably Tom Hanks, Jim Carrey, Sylvester Stallone, Martin Short, and Alec Baldwin); this character was usually credited as "Barhop". Skits starring Pamela Anderson and Cameron Diaz were also featured. The sketch spawned the 1998 film A Night at the Roxbury. Debuted March 23, 1996.

The Roxbury Guys were created during Kattan and Ferrell's days as members of The Groundlings. On the creation of the characters, Kattan explained, "Will and I were at this bar in Santa Monica, and there was a guy who was just kind of lightly bopping, but not to the degree we exaggerate it. He was definitely looking for somebody. It wasn't specific – kind of a desperate 'anybody.' Like, 'Please look at me, please dance with me.' But he wasn’t actually asking anyone to dance – it was more like, 'Would somebody notice me, please?'"

Appearances

Season	Episode	Host	Notes
21	March 23, 1996	Phil Hartman	
21	May 18, 1996	Jim Carrey	Third Roxbury Guy is played by host. This is the first time "What Is Love" by Haddaway plays during the sketch.
22	September 28, 1996	Tom Hanks	Host is third Roxbury Guy.
22	December 7, 1996	Martin Short	Host is third Roxbury Guy.
22	February 22, 1997	Alec Baldwin	Host is third Roxbury Guy.
22	April 19, 1997	Pamela Anderson	Anderson is a woman the Roxbury Guys encounter at a sauna.
23	September 27, 1997	Sylvester Stallone	Stallone plays Rocky Balboa.
23	December 13, 1997	Helen Hunt	The Roxbury Guys meet with a therapist (Hunt) after another unlucky night out. Jack Nicholson cameos.
24	September 26, 1998	Cameron Diaz	The guys run into the Festrunk Brothers (Dan Aykroyd and Steve Martin in cameo appearances).

== Bobby Coultsman ==
A Phil Hartman sketch about an overbearing, self-obsessed acting class teacher. Debuted March 23, 1996.

== Goat Boy ==
Goat Boy (Jim Breuer) was a half-human half-goat hybrid who hosted the fake MTV show, "Hey, Remember the 80s?" At the outset, Goat Boy was a typical veejay-talk show host who introduced '80s video clips and guests from the era. During the sketches, he started braying and kicking and was subdued by scientists standing by with electric prods. Debuted May 11, 1996.

Appearances

Season	Episode	Host	Notes
21	May 11, 1996	Christine Baranski	Goat Boy sings 1980s hit songs.
22	September 28, 1996	Tom Hanks	Hanks plays Andrew Ridgeley (credited here as "the other guy from Wham!") on Hey, Remember The 80s?
22	October 26, 1996	Dana Carvey	Carvey plays George Michael on Hey, Remember The 80s?
22	December 14, 1996	Rosie O'Donnell	A Christmas greeting from Goat Boy.
22	February 15, 1997	Chevy Chase	Goat Boy is on The Charlie Rose Show.
22	April 19, 1997	Pamela Anderson	Anderson plays Jenny McCarthy on Hey, Remember the 80s?
23	October 4, 1997	Matthew Perry	Goat Boy gives a press conference on MTV News with Willie Nelson (Will Ferrell) and Julio Iglesias (Perry).
23	February 28, 1998	Garth Brooks	Brooks plays Kevin Rowland on Hey, Remember the 80s?
23	April 4, 1998	Steve Buscemi	Goat Boy appears during the multiple broadcasts.
23	May 9, 1998	David Duchovny	Goat Boy meets another goat boy on Oprah.

== Rolf ==
A Colin Quinn character. Rolf is a criminal (in one sketch an inmate, another a German Nazi) who gossips about others. In the March 15, 1997 episode with Sting, Rolf is a KKK member who questions the Klan. Debuted May 11, 1996.

Preceded by Recurring Saturday Night Live characters and sketches introduced 1994–95	Recurring Saturday Night Live characters and sketches (listed chronologically)	Succeeded by Recurring Saturday Night Live characters and sketches introduced 1996–97
