= Mango (Saturday Night Live) =

- Saturday Night Live character
- Chris Kattan as Mango with Horatio Sanz and Tracy Morgan
- First appearance: October 18, 1997 (S23E03)
- Last appearance: May 18, 2002 (S27E20)
- Created by: Chris Kattan
- Portrayed by: Chris Kattan

In-universe information
- Gender: Male
- Title: Mango
- Occupation: Exotic dancer
- Family: Guava, father (Danny DeVito)
- Spouse: Mrs. Mango (Molly Shannon)
- Nationality: Mango Island

Mango is a character performed by Chris Kattan on the American sketch comedy show Saturday Night Live. Mango is a male exotic dancer who performed in a strip club. Kattan drew inspiration for the Mango character from actress Marlene Dietrich in the 1930 film The Blue Angel. Actors and guest hosts appearing on the program would become infatuated and drawn to Mango. These included David Duchovny, Ellen DeGeneres, Garth Brooks, and Cuba Gooding Jr.

Mango was received favorably in commentary and reflections on the history of Saturday Night Live. Rocky Mountain News posited the character helped popularize the word mango itself in American households. Comedian Jim Downey placed Mango among the top 10 most frequent sketches in the history of Saturday Night Live. Michael Musto wrote that Mango was "etched into our memories" by Kattan's performances. Entertainment Weekly placed the hosting job of Garth Brooks on Saturday Night Live among the top ten best in history, due to "his surprising chemistry with Chris Kattan's Mango". The Houston Chronicle placed Mango's debut with actor Brendan Fraser among "The 50 greatest 'Saturday Night Live' skits of all time". The Art of Comedy placed Mango among "some of the greatest characters" from the series.

== Writing and development ==
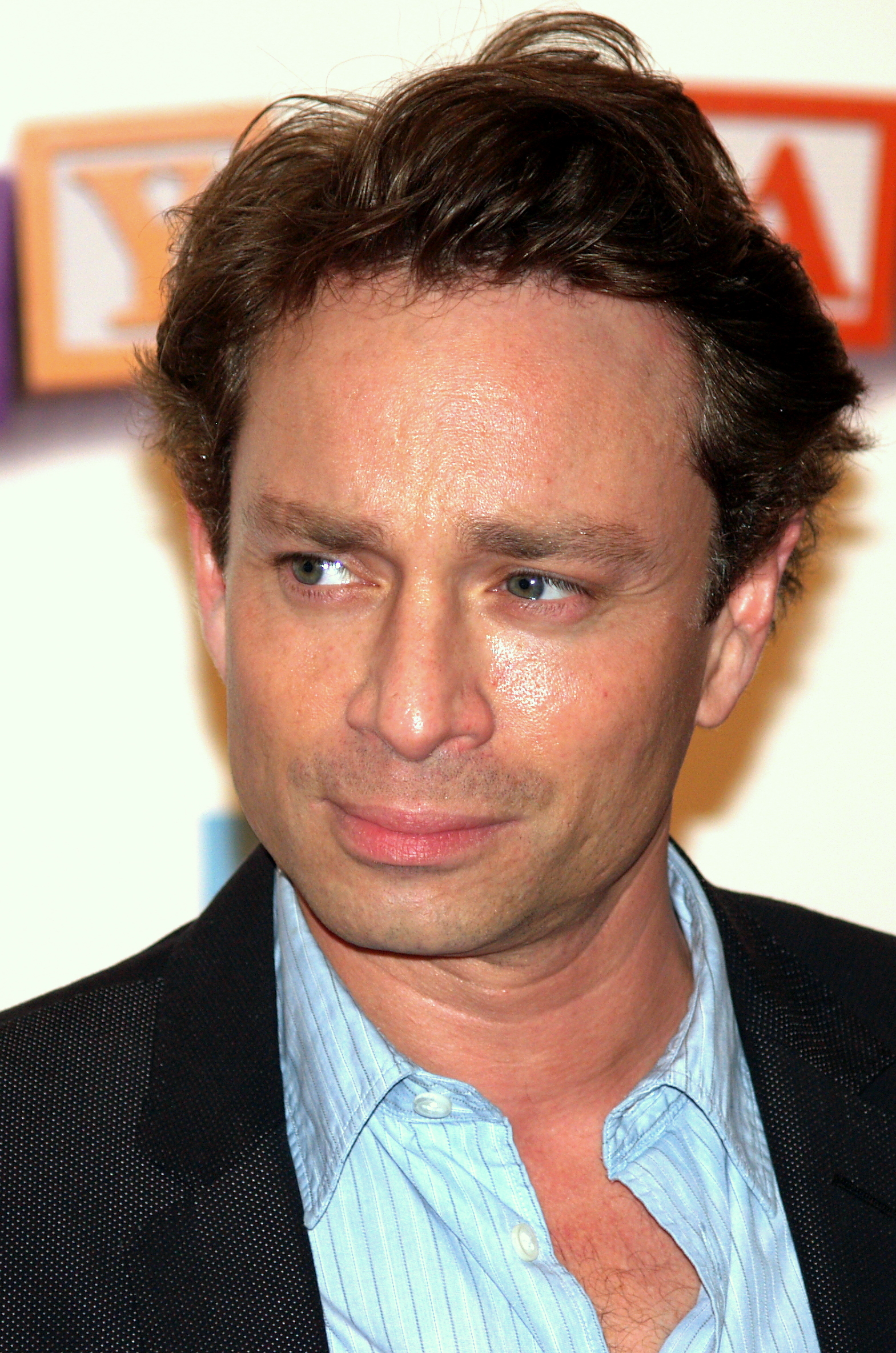
Chris Kattan based the Mango character on an ex-girlfriend, his Dalmatian, and the song "Missing" by the band Everything but the Girl.

Chris Kattan based the Mango character from a combination of his Russian ex-girlfriend, his Dalmatian Winnie, the song "Missing" by the band Everything but the Girl, and an actual performer he met in a strip club, named Mango. Kattan developed the character initially with writer Scott Wainio, for a sketch with guest host actor Brendan Fraser. Kattan stated in the book Live From New York, "The character of Mango was actually kind of based on an ex-girlfriend. There was a manipulation to her that was incredibly charming." He explained her comedic appeal, "And the joke was that she was a bad dancer but for some ungodly reason, men just fell for her." Kattan developed the character as an androgynous person.

Kattan said he was inspired by the character Lola Lola portrayed by actress Marlene Dietrich in the 1930 the film, The Blue Angel. The character debuted on Saturday Night Live on episode three of season 23 on October 18, 1997. Kattan stated his mother did not appreciate the character, telling him it was "too fruity". Kattan recalled being pleased when at a Halloween party in Los Angeles multiple individuals decided to dress up in costume as Mango.

The television series Biography captured the transformation of Kattan into Mango for a special two-hour episode of Saturday Night Live, as part of its documentary production about the history of the program. Regular appearances of the Mango character on Saturday Night Live formally ended with Kattan's 2003 departure from the show. He appeared on 16 Saturday Night Live episodes between 1997 and 2002.

== Character appearance ==
Mango is presented in Saturday Night Live as a man who works as an exotic dancer and stripper. The character is proficient in go-go dancing. He acts in public with a feminine style of personal attitude. His attire includes fuchsia garments that are too small for his frame, a pink top, gold shorts, and a sparkling beret cap. His wife is portrayed by actress Molly Shannon. He works as an exotic dancer in order to provide food for his children and family. His manner of speech includes a Hispanic type of accent, and he speaks about himself to others in the third person. His nationality was left ambiguous. He describes his appeal to others, stating, "If you start out using Mango, it will only lead to more Mango." Mango's oft-used catchphrase was, "You can't have the Mango."

All those persons who encounter Mango end up becoming in love or infatuated with him, regardless of their gender or sexual orientation.Some who fell under Mango's spell include a gang leader portrayed by Samuel L. Jackson, as well as actors David Duchovny, Ellen DeGeneres, Garth Brooks, and Cuba Gooding Jr. Others who fell for Mango's charms on Saturday Night Live included actor Tom Berenger, actress Bea Arthur, the actors from the show Steel Magnolias, and physician Deepak Chopra.

Mango himself was shown to be attracted to actress and singer Jennifer Lopez. Lopez and Mango get into conflict when he is shown to be more famous than her. They appear together in a film shoot for a music video by Lopez. The director proclaims to Mango, "You're gonna be bigger than Jennifer Lopez!" Lopez appears offended, and the two engage in a physical altercation.

Mango had an infatuation with actor Matt Damon, and on a subsequent program, Ben Affleck falls in love with Mango and appears as an impostor of Damon in order to attempt to woo Mango as his own conquest. Country music singer Garth Brooks appeared proclaiming his desires for Mango while the character was outfitted in a leopard-print costume. Monica Lewinsky was planned to be shown as Mango's spouse on an episode, but the host of Saturday Night Live for that week was actor Cuba Gooding Jr. and he canceled the initiative. Gwyneth Paltrow portrayed Mango's love interest from high school when she guest hosted the show in 2001. The last sketch with Mango was an appearance with actress Winona Ryder where they were shopping together.

== Post-Saturday Night Live ==
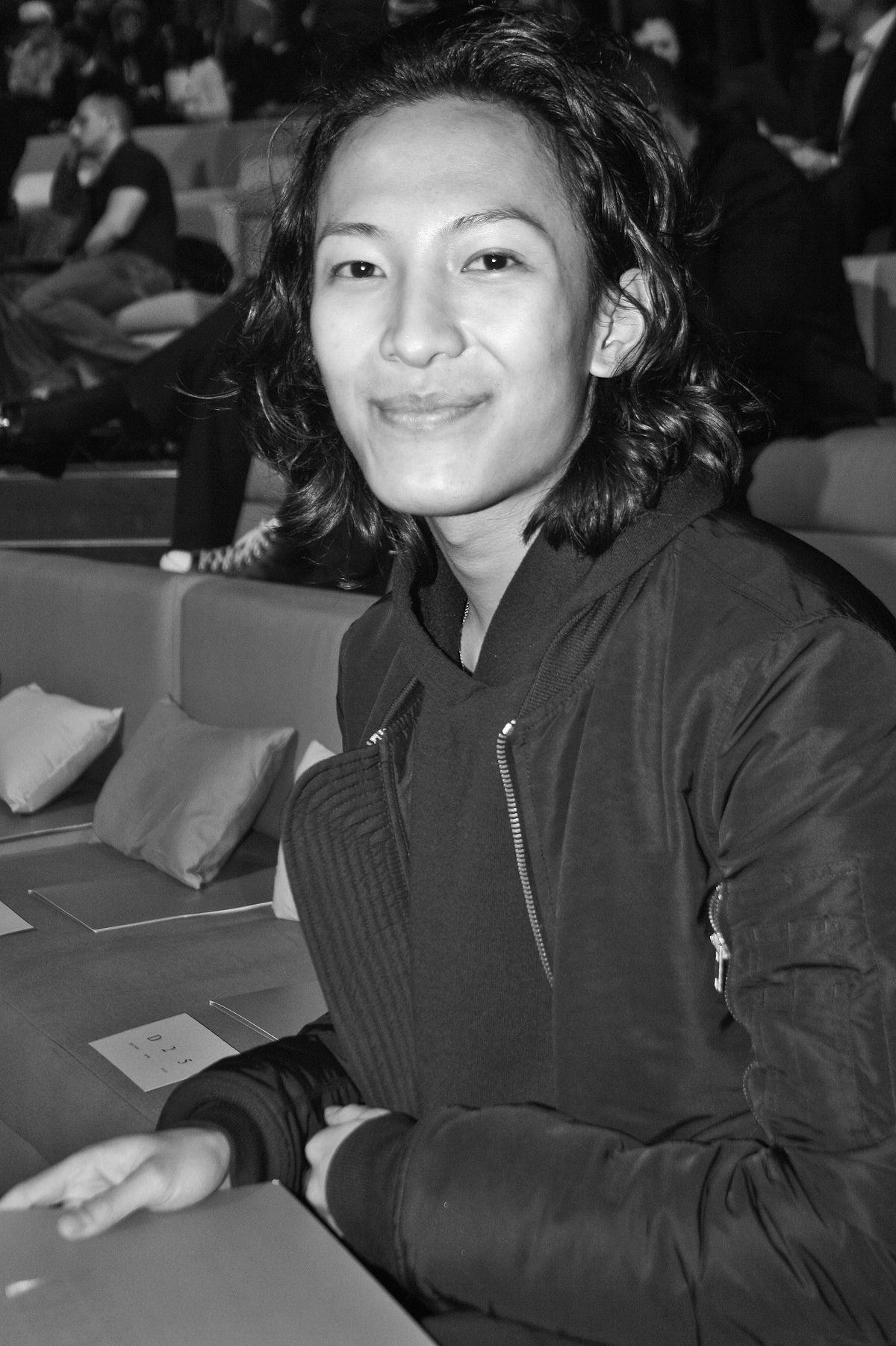
Alexander Wang recruited Chris Kattan to reprise his role of Mango in 2014, in a special appearance for the 2014 T by Alexander Wang fashion campaign.

In June 2014, Mango was featured in a preview of Missy Elliott protégée Sharaya J's "Shut It Down" via a T by Alexander Wang campaign. He also did a video on the designer's YouTube account. Wang had Mango as his invited guest at the 2014 CFDA Fashion Awards. The Los Angeles Times commented of his appearance at the awards show in-character, "actor Chris Kattan looked like he was auditioning for Cabaret in his louche black shorts as he reprised his SNL character Mango." Wang commented, "I've always loved Mango's character from SNL". Wang observed, "Sometimes when fashion becomes too stiff, it's great to have someone such as Mango come through and inject a new burst of energy. Having fun and a sense of humor is so important to me that when I'm able to incorporate it into my work, I run with it."

Saks Fifth Avenue collaborated with Wang, and sold "Alexander Wang's Mango shorts" in its "Live From New York" collection with assistance from costume designer for Saturday Night Live, Tom Broecker. Entertainment Weekly placed "Alexander Wang's Mango shorts" as number 2 on its list of top seven most ridiculous items from Saturday Night Live sold by Saks Fifth Avenue. In the video produced for Wang, Mango appears again portrayed by Kattan, with his personal assistant, Rudy, portrayed by former National Hockey League player Sean Avery. Fashion model Behati Prinsloo appears in the Wang video as well, along with reality television celebrity Sonja Morgan and reporter Derek Blasberg.

Mango's story picks up explaining he had been residing with his pet Shih Tzu, Constance, together in a "Fortress of Mango-hood", in the Arctic Circle. Mango explains he rejected the romantic advances of both Angelina Jolie and Brad Pitt. Mango asserts that the dog is his "sober companion" therapy animal. He is coaxed back to New York City by Alexander Wang, to help with his fashion show, where he receives dancing instruction from choreographer Sharaya J. Mango is still shown to have attractive charisma to all those he encounters. Harpers Bazaar placed the video Mango for T by Alexander Wang at number nine on its list of "The 17 Best Fashion Short Films of the Year". Subsequently in 2017, when Kattan appeared on Dancing with the Stars alongside professional dancer Witney Carson, their team came to be known as "TeamMangoTango".

== Reception ==
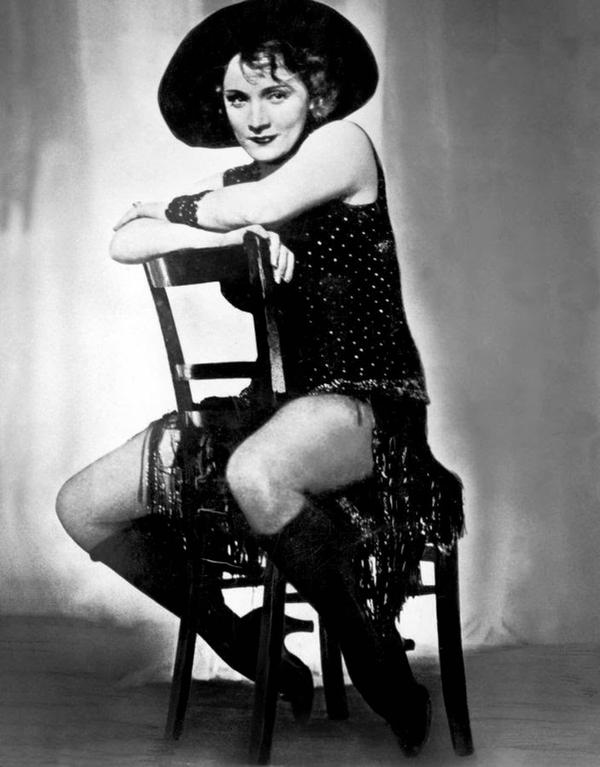
Actor Chris Kattan drew inspiration for the Mango character from actress Marlene Dietrich in the 1930 film The Blue Angel — The Washington Post called Dietrich the "spiritual godmother" of Mango.

Writing for Rocky Mountain News, journalist Marty Meitus commented on the popularity of the character, "Contrary to popular belief, Saturday Night Live did not make the name mango a household word. Or maybe it did." The New York Observer wrote of Kattan's work with the character that he received, "big laughs ... as Mango, the exotic dancer who is infinitely attractive to both men and women. Even Garth Brooks has taken part in a Mango sketch, pledging his love to the ambisexual, leopard-print-wearing maniac." The Star Tribune called him a "high energy character" that was "a welcome breath of stinky air" on Saturday Night Live.

Writing for The Washington Post in 2001, Michael O'Sullivan called actress Marlene Dietrich the "spiritual godmother" of the Mango character from her portrayal of Lola Lola from the Josef von Sternberg directed 1930 film The Blue Angel.

The New York Times called Mango the actor's "signature character". In his 2002 book on the history of NBC, author Marc Robinson wrote in his work Brought to You in Living Color, "Chris Kattan's high-strung exotic dancer, Mango, has been the 'fantasy' of many an SNL guest host, male and female." Reflecting back on the material in Live From New York (2002), comedian and Saturday Night Live, writer Jim Downey placed Mango among the top 7-10 frequent recurring sketches from the total history of the television series.

The Los Angeles Times commented on the ambiguous sexual nature of the character, "As Mango, Kattan played a simian-human hybrid of ambiguous sexuality who had the power to seduce straight men. Kattan's Mango moved in a highly ostentatious way – a cross between a gay man and a meerkat." Out journalist Michael Musto wrote, "Chris Kattan is best known for wacky characters like Mango, the slithering multisexual go-go dancer he etched into our memories on Saturday Night Live." Writing in his 2010 book The Art of Comedy, author Paul Ryan characterized Mango among "Some of the greatest characters from Saturday Night Live", including The Church Lady by Dana Carvey.

Writing in the chapter "Everybody Loves the Mango" in the 2013 book Saturday Night Live FAQ, author Stephen Tropiano called Mango a "bizarre character". Tropiano wrote of the actor's performance of the character, "Like Will Ferrell, Kattan is fearless and will go to extremes to get a laugh." Entertainment Weekly placed the hosting job of Garth Brooks on Saturday Night Live among the top ten best in history, due to "his surprising chemistry with Chris Kattan's Mango". Entertainment Weekly called Mango one of the "beloved characters" created by Kattan, in addition to Mr. Peepers and Doug Butabi.

The Houston Chronicle placed Mango's debut with actor Brendan Fraser at 26 among "The 50 greatest 'Saturday Night Live' skits of all time". The Maine Edge placed Mango among "beloved bits" from the show. Writing for Polygon in 2019, Joe Reid placed the Mango character among "queer canon" from Saturday Night Live. Reid commented, "The joke, of course, was that Mango was not gay, but just the ephemeral, unknowable Mango. Which, honestly, could play as a kind of post-gender thing today if the show ever wanted to ask Kattan back."

The Associated Press noted Kattan "was best known for the character Mango" out of all of his acting work on Saturday Night Live. Writing for StyleCaster, Laurel Pinson called Mango a "cult character" from Saturday Night Live. Entertainment Weekly observed Kattan gained much of his fame for portraying Mango and Mr. Peepers on Saturday Night Live. Entertainment Tonight called Mango one of Kattan's "most iconic characters". The Charlotte Observer called Mango one of the "most memorable characters" on Saturday Night Live. Tracy Bringhurst of the Idaho Press-Tribune wrote in 2020 of the lasting impression made by the character, "His recurring characters, from Mango to Mr. Peepers, have had lasting resonance with fans of the show." Paolo Alfar wrote in 2020 for Screen Rant that the Mango sketches were among the most underrated performances on Saturday Night Live. Alfar commented, "Mango is Chris Kattan's best recurring solo character."

== See also ==
- Androgyny in fashion
- List of androgynous people
- More Cowbell
- Pansexuality
- Recurring Saturday Night Live characters and sketches, and (introduced 1997–98)
