= The Naked Trucker and T-Bones Show =

Television series

- Genres: Country rock, comedy rock
- Members: Dave "Gruber" Allen; David Koechner

The Naked Trucker and T-Bones Show is a live musical comedy act. The pair has performed at the Largo nightclub, an alternative comedy hotspot in Los Angeles. The two "frontmen" of the band, The Naked Trucker and Gerald "T-Bones" Tibbons are played by actors Dave "Gruber" Allen and David Koechner, respectively. The show consists of catchy songs and long, humorous stories of life on the road.

The Naked Trucker sings and plays guitar, usually wearing nothing more than his red hat and boots. He is a coffee-fueled long-haul trucker who embraces his own nudity as the ultimate example of American freedom. T-Bones is a freeloading drifter who's rarely seen without his ball-peen hammer or bottle of sweet wine. Often underestimated, T-Bones surprises many, including Trucker, with his cunning and depth of knowledge.

The duo has performed live on Late Night with Conan O'Brien as well as Real Time with Bill Maher. They also have played various dates with Tenacious D.

Their signature song, "My American Dream," features a unique description of an ideal America. T-Bones also sings "My Daddy Is an Astronaut," a tragicomic tale of his fatherless childhood believing that Buzz Aldrin is his dad.

The Naked Trucker and T-Bones Show was picked up by the Comedy Central channel for eight episodes. The television show is a combination of live performances and pre-taped segments highlighting stories from their travels. It premiered at 10:30 PM EST on January 17, 2007. The show received mixed reviews, averaging 52% on Metacritic.

The two were featured on comedy bits in the CD release of The Alter Boys, providing comedy stints in between numerous songs on that CD.

== List of The Naked Trucker and T-Bones Show episodes ==
=== Season 1 ===
1. "Demo Tape": T-Bones becomes Trucker's music manager and gets him involved with a dishonest boat salesman. Will Ferrell guest stars as a hitchhiker who is suspicious of machinery.
2. "Key to the City": T-Bones claims that he was once awarded the key to the "City" of Vermont. Meanwhile, the guys encounter a hitchhiker dressed in a bear suit. (Guest star: Andy Richter)
3. "Vision Quest": T-Bones' spirit guide takes him on a vision quest, ranging from the bathroom in a service station (with guest star Dax Shepard as a "shaman") to the midway of a carnival. In the process, the secrets of some of the carnival games are revealed.
4. "Gold Watch": While Trucker gets his license suspended, T-Bones is the speaker at a retirement home. Guest star Paul Rudd featured in weekly "I Dream of an America..." segment.
5. "Salute to America": Trucker attempts a salute to America as T-Bones disrupts a small town parade.
6. "The Break-Up": Trucker's feelings are hurt by T-Bones's children's show. (Guest stars: Jack Black and Kyle Gass)
7. "T-Bones TV": The guys pick up their 500th hitchhiker. (Guest stars: Steve Carell, Nancy Walls, Neil Flynn, Opus Moreschi)
8. "Trouble I Think": Trucker is called as a witness in a hobo trial.

== Live album and DVD ==
The Naked Trucker and T-Bones' first live album, Live at the Troubadour, was released on Warner Bros. Records in conjunction with a DVD of the same concert on March 20, 2007.
