= Angie Tribeca =

American comedy television series

- Also known as: Angie Tribeca: Special Division Force
- Genre: Sitcom; Parody; Crime; Mystery
- Created by: Steve Carell; Nancy Carell
- Starring: Rashida Jones; Hayes MacArthur; Jere Burns; Deon Cole; Andrée Vermeulen; Kiersey Clemons; Bobby Cannavale
- Theme music composer: Jim Latham
- Composers: Nathan Matthew David; Ludwig Göransson
- Country of origin: United States
- Original language: English
- No. of seasons: 4
- No. of episodes: 40 (list of episodes)

Production
- Executive producers: Steve Carell; Nancy Carell; Ira Ungerleider; Thom Hinkle; Campbell Smith
- Producers: Ronald D. Chong; Rashida Jones
- Cinematography: Matt Sohn
- Camera setup: Single-camera
- Running time: 21 minutes
- Production companies: Carousel Television; 301 Productions; TBS Productions (seasons 1–2); Studio T (seasons 3–4)

Original release
- Network: TBS
- Release: January 17, 2016 – December 30, 2018

Angie Tribeca is an American television sitcom created by Steve and Nancy Carell, which aired on TBS. A parody of the police procedural genre, it stars Rashida Jones as the titular character, with Hayes MacArthur, Jere Burns, Deon Cole and Andrée Vermeulen in supporting roles.

The first season of Angie Tribeca premiered on January 17–18, 2016, the second season premiered on June 6 of that year, and the third season premiered on April 10, 2017. The fourth and final season, Angie Tribeca: Special Division Force, was released in its entirety across December 29 and December 30, 2018.

On May 9, 2019, the series was cancelled after four seasons.

== Plot ==
Detective Angie Tribeca, a 10-year veteran of the Los Angeles Police Department's elite RHCU (Really Heinous Crimes Unit), is assigned a new partner, fellow detective Jason "Jay" Geils. The format of each episode involves a different criminal case for the LAPD to solve. The show features nonstop one-liners, jokes, visual humor, and irony.

== Development and production ==
The series was announced by TBS in mid-2014 with a ten-episode order. It was promoted as "a hilarious spoof of police procedurals in the spirit of Police Squad!". A few gags presented in the preview reel were cited as similar to the TV cop show satire Sledge Hammer!.

Originally intended to premiere in late 2015, in November 2015 it was announced that the first season of ten episodes would run uninterrupted on the network and be released through video on demand starting on January 17, 2016. All 10 episodes of season 1 premiered during a 25-hour TV marathon on January 17–18, 2016.

A second season of an additional ten episodes premiered on June 6, 2016. On July 6, 2016, TBS renewed the series for a third season, which premiered on April 10, 2017. The fourth season, which premiered on December 29, 2018, added Bobby Cannavale to the cast.

The music for the series was written by Nathan Matthew David and Ludwig Göransson.

== Cast ==
=== Main cast ===
- Rashida Jones as Det. Angela 99 "Angie" Tribeca
- Hayes MacArthur as Det./Lt. Jason "Jay" Geils (seasons 1–3)
- Jere Burns as Lt./Capt. Pritikin "Chet" Atkins, Angie's boss
  - Burns also plays Eric Atkins, Lt. Atkins' identical twin brother; Capt. Gumbo Atkins, Atkins' Cajun cousin in New Orleans; Lt. Paddy Atkins, Atkins' Irish cousin in New York
- Deon Cole as Det. Daniel J. "DJ" Tanner (seasons 1–3; guest star: season 4)
- Andrée Vermeulen as Dr. Monica Scholls, the medical examiner
- Kiersey Clemons as Maria Charo, the psychiatrist (season 4)
- Bobby Cannavale as Angela "AJ" Geils, Jr., Angie and Jay's son (season 4)

=== Recurring cast ===
- Jagger as Det. David Hoffman, Tanner's canine partner, who possesses human-like physical abilities
- Alfred Molina as Dr. Edelweiss, the expert scientist (Uncredited) (Seasons 1-3)
- Andreas Wigand as Screaming Cop Dave (Season 1)
- Dillon Paigen as Vomiting Cop (Seasons 1 and 3)
- Caitlin Kimball as Rookie Cop (Season 2)
- James Franco as Sgt. Edward "Eddie" Pepper (Seasons 1 and 2)
- Matthew Glave as Mayor (Seasons 1-3) / Vice President (Season 4) Joseph "Joe" Perry
- Heather Graham as FBI Special Agent Diane Duran (Seasons 2-4)
- Nancy Carell as Katie Perry, Mayor Perry's wife (Seasons 1 and 2)
- Chris Pine as Dr. Thomas Hornbein, alias The Zookeeper, a psychopathic extremist in the animal-rights movement and former world-renowned doctor of zoology (Season 3)
- Annie Mumolo as Beth Wiedner (Season 3)
- Rob Riggle as Det. Zachary Fontaine / Calvin Sniglet (Season 3)
- Mary McCormack as Internal Affairs Agent Abigail Liukin (Seasons 2 and 3)
- Alison Rich as Det. Small (Season 2)
- John Michael Higgins as Dr. Zaius / Randall "Randy" Zaius, Dr. Zaius' identical twin brother (Seasons 1, 3, and 4)
- Michaela Watkins as Melanie Burke (Seasons 2 and 3)
- Peggy Lipton as Peggy Tribeca, Angie's mother (Seasons 2 and 3)
- Chris Kimball as Officer Kyle (Season 3)
- Ren Hanami as Fluga (Season 3)
- Taran Killam as Pierre Cardin, French Ambassador to the United Nations (Season 4)

=== Guest stars ===
- Gary Cole as Professor Everett Lamereau ("Pilot")
- Lisa Kudrow as Monica Vivarquar, the mayor's mistress ("Pilot")
- Adam Scott as Surgeon ("The Wedding Planner Did It")
- Gillian Vigman as Jean Naté, a famous celebrity wedding planner who is also the villainous mastermind of a drug selling operation ("The Wedding Planner Did It")
- Sarah Chalke as Mrs. Parsons, widow of murdered ventriloquist Alan Parsons ("The Famous Ventriloquist Did It")
- Jeff Dunham as Fisher Price, a ventriloquist ("The Famous Ventriloquist Did It").
- Amy Smart as Stacy ("Commissioner Bigfish")
- David Koechner as Police Commissioner Niles J. Bigfish ("Commissioner Bigfish")
- Kerri Kenney-Silver as Special Agent Laurie Partridge, Fish and Game Division, Rodent Task Force ("Ferret Royale")
- Keegan-Michael Key as Helmut Fröntbüt, who runs an animal charity ("Ferret Royale")
- Bill Murray as Victor "Vic" Deakins, an employee at the supermarket where Tribeca shops ("Tribeca's Day Off")
- Cecily Strong as Samantha Stevens, a fancy lady addicted to plastic surgery who works at a country club ("Tribeca's Day Off")
- Laura Bell Bundy as Vivian Tribeca, Angie's second cousin once removed ("Murder in the First Class")
- Gene Simmons as Himself ("Inside Man")
- Danny Trejo as Himself ("Inside Man")
- John Gemberling as Hipster Barista ("The One With the Bomb")
- Ryan Hansen as Wilson Phillips, a bartender and aspiring gym teacher ("The One With the Bomb")
- Jon Hamm as McCormick, Geils' partner who was "the best man on the force" but was transferred just as Tribeca awoke from her coma ("Fleas Don't Kill Me")
- Vicki Lewis as Anne Muffet, the dog trainer and murder suspect ("Fleas Don't Kill Me")
- Busy Philipps as Courtney Woodpatch-Newton, anti-whaling activist and murder suspect ("Miso Dead")
- Rhys Darby as Dr. Helm, a forensic scientist and dentist ("Miso Dead")
- Tzi Ma as Joseph Takagi, apprentice and killer of sushi chef Kobayashi Maru, owner of the high-end sushi restaurant Smells Like Fish ("Miso Dead")
- David Walton as Brad Wilson, head lifeguard ("Beach Blanket Sting-O")
- Kevin Pollak as LTJG (ret.) Sam Weinberg, United States Navy Judge Advocate General's Corps ("Beach Blanket Sting-O")
- Josh Meyers as Professors Ned and Ted Doppelganger ("You've Got Blackmail")
- Danny Pudi as Garth Tweedner ("You've Got Blackmail")
- Matt Malloy as Robert "Bob" Terrier, Mayor Perry's campaign manager ("A Coldie but a Goodie")
- Maya Rudolph as Ms. Jacqueline "Jackie" Wilder, a romance novelist ("Organ Trail")
- Eriq La Salle as Dr. Brainerd ("Organ Trail")
- Noah Wyle as Mr. Alcindor, a hospital administrator ("Organ Trail")
- Todd Louiso as Mr. Fibonacci, a hair transplant patient ("Organ Trail")
- Melanie Hutsell as Nurse Barton ("Organ Trail")
- Saul Rubinek as Jack Pfoopa, manager of boyband Boypocalypse Wow ("Boyz II Dead")
- Joey McIntyre as Skylar, the "pretty" member of boyband Boypocalypse Wow ("Boyz II Dead")
- Chris Kirkpatrick as Chad, the "funny" member of boyband Boypocalypse Wow ("Boyz II Dead")
- Aaron Carter as P.T. Cruiser, the "bad boy" member of boyband Boypocalypse Wow, who was murdered ("Boyz II Dead")
- Colton Dunn as Denarius, the "ethnic" member of boyband Boypocalypse Wow ("Boyz II Dead")
- Joe Jonas as LAPD Detective Green, who brings the other detectives coffee and is alluded to be the one that should infiltrate boyband Boypocalypse Wow ("Boyz II Dead")
- Jonathan Frakes as Admiral Donald "Don" Van Zandt, USCG, Commandant of the Coast Guard ("The Coast is Fear")
- John Magaro as Chief Petty Officer Carlton Snick, USCG, Admiral Van Zandt's assistant ("The Coast is Fear")
- Daniel Stern as Councilman Richard "Dick" Dreyfuss ("The Coast is Fear")
- Blake Lee as Sebastian Elsworth ("Contains Graphic Designer Violence")
- Josh McDermitt as Alistair Cook, owner of a local microbrewery ("Contains Graphic Designer Violence")
- Wayne Wilderson as Phillip Sousa, a trombone player and neighbor of Sebastian Elsworth ("Contains Graphic Designer Violence")
- Ed Begley Jr. as Bonnie ("Electoral Dysfunction")
- Timothy Omundson as Dr. Duncan Farnsworth III, a trophy hunter ("Welcome Back, Blotter")
- Jessica St. Clair as Mrs. Claire Farnsworth, Dr. Farnsworth's wife ("Welcome Back, Blotter")
- Graham Rogers as Eric ("Murder Gras")
- Randall Park as Dr. Moreau, therapist at Tribeca's precinct ("Brockman Turner Overdrive")
- Andrew Bachelor as Aaron McLaren, a star athlete at USWC ("Brockman Turner Overdrive")
- Nate Torrence as Kurt Piedmont, the victim of a hit-and-run ("Brockman Turner Overdrive")
- Michelle Dockery as Victoria Nova, assistant to Dr. Jurgen Kottbulle ("Turn Me On, Geils")
- Natalie Portman as Christina Craft ("This Sounds Unbelievable, but CSI: Miami Did It")
- Rob Huebel as Sperber Pennington, CEO of Galaxium Aerospace ("This Sounds Unbelievable, but CSI: Miami Did It")
- Rachel Dratch as Masha Chekhov ("Hey, I'm Solvin' Here!")
- Robert Pine as Lawrence "Larry" Sniglet, Calvin Sniglet's father ("Hey, I'm Solvin' Here!")
- Constance Zimmer as NYPD Detective Jessica "Jessie" Goldstein ("Hey, I'm Solvin' Here!")
- Stephen Root as Mortimer Begoyle, oil tycoon and CEO of Westernish Energy ("License to Drill")
- Kelly Rohrbach as Stephanie Begoyle (alias Laura Ashley), Mortimer's daughter and the heiress to his fortune ("License to Drill")
- Jean Smart as Carnie ("License to Drill")
- Jack McBrayer as Wade McDink, a prisoner who boiled his entire family ("License to Drill")
- Ana Ortiz as Betty Crocker ("If You See Something, Solve Something")
- Lizzy Caplan as Deirdre ("If You See Something, Solve Something")
- Ernie Hudson as Peter "Pete" Tribeca, Angie's father ("Germs on Endearment")
- Ed Helms as Dr. Clive Mister, CDC ("Germs of Endearment")
- Niecy Nash as Pandora ("Go Get 'Em, Tiger")
- Billy Gardell as Officer Depot ("Go Get 'Em, Tiger")
- Eliza Coupe as Dr. Autumn Portugal, Head of Surgery at the Mustard Clinic ("The Force Wakes Up")
- Isla Fisher as Lana Bobanna ("Glitch Perfect")
- Dove Cameron as Grace ("Glitch Perfect")
- Jimmy Tatro as Paul Boneson, a 22-year-old professional gamer under the alias "BoneDevil666" who plays a game called "Voyage Quest" for a professional gaming team known as SharkSpark ("Joystick Luck Club")
- Gillian Jacobs as Becky Bunker, Boneson's ex-girlfriend who plays under the alias "Baguette Bardot" ("Joystick Luck Club")
- Anjelica Huston as Anna Summour, head of the noted fashion magazine Popular ("Just the Fat Ma’am")
- Jim Rash as Philip Grammbbowski, a high-rolling investor ("Trader Foes")
- Rose Byrne as Norrah Newt, CEO of Kappa Kappa Capital ("Trader Foes")
- Tony Cavalero as Timothy "Timmy" Rhebus ("Freezing Cold Prestige Drama")
- Gina Torres as United States Secretary of the Interior Gillian Kayhill ("Behind the Scandalabra")
- Carl Reiner as Glenn-Allen Mixon, former director of the FBI ("Behind the Scandalabra")
- Kathryn Hahn as Susan ("Air Force Two")
- Carol Burnett as President Priscilla Filcox ("Air Force Two")

== Episodes ==
Season	Episodes	Originally released	
Season	Episodes	First released	Last released
1	10	January 17, 2016	January 18, 2016
2	10	June 6, 2016	August 8, 2016
3	10	April 10, 2017	June 12, 2017
4	10	December 29, 2018	December 30, 2018

== Reception ==
Angie Tribeca was met with positive reviews from critics. On Rotten Tomatoes, the first season has an approval rating of 89% based on 38 reviews, with an average rating of 7.71/10. The site's critical consensus reads, "Angie Tribeca's unique blend of sharp wit and broad humor – and the obvious fun being had by a talented cast – make for a consistent, charmingly absurd spoof of police procedurals." Metacritic gives it a weighted average score of 78 out of 100 based on 15 critics, indicating "generally favorable reviews".

On Rotten Tomatoes, Seasons 2 and 3 each hold an approval rating of 100% based on five reviews.

== See also ==
- Police Squad!, a 1982 comedy television show with the same style of humor
- Sledge Hammer! (1986), a sustained satire of Dirty Harry and other action heroes
- A Touch of Cloth, a similar British comedy (2012–2014)
