= Gerald "T-Bones" Tibbons =

Fictional character

Gerald "T-Bones" Tibbons is a comedic fictional character played by David Koechner. He has appeared on two television series and alongside his partner, The Naked Trucker, performed live, and recorded a musical album. As of March 2007, a film based on T-Bones was also in the works.

When asked what the inspiration behind the character was, Koechner explained, "He's a truth teller, we crafted these characters with a lot of truth, and Gerald purely lives for every moment." Koechner also stated that he based Gerald "T-Bones" Tibbons off a Midwestern muse drifter named "Four Way George." The character dates back to 1995, when Koechner filmed a short television pilot based on T-Bones' misadventures. The character became so popular that Koechner would go to auditions, only to find that directors were always demanding his stage persona.

== Saturday Night Live ==
T-Bones made his first major TV appearance as an executioner, hospital orderly and barber during the 1995–1996 season of Saturday Night Live, when Koechner was a cast member on the long-running comedy program. He made numerous appearances there and served as the focal point of the sketches, making sly jokes and showcasing his redneck mentality as he annoyed others around him. T-Bones became recognizable by his signature appearance of a slicked comb over, long mutton chop sideburns, tight brown T-shirt, and underbite. In the midst of making clever comments, T-Bones often reveals his utter foolishness and speaks with a hint of southern accent.

== The Naked Trucker and T-Bones Show ==
It was during Koechner's brief tenure on Saturday Night Live that he met Dave "Gruber" Allen who, too, had developed a sketch comedy character known as Naked Trucker. The duo formed a musical comedy act in 1999 with T-Bones serving as the vocalist and Trucker on guitar and vocals. They have performed frequently at the Largo nightclub and alongside Tenacious D as well as garnering some TV appearances. The stage act, a mix of stand-up comedy and off-color country songs, became a hit on the Hollywood improv circuit, ultimately landing television performances on Late Night with Conan O'Brien, The Late Late Show with Craig Ferguson, Jimmy Kimmel Live!, and Real Time with Bill Maher. Their popularity also lead to several offers to bring their act to television, though many early deals never came to fruition. The musical act also helped shed light on T-Bones' background with songs like "My Daddy Is An Astronaut," which describes his fatherless childhood and believing that Buzz Aldrin is his dad, not Neil Armstrong as often reported.

On January 17, 2007, over a decade after T-Bones's Saturday Night Live debut, Comedy Central premiered The Naked Trucker and T-Bones Show. While a number of movies have been based on SNL characters, this was an extremely rare case of one getting its own TV series. In contrast to his barbershop position on SNL, T-Bones was now portrayed as a freeloading drifter and con artist alongside his counterpart, Naked Trucker, who usually served as the more sensible straight man. He also claimed to have had experience as a carny and was frequently seen in promotional photos with an American flag draped over his shoulder as a sign of his patriotism. Between performing in front of a live studio audience, the team presented pre-taped sketches showing them getting in trouble with the law or incidents with hitchhikers they picked up off the highway. The series lasted only eight episodes to mixed reviews.

== Film in development ==
Following the release of Naked Trucker and T-Bones: Live at the Troubador in March 2007, Koechner revealed that he has a T-Bones film in development. Will Ferrell and Adam McKay's Gary Sanchez Productions will produce the film through Paramount Vantage. Koechner is currently working on the film with screenwriter/producer Norm Hiscock, who was a writer for The Naked Trucker and T-Bones Show, in addition to past work on Saturday Night Live, The Kids in the Hall, and King of the Hill.

== See also ==
- Recurring Saturday Night Live characters and sketches
