= Chris Kattan =

American actor and comedian (born 1970)

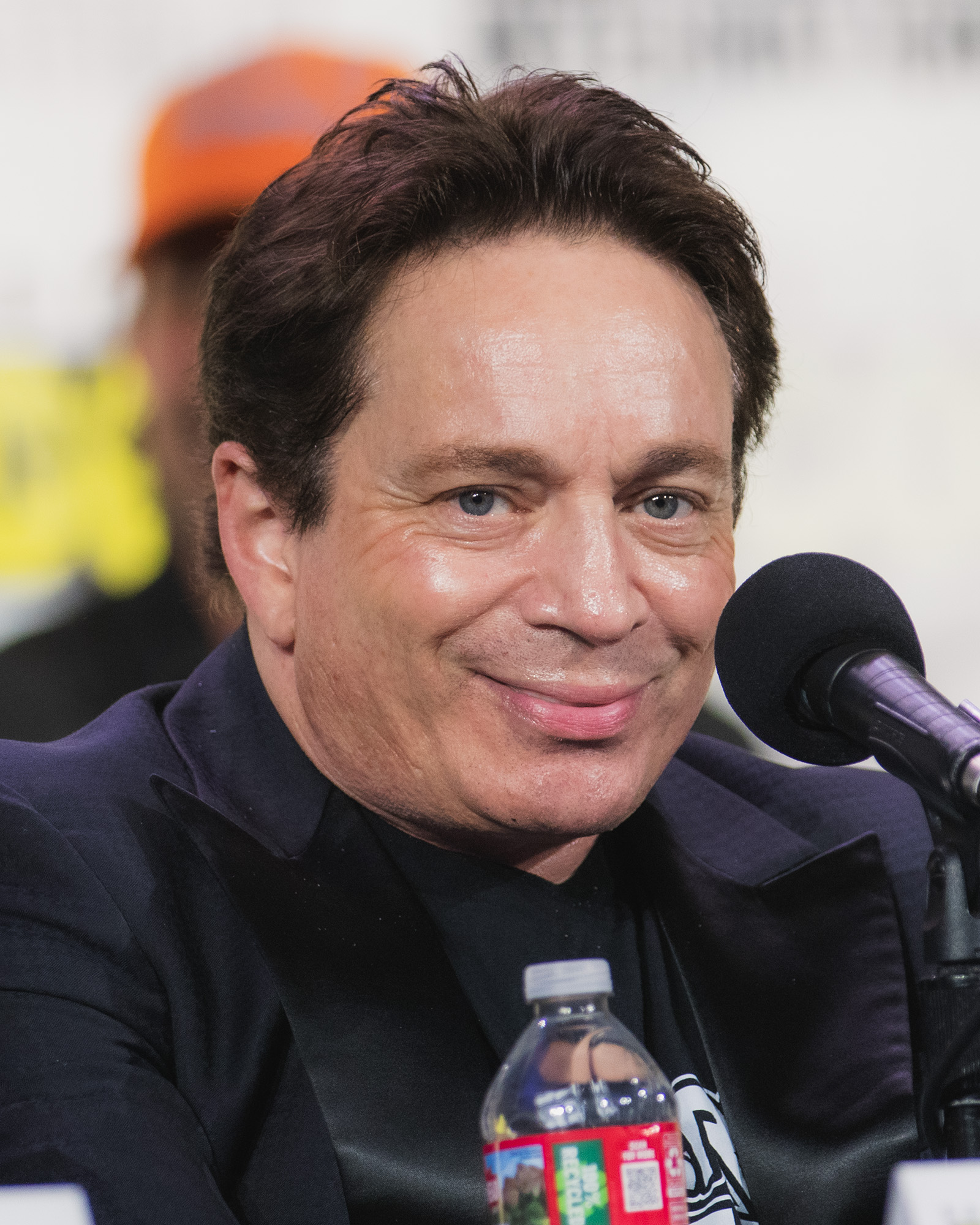
- Kattan at the 2026 San Diego Comic Con
- Born: Christopher Lee Kattan; October 19, 1970 (age 56); Culver City, California, U.S.
- Occupations: Actor; comedian
- Years active: 1993–present
- Television: Bollywood Hero; Saturday Night Live
- Spouse: Sunshine Deia Tutt (m. 2008; div. 2009)
- Father: Kip King
- Relatives: Andrew Joslyn (half-brother)

Christopher Lee Kattan (/kəˈtæn/ kə-TAN; born October 19, 1970) is an American actor and comedian. After performing with numerous comedy troupes, including The Groundlings in Los Angeles, he broke through as a regular cast member on the sketch comedy show Saturday Night Live (1996–2003).

Following his breakout, Kattan had starring roles in the films A Night at the Roxbury (1998), House on Haunted Hill (1999), Monkeybone (2001), Corky Romano (2001), and Undercover Brother (2002). He experienced a career resurgence with a main role as Bob Weaver on the first five seasons of the ABC sitcom The Middle (2009–2014). In the 2010s, Kattan voiced the title character on the Cartoon Network and Boomerang animated series Bunnicula (2016–2018) and had a supporting voice role in the animated comedy film Hotel Transylvania 2 (2015).

== Early life ==
Kattan was born in Culver City, California. His father, Kip King (né Jerome Kattan; 1937–2010), was born to Jewish parents from Iraq and Poland and worked as an actor and voice artist. His mother, Hajnalka Biro (b. 1944), was once photographed for Playboy and worked as a model in London. She is a native of Budapest, Hungary, and is a Buddhist. His stepfather was a Buddhist therapist and monk. His half-brother, Andrew Joslyn, is a professional musician and composer.

Kattan was raised on a Zen retreat on Mount San Antonio, outside Los Angeles. He and his mother moved to Bainbridge Island, Washington, where he attended Bainbridge High School, graduating in 1989.

== Career ==
=== Early career ===
Kattan was a member of several improvisational comedy (improv) and sketch comedy troupes, one of them being The Groundlings in Los Angeles. His father was an original member of the troupe. Kattan also did some minor roles on TV, including the second episode of the second season of NewsRadio, "No, This Is Not Based Entirely on Julie's Life", as a photo shop employee.

=== 1996–2003: Saturday Night Live ===
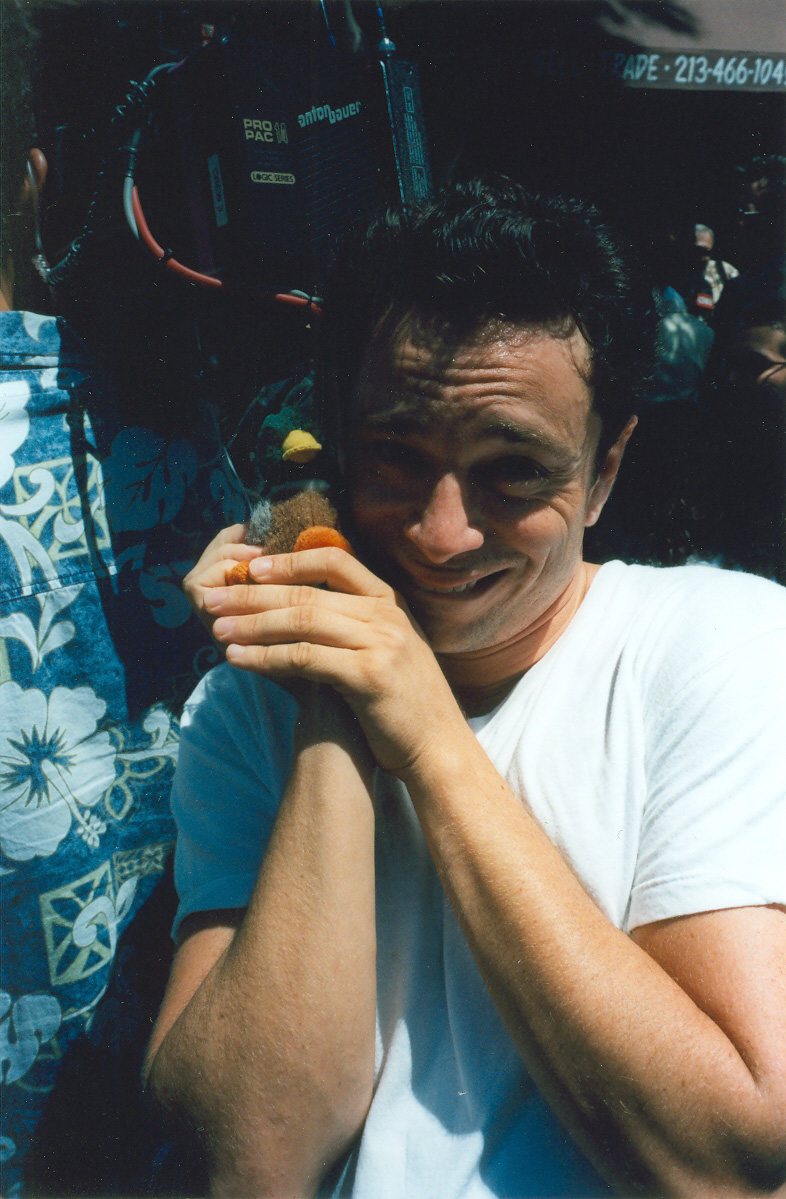
Kattan on August 19, 1999 (after Lorne Michaels received his star on the Walk of Fame)

Kattan moved to New York City to work on Saturday Night Live from 1996 to 2003. His recurring characters included Mr. Peepers, Mango, Azrael Abyss, Kyle DeMarco from The DeMarco Brothers, Gay Hitler, and, most notably, one half of the Butabi Brothers with fellow SNL (and Groundlings) cast member Will Ferrell, known for their trademark head-bobbing. Kattan and Ferrell continued the characters in the 1998 film A Night at the Roxbury.

==== SNL celebrity impersonations ====
Kattan's celebrity impersonations included Clay Aiken, Christiane Amanpour, Antonio Banderas, Andy Dick, Larry Fine, Bill Gates, Ben Affleck, David Gest, Elián González, Anne Heche, Julio Iglesias Jr., Steve Irwin, Chris Kirkpatrick, Ricky Martin, Al Pacino, Kid Rock, David Lee Roth, Paul Shaffer, David Spade, Kerri Strug (also appeared in Weekend Update with Strug as her fictional brother, Kippy), Geraldo Rivera, Robert Downey Jr., Queen Elizabeth II, and Anthony Fauci.

During his time on SNL, Kattan starred in the films A Night at the Roxbury, House on Haunted Hill (1999), Monkeybone (2001), Corky Romano (2001), and Undercover Brother (2002).

=== 2004–present: Post-SNL work ===
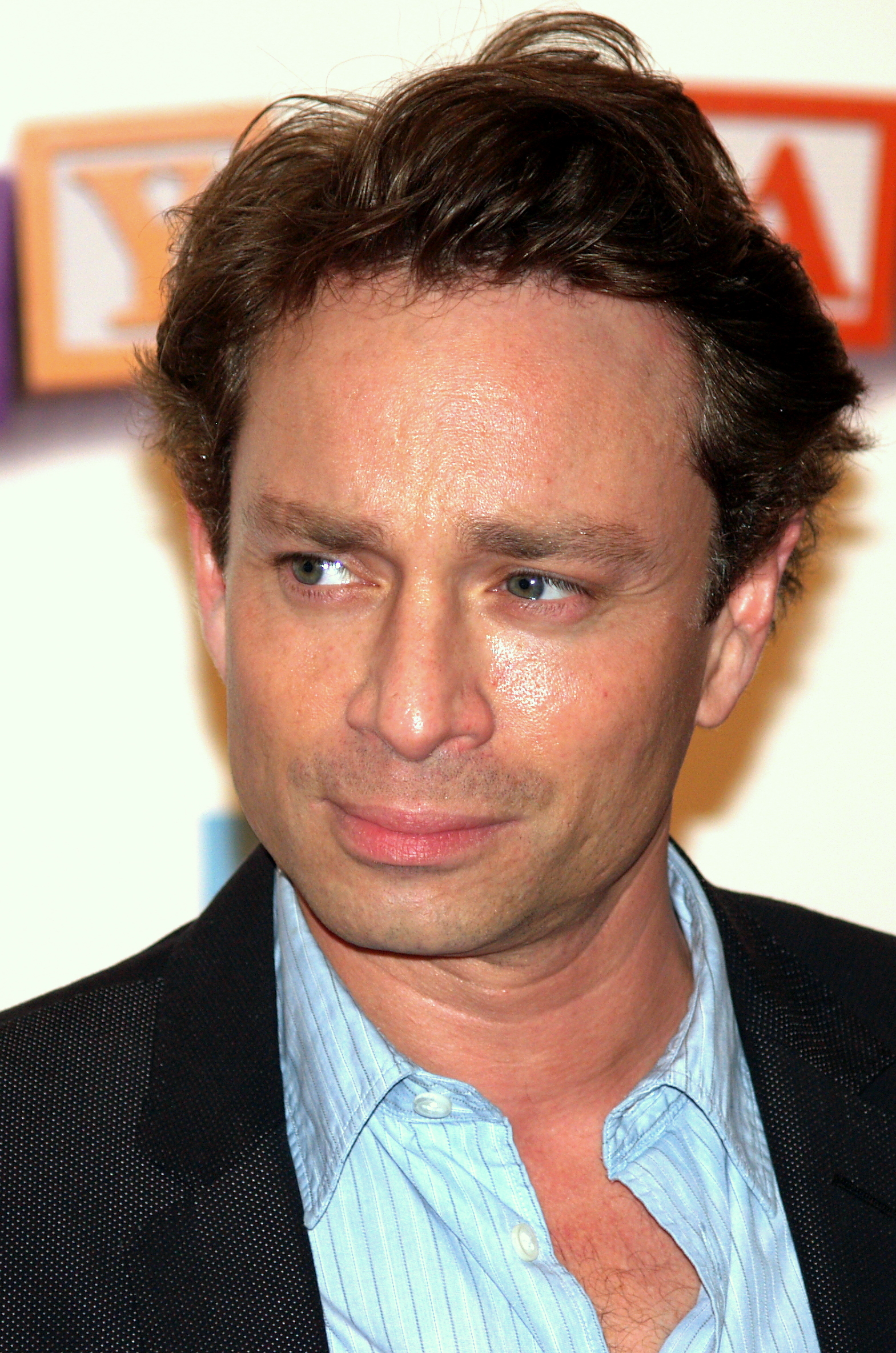
Kattan at the premiere of Baby Mama in New York City at the 2008 Tribeca Film Festival

In 2004 Kattan appeared on Broadway as Xanthias in Stephen Sondheim's The Frogs. He was later replaced in the role by Roger Bart.

Kattan appeared in a Diet Pepsi Max commercial during Super Bowl XLII in 2008 that featured the song "What Is Love" and had many actors in the commercial performing the head bob from A Night at the Roxbury.

In August 2009, Kattan starred in the Independent Film Channel (IFC) miniseries Bollywood Hero, where he portrays himself and the difficulties he faces after a career as a comic actor, trying to attain leading man status. From 2009 to 2014, Kattan appeared in a supporting role in the sitcom The Middle as Bob, a colleague of Frankie Heck's at Mr. Ehlert's car dealership. Kattan appeared in an episode of How I Met Your Mother as a star in "The Wedding Bride", a fictional movie within the show. He played himself portraying Jed Mosely, the film's villain, which the screenwriter bases on his girlfriend's ex-fiancé, series protagonist, Ted Mosby. He reappeared as the character in the fictional film's sequel, Wedding Bride 2. On December 17, 2011, Kattan made a guest appearance on the Saturday Night Live Christmas show, hosted by Jimmy Fallon, and again briefly on the final episode of SNL's 37th season.

In June 2014, Kattan reprised his role as former SNL character Mango in a preview of the music video for Sharaya J's "Shut It Down", featured in a fashion campaign by Alexander Wang. In 2015, he voiced Kakie, a cake monster, in the film Hotel Transylvania 2. From 2016 to 2018, Kattan voiced the title character in the animated series Bunnicula. In 2017, Kattan was a contestant on season 24 of Dancing with the Stars paired with professional dancer Witney Carson. He was the first celebrity dancer eliminated.

Kattan reunited with fellow SNL alumni Jimmy Fallon, Horatio Sanz, and Tracy Morgan during the December 18, 2018, cold open of The Tonight Show Starring Jimmy Fallon, which also featured Ariana Grande, in a reprisal of their performance of "I Wish it Was Christmas Today". It was the first time since 2011 that Fallon, Sanz, Kattan, and Morgan were all present for a performance of the song.

In 2022, Kattan was announced as a HouseGuest competing on the third season of Celebrity Big Brother.

In 2023, Kattan did voice work in the film Leo as Alligator #1.

In November 2026, Kattan had launched his production and distribution company Kattan Films, an independent company focusing on acquiring films for theatrical release while developing its own slate of original productions.

== Personal life ==
Kattan married model Sunshine Deia Tutt on June 28, 2008, in Oakhurst, California, after proposing to her on Christmas Eve 2006. The couple separated 44 days later on August 10, 2008, and divorced in February 2009.

On March 25, 2023, Kattan proposed to his girlfriend, Maria Libri, a writer and former on-air personality, in front of the stage at a Wilco concert held at the Riviera Theatre, while the Chicago band played "I'm the Man Who Loves You." The band members knew about the proposal. Kattan and Libri had met 18 months before the proposal when Kattan was performing a stand-up comedy show at Boondocks Pub in Springfield. They have since collaborated on writing projects, including a romantic comedy, and have also appeared together on the YouTube channel, Hey Kattan!

=== Neck injury ===
Kattan broke his neck while filming an SNL sketch on May 12, 2001 parodying The Golden Girls, during which he threw himself backwards on a chair. He kept this injury a secret from Lorne Michaels and the public for years, although apparently NBC paid for two of the five surgeries he underwent afterwards. He has had impaired mobility ever since.The pain medication he began taking following his fourth surgery led to a 2014 DUI arrest.

He kept this injury a secret until the release of his 2019 memoir. Kattan competed in Dancing with the Stars in 2017, where judges criticized him for his stiff upper body movement, not knowing about this injury.

== Memoir ==
In 2019, Kattan published a memoir, titled Baby Don't Hurt Me: Stories and Scars from Saturday Night Live, which included the accident on SNL.

== Filmography ==
=== Film ===
Year	Film	Role	Notes
1993	The Making of '...And God Spoke'	Moviegoer #1	
1998	A Night at the Roxbury	Doug Butabi	
1999	House on Haunted Hill	Watson Pritchett	
2000	Any Given Wednesday	Al Pacino	Short film
2001	Monkeybone	Organ Donor Stu	
2001	Corky Romano	Corky Romano	
2002	Undercover Brother	Mr. Feather	
2005	Adam & Steve	Michael	
2005	Santa's Slay	Jason Mason	
2007	Undead or Alive: A Zombedy	Luke Rudd	
2007	Aqua Teen Hunger Force Colon Movie Film for Theaters	Walter Melon (voice)	
2007	Nancy Drew	Burglar	
2007	Christmas in Wonderland	Leonard Cardoza	
2008	Delgo	Filo (voice)	
2009	Scouts Honor: Badge to the Bone	Brandon	
2009	Tanner Hall	George Middlewood	
2010	Hollywood & Wine	Jack Sanders	
2010	Devolved	Coach Papillion	
2011	Hard Breakers	Hertz Waters	
2011	A Holiday Heist	Uncle Harry	
2012	Foodfight!	Polar Penguin (voice)	
2012	Crazy Enough	Fred/Teddy	
2012	Guns, Girls and Gambling	Gay Elvis	
2013	Slightly Single in L.A.	Drew	
2015	Troop Hood	Phil Neffler	Short film
2015	Hotel Transylvania 2	Kakie (voice)	
2015	The Ridiculous 6	John Wilkes Booth	
2015	The Passenger	Sebastian	Short film
2015	ImagiGARY	Officer Jones	
2016	The Last Film Festival	Harvey Weinstein	
2017	Desiderata	Man	Short film
2017	Walk of Fame	Alejandro	
2017	Breaking Legs	Robby	
2017	How to Get Girls	Mr. Fox	
2018	Mr. Malevolent	Mr. Preevy	
2018	The Bobby Roberts Project	Self	Mockumentary
2019	The Soviet Sleep Experiment	Subject 3	
2020	Guest House	Delivery Guy Ricky	
2020	In Other Words	Maximillion Woods	
2021	40-Love	Bootman	
2021	Famous	Lawrence Nichols	
2023	Leo	Alligator #1 (voice)	
TBA	Concert Heroes †		

Key
†	Denotes films that have not yet been released

=== Television ===
Year	Film	Role	Notes
1995	NewsRadio	Employee #3	Episode: "No, This Is Not Based Entirely on Julie's Life"
1996	Grace Under Fire	Carnival Barker	Episode: "Guess Who's Not Coming to Lunch?"
1996–2003, 2006, 2011	Saturday Night Live	Various roles	Series regular: 1996–2003; guest: 2006 & 2011; 148 episodes
2005	Enough About Me	Chris Adams	TV film
2006	Totally Awesome	Gabriel	TV film
2006	The Year Without a Santa Claus	Sparky	TV film
2007	Two Dreadful Children	Chet Dunbar (voice)	TV film
2008	Gym Teacher: The Movie	Sploopers Show Host/ESPN Announcer	TV film
2009	AllaKattan!	Self	
2009–2014	The Middle	Bob Weaver	Series regular, 56 episodes
2010–2014	How I Met Your Mother	Jed Mosley	2 episodes
2011	Late Night with Jimmy Fallon	Casey Madisenn/Bill Fisk	Episode: "28 July 2011"
2014	The (206)	Various roles	Episode: "Season 2, Episode 12"
2014	The Tonight Show Starring Jimmy Fallon	Craig Newton	Episode: "Kevin Spacey/Lewis Black"
2014–2015	Jake and the Never Land Pirates	King Zongo (voice)	3 episodes
2015	The Awesomes	Indiana Johnson (voice)	Episode: "Indiana Johnson and the Nazi Granddaughters"
2016	Jingle Ballin'	DJ Booth	
2016–2018	Bunnicula	Bunnicula, Arthur Monroe (voice)	Main cast (104 episodes)
2017	Real Rob	Mitch	Episode: "Acupuncture & Spring Rolls"
2017	Sharknado 5: Global Swarming	Prime Minister	TV film
2017–2018	Voltron: Legendary Defender	Blaytz (voice)	3 episodes
2018	The Time Capsule	Rod	TV film
2018	Lent!	Conrad	TV film
2021	Beebo Saves Christmas	Sprinkles, Elfin-Mark-V (voice)	Television special
2022	Celebrity Big Brother 3	Himself	
2022	The Cuphead Show!	Werner Werman (voice)	Episode: "Rat's All, Folks"

== Awards and nominations ==
Year	Award	Category	Nominated work	Result
2000	Teen Choice Awards	Choice TV Personality	Saturday Night Live	Nominated
2001	Teen Choice Awards	Choice Comedian	—N/a	Nominated
2013	Bonehead Award	Best Actor	Just Crazy Enough	Won
2016	Hoboken International Film Festival Award	Best Supporting Actor	Breaking Legs	Nominated

== Book ==
- Kattan, Chris (with Travis Thrasher) (2019). Baby, Don't Hurt Me: Stories and Scars from Saturday Night Live. Dallas, TX: BenBella Books. ISBN 978-1944648497
