= David Koechner =

American actor and comedian (born 1962)

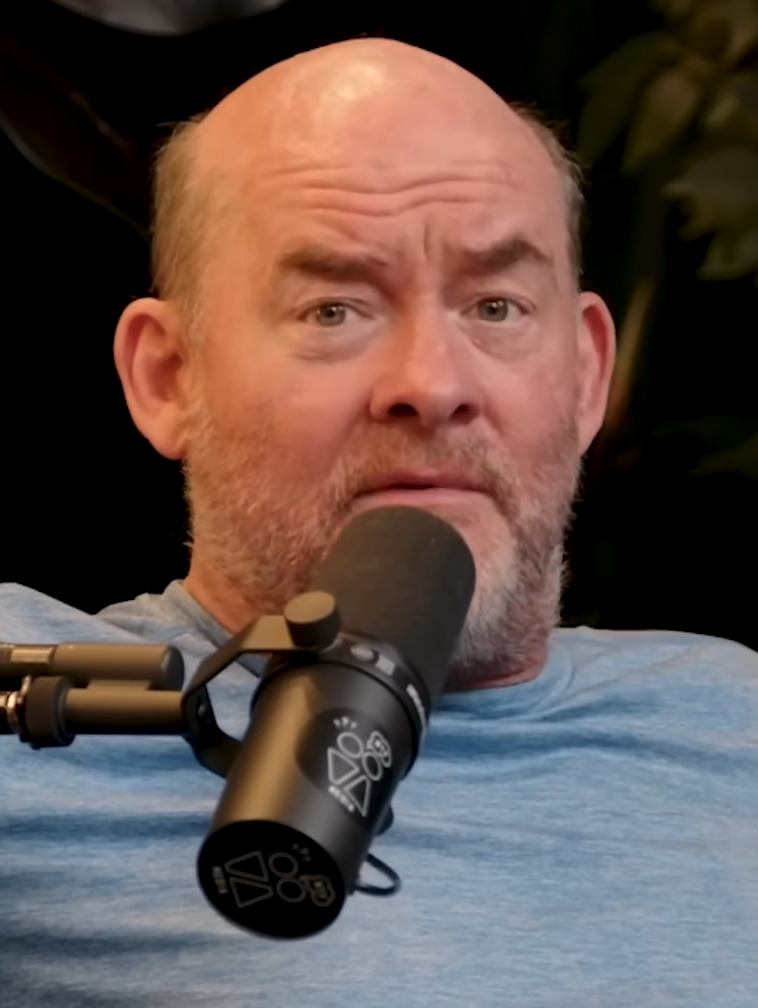
- Koechner in 2024
- Born: David Michael Koechner; August 24, 1962 (age 64); Tipton, Missouri, U.S.
- Other name: Dave Koechner
- Occupations: Actor; comedian
- Years active: 1986–present
- Spouse: Leigh Koechner (m. 1998; sep. 2020)
- Children: 5
- Website: www.david-koechner.com

David Michael Koechner (/ˈkɛknər/ KEK-nər; born August 24, 1962) is an American actor and comedian. His prominent roles include Champ Kind in the Anchorman film series (2004–2013) and Todd Packer in The Office (2005–2013).

Koechner first became involved in performing when he began studying improvisational comedy in Chicago at ImprovOlympic, before joining the Second City Northwest. Koechner relocated to New York City in 1995, doing sketch comedy as a cast member on Saturday Night Live (1995–1996) and as a sketch regular on Late Night with Conan O'Brien in the mid-1990s. In 1997, Koechner moved to Los Angeles and started working regularly in various film and television comedies, making his first film appearances with small roles in the films such as Wag the Dog, Austin Powers: The Spy Who Shagged Me and Man on the Moon.

While filming the country mockumentary film Dill Scallion in 1998, Koechner befriended actor/comedian Dave 'Gruber' Allen, and eventually began performing as the comedy duo, The Naked Trucker and T-Bones Show, a live musical comedy act. The act became a hit at Hollywood clubs such as Largo, and Allen and Koechner were invited to open for Tenacious D. In 2007, Koechner and Allen created and starred together in a Naked Trucker & T-Bones Show sketch comedy series that ran for one season on Comedy Central.

After his breakout role as Champ Kind in the 2004 comedy Anchorman, Koechner began appearing frequently with larger supporting roles in many high-profile comedic films including Talladega Nights, Thank You for Smoking, Waiting..., Semi-Pro, The Goods: Live Hard, Sell Hard and Extract. His first leading film role was Coach Lambeau Fields in sports comedy, The Comebacks (2007). More recently, Koechner reprised his role of Champ Kind for Anchorman 2: The Legend Continues, co-starred in the horror-comedy Krampus, and received praise from critics for his dark turn in the 2014 black comedy Cheap Thrills. He co-starred in the sitcoms Bless This Mess and Superior Donuts and recurred on Another Period and on the revival of Twin Peaks. He made regular appearances on the sitcom The Goldbergs and currently provides the voice of Dick Reynolds on American Dad!.

== Early life and education ==
Koechner was born on August 24, 1962, in Tipton, Missouri, to Margaret Ann (née Downey) and Cecil Stephen Koechner. He has two brothers, Mark and Joe, and three sisters, Mary-Rose, Cecilia, Joan. His father ran a business that manufactured turkey coops (Koechner has stated that "If you see a turkey going down the road in a big truck, most likely its coop is from Tipton..."). He was raised Catholic, and is of German, English, and Irish descent. Koechner studied Political Science at Benedictine College and the University of Missouri, before he eventually decided to pursue a career in improvisational comedy and moved to Chicago. After studying at Chicago's ImprovOlympic, under famed improvisation instructor Del Close, Koechner joined The Second City comedy troupe in Chicago, graduating in 1994.

== Career ==
=== Early career ===
In 1995, Koechner landed a year-long stint on Saturday Night Live, joining the show with Second City friends Nancy Walls and Adam McKay. During his time at SNL, he befriended guest-writer David 'Gruber' Allen, and castmate Will Ferrell. Some of Koechner's recurring skits included Bill Brasky, the British Fops (playing Fagan, opposite Mark McKinney), Gary Macdonald (the fictional younger brother of Weekend Update anchor/SNL castmember Norm Macdonald, based on "Jokey", a character he originated at Second City), Will Ferrell's "Get Off the Shed" sketches (playing his neighbor, Tom Taylor), and Gerald "T-Bones" Tibbons. Koechner impersonated several celebrities, including Christian Elliott, Mike Ditka, Charlie Sheen, Robert Shapiro, Willard Scott, Oliver Stone, Phil Gramm, David Kaczynski, and Pat Buchanan. After his one-season on SNL, Koechner joined the 1996–97 sketch cast of Late Night with Conan O'Brien. Koechner later said that his firing was due to NBC executives like Don Ohlmeyer, and not so much series creator Lorne Michaels, who wanted to keep Koechner on. Koechner also stated that McKinney was also on the chopping block, but assumed that his close relationship with Michaels is what kept McKinney on the next season.

=== Partnership with David "Gruber" Allen ===
On the set of the 1999 country music mockumentary, Dill Scallion, Koechner struck a partnership with SNL colleague David "Gruber" Allen, joining Allen's improvisational comedy act, The Naked Trucker Show.

Koechner joined the act as Gerald "T-Bones" Tibbons, a character he had been playing on comedy stages for a few years, including a recurring character bit on SNL. Gerald Tibbons dates back to 1995, when he filmed a short television pilot based on the character's misadventures. The "Gerald" character, based on a real drifter named Four-Way George, became so popular that Koechner would go to auditions, only to find that directors were always demanding his stage persona. The stage act, a mix of stand-up comedy and off-color country songs, became a hit on the Hollywood improv circuit, ultimately landing television performances on Late Night with Conan O'Brien, Jimmy Kimmel Live! and Real Time with Bill Maher. The Naked Trucker and T-Bones Show toured with fellow comedic musical duo, Tenacious D.

=== 2004–2006 ===
In 2004, Koechner landed his largest film role up to that point, as sports reporter Champ Kind in Anchorman: The Legend of Ron Burgundy. As part of the Anchorman ensemble, Koechner shared two MTV Movie Award nominations for Best On-Screen Team and Best Musical Performance. MTV's initial press release accidentally listed Fred Armisen instead of David Koechner, but eventually corrected the error on their website, crediting Koechner during the broadcast. Following this role, he landed small and supporting roles in such films such The 40-Year-Old Virgin, Talladega Nights, The Dukes of Hazzard and Snakes on a Plane. In 2006, he made his voice acting debut in Barnyard as "Dag". That same year, he had a supporting role as a gun lobbyist in the critically acclaimed satire, Thank You for Smoking. Thank You for Smoking was one of the best-reviewed films of Koechner's career, and he was included in Fox Searchlight's Oscar campaign, among the film's listings for Best Supporting Actor.

After co-starring in Anchorman and The 40-Year-Old Virgin, fellow Second City alum Steve Carell personally recommended Koechner for a recurring role on NBC's The Office, playing Todd Packer. Koechner's role is the American version of Chris Finch from the original. Packer is an obnoxious, alcoholic best friend of Carell's character. Koechner guest-starred, both in person and voice, on fifteen episodes of the series. His frequent work with actors Ferrell, Carell, Jack Black, and Ben Stiller have led some critics and journalists to point out his association with the media-dubbed "Frat Pack". David had a guest starring role as Uncle Earl in an episode on Hannah Montana.

=== 2007–present ===
In 2007, Koechner was seen in his first leading role in The Comebacks (which opened on October 19), the first comedy to be released under Fox Searchlight's Fox Atomic division. He played a college football coach with the worst record in the history of the sport who vows to turn things around with his new team of ragtag recruits. He described this career opportunity as the "first lead for the right-hander." Veteran actor Carl Weathers played Koechner's rival coach. Though Koechner, who usually writes and improvises his material, had no involvement with the screenplay, he complimented director Tom Brady for taking "great care to make it as smart as he could", adding that it is a sports comedy rather than a spoof.

On January 17, 2007, Comedy Central premiered The Naked Trucker and T-Bones Show, a sketch comedy series starring Koechner (as T-Bones) and longtime performing partner Dave "Gruber" Allen (as The Naked Trucker). The duo performs their unique brand of off-color songs and introduces pre-taped skits. Many of Koechner's past co-stars made cameos, including Will Ferrell, Jack Black, Steve Carell, Andy Richter, Dax Shepard, and Paul Rudd. The pre-taped skits gave Koechner more screen time than Allen, often letting him showcase his comedic charisma alongside guest stars like Richter and Shepard. Comedy Central ordered eight episodes.

In the eight years Koechner & Allen have been playing these characters, there have been several attempts to bring the act to television, but they had trouble figuring how to translate it into a series. Koechner & Allen's first album, Naked Trucker and T-Bones Live at the Troubador, was released March 20, 2007. Koechner co-starred with Luke Wilson in the 2009 indie-comedy Tenure and was a lead in the 2012 horror film Piranha 3DD. Koechner returned as Champ Kind, in Anchorman 2: The Legend Continues (2013).

Following the release of Live at the Troubador, Koechner revealed that a T-Bones film is in development with Will Ferrell and Adam McKay's Gary Sanchez Productions. Koechner wrote the script with veteran television writer/producer Norm Hiscock, who also wrote for The Naked Trucker and T-Bones Show, in addition to past work on Saturday Night Live, The Kids in the Hall, and King of the Hill. He made his first return guest appearance to Saturday Night Live on December 7, 2013, with his fellow Anchorman co-stars Will Ferrell, Steve Carell, and the episode's host, Paul Rudd. The Anchorman stars sang "Afternoon Delight" with the episode's musical guest One Direction during the opening monologue. Koechner and Ferrell also reprised their Bill Brasky sketch in the same episode.

In 2015, Koechner began co-starring as Commodore Bellacourt in the Comedy Central series Another Period. He also recurs as Bill Lewis on The Goldbergs.

In a contrast to his largely comedy-based acting career, Koechner starred in the 2016 drama Priceless, a film about human trafficking. He said of the role, "My wife and I have five kids – three of them are daughters. So, just to imagine the horror of any young lady having to go through this. This film is based on true events. It's happening right now. It's happening in Chicago. It's happening here in Los Angeles. It's happening globally. So, to be a participant in a film like this – to bring awareness to such a horror – makes me happy."

In 2023, Koechner began portraying "Vice President of Party" for a regional marketing campaign for Harrah's Cherokee Casinos. The fictional character is a casino employee in charge of making sure guests have a good time.

== Personal life ==
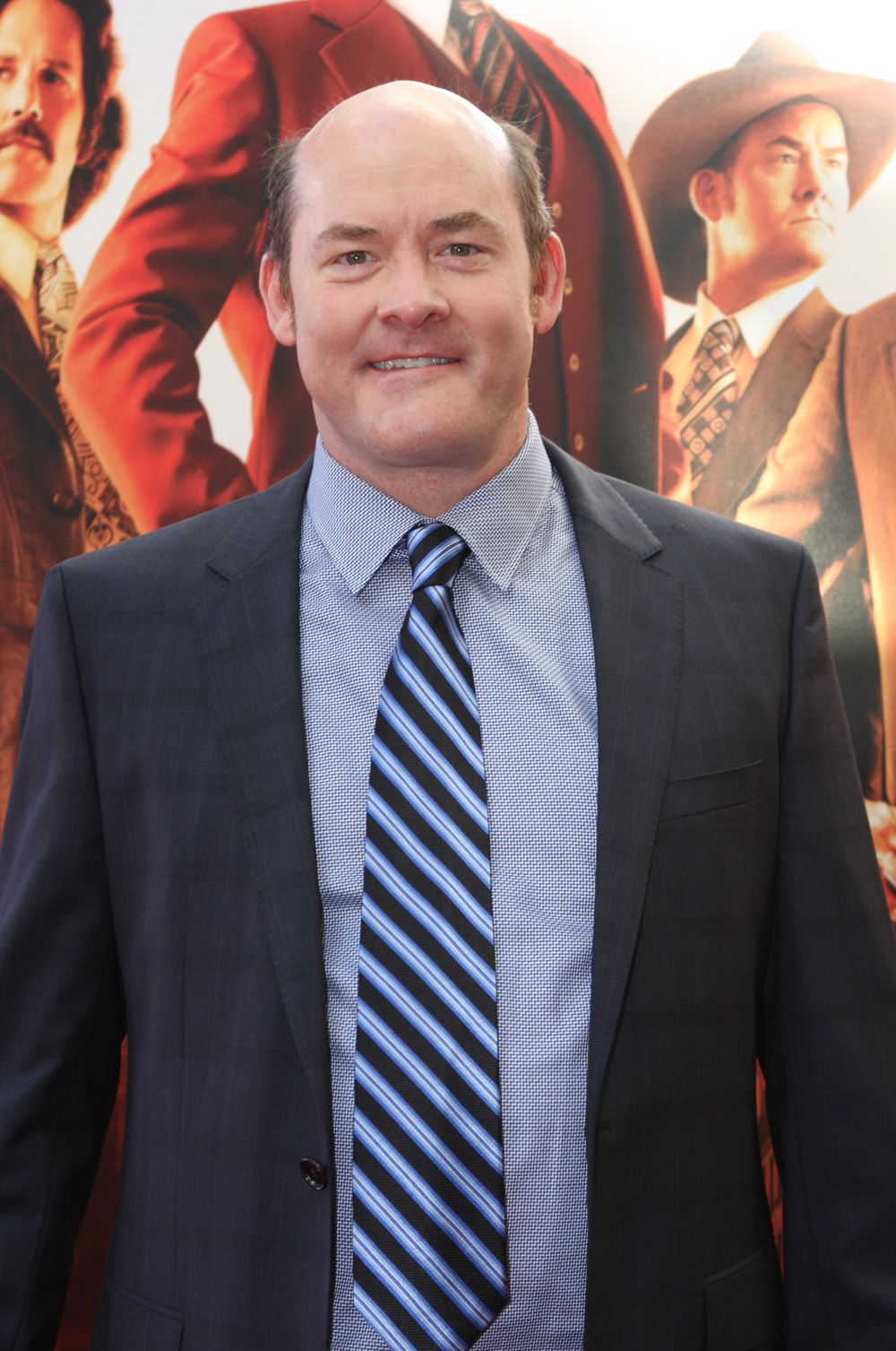
Koechner in 2013

Koechner lives in Los Angeles and married his wife Leigh in 1998. They have five children. Koechner has the names of his wife and children tattooed on his right upper-arm. In 2020, Koechner filed for divorce.

Koechner performs regularly in Los Angeles comedy clubs such as Flappers Comedy Club, Improv Olympic, West Theater (in the show Beer Shark Mice), and Largo, the nightclub where the Naked Trucker Show plays regularly. Koechner supported the 2004 US presidential campaign of Senator John Kerry, performing at a June 6, 2004, Hollywood fundraiser for the senator, where The Naked Trucker & T-Bones opened up for Tenacious D.

On December 31, 2021, Koechner was arrested on New Year's Eve for a suspected DUI and hit and run in Simi Valley, California. A court date was set in Ventura, California; he was charged with a DUI and hit and run.

On June 4, 2022, Koechner was arrested for DUI in Ohio.

== Filmography ==
=== Film ===
Year	Film	Role	Notes
1995	It's Now... or NEVER!	Jay	
1997	Wag the Dog	Director	
1998	Dirty Work	Anton Phillips	
1999	Man on the Moon	National Enquirer Reporter	
1999	Austin Powers: The Spy Who Shagged Me	Co-pilot	
1999	Dill Scallion	Bubba Pearl	
2000	Whatever It Takes	Virgil Doolittle	
2000	Dropping Out	Henry	
2001	Out Cold	Stumpy	
2001	Life Without Dick	Uncle Hurley	
2002	Waking Up in Reno	Bell Hop	
2002	American Girl	Guy in Fun Fun Land TV Commercial	
2002	The Third Wheel	Carl	
2002	Run Ronnie Run!	Clay	
2003	My Boss's Daughter	Speed	
2003	A Guy Thing	Buck Morse	
2003	Soul Mates	Steve	
2004	Anchorman: The Legend of Ron Burgundy	Champ Kind	Nominated—MTV Movie Award for Best On-Screen Team (shared with Will Ferrell, Steve Carell and Paul Rudd); Nominated—MTV Movie Award for Best Musical Performance (shared with Will Ferrell, Steve Carell and Paul Rudd)
2004	Wake Up, Ron Burgundy: The Lost Movie	Champ Kind	
2005	Yours, Mine & Ours	Darrell	
2005	Daltry Calhoun	Doyle Earl	
2005	Here Comes Peter Cottontail: The Movie	Elroy/Wind	Voice only
2005	The 40-Year-Old Virgin	Dad at Health Clinic	
2005	The Dukes of Hazzard	Cooter	
2005	Waiting...	Dan	
2006	Unaccompanied Minors	Ernie Wellington	
2006	Tenacious D in The Pick of Destiny	Surplus Store Clerk	Scene Deleted
2006	Let's Go to Prison	Shanahan	
2006	Snakes on a Plane	Richard "Rick"	
2006	Barnyard	Dag	Voice only
2006	Talladega Nights: The Ballad of Ricky Bobby	Herschell	
2006	Thank You for Smoking	Bobby Jay Bliss	
2006	Larry the Cable Guy: Health Inspector	Donnie	
2007	The Comebacks	Lambeau Fields	
2007	Wild Girls Gone	Mr. Fremont	
2007	Reno 911!: Miami	Sheriff of Aspen	
2007	Balls of Fury	Rick the Birdmaster	
2007	Farce of the Penguins	Melvin	Voice only
2007	Careless	Lizard	
2008	Semi-Pro	The Commissioner	
2008	Drillbit Taylor	Frightened Dad	
2008	Get Smart	Agent Larabee	
2008	Sex Drive	Hitchhiker	
2008	The Perfect Game	Charlie	
2009	Still Waiting...	Dan	
2009	Extract	Nathan	
2009	The Goods: Live Hard, Sell Hard	Brent Gage	
2009	Tenure	Jay Hadley	
2009	My One and Only	Bill Massey	
2011	Paul	Gus	
2011	Final Destination 5	Dennis Lapman	
2011	A Good Old Fashioned Orgy	Vic George	
2011	Fully Loaded	Dave Koechner	
2012	This Means War	Ollie	
2012	Piranha 3DD	Chet	
2012	Wedding Day	Pastor Augustus	
2012	Hit and Run	Sanders	
2012	Small Apartments	Detective O'Grady	
2013	A Haunted House	Dan Kearney	
2013	Cheap Thrills	Colin	
2013	Anchorman 2: The Legend Continues	Champ Kind	
2013	Crawlspace	Chuck the Exterminator	
2014	Hits	Rich	
2014	No Clue	Ernie	
2014	Jason Nash Is Married	Scooter	
2015	Road Hard	Chad	
2015	Regular Show: The Movie	Principal Dean	Voice only
2015	Hell and Back	Asmodeus	Voice only
2015	Scouts Guide to the Zombie Apocalypse	Scout Leader Rogers	
2015	Krampus	Howard	
2016	Priceless	Dale	
2017	CHiPs	Pat	
2017	How to Get Girls	Principal B.	
2017	Bernard and Huey	Huey	
2017	I'm Not Here	Dad's Attorney	
2017	The Pine Tar Incident: Making of Tar Wars	Director	
2017	Gnome Alone	Zamfeer	Voice
2018	Then Came You	Bob Lewis	
2018	All Creatures Here Below	Robert	
2019	3 Days with Dad	Dr. Clarence Grey	
2019	Braking for Whales	Uncle Randall Hillhouse	
2020	Faith Based	Butch Savage	
2020	The Dark Divide	Shayne	
2020	Vicious Fun	Zachary	
2020	Reboot Camp	Himself	
2021	The Right One	Bob Glasser	
2021	A Week Away	David	
2021	Match Struck	Unknown Man	
2021	National Champions	Richard Everly	
2022	Marmaduke	Phil	Voice only
2022	Dotty & Soul	Brannigan	
2022	Izzy Lyon: The Unspun Truth	Antoine St. Pupon	
2022	Diamond in the Rough	Bill Fisher	
2022	Wrong Reasons	Marshall Winandi	
2023	Match Struck	Unknown Man	
2023	The Allnighter	Bruce	
2023	Ganymede	Pastor Royer	
2024	Half Baked: Totally High	Diesel	
2025	Attack of the Killer Tomatoes: Organic Intelligence	U.S. President's Press Secretary	
TBA	The Decline of Fucking Western Civilization		Filming

=== Television ===
Year	Show	Role	Notes
1995–1996	Saturday Night Live	Cast member	20 episodes
1996	The Jamie Foxx Show	Stephen Queen	Episode: "A Killer Ending"
1996	Something So Right	Man	Episode: "Something About a Christmas Miracle"
1997	Mad About You	Store Clerk	Episode: "Uncle Phil and the Coupons"
1998	The Love Boat: The Next Wave	Charles	Episode: "Getting to Know You"
1999	Get Real	Roger	Episode: "Pilot"
1999	Dharma & Greg	Joe	Episode: "See Dharma Run"
2000	Freaks and Geeks	Waiter	Episode: "Carded and Discarded"
2000	The Norm Show	Lance	Episode: "Norm vs. the Oldest Profession"
2002	Late World with Zach	Various	Recurring role
2002	Curb Your Enthusiasm	Joseph	Episode: "Mary, Joseph and Larry"
2002	Greg the Bunny	Paintball Instructor	Episode: "Jewel Heist"
2002–2003	Still Standing	Carl	9 episodes
2002–2003	Whatever Happened to Robot Jones?	Clancy Q. Sleepyjeans (voice)	7 episodes
2003	Comedy Central Laughs for Life Telethon 2003	Jerry Prastis/Gerald Tibbons/Various	TV special
2003	Wanda at Large	Roger	Unaired pilot
2003–2006	Reno 911!	Various characters	3 episodes
2005–2013	The Office	Todd Packer	15 episodes
2006	Harvey Birdman, Attorney at Law	Cubby McQuilkin (voice)	Episode: "Babysitter"
2007	The Naked Trucker and T-Bones Show	Gerald "T-Bones" Tibbons	Star, writer, producer, co-creator
2007	American Body Shop	Trey	Episode: "Shop for Sale"
2007	Monk	Joey Krenshaw	2 episodes
2008	Kath & Kim	Pete	Episode: "Friends"
2008	King of the Hill	Frank (voice)	Episode: "Six Characters in Search of a House"
2008	Pushing Daisies	Merle McQuoddy	Episode: "The Legend of Merle McQuoddy"
2008–2010	Hannah Montana	Uncle Earl	3 episodes
2008–present	American Dad!	Dick / various characters (voice)	37 episodes
2009	Glenn Martin, DDS	Unknown (voice)	Episode: "Deck the Malls"
2009	The Goode Family	Cranky (voice)	Episode: "A Goode Game of Chicken"
2009	Head Case	Himself	2 episodes
2009–2010	Hank	Grady Funk	10 episodes
2010	Gary Unmarried	Joe "Soup" Campbell	Episode: "Gary's Big Mouth"
2010	Neighbors from Hell	Robert the Insult Weight Loss Robot (voice)	3 episodes
2010	Glory Daze	Baseball Coach	Episode: "Pilot"
2010–2011	Funny or Die Presents	Various characters	3 episodes
2011	Beavis and Butt-Head	Various characters (voice)	4 episodes
2011	Chuck	Crazy Bob	Episode: "Chuck Versus the Business Trip"
2011	Good Vibes	Various characters (voice)	2 episodes
2011	Kung Fu Panda: Legends of Awesomeness	Dosu (voice)	Episode: "Hometown Hero"
2012	Comedy Bang! Bang!	Mr. Doublebutt	Episode: "Amy Poehler Wears a Black Jacket & Grey Pants"
2012	The Inbetweeners	Jim Remus	Episode: "The Field Trip"
2013	The Middle	Jeff Webber	Episode: "The Friend"
2013	Behind the Candelabra	Adoption Attorney	Television film
2013	Randy Cunningham: 9th Grade Ninja	Mac Antfee (voice)	3 episodes
2013	Psych	Leslie Valerie Sally	Episode: "Office Space"
2013	Phineas and Ferb	Rusty Britches (voice)	Episode: "Terrifying Tri-State Trilogy of Terror"
2014	Justified	Deputy Gregg Sutter	2 episodes
2014	Maron	Himself	Episode: "Therapy"
2015	Sofia the First	Muck (voice)	Episode: "Minding the Manor"
2015	Full Circle	Phil Davis	4 episodes
2015–2016	Regular Show	Principal Dean / Jayden (voice)	5 episodes
2015–2017	All Hail King Julien	Rob / Nurse Phantom / Phantom, Butterfly Prince (voice)	11 episodes
2015–2023	The Goldbergs	Bill Lewis	38 episodes
2015–2019	Drunk History	Diego Columbus / Edwin Forrest / John Pastore / Theodore Roosevelt	4 episodes
2015–2019	Another Period	Commodore Bellacourt	Series regular; 18 episodes
2015–2021	F is for Family	Robert "Bob Pogo" Pogrohovich (voice)	32 episodes
2016	Angie Tribeca	Commissioner Bigfish	Episode: "Commissioner Bigfish"
2016	Bajillion Dollar Propertie$	Roger Ramsey	Episode: "Roger Me Rightly"
2016	Hidden America with Jonah Ray	Mayor Marty Lehrman	Episode: "Chicago: The Second Best City"
2016	The Soul Man	Denny Doyle	Episode: "Southern Discomfort"
2016	TripTank	Buck LaFontaine / Gary / Frank (voice)	2 episodes
2016	Tween Fest	Congressman Rich Halstrom	Episode: "Congressman-Ass Bitch"
2016	Future-Worm!	Coach (voice)	2 episodes
2017	Bones	Jack Flap	Episode: "The Flaw in the Saw"
2017	All Hail King Julien: Exiled	Nurse Phantom (voice)	Episode: "The Most Eggcellent Adventure"
2017	Twin Peaks	Detective Fusco	4 episodes
2017	Future Man	Barry Futturman	Episode: "A Blowjob Before Dying"
2017	Stan Against Evil	Kenny	2 episodes
2017	Rhett and Link's Buddy System	Jimbo / Jumbo	Episode: "Sanctuary"
2017	Hell's Kitchen	Himself	Guest diner and Shane's Inspiration contributor; Episode: "It's All Gravy"
2017–2018	Superior Donuts	Carl "Tush" Tushinski	Series regular
2018	Trolls: The Beat Goes On!	Buzby (voice)	3 episodes
2018	Bobcat Goldthwait's Misfits & Monsters	'Swell' Del Wainwright	Episode: "Face in the Car Lot"
2018	Ask the StoryBots	Pirate	Episode: "How Do Volcanoes Work?"
2018–2020	The Epic Tales of Captain Underpants	Mr. Meaner (voice)	18 episodes + 3 specials
2019–2020	Bless This Mess	Beau Bowman	Series regular
2019	Schooled	Bill Lewis	Episode: "Be Like Mike"
2019	Crank Yankers	Ray Erbst	Episode: "Adam Carolla, David Koechner & Natasha Leggero"
2020	At Home with Amy Sedaris	Clovis	Episode: "Outdoor Entertaining"
2021	Close Enough	Wyatt Trickle (voice)	Episode: "Meet the Frackers"
2021	Tacoma FD	Bernard Spatchcock	Episode: "Thanksgiving"
2021	The Bitch Who Stole Christmas	Mr. E	Television Film
2022–2023	Puppy Dog Pals	Willie (voice)	Credited as Dave Koechner; 7 episodes
2023	Justified: City Primeval	Greg Sutter	Episode: "The Question"
2023	Underdeveloped	Brent Arnold	6 episodes
2023–2024	Krapopolis	Poseidon (voice)	2 episodes
2025	A Week Away: The Series	David	7 episodes
2025	It's Florida, Man	Uncle Matt	Episode: "Moonshine"
2026	Adventure Time: Side Quests	Perfumer Truck / Dead Digg-O (voice)	Episode: "The Notorious Pup Gang"

=== Music videos ===
Year	Title	Artist
2010	"Baby We Were Young"	The Dirty Guv'nahs
2011	"New Romance"	Miles Fisher
2011	"Weed Card"	Garfunkel and Oates
