= Nancy Carell =

American actress, comedian and writer (born 1966)

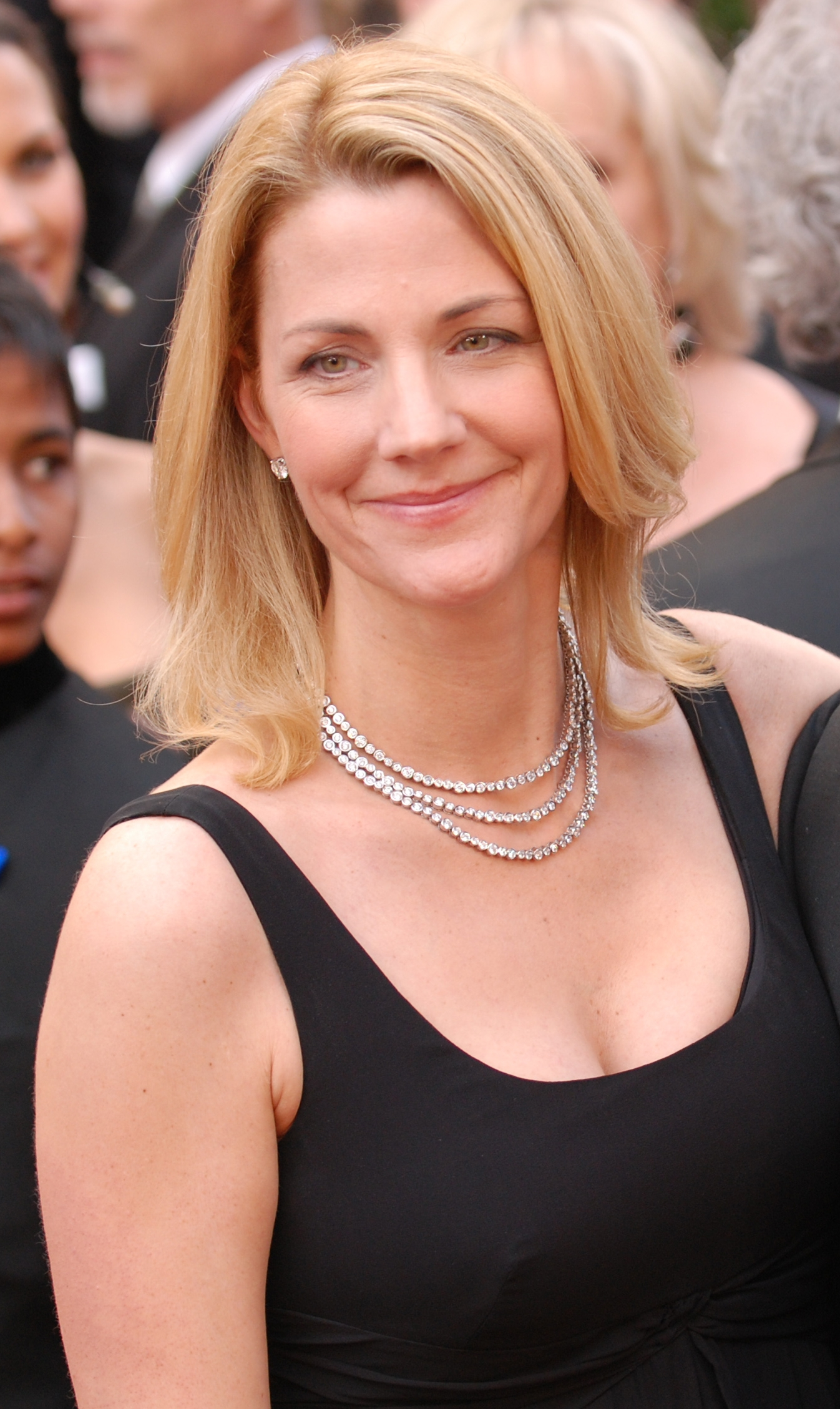
- Carell at the 2010 Academy Awards
- Born: Nancy Ellen Walls; July 19, 1966 (age 60); Cohasset, Massachusetts, U.S.
- Education: Boston College
- Occupations: Actress; comedian; writer
- Years active: 1995–present
- Spouse: Steve Carell (m. 1995)
- Children: 2

Nancy Ellen Walls Carell (born July 19, 1966) is an American actress, comedian, and writer best known for her work on Saturday Night Live, The Daily Show, and The Office. In 2016, she co-created the TBS comedy series Angie Tribeca with her husband, Steve Carell.

== Early life and education ==
Carell (née Walls) was born in Cohasset, Massachusetts. She graduated from Boston College in 1988. As a college student, she was a member of the improvisational troupe "My Mother's Fleabag".

== Career ==
Carell got her start in comedy at The Second City in Chicago and, like many of the troupe's alumni, went on to join the cast of Saturday Night Live (1995–1996), where she was best known for her impression of CNN anchor Bobbie Battista. She later held a correspondent position on the satirical TV news program The Daily Show. She voiced the character of Helen Goode on the Mike Judge-created animated series The Goode Family on ABC, where she was credited for the first time as Nancy Carell instead of Nancy Walls. Carell occasionally guest-starred on The Office, which starred her husband, Steve Carell, until 2013, as Carol Stills, a real estate agent and former girlfriend of her husband's character, Michael Scott. She also had a brief appearance in the movie Bridesmaids.

Carell and her husband, Steve, created the TBS comedy series Angie Tribeca starring Rashida Jones. The series premiered on January 17, 2016.

== Personal life ==
Carell is married to actor and comedian Steve Carell, whom she met when she was a student in an improvisation class he was teaching at Second City. They have two children, Elisabeth and John.

== Filmography ==
=== Film ===
Year	Title	Role	Notes
2003	Anger Management	Flight Attendant	
2005	The 40-Year-Old Virgin	Health Clinic Counselor	
2011	Bridesmaids	Helen's Tennis Partner	
2012	Seeking a Friend for the End of the World	Linda	

=== Television ===
Year	Title	Role	Notes
1995–1996; 2008; 2018	Saturday Night Live	Various characters	Main role (season 21); Guest (season 33, 44); 19 episodes
1998	LateLine	Jill	Episode: "Pearce's New Buddy"
1999	Random Play	Various characters	3 episodes
1999–2002; 2015	The Daily Show	Herself (correspondent)	90 episodes
2005–2006; 2010–2011; 2013	The Office	Carol Stills	Recurring role (season 2–3); Guest (season 7, 9); 8 episodes
2007	The Naked Trucker and T-Bones Show	Marcia	Episode: "T-Bones TV"
2009	The Goode Family	Helen Goode (voice)	Main role; 13 episodes
2012	Georgia	Davinia	Episode: "Hello, I'm Davinia"
2016	Angie Tribeca	Katie Perry	Recurring role (season 1–2); 2 episodes Also co-creator, executive producer and writer
2026	Rooster	Susan Riggs	2 episodes
