= Busy Tonight =

American late-night talk show

- Genre: Late-night talk show
- Directed by: Liz Plonka
- Presented by: Busy Philipps
- Theme music composer: James Vincent McMorrow
- Ending theme: "Goodnight, Love; Busy Tonight" by Busy Philipps
- Composer: Jeff Richmond
- Country of origin: United States
- Original language: English
- No. of seasons: 1
- No. of episodes: 105

Production
- Executive producers: Tina Fey; Busy Philipps; Caissie St. Onge; Eric Gurian; Julie Darmody; David Miner
- Editors: Tony Conte III; Toni Anne Carabello
- Running time: 21 minutes
- Production companies: Little Stranger, inc.; Busy Bee Productions; Wilshire Studios

Original release
- Network: E!
- Release: October 28, 2018 – May 16, 2019

Busy Tonight is an American late-night talk show hosted by Busy Philipps. It aired from October 28, 2018 to May 16, 2019 on E!.

== Premise ==
Busy Tonight features "everyone's favorite unfiltered Hollywood best friend giving her hilarious and outspoken opinions on the latest pop culture stories and trending topics, with candid celebrity guest interviews and original comedic segments."

== Production ==
On May 1, 2018, it was announced that E! had given a series order to a new late-night talk show to be hosted by actress Busy Philipps. Executive producers were expected to include Julie Darmody, Eric Gurian and Philipps. Production companies involved with the series were slated to consist of Little Stranger.

On August 16, 2018, it was announced that Caissie St. Onge had been hired to serve as the series' showrunner as well as an additional executive producer. Additionally, it was announced that the series would premiere on October 28, 2018 at 10 PM and that episodes of the series were expected to air each week from Sunday to Wednesday at 10 PM EST. On October 25, 2018, it was reported that Tina Fey and David Miner had joined the series as executive producers and that Wilshire Studios would serve as an additional production company. Furthermore, it was revealed that first week guests would include Mindy Kaling, Vanessa Hudgens, Kristen Bell and Megan Mullally along with appearances by Jimmy Kimmel, Fred Armisen, and Andy Cohen. Other first season guests were expected to include Julia Roberts, Kim Kardashian, Tracee Ellis Ross, Camila Mendes, John Stamos, Olivia Munn, Beth Behrs, Lauren Graham, Jesse Tyler Ferguson, Emily Ratajkowski, Taran Killam, David Alan Grier, Tess Holliday and Tom Lenk.

On January 3, 2019, it was reported that the show would be moving to a new time slot at 11 PM EST beginning on January 7, 2019. Additionally, it was reported that the show would air a live television special titled "Busy Tonight Live: Golden Globes After Party" that was to broadcast immediately following the conclusion of the 76th Golden Globe Awards. Guests for the special were expected to include Whitney Cummings, Karamo Brown, River Butcher and Ira Madison III.

On May 5, 2019, Philipps announced that the series had been cancelled, with all remaining episodes airing until May 16. Philipps also stated the series would be shopped to other networks but it was not picked up.

== Episodes ==
=== 2018 ===
No.	Featured guest(s)	Original release date
1	"Mindy Kaling"	October 28, 2018
Additional appearances by Samantha Bee, Andy Cohen, Stephen Colbert, Jimmy Kimmel, Seth Meyers and Andy Richter
2	"Vanessa Hudgens"	October 29, 2018
3	"Kristen Bell"	October 30, 2018
4	"Megan Mullally"	October 31, 2018
5	"Julia Roberts"	November 4, 2018
6	"John Stamos"	November 5, 2018
7	"Olivia Munn"	November 6, 2018
8	"Emily Ratajkowski"	November 7, 2018
9	"Tina Fey & Tom Lenk"	November 11, 2018
Additional appearances by Grant Show, Elizabeth Gillies and Marc Silverstein
10	"Camila Mendes"	November 12, 2018
11	"Taran Killam"	November 13, 2018
12	"Tess Holliday"	November 14, 2018
13	"Lauren Graham"	November 18, 2018
14	"Ike Barinholtz"	November 19, 2018
15	"D'Arcy Carden"	November 20, 2018
16	"Beth Behrs"	November 21, 2018
17	"Tracee Ellis Ross"	November 25, 2018
18	"David Alan Grier"	November 26, 2018
19	"Oliver Hudson"	November 27, 2018
20	"Padma Lakshmi"	November 28, 2018
21	"Brian Tyree Henry"	December 2, 2018
22	"Jenna Dewan"	December 3, 2018
23	"Max Greenfield"	December 4, 2018
24	"Chrissy Metz"	December 5, 2018
25	"Kim Kardashian"	December 9, 2018
26	"Wilmer Valderrama"	December 10, 2018
27	"Maura Tierney & Katie Lee"	December 11, 2018
28	"Jesse Tyler Ferguson"	December 12, 2018
29	"Julie Bowen"	December 17, 2018
30	"Leslie Grossman"	December 18, 2018
31	"Nicole Byer"	December 19, 2018
32	"Keke Palmer"	December 20, 2018
Additional appearance by Oprah Winfrey

=== 2019 ===
No.	Featured guest(s)	Original release date
33	"Golden Globes After Party"	January 6, 2019
Guests include: Whitney Cummings, Tom Lenk, River Butcher, Ira Madison III & Sam Greisman
34	"William Jackson Harper"	January 7, 2019
35	"Howie Mandel"	January 8, 2019
36	"Connie Britton"	January 9, 2019
37	"Patti LaBelle"	January 10, 2019
38	"Susan Kelechi Watson"	January 14, 2019
39	"Linda Cardellini"	January 15, 2019
40	"Andy Samberg & Donte Colley"	January 16, 2019
Additional appearance by Akiva Schaffer
41	"Sarah Chalke"	January 17, 2019
42	"Terry Crews"	January 21, 2019
43	"Jonathan Van Ness"	January 22, 2019
44	"Cobie Smulders"	January 23, 2019
45	"Josh Radnor"	January 24, 2019
46	"Aldis Hodge featuring Tom Lenk"	January 28, 2019
47	"Chris Sullivan"	January 29, 2019
48	"Josh Groban"	January 30, 2019
49	"Cecily Strong"	January 31, 2019
50	"Nina Dobrev"	February 4, 2019
51	"Ron Funches"	February 5, 2019
52	"Jemima Kirke & Katelyn Ohashi"	February 6, 2019
53	"Michelle Williams"	February 7, 2019
54	"Daniel Radcliffe"	February 11, 2019
55	"Eliza Coupe"	February 12, 2019
56	"Adam Devine"	February 13, 2019
57	"Pete Holmes"	February 14, 2019
58	"Kandi Burruss"	February 18, 2019
59	"The Bella Twins"	February 19, 2019
60	"Mark Duplass"	February 20, 2019
Additional appearance by Wolfgang Puck
61	"Sonequa Martin-Green featuring James Vincent McMorrow"	February 21, 2019
62	"Phoebe Robinson & Christian Siriano"	February 25, 2019
Additional appearance by Tom Lenk
63	"Jenna Fischer"	February 26, 2019
Additional appearance by Steve Carell
64	"Isla Fisher"	February 27, 2019
65	"Shane West"	February 28, 2019
66	"America Ferrera"	March 4, 2019
Additional appearance by Gigi Gorgeous
67	"Margaret Cho & Elizabeth Chambers"	March 5, 2019
68	"Lauren Cohan & Toni Harris"	March 6, 2019
69	"Justina Machado, Rita Moreno & Gloria Calderon Kellett"	March 7, 2019
70	"Eric McCormack"	March 11, 2019
71	"Maya Erskine & Anna Konkle"	March 12, 2019
72	"Christina Hendricks"	March 13, 2019
Additional appearance by Retta
73	"Rita Wilson & Johnathan Rice"	March 14, 2019
74	"Cole Sprouse & Haley Lu Richardson"	March 18, 2019
75	"Taye Diggs"	March 19, 2019
76	"Lisa Rinna"	March 20, 2019
77	"Courteney Cox"	March 21, 2019
Additional appearances by Ian Gomez, Josh Hopkins, and Christa Miller
78	"Joseph Gordon-Levitt"	April 1, 2019
79	"Logic"	April 2, 2019
80	"Jaime King, Justin Chu Cary, Jessica Cauffiel & Brittany Daniel"	April 3, 2019
81	"Natalie Morales"	April 4, 2019
Additional appearance by Karley Sciortino
82	"Mandy Moore"	April 8, 2019
Additional appearance by Chris Sullivan
83	"Tony Hale"	April 9, 2019
84	"Michelle Monaghan & Whitney Cummings"	April 10, 2019
85	"Nikolaj Coster-Waldau"	April 11, 2019
86	"Cedric the Entertainer & Tom Lenk"	April 15, 2019
87	"Robin Tunney"	April 16, 2019
88	"DeWanda Wise & Brittany Snow"	April 17, 2019
Additional appearances by Chris Harrison and Colton Underwood
89	"Chad Michael Murray"	April 18, 2019
90	"Lizzo"	April 22, 2019
91	"Ben Feldman & Duff Goldman"	April 23, 2019
Additional appearance by Jon Barinholtz
92	"Colin Hanks"	April 24, 2019
93	"Lake Bell, Steve Lemme & Kevin Heffernan"	April 25, 2019
94	"Martin Short"	April 29, 2019
95	"Geena Davis"	April 30, 2019
96	"Emma Roberts"	May 1, 2019
97	"Michael Ealy"	May 2, 2019
98	"Retta"	May 6, 2019
Additional appearance by Andrew Bird
99	"Topher Grace, Angela Kinsey & Joshua Snyder"	May 7, 2019
Additional appearance by Tom Lenk
100	"Josh Hopkins & Kevin Morby"	May 8, 2019
101	"Tom Ellis & Rachael Harris"	May 9, 2019
Additional appearances by Kristin Hensley and Jen Smedley
102	"Tina Fey, Amy Poehler, Maya Rudolph, Ana Gasteyer & Paula Pell"	May 13, 2019
103	"Chelsea Handler & Middle Kids"	May 14, 2019
104	"Leslie Mann"	May 15, 2019
Additional appearances by David Letterman and Brendan Fraser
105	"Surprise Guests!"	May 16, 2019
Guests include: Linda Cardellini. Michelle Williams, Jennifer Carpenter, Whitney Cummings and Christa Miller

== Reception ==
In a negative review, Variety's Daniel D'Addario discussed the show's lack of identity in its first week saying, "talk demands a crystal-clear point-of-view and Busy Tonight has yet to find that, making its endless references to the language of self-help and its production excesses like the nightly lullaby feel like the antic search for a personality, not the expression of one. Some things about television shows we’ve seen before are worth keeping." In another unfavorable critique, The Ringer's Rob Harvilla was equally critical saying, "Busy Tonight is tough sledding unless you're a superfan of Philipps, social-media geniuses, or the adorable baby-deer stumbles of new talk shows."
