= Tia Nolan =

American film editor

Tia Nolan is an American film editor.

== Early life and education ==
Nolan grew up in Chicago, and would develop an interest in filmmaking through her father's work, an advertiser who would collaborate with filmmakers like John Hughes and Allen Daviau. She went to study at USC School of Cinematic Arts, graduating in 1991.

== Career ==
Nolan would be mentored in film editing by Richard Marks, serving as his co-editor on the films I'll Do Anything (1994), You've Got Mail (1998) and Spanglish (2004).

For her contributions to the editing of the 74th Academy Awards, Nolan received a nomination for the Primetime Emmy Award for Outstanding Picture Editing for Variety Programming. Nolan's editing work with Bob Murawski on Doctor Strange in the Multiverse of Madness (2022) would earn positive remarks from Chicago Tribune film critic Michael Phillips.

== Filmography ==
=== Film ===
Year	Title	Director	Notes
2002	A Gentleman's Game	J. Mills Goodloe	
2004	Spanglish	James L. Brooks	
2005	Bewitched	Nora Ephron	
2008	The Women	Diane English	
2011	Friends with Benefits	Will Gluck	
2012	Struck by Lightning	Brian Dannelly	
2014	Date and Switch	Chris Nelson	Co-edited with Akiko Iwakawa-Grieve
2014	Annie	Will Gluck	
2016	How to Be Single	Christian Ditter	
2017	Little Evil	Eli Craig	
2018	Midnight Sun	Scott Speer	Co-edited with Michelle Harrison
2018	I Feel Pretty	Abby Kohn; Marc Silverstein	
2020	Superintelligence	Ben Falcone	
2021	Thunder Force	Ben Falcone	
2022	Doctor Strange in the Multiverse of Madness	Sam Raimi	Co-edited with Bob Murawski
2023	Anyone but You	Will Gluck	Co-edited with Kim Boritz-Brehm
2024	Harold and the Purple Crayon	Carlos Saldanha	Co-edited with Mark Helfrich
2025	One of Them Days	Lawrence Lamont	
2026	One Night Only	Will Gluck	
2026	The Love Hypothesis	Claire Scanlon	

Editorial department

Year	Film	Director	Role
1991	Delusion	Carl Colpaert	Apprentice editor
1992	Kuffs	Bruce A. Evans	Second assistant editor
1994	I'll Do Anything	James L. Brooks	Assistant editor
1994	I Love Trouble	Charles Shyer	Post-production coordinator
1995	Things to Do in Denver When You're Dead	Gary Fleder	Second assistant editor
1995	Assassins	Richard Donner	First assistant editor
1996	Extreme Measures	Michael Apted	First assistant editor
1998	You've Got Mail	Nora Ephron	Associate editor
2000	What Planet Are You From?	Mike Nichols	Associate editor
2001	The Affair of the Necklace	Charles Shyer	Additional film editor
2019	Avengers: Endgame	Russo brothers	Additional editor

Thanks

Year	Film	Director	Role
2011	Arthur Christmas	Sarah Smith	Special thanks

=== Television ===
Year	Title	Notes
2002	74th Academy Awards	—N/a
2012−13	Ben and Kate	4 episodes
2013	The Michael J. Fox Show	2 episodes
2014−15	The McCarthys	1 episode
2015	Zombie Basement	1 episode
2015	Weird Loners	3 episodes
2016	Angie Tribeca	8 episodes
2017	Longmire	1 episode
2019	Dollface	4 episodes
