= The Vow (2012 film) =

2012 film by Michael Sucsy

- Theatrical release poster
- Directed by: Michael Sucsy
- Screenplay by: Abby Kohn; Marc Silverstein; Jason Katims
- Story by: Stuart Sender
- Produced by: Roger Birnbaum; Gary Barber; Jonathan Glickman; Paul Taublieb
- Starring: Rachel McAdams; Channing Tatum; Sam Neill; Scott Speedman; Jessica Lange
- Cinematography: Rogier Stoffers
- Edited by: Melissa Kent; Nancy Richardson
- Music by: Michael Brook; Rachel Portman
- Production companies: Spyglass Entertainment; Birnbaum/Barber Productions
- Distributed by: Screen Gems
- Release dates: February 6, 2012 (Los Angeles); February 10, 2012 (United States)
- Running time: 104 minutes
- Country: United States
- Language: English
- Budget: $30 million
- Box office: $196.1 million

The Vow is a 2012 American romantic drama film directed by Michael Sucsy and starring Rachel McAdams and Channing Tatum. Written by Abby Kohn, Marc Silverstein, and Jason Katims, the film was inspired by the true story of Kim and Krickitt Carpenter. In addition to McAdams and Tatum as Paige and Leo Collins, the cast includes Sam Neill, Scott Speedman, Jessica Lange and Jessica McNamee in supporting roles. As of 2013, The Vow was the eighth highest-grossing romantic drama film produced since 1980. This was Spyglass Entertainment's last film before the company's closure in 2012 and its revival in 2019.

== Plot ==
Paige Collins and her husband Leo come out of a movie theater on a snowy evening. On their way home, at a stop sign, Paige unbuckles her seatbelt to lean over and kiss Leo. At that very moment, a salt truck rams their car from behind and Paige flies through the windshield. Both of them are rushed to a hospital.

As Leo, in a voice-over, talks about how "moments of impact help in finding who we are," his relationship with Paige is explored – their courtship, engagement, and wedding at the Art Institute of Chicago, all interwoven with the present. Paige is put into an induced coma and later regains consciousness to discover she has lost all of her memories. Paige's parents, Bill and Rita Thornton, learn about this and visit her, meeting Leo for the first time.

Paige does not understand how Leo could be married to her yet not have met her own parents. She finds it even stranger that he does not know either. Nor does Paige understand why she left law school, broke off an engagement with her previous fiancé, Jeremy, and lost contact with her family and friends. Needing evidence of her relationship with Leo, he plays her a voice message as proof. Paige is against the idea of moving back in with her parents, so decides to return to Leo, hoping it will help her regain her lost memories. She is welcomed home with a surprise party thrown by her friends, none of whom she can recall, so she feels overwhelmed.

The next day, Paige ventures out to a café she regularly visited, but loses her way back. Paige calls her mother for help and returns to Leo. That evening, her parents, Bill and Rita, invite the couple to dinner; later, Paige's sister Gwen and her fiancé invite them out to a bar. Leo comes to feel that he doesn't fit in with Paige's family. Paige later meets Jeremy again at the bar. Realizing that she is becoming infatuated with Jeremy, Leo persists in trying to help her regain her memory. Paige secretly meets Jeremy at his office and asks him about their broken engagement. His answer is ambiguous; he is still clearly attracted to her. While Leo gives Paige a tour of her own studio, she suddenly lashes out at him. With Gwen's wedding approaching, Paige decides to stay with her parents. Leo asks Paige out on a date and spends the night with her, but the relationship is further strained when Bill attempts to persuade him to divorce her. When Jeremy begins taunting Leo, he eventually loses his temper and punches Jeremy. Paige rejoins law school and a heartbroken Leo reaches an epiphany that her memory may never return.

At a Trader Joe's, Paige meets Diane, an old friend who is unaware of Paige's amnesia. It's revealed that Diane had an affair with Bill, thus explaining why Paige has been estranged from her family. When Paige angrily confronts Rita about this, she tells Paige that she decided to stay with her father for everything he had done right instead of leaving him for one transgression. Reuniting with Leo, Paige learns that, although he knew of the affair being her reason for going no contact, he wanted to earn her love instead of driving her away from her family. While in class, Paige starts to take up sketching. Despite Bill's misgivings about quitting law school, Paige reassures him that she will always be his daughter no matter what. Paige continues her interest in art, eventually returning to sculpting and drawing. Jeremy confesses he broke up with his girlfriend in hopes of winning Paige back, but she turns him down, stating that she needs to know what life would be like without him.

As the seasons change, Leo again reflects on "moments of impact," whose potential for change has ripple effects far beyond what can be predicted. Back in her room, Paige finds a menu card on which she had written her wedding vows. She later meets Leo at the cafe and, despite admitting the end of their relationship, they agree to have dinner together and walk off arm in arm.

== Cast ==
- Rachel McAdams as Paige Collins
- Channing Tatum as Leo Collins, Paige's husband
- Sam Neill as Bill Thornton, Paige's father
- Jessica Lange as Rita Thornton, Paige's mother
- Jessica McNamee as Gwen Thornton, Paige's sister
- Wendy Crewson as Dr. Fishman
- Tatiana Maslany as Lily
- Lucas Bryant as Kyle
- Scott Speedman as Jeremy
- Joey Klein as Josh
- Joe Cobden as Jim
- Jeananne Goossen as Sonia
- Dillon Casey as Ryan
- Shannon Barnett as Carrie
- Lindsay Ames as Shana
- Kristina Pešić as Lizbet
- Britt Irvin as Lina
- Sarah Carter as Diane
- Rachel Skarsten as Rose

== Production ==
Rachel McAdams and Channing Tatum's casting was announced by Variety in June 2010. Filming took place from August until November 2010 in Toronto and Chicago.

=== Background ===
The Vow is loosely based on the actual relationship of Kim and Krickitt Carpenter, who wrote a book about their marriage, also titled The Vow. Ten weeks after their wedding on September 18, 1993, the couple was involved in a serious car crash. Krickitt suffered a traumatic brain injury, which erased all memories of her romance with Kim as well as their marriage. Kim was still deeply in love with his wife, although she viewed him as a stranger after the crash. In 2018, however, he admitted to having an affair and they divorced.

The film was developed as early as 1996, when Caravan Pictures bought the rights to the memoir, then the entire development slate was transferred to Spyglass Entertainment when the company first set up. Stephen Herek was attached to direct at first. The film first landed Disney as distributor, then it was sold to Paramount Pictures in turnaround before landing at Sony.

=== Music ===
The Vow: Music from the Motion Picture

Soundtrack album by Various Artists
- Released: February 7, 2012
- Recorded: 2011
- Label: Rhino Records

The soundtrack was released on February 7, 2012, by Rhino Records. The film score, written and composed by Rachel Portman and Michael Brook, was released digitally on a separate album on February 7, 2012, through Madison Gate Records.

==== Track listing ====
No.	Title	Performer(s)	Length
1.	"I'd Do Anything for Love (But I Won't Do That)"	Meat Loaf	5:22
2.	"Specks"	Matt Pond PA	3:49
3.	"Leaving on the 5th"	Voxhaul Broadcast	3:41
4.	"This Too Shall Pass"	OK Go	3:08
5.	"Get Some"	Lykke Li	3:22
6.	"Nothing Was Stolen (Love Me Foolishly)"	Phosphorescent	4:49
7.	"Come On, Come On" (Dean & Britta Remix)	Scott Hardkiss feat. Britta Phillips & Dean Wareham	7:35
8.	"Play My Way"	Maya von Doll	3:21
9.	"Problems of Our Own"	Light FM	3:12
10.	"Neon Blue"	Still Life Still	3:20
11.	"Pictures of You"	The Cure	7:28

The digital version of the soundtrack also contains "England" by The National.

== Release ==
=== Critical response ===
Review aggregation website Rotten Tomatoes gives the film an approval rating of 30% based on 132 reviews and an average rating of 4.95/10. The site's consensus reads, "Channing Tatum and Rachel McAdams do their best with what they're given, but The Vow is too shallow and familiar to satisfy the discriminating date-night filmgoer." On Metacritic, which assigns a weighted mean rating to reviews, the film received an average score of 43 out of 100 based on 28 critics, which indicates "mixed or average reviews."

Emma Dibdin from Total Film gave the film a three-star rating out of five, commenting, "There's an essential sweetness at work here, thanks partly to McAdams and partly to an unusually chaste love story that ultimately keeps melodrama at bay." Empire critic Helen O'Hara gave the film a three stars rating out of five, also. She found McAdams "excellent" and Tatum "surprisingly heartbreaking" and concluded, "The few weaknesses in the plot can be overlooked as The Vow makes for a wonderful – if a bit teary – romance that is brilliantly acted." The Washington Post's Stephanie Merry wrote, "It's a shame things are so black and white because the movie has more promise – and more laughs – than trailers suggest." She added "Tatum, while a bit deficient in the dramatic acting department, delivers some memorable quips. He and McAdams also have chemistry."

Giving the film 2.5 stars out of 4, Roger Ebert of the Chicago Sun-Times found it "pleasant enough as a date movie, but that's all." USA Today wrote, "It may appeal to the most rabid fans of tearjerk romances like The Notebook, but it's a hard-to-swallow, maudlin tale." Betsy Sharkey, a film critic from the Los Angeles Times wrote, "Despite the sweet story, this is a movie that leaves you wanting more. To care more, to cry more, to love more." ReelViews' James Berardinelli was very negative about the film. He wrote, "With its would-be crowd-pleasing contrivances and rote adherence to formula, [this film] offers almost no redeeming characteristics. [...] This is for young women what Transformers is for young men." He concluded by describing the film as a "heartless, soulless product."

=== Box office ===
The Vow debuted at #1 in its opening weekend, with $15.4 million on opening day and $41.2 million over the weekend. On the Valentine's Day, it grossed $11.6 million, breaking Hitch's record $7.5 million for the highest-grossing mid-week Valentine's Day. That record would be surpassed by Bob Marley: One Love in 2024 with $14 million. The film also earned around $9.7 million internationally that weekend.

On the weekend lasting from February 24–26, The Vow became the first film of 2012 in North America to cross the $100 million mark, and the third film to cross the $100 million mark worldwide behind Underworld: Awakening and Journey 2: The Mysterious Island. The film grossed $125 million in North America and $71.1 million in other countries for a worldwide total of $196.1 million. It is the eighth highest-grossing romantic drama film since 1980.

=== Accolades ===
List of awards and nominations
Award	Category	Recipient(s)	Result
BMI Film & TV Awards	Film Music Award	Rachel Portman	Won
Golden Trailer Awards	Best Romance		Nominated
Golden Trailer Awards	Best Romance TV Spot	"Forever"	Won
MTV Movie Awards	Best Male Performance	Channing Tatum	Nominated
MTV Movie Awards	Best Kiss	Rachel McAdams and Channing Tatum	Nominated
Teen Choice Awards	Choice Movie: Drama		Nominated
Teen Choice Awards	Choice Movie: Romance		Nominated
Teen Choice Awards	Choice Movie Actor: Drama	Channing Tatum	Nominated
Teen Choice Awards	Choice Movie Actress: Drama	Rachel McAdams	Nominated
People's Choice Awards	Favorite Dramatic Movie		Nominated
People's Choice Awards	Favorite Movie Actor	Channing Tatum (also for Magic Mike and 21 Jump Street)	Nominated
People's Choice Awards	Favorite Dramatic Movie Actor	Channing Tatum (also for Magic Mike)	Nominated
People's Choice Awards	Favorite Dramatic Movie Actress	Rachel McAdams	Nominated

=== Home media ===
The film's DVD and Blu-ray Disc were released on May 8, 2012 by Sony Pictures Home Entertainment.

== See also ==
- Mithya (2008)
- Memento (2000)
- Regarding Henry (1991)
