= Voxhaul Broadcast =

- Origin: Los Angeles
- Genres: Indie rock, alternative rock
- Years active: 2006–2012
- Members: David Denis; Anthony Aguiar; Phillip Munsey II; Kurt Allen

Voxhaul Broadcast was a Silver Lake, Los Angeles–based indie rock band formed in 2006. The band was composed of four childhood friends: David Denis (lead vocals and guitars), Anthony Aguiar (guitars and keyboards), Phil Munsey II (bass guitar), and Kurt Allen (drums). The band broke up in 2012.

== History ==
=== Formation (2006–2007) ===
At the age of 13, David's family moved to San Clemente, CA, where he met bass player Phil Munsey II.

Drummer Kurt Allen and Anthony Aguiar grew up on the same street in San Clemente, CA. Denis met Allen while attending Shorecliff Middle School in San Clemente. Through middle and high school, all 4 band members were in and out of bands. During high school Aguiar and Allen started a band with Matt Vazquez of Delta Spirit. Post high school graduation, Allen moved to San Francisco to attend San Francisco State University.

=== Rotten Apples EP (2007–2009) ===
Voxhaul Broadcast's debut 8 song EP, Rotten Apples, was recorded and mixed in one day in February 2007.

Following the release, the band embarked on their first US tour, co-headlining with Local Natives. They played at Sundance Film Festival, Summerfest in Milwaukee, CMJ Music Marathon and SXSW.

=== Fact, Fiction and Turquoise EP (2009–2011) ===
The 5 song EP Fact, Fiction and Turquoise was recorded at Elliott Smith's studio "New Monkey" in Van Nuys, CA. NME Radio playlisted the track "Fact Or Fiction." The band were guest performers on KCRW's show Morning Becomes Eclectic. The band also performed for Daytrotter and the Silver Lake Jubilee.

=== Timing Is Everything (2011–2012) ===
The 11 song album Timing Is Everything is a mix of recordings from the Rotten Apples EP and new recordings produced and mixed by Tom Biller. The band toured the entire US in the spring of 2011.

== Appearances ==
- "You are the Wilderness" is featured in the third season episode "Prey" and The Walking Dead: Original Soundtrack – Vol. 1
- "Leaving on the 5th" was featured in The Vow Original Motion Picture Soundtrack.
- "If I Run" was featured in The Lucky One Original Motion Picture Soundtrack.
- "Rotten Apples" was featured in the series finale episode from the show Ugly Betty (season 4 episode 20 – Hello Goodbye (Ugly Betty)) and in the series episode from the show Friday Night Lights (TV series) (season 2 episode 14 – Leave No One Behind – Friday Night Lights (season 2)).
- "Fact, Fiction" was featured in the 2018 romantic drama Only You.
