= Carrie Donovan =

American fashion editor

- Born: Carolyn Gertrude Amelia Donovan; March 22, 1928; Lake Placid, New York, US
- Died: November 12, 2001 (aged 73); New York City, US
- Occupation: style editor for Vogue, Harper's Bazaar, and the New York Times Magazine

Carrie Donovan (March 22, 1928 – November 12, 2001) was an American fashion editor for Vogue, Harper's Bazaar and The New York Times Magazine. In the 1990s she became known for her work in Old Navy commercials where she wore her trademark large eyeglasses and black clothing, often declaring the merchandise "Fabulous!". In almost all of the commercials, she appeared alongside Magic the dog and various other stars from TV and fashion. She was often mistaken for Natalie Schafer (Mrs. Howell from Gilligan's Island) in the commercials because of the presence of multiple sitcom characters from the 1970s.

She was parodied by Ana Gasteyer on an episode of Saturday Night Live.

== Early life ==
Carolyn Gertrude Amelia Donovan was born in Lake Placid, New York. Carrie and her sister, Jane, lived primarily with their grandparents until 1942 when they then went to live with their mother. Donovan did not have a relationship with her father who left early on in her life. When Donovan was just 10 years old, she mailed her own sketches for a design collection to the actress Jane Wyman, who replied with a handwritten letter. She later attended the Parsons School of Design, graduating in 1950. Donovan never learned how to sew, so she had bribed her classmates to sew her test pieces for school. She worked as a journalist for 30 years; she always wrote her copy out by hand, because she never learned how to use a typewriter.

== Career ==
Donovan's first job was at Saks Fifth Avenue, where she worked under Tatiana Liberman, who was married to Alexander Liberman, the editor of Vogue. Donovan was recruited by The New York Times Magazine in 1955 after she graduated from Parsons School of Design. A few years later Donovan was recruited by Diana Vreeland of Vogue.

Donovan gained recognition as a style editor for Vogue, Harper's Bazaar, and the New York Times Magazine. Donovan later joined Harper's Bazaar and was senior editor from 1972 to 1977 before she went back to The New York Times Magazine. She was known for being able to quickly recognize talent, being among the first to praise the work of designers Donna Karan and Perry Ellis. It was her work for Old Navy, however, that brought her into the public eye.
