= Still Life Still =

Still Life Still is a Canadian indie rock group from East York in Toronto, Ontario, Canada. The band formed in 1999. It's line-up has undergone minor changes, but the core consists of guitarists/vocalists Brendon Saarinen and Eric Young, bassist Derek Paulin, drummer Aaron Romaniuk, and his brother, keyboardist/percussionist Josh Romaniuk.

== History ==
The band was formed by a group of friends who grew up together in the Woodbine-Lumsden neighbourhood of East York while its original four members (Romaniuk, Young, Paulin and Saarinen) were in elementary school. The group originally played under the names Unreal and El Mo before settling on Still Life Still.

After many local gigs, they were discovered by fledgling indie DIY label and studio Mushroom Productions, who heard (via MySpace) and saw their early potential at an NXNE fest in 2005. The label met them at that gig and invited them to record and develop. A week later they were in the studio, recording many of their pivotal early songs.

Mushroom released two albums of early live recordings, and two demo ep's that were released in 2006 and 2007, by Mushroom (although physical copies are rare), featuring Alanna J Brown, who grew up with the band. Soon after, the band was on the radar of the TO scene in a big way, playing NXNE 2007 with two critics' picks.

While recording at Mushroom north of the city, both parties connected with William New of the Drake Underground, who gave them a connection that attracted many fans.

A short time later, Kevin Drew was at a show at the Cameron House to see the band, and they soon signed to Arts & Crafts. In 2009 they were headliners for NOW Magazine's NXNE issue after signing with their dream label. They began recording with Broken Social Scene's Kevin Drew and Martin Davis Kinack in 2008.

Their first commercial EP, Pastel, was released in June, 2009. Soon after, the band's first full-length album, Girls Come Too, was released in August. All the songs were performed and written by the band members. The lyrics contain explicit sexual references.

The band toured North America with The Most Serene Republic and The Hold Steady to promote Girls Come Too and appeared on MTV Canada's MTV Live in the summer of 2009.

In early 2012 their song "Neon Blue" from Girls Come Too was featured in the romantic drama The Vow, which was filmed primarily in the band's hometown of Toronto.

Still Life Still worked on their second full-length studio album, Mourning Trance. The first song from the album, "Burial Suit", was released online by Rolling Stone Magazine on April 25, 2013, followed by the first official single from the album, "In Enemies", on June 3, 2013. Mourning Trance was released on August 20, 2013. They are listed by their label as "non-active".

== Discography ==
1. Live at Mushroom 2006 - 15 tracks
2. Mushroom Demo One 2006 - 4 tracks
3. Mushroom Demo Two 2007 - 3 tracks (+ 3 bonus tracks)
4. High Score live recording 2007 - 20 tracks

=== Albums ===
- Girls Come Too (2009)

Track listing:

1. "Danse Cave" - 3:41
2. "Flowers and a Wreath" - 3:34
3. "Kid" - 3:23
4. "Lite Bright Lawns" - 1:23
5. "Neon Blue" - 3:20
6. "Pastel" - 3:32
7. "Planets" - 3:57
8. "Knives in Cartoons" - 3:15
9. "T-Shirts" - 2:01
10. "Scissors Losing Weight" - 3:19
11. "Wild Bees" - 12:06
- Mourning Trance (2013)

=== EPs ===
- Pastel (2009)
