= The Walking Dead: Original Soundtrack – Vol. 1 =

Soundtrack album by Various Artists
- Released: March 17, 2013
- Genre: Film soundtrack
- Length: 28:57
- Label: Universal Republic

The Walking Dead: Original Soundtrack – Vol. 1 is a soundtrack album featuring tracks from and inspired by AMC's television series The Walking Dead released March 17, 2013, by Universal Republic Records.

Prior to the album's release, some of the tracks were released as digital singles starting with "The Parting Glass" by series stars Emily Kinney and Lauren Cohan in October 2012. The album peaked at number 54 on the Billboard 200 chart for the week of April 6.

== Critical reception ==
Professional ratings
Review scores
Source	Rating
AllMusic	3/5 stars
Artistdirect	5/5 stars

Rick Florino of Artistdirect cited the album as the "best soundtrack of the year" and said it was "everything it should be and so much more" while Heather Phares of AllMusic was displeased with the lack of tracks composed by Bear McCreary that appear in the series, saying it "should please fans who enjoy the show's overall mood" but that "it doesn't capture its essence the way a soundtrack with more of McCreary's score would have."

== Track listing ==
No.	Title	Writer(s)	Artist	Length
1.	"Lead Me Home"	Jamie N Commons	Jamie N Commons	1:57
2.	"Main Title Theme" (Unkle Remix)	Steven L. Kaplan, Bear McCreary	Bear McCreary	4:23
3.	"You Are the Wilderness"	Anthony Aguiar, Kurt Allen, David Dennis, Phillip Munsey	Voxhaul Broadcast	5:16
4.	"Love Bug"	David Stark, Joe Stark, Butch Walker	Baby Bee	2:52
5.	"Warm Shadow" (Dactyl Remix)	Fin Greenall, Tim Thornton, Guy Whittaker	Fink	5:33
6.	"Sinking Man"	Nanna Bryndís Hilmarsdóttir, Ragnar Þórhallsson	Of Monsters and Men	2:46
7.	"The Parting Glass"	Traditional	Emily Kinney, Lauren Cohan	2:57
8.	"Running"	Jon Jameson, William McLaren, Matthew Vasquez, Kelly Winrich, Brandon Young	Delta Spirit	3:12

Notes

- Track 1 ("Lead Me Home") is featured in the third season episode "Clear" and in the midseason 3 trailer.
- Track 3 ("You Are the Wilderness") is featured in the third season episode "Prey".
- Track 4 ("Love Bug") is featured in the third season episode "Say the Word".
- Track 5 ("Warm Shadow") is featured in the third season episode "Arrow on the Doorpost".
- Track 7 ("The Parting Glass") is featured in the third season episode "Seed".

Credits adapted from AllMusic.

== Release history ==
Region	Date	Format
United States	March 17, 2013	Digital download
United States	March 19, 2013	CD

== Charts ==
Chart (2013)	Peak position
Billboard 200	54
