= How to Be Single =

2016 film by Christian Ditter

- Theatrical release poster
- Directed by: Christian Ditter
- Screenplay by: Abby Kohn; Marc Silverstein; Dana Fox
- Story by: Abby Kohn; Marc Silverstein
- Based on: How to Be Single by Liz Tuccillo
- Produced by: John Rickard; Dana Fox
- Starring: Dakota Johnson; Rebel Wilson; Damon Wayans Jr.; Anders Holm; Alison Brie; Nicholas Braun; Jake Lacy; Jason Mantzoukas; Leslie Mann
- Cinematography: Christian Rein
- Edited by: Tia Nolan
- Music by: Fil Eisler
- Production companies: New Line Cinema; Metro-Goldwyn-Mayer Pictures; RatPac-Dune Entertainment; Flower Films; Wrigley Pictures
- Distributed by: Warner Bros. Pictures
- Release dates: February 9, 2016 (London); February 12, 2016 (United States)
- Running time: 110 minutes
- Country: United States
- Language: English
- Budget: $38 million
- Box office: $112.3 million

How to Be Single is a 2016 American romantic comedy film directed by Christian Ditter and written by Abby Kohn, Marc Silverstein and Dana Fox, based on the novel of the same name by Liz Tuccillo. It stars Dakota Johnson, Rebel Wilson, Damon Wayans Jr., Anders Holm, Alison Brie, Nicholas Braun, Jake Lacy, Jason Mantzoukas, and Leslie Mann, and follows a group of women in New York City who have different approaches on how to be single.

The film was theatrically released in the United States on February 12, 2016, by Warner Bros. Pictures. It grossed $112 million worldwide and received mixed reviews from critics.

== Plot ==
Alice temporarily dumps her college boyfriend Josh. She then moves to New York City to be a paralegal and live with her sister, Meg, an OB/GYN who has no interest in having a baby of her own or being in a relationship. Alice befriends wild Australian co-worker Robin, who enjoys partying and one-night stands, and local bartender Tom, who embraces the bachelor lifestyle and hooks up with several women, including Alice. Tom meets Lucy at his bar when she uses his Internet for free; she explains she is looking for "the one" using various dating sites.

Alice meets with Josh, ready to reconcile. He explains he is seeing someone else, which distresses her. Meg has a change of heart while watching over a baby, deciding to have a child of her own via a sperm donor.

Shortly after she becomes pregnant, Meg unexpectedly hooks up with a younger man, Ken, after meeting him at Alice's office Christmas party. He, the law office receptionist, is smitten with her. She tries to break it off, but he continues to pursue her. Thinking Ken is too young for her to have a future with, Meg hides the pregnancy from him.

Back at Tom's bar, Lucy has a string of horrible dates, at which point he realizes he has feelings for her. In an attempt to put herself out there, Alice attends a networking event, where she hits it off with a man named David.

Lucy has been in a relationship for three weeks with Paul, who reveals he has been seeing other people, thinking she was doing the same, and breaks up with her. Lucy breaks down at her volunteer job reading to children at a bookstore. George, who works there, soothes her, and they begin a relationship.

Alice and Robin attend Josh's holiday party; Alice finds she cannot watch Josh with his new girlfriend. She runs into David, who shows her a private view of the Rockefeller Center Christmas Tree, dazzling her, and they begin a relationship. Three months later, as she is singing with David's daughter Phoebe, he becomes upset with her, reminding her that she is not Phoebe's mother. His wife died two years earlier and David believes it is too soon for Phoebe to have a stepmother. They break up as a result.

Tom becomes upset with Lucy's relationship with George and invites Alice to get drunk. They talk about their frustrations with their feelings for Josh and Lucy and sleep together to distract themselves. Ken discovers Meg is pregnant but is eager to help raise her child. She, fearing that he is not truly committed, ends the relationship.

At Alice's birthday party, Robin invites Tom, David, and Josh without Alice's knowledge, as she thought it would be funny. Shaken by the presence of all three men, Alice confronts Robin. Tom confesses his feelings to Lucy, but she announces she is engaged to George. Josh approaches Alice, and they make out but stop when she discovers he is now engaged and is merely looking for closure with her.

Invigorated by a desire to find herself, Alice leaves to go home, but is stopped by Robin, who jumps over her cab. When Meg starts going into labor, the three manage to get another cab and rush to the hospital. Meg gives birth to a baby girl and Ken convinces her to resume their relationship, while Alice rekindles her friendship with Robin.

Alice reflects on her time living alone and being single. Meg and Ken are together, while Robin continues her old habits. Tom opens up to the possibilities of non-casual relationships. Lucy marries George, and David talks to his daughter about her mother. Alice explores the Grand Canyon by herself to witness the sunrise on New Year's Day: a dream she had always had.

== Cast ==
- Dakota Johnson as Alice Kepley, Meg's sister and Robin's friend and co-worker
- Rebel Wilson as Robin, Alice's friend and co-worker
- Leslie Mann as Meg Kepley, Alice's sister
- Alison Brie as Lucy, she has online dating down to a science hoping to find her soulmate
- Anders Holm as Tom, a bartender
- Nicholas Braun as Josh, Alice's ex-boyfriend
- Damon Wayans Jr. as David Stone, Alice's love interest
- Jake Lacy as Ken, Meg's love interest
- Jason Mantzoukas as George, an employee at the bookstore where Lucy volunteers to read to children
- Colin Jost as Paul
- Brent Morin as Lucy's date

== Production ==
=== Development and casting ===
The film rights for the Liz Tuccillo novel were purchased in 2008, the same year as the book's publication. Drew Barrymore was initially attached to direct; however, she was replaced in 2013 with Christian Ditter.

Lily Collins was in early talks on February 24, 2014, to join the cast of the film. Alison Brie was in talks to join the film on June 19, 2014. Dakota Johnson, Rebel Wilson, and Leslie Mann were all cast in the film on January 29, 2015. Damon Wayans Jr. was added to the cast on March 6, 2015. Jason Mantzoukas and Nicholas Braun were also cast, on April 14, 2015; Braun played the love interest of Johnson's character, while Mantzoukas played the love interest of Brie's. Anders Holm was cast as Tom, and Saturday Night Live performer Colin Jost was also cast in a supporting role. Dan Stevens was also cast, but dropped out due to scheduling conflicts in favour of Beauty and The Beast.

=== Filming ===
Principal photography began on April 20, 2015, in New York City, and ended on June 25, 2015.

== Reception ==
=== Box office ===
How to Be Single grossed $46.8 million in the United States and Canada and $65.5 million in other territories for a worldwide total of $112.3 million, against a production budget of $38 million.

In the United States and Canada, the film opened alongside Deadpool and Zoolander 2 and over its four-day President's Day opening weekend was projected to gross $20–25 million from 3,343 theaters. The film made $700,000 from its Thursday night previews and $5.3 million on its first day. It went on to gross $17.9 million in its opening weekend, finishing third at the box office behind Deadpool ($132.8 million) and Kung Fu Panda 3 ($19.8 million). In its second weekend the film grossed $8.2 million (a 54% drop), finishing fifth.

=== Critical response ===
On Rotten Tomatoes the film holds an approval rating of 45% based on 155 reviews, with an average rating of 5.2/10. The site's critical consensus reads, "How to Be Single boasts the rough outline of a feminist rom-com, but too willingly indulges in the genre conventions it wants to subvert." On Metacritic, the film has a weighted average score of 51 out of 100 based on 32 critics, indicating "mixed or average" reviews. Audiences polled by CinemaScore gave the film an average grade of "B" on an A+ to F scale.

Richard Roeper of the Chicago Sun-Times gave the film three-and-a-half out of four stars, praising the film's supporting cast and script. Alonso Duralde of the TheWrap wrote:

The script offers enough laughs to keep the movie from feeling completely disposable... and it outshines many of its genre peers through little touches like not punishing its female characters for enjoying sex and casting Damon Wayans Jr. (as a romantic interest for Alice) in a role in which his race is thoroughly irrelevant.

The Guardian's Peter Bradshaw gave it 1/5 stars, writing, "Wilson has one or two good lines, but this film looks like it’s been put together by one of Brie's dodgy algorithms." Linda Barnard of the Toronto Star gave it 1.5/4 stars, writing, "Unsure what kind of movie it wants to be, How To Be Single is a messy mix of everything, burying the final, genuinely felt 20 minutes that could have saved this intermittently amusing, sloppily made rom-com."

=== Accolades ===
People's Choice Awards nominated How to Be Single as Favorite Comedic Movie, but it lost to Bad Moms.
