= Busy Philipps =

American actress (born 1979)

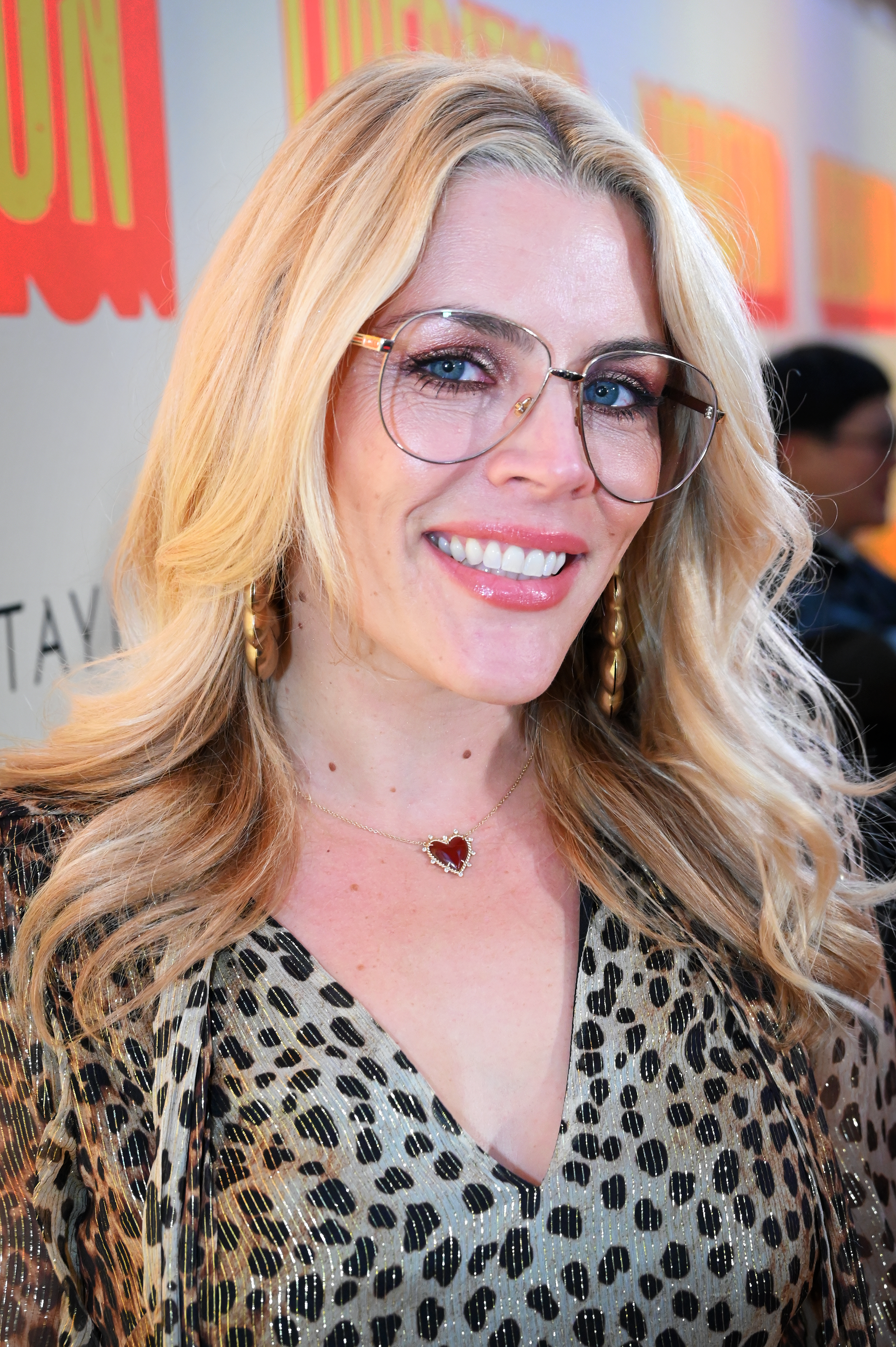
- Philipps in 2025
- Born: Elizabeth Jean Philipps; June 25, 1979 (age 47); Oak Park, Illinois, U.S.
- Occupation: Actress
- Years active: 1999–present
- Spouse: Marc Silverstein (m. 2007; sep. 2021)
- Children: 2

Elizabeth Jean "Busy" Philipps (born June 25, 1979) is an American actress. She is best known for her roles on the television series Freaks and Geeks (1999–2000), Dawson's Creek (2001–2003), and ER (2006–2007), and for her portrayal of Laurie Keller on the ABC/TBS television sitcom Cougar Town (2009–2015), for which she received the Critics' Choice Television Award for Best Supporting Actress in a Comedy Series.

Phillips has also appeared in supporting roles in films, including The Smokers (2000), Home Room (2002), White Chicks (2004), Made of Honor (2008), He's Just Not That Into You (2009), The Gift (2015), and I Feel Pretty (2018). From 2018 to 2019, Philipps hosted her own television talk show Busy Tonight, on E!. From 2021 to 2024, she starred on the Peacock / Netflix original series Girls5eva.

== Early life ==
Philipps was born in Oak Park, Illinois, a suburb of Chicago. She received the nickname "Busy" as a child; sources conflict on whether the nickname came from her parents or a babysitter named Susie. She said on her late-night talk show, Busy Tonight, that her mother gave her the nickname, but during her book tour said that her babysitter had given it to her. This was clarified on an episode of Comedy Bang! Bang! when she confirmed to host Scott Aukerman that it was her babysitter. Philipps was raised in Scottsdale, Arizona, where she graduated from Chaparral High School.

Philipps attended Loyola Marymount University at the same time as Colin Hanks and Freaks and Geeks costar Linda Cardellini. She then dated Hanks for several years, after they left school. Philipps did not complete her degree program.

== Career ==
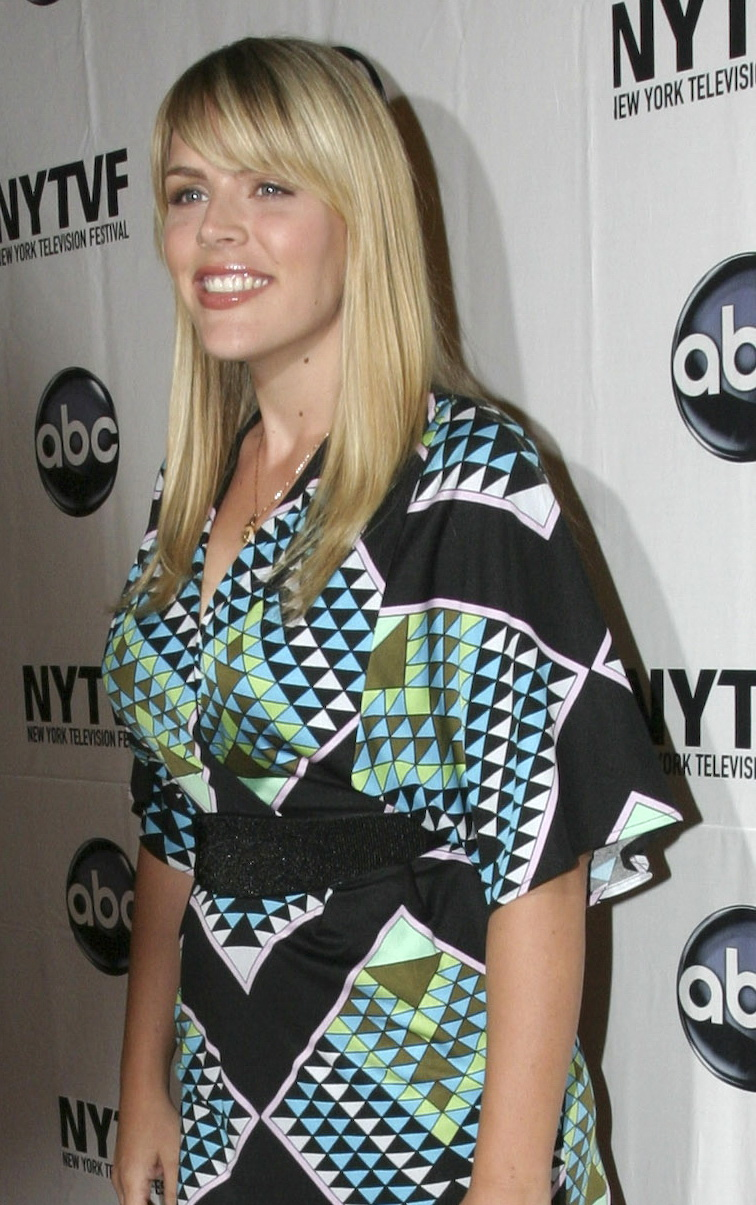
Philipps in 2009

While still in high school, Philipps worked at toy trade fairs as a real-life Barbie, her sister Cool Teen Skipper. Among the people who saw her at toy conventions was actress Sharon Stone, who was impressed with her performance and told Philipps that she would be a star.

Her first major role was Kim Kelly in the 1999–2000 comedy-drama TV series Freaks and Geeks; Philipps appeared in all but one of the show's 18 episodes (the episode "Chokin' & Tokin'"). She made her film debut in the comedy The Smokers in 2000, and had various small appearances on television.

In 2001, Philipps was cast as Audrey Liddell in the teen drama Dawson's Creek.

Philipps appeared in several films, including Home Room (2002) and White Chicks (2004). She was cast in the UPN sitcom Love, Inc. in a role originally intended for Shannen Doherty. The show lasted one season (2005–2006). In 2006, she had a major recurring role as Hope Bobeck on ER, alongside her Freaks and Geeks co-star Linda Cardellini. During her second year on ER, her character was written out as heading to South America to "fulfill her Christian mission".

Philipps had a co-credit for the storyline of the 2007 comedy film Blades of Glory. A year later, she appeared in a supporting role in Made of Honor.

She made appearances in He's Just Not That into You as Kelli Ann and on an episode of How I Met Your Mother.

In 2008 to 2009 she was a recurring character on Terminator: The Sarah Connor Chronicles, appearing in five episodes as Kacy Corbin. From 2009 to 2015, Philipps portrayed Laurie Keller in the television series Cougar Town. She routinely contributed to the Thrilling Adventure Hour, a live stage radio show. Her primary recurring character was the Red Plains Rider.

On a 2010 appearance on Chelsea Lately, Philipps said that she auditioned for the hit television show Glee just one week after giving birth, following a pregnancy during which she gained 80 pounds.

Philipps starred on the HBO series Vice Principals (2016–2017).

In 2017, she signed on as co-lead opposite Casey Wilson in Tina Fey's comedy pilot The Sackett Sisters for NBC, but it was not picked up.

In 2018 and 2019, Philipps played Sheba Goodman in season 4 of Netflix's Unbreakable Kimmy Schmidt.

She had a late-night talk show called Busy Tonight, which aired on E! from October 28, 2018, to May 16, 2019. It was cancelled the same day Philipps was nominated for a 2019 Critics Choice Award. In August 2020 she began hosting a podcast, Busy Philipps is Doing Her Best, along with former Busy Tonight writers Caissie St. Onge and Shantira Jackson.

In October 2020, it was announced that she had joined the main cast of Peacock's Girls5eva, a musical comedy about a female pop group that reunites 20 years after it flamed out. In its third season the show, created by Meredith Scardino, shifted to Netflix.

In February 28, 2023, Philipps was announced as Mrs. George in the 2024 film adaptation of the musical Mean Girls, based on the 2018 Broadway musical.

In 2024, Phillips began hosting a talk/shopping show called Busy This Week on the QVC+/HSN+ streaming service.

=== Book ===
Philipps's memoir, This Will Only Hurt a Little, was released October 18, 2018. It includes a passage where she describes a physical altercation she had with James Franco on the set of Freaks and Geeks. She said she was "bummed" by the amount of attention drawn to just this incident in the book, saying the story was not new, and that she meant it "to illustrate a larger point about the way women are treated in this business and in life."

== Personal life ==
Philipps married screenwriter Marc Silverstein on June 16, 2007. Birdie Leigh, born in 2008 (an actress who has appeared in the Prime Video series With Love), and Cricket Pearl, born in 2013. They separated in February 2021.

Philipps has ADHD.

In August 2026, Philipps revealed that she was diagnosed with oligodendroglioma, a type of brain tumor, back in February. The following month in March, she had it successfully treated via surgery; however, she developed a staph infection a month later, which required additional surgery to treat. Philipps said she had postponed medical care; however, following the death of James Van Der Beek from colon cancer, it encouraged her to seek a diagnosis after experiencing frequent headaches.

=== Political views ===
After the Alabama Legislature's May 14, 2019, passage of House Bill 314 (also known as the "Human Life Protection Act"), Philipps advocated that women speak out if they had had abortions. On May 14, she invoked the hashtag #YouKnowMe (established on February 18) to her 370,000 followers on Twitter, with her call for testimonies: "1 in 4 women have had an abortion. Many people think they don't know someone who has, but #youknowme. So let's do this: if you are also the 1 in 4, let's share it and start to end the shame. Use #youknowme and share your truth." The previous week she revealed on her Busy Tonight TV show that she had had an abortion at age 15.

On June 4, 2019, Philipps gave a testimonial before the House Judiciary Committee defending women's right to access more abortion clinics. She spoke of her own experience with abortion: "I am a human being that deserves autonomy in this country that calls itself free, and choices that a human being makes about their own bodies should not be legislated by strangers who can't possibly know or understand each individual's circumstances or beliefs."

== Filmography ==
=== Film ===
Year	Title	Role	Notes
2000	The Smokers	Karen Carter	
2002	Home Room	Alicia Browning	
2004	Mummy an' the Armadillo	Carol Ann	
2004	White Chicks	Karen Googlestein	
2005	Stewie Griffin: The Untold Story	Additional Voices (voice)	
2008	Made of Honor	Melissa	
2009	He's Just Not That Into You	Kelli Ann	
2010	Revolution	Emily	Short film
2011	I Don't Know How She Does It	Wendy Best	
2012	The Reef 2: High Tide	Cordelia (voice)	
2012	Made in Cleveland	Shannon	
2013	A Case of You	Ashley	
2014	Jason Nash is Married	Busy Philipps	
2015	The Gift	Duffy	
2016	FML	Amanda	
2018	I Feel Pretty	Jane	
2022	DC League of Super-Pets	Foofy Dog (voice)	
2024	Mean Girls	Mrs. George	

=== Television ===
Year	Title	Role	Notes
1999	Saving Graces	Mindy	TV series
1999–2000	Freaks and Geeks	Kim Kelly	18 episodes
2000	Malcolm in the Middle	Meghan	Episode: "High School Play"
2001	Anatomy of a Hate Crime	Chasity Pasley	Television film
2001	Spring Break Lawyer	Jenny	Television film
2001	Dead Last	Tracy Sallback	Episode: "Death Is in the Air"
2001–2003	Dawson's Creek	Audrey Liddell	Main role (season 6); recurring (season 5)
2002	Undeclared	Kelly	2 episodes
2003	Criminology 101	Polly	Television film
2004	Foster Hall	Peg Hall	Television film
2005	Life As We Know It	Alex Morrill	2 episodes
2005	Testing Bob	Madison 'Maddie' West	Television film
2005	Super Robot Monkey Team Hyperforce Go!	Korlianne (voice)	Episode: "Girl Trouble"
2005–2006	Love, Inc.	Denise Johnson	22 episodes
2005, 2018	American Dad!	Dana / Blanch (voices)	2 episodes
2006–2007	ER	Dr. Hope Bobeck	19 episodes
2007	Entourage	Cheryl	Episode: "Dog Day Afternoon"
2007	How I Met Your Mother	Rachel	Episode: "Third Wheel"
2008–2009	Terminator: The Sarah Connor Chronicles	Kacy Corbin	5 episodes
2009	Kath & Kim	Whitney	Episode: "Competition"
2009–2015	Cougar Town	Laurie Keller	Main role
2011	Community	Greendale Team Member	Episode: "For a Few Paintballs More"
2011	Fish Hooks	Clamanda (voice)	Episode: "We've Got Fish Spirits"
2012	Don't Trust the B— in Apartment 23	Herself	Episode: "A Reunion..."
2012	RuPaul's Drag Race All Stars	Herself	Episode: "RuPaul's Gaff In"
2013	Arrested Development	Joan	Episode: "Borderline Personalities"
2014	Garfunkel and Oates	Karen	2 episodes
2014–2018	Drunk History	Various	3 episodes
2015	Bottom's Butte	Beverly Bottom (voice)	Episode: "Pilot"
2016	New Girl	Connie	Episode: "300 Feet"
2016	Angie Tribeca	Courtney Woodpatch-Newton	Episode: "Miso Dead"
2016	Bajillion Dollar Propertie$	Cate Kates	Episode: "Spiritual Gurus"
2016–2017	Vice Principals	Gale Liptrapp	Main role
2017	The Odd Couple	Natasha	Episode: "Should She Stay or Should She Go?"
2017	Chopped Junior	Herself (guest judge)	Episode: "Curry Hurry"
2017	The Sackett Sisters	Mandy Sackett	Episode: "Pilot"
2017	Beat Bobby Flay	Herself (guest judge)	Episode: "Tame the Flame"
2018	Camping	Allison	Episode: "Up All Night"
2018–2019	Unbreakable Kimmy Schmidt	Sheba Goodman	2 episodes
2018–2019	Busy Tonight	Herself (host)	Main role; also executive producer
2019	Astronomy Club: The Sketch Show		Episode: "Full House But Black"
2021	Search Party	Donna	Episode: "Home Again, Home Again, Jiggity-Jig"
2021–2024	Girls5eva	Summer Dutkowsky	Main role
2023	With Love	Amanda	Episode: "Lily's Double Quinceañera"
2023	Single Drunk Female	Darby	3 episodes
2024–present	Busy This Week	Herself (host)	Main role
2025	Stumble	Vicky	Episode: "Button Day"
2026	Bad Thoughts	Suzanne	Episode: "Bad Decisions"
2026	Cupertino	Natalia Boutella	

== Awards and nominations ==
Year	Award	Work	Category	Result
2003	Teen Choice Awards	Dawson's Creek	Choice TV: Sidekick	Nominated
2010	Entertainment Weekly	Cougar Town	Best Supporting Actress in a Comedy Series	Won
2011	Critics' Choice Television Awards	Cougar Town	Best Supporting Actress in a Comedy Series	Won
2011	Gold Derby Awards	Cougar Town	Comedy Supporting Actress	Nominated
