= A Clüsterfünke Christmas =

2021 television film

- Directed by: Anna Dokoza
- Written by: Ana Gasteyer; Rachel Dratch
- Starring: Ana Gasteyer; Rachel Dratch
- Cinematography: Graham Talbot; Nelson Talbot
- Music by: Hal Beckett
- Release date: 2021
- Running time: 87 minutes
- Country: United States
- Language: English

A Clüsterfünke Christmas is a 2021 made-for-television movie that is parody of Hallmark and Lifetime holiday romantic comedies. The film was written by and stars Ana Gasteyer and Rachel Dratch.
