= Sugar & Booze =

Studio album by Ana Gasteyer
- Released: October 25, 2019
- Recorded: 2019
- Genre: Holiday; jazz; swing
- Label: Henry's Girl

Ana Gasteyer chronology
I'm Hip (2014)	Sugar & Booze (2019)

Singles from Sugar & Booze
- 1. "Secret Santa" Released: October 10, 2019

Sugar & Booze (stylized as sugar & booze) is the second studio album by American actress, comedian, and singer Ana Gasteyer. Released in 2019, the album reached the top five of the Billboard Jazz Albums chart, and also entered the Holiday Albums Chart.

== Composition ==
The album draws stylistic inspiration from 1950s and 1960s jazz and swing. In an interview, Gasteyer said of the album, "It’s exactly the record I wanted to make. It’s nostalgic. It’s throwback. It’s joyful. It’s ridiculous. It’s happy." In an interview with Billboard, Gasteyer added that, contrary to expectations, it was not a comedy album, and remarked that "if I were to make a comedy album I'd hope it'd be funnier".

At the start of her work on the album, Gasteyer vowed to write three original holiday songs for it. The album includes a number of standards, including "Sleigh Ride" and "Let It Snow! Let It Snow! Let It Snow!"

"Secret Santa", the album's lead single, is presented as a phone call between Gasteyer and fellow former Saturday Night Live cast member Maya Rudolph. Writing for Entertainment Weekly, Maureen Lee Lenker described the song as "a cheeky song with a retro-Cuban beat that tells the fictional story about a Secret Santa gift quest that results in Gasteyer getting 'woke' in Havana". In "Nothing Rhymes with Christmas", Gasteyer attempts to find a rhyme for the holiday's name, and concludes that only one word does: isthmus.

In a statement, Gasteyer elaborated on her goals for the album: "We set out to make a new Holiday album with a throwback feel [...] This album is a nod to the swing sound of the 1950s and 1960s but with a modern twist. It is festive, with a full-bodied sound, that I hope makes people feel joyful, jolly and gay. I love records from the late 1950s and early 1960s that never scrimped on sound. That’s hard to do in this day and age, but we sought arrangements that utilized a proper band, including horn and percussion and created as full and lush a sound".

== Release ==
On October 11, 2019, "Secret Santa", was released as the album's lead single. The song was premiered on the Entertainment Weekly website, where it streamed exclusively.

The album was released by Henry's Girl Records on October 25, 2019.

== Chart performance ==
Sugar & Booze became a top 5 album on the US Billboard Jazz Albums chart and a top 50 album on the Billboard Holiday Albums chart. On the Jazz Albums chart, the album debuted at number 5 on the chart dated November 9, 2019. In its seventh week on the chart, dated December 21, 2019, the album attained a new peak of number 4.

On the Holiday Albums chart, the album peaked at number 47 on the chart dated November 9, 2019.

== Track listing ==
Adapted from album liner notes.

1. "Sugar and Booze" (Ana Gasteyer, Nicholas Williams)
2. "Nothing Rhymes with Christmas" (featuring Julian Fleisher) (Julian Fleisher)
3. "The Man with the Bag" (Irving Taylor, Dudley Brooks, Hal Stanley)
4. "He's Stuck in the Chimney Again" (Cy Coleman, Floyd Huddleston)
5. "Secret Santa" (featuring Maya Rudolph) (Ana Gasteyer, Nicholas Williams)
6. "I've Got My Love to Keep Me Warm" (Irving Berlin
7. "Let It Snow! Let It Snow! Let It Snow!" (Jule Styne, Sammy Cahn)
8. "You're a Mean One, Mr. Grinch" (Theodor Seuss Geisel, Albert Hague)
9. "Have Yourself a Merry Little Christmas" (Hugh Martin, Ralph Blane)
10. "In the Market for a Miracle" (Benj Pasek, Justin Paul)
11. "Blue Black Friday" (Ana Gasteyer, Tedd Firth)
12. "Sleigh Ride" (Leroy Anderson, Mitchell Parish)
13. "Children Go Where I Send Thee" (traditional)
14. "The Merriest" (Connie Pearce, Arnold Miller)
15. "Sugar and Booze" (edit) (Ana Gasteyer, Nicholas Williams)

== Charts ==
Chart (2019)	Peak position
US Top Holiday Albums (Billboard)	47
US Jazz Albums (Billboard)	4
