= I Feel Pretty (film) =

2018 American film directed by Abby Kohn and Marc Silverstein

- Theatrical release poster
- Directed by: Abby Kohn; Marc Silverstein
- Written by: Abby Kohn; Marc Silverstein
- Produced by: Nicolas Chartier; McG; Alissa Phillips; Dominic Rustam; Amy Schumer; Mary Viola
- Starring: Amy Schumer; Michelle Williams; Rory Scovel; Emily Ratajkowski; Aidy Bryant; Busy Philipps; Tom Hopper; Naomi Campbell; Lauren Hutton
- Cinematography: Florian Ballhaus
- Edited by: Tia Nolan
- Music by: Michael Andrews
- Production companies: STXfilms; H. Brothers; Tang Media Productions; Voltage Pictures; Wonderland
- Distributed by: STX Entertainment
- Release date: April 20, 2018 (United States)
- Running time: 110 minutes
- Country: United States
- Language: English
- Budget: $32 million
- Box office: $94.5 million

I Feel Pretty is a 2018 American comedy film written and directed by Abby Kohn and Marc Silverstein (in their directorial debuts). The film stars Amy Schumer, Michelle Williams, Emily Ratajkowski, Rory Scovel, Aidy Bryant, Busy Philipps, Tom Hopper, Naomi Campbell, and Lauren Hutton.

The plot involves an insecure woman who, after suffering a head injury, gains extreme self-confidence in her appearance.

The film was released in the United States on April 20, 2018, by STX Entertainment, and grossed $94.5 million worldwide. It received mixed reviews from critics, with some saying it did not fully commit to its premise or tone, although the performances of both Schumer and Williams were praised.

== Plot ==
Renee Bennett struggles with low self-esteem and manages the website for cosmetics firm Lily LeClaire. She decides not to apply for a receptionist position at the corporate headquarters, her dream job, after reading the job description's emphasis on being beautiful. She wishes at a fountain to be beautiful and the next day she falls, hitting her head.

Waking up with the belief that her appearance has magically changed, Renee approaches the world with newfound confidence. When a man named Ethan speaks to her innocuously, she insists that they exchange numbers. She applies for the receptionist position and is hired by CEO Avery LeClaire.

Renee asks Ethan out and enters a "bikini body" contest. She wins over the crowd but loses the competition, and tells Ethan that she does not need external validation to know she is beautiful. Ethan praises her self-knowledge, and she appreciates his openness over not yet knowing himself. They meet again for a picnic, after which they spend the night together.

Renee earns her coworkers' respect with her insight into the company's new diffusion line. Avery confides in her insecurity over her high-pitched voice, feeling that she is not taken seriously. Avery invites Renee and Ethan to a dinner meeting with her brother Grant and their grandmother, company founder Lily LeClaire.

Renee builds rapport with Lily, and Avery invites her to an important business meeting in Boston to give a key presentation. Renee becomes superficial in her treatment of people. She is judgmental of LeClaire visitors who are not fashionable or glamorous, and ditches her friends Vivian and Jane to attend an exclusive party with her coworkers.

In Boston, Renee nearly gives in to Grant's romantic overtures, avoiding a kiss when she receives a message from Ethan. She locks herself in the bathroom to avoid Grant, and while questioning her sense of self and her recent behavior, she suffers a new head injury in a fall in the shower. When Renee awakens, she perceives her real physical appearance.

Devastated, Renee leaves the hotel alone for New York, missing the presentation. She isolates herself in her apartment, avoiding Ethan and Avery's calls, binge drinking, and eating junk food. Drunk and miserable, she turns up at her friends' apartment and apologizes for her behavior. They reject her apology.

Assuming that Ethan will no longer be attracted to her, Renee breaks up with him over the phone, moments after speaking to him in person believing he does not recognize her. He is brokenhearted by Renee's rejection, blaming himself for having come on too strong. She tries but fails to recreate her original injury that she believes made her beautiful.

Renee encounters her beautiful acquaintance, Mallory, who is devastated over being dumped. Mallory says that she has low self-esteem and feels people assume her beauty means she is unintelligent.

When Renee hears that Mallory is auditioning to model for the LeClaire diffusion line, she realizes that LeClaire is out of touch with everyday women. She crashes the product launch and, in the course of a presentation where she displays her own before-and-after photos, she realizes that she was never transformed. Renee gives an impassioned speech about women accepting themselves as they are, presenting a collage of diverse real women, including Vivian and Jane, who appreciate the gesture.

Grant and Lily praise Avery for having the acumen to hire Renee; together, they are key to the success of the new line of products. Renee goes to Ethan's apartment and apologizes, explaining that her insecurities were related to her feelings about herself and not about him. Ethan tells her that she has always been the most beautiful woman in the world in his eyes, and they reconcile, confident and happy.

== Cast ==
- Amy Schumer as Renee Bennett, an ordinary woman who struggles with feelings of insecurity and inadequacy on a daily basis. She wakes up from a fall believing she is beautiful and capable, despite looking and being the same as always.
- Michelle Williams as Avery LeClaire, Renee's cosmetics company boss, Grant's sister and Lily's granddaughter.
- Rory Scovel as Ethan, Renee's love interest
- Emily Ratajkowski as Mallory, a woman who Renee looks up to because of her good looks.
- Busy Philipps as Jane, one of Renee's two best friends
- Aidy Bryant as Vivian, one of Renee's two best friends
- Tom Hopper as Grant LeClaire, Avery's brother and Lily's grandson
- Naomi Campbell as Helen, CFO of Lily LeClaire
- Lauren Hutton as Lily LeClaire, Grant and Avery's grandmother
- Adrian Martinez as Mason, Renee's coworker
- Sasheer Zamata as Tasha
- Dave Attell as Really Tan Dude
- Olivia Culpo as Hope
- Gia Crovatin as Sasha
- Camille Kostek as Hostess
- Nikki Glaser as Woman at LL HQ

== Production ==
On April 17, 2017, it was announced that Amy Schumer was signed on to star in I Feel Pretty, written and directed by Abby Kohn and Marc Silverstein, and set to commence principal production on the East Coast, particularly in Boston, Massachusetts, in July 2017.

In May 2017, STX Entertainment acquired the UK and domestic distribution rights for approximately $15 million at the 2017 Cannes Film Festival. By May 31, 2017, Michelle Williams had joined the cast. In June 2017, Emily Ratajkowski and Rafe Spall also joined. By July 28, 2017, Rory Scovel had replaced Spall, due to a "travel issue" that couldn't be resolved before the shoot, and the film had commenced principal production, with New York City added to the scheduled locations. On August 30, 2017, the supporting cast was announced.

== Release ==
I Feel Pretty was initially scheduled to be released on June 29, 2018, by STX Entertainment, but in February 2018 was moved up to April 27, 2018, due to strong test screening results. The release date was later changed again to April 20, 2018, a week earlier, to avoid competition with Avengers: Infinity War, which after I Feel Pretty's initial move, had itself moved from its May 4, 2018 date to April 27.

== Reception ==
=== Box office ===
I Feel Pretty grossed $48.8 million in the United States and Canada, and $45.7 million in other territories, for a worldwide total of $94.5 million, against a production budget of $32 million.

In the United States and Canada, I Feel Pretty was released alongside Traffik and Super Troopers 2, and was projected to gross $13–15 million from 3,440 theaters in its opening weekend. It made $6.3 million on its first day, including $1 million from Thursday night previews which was better than the $650,000 made by Schumer's Snatched the year before. It went on to open to $16.1 million, finishing third behind A Quiet Place and Rampage. The opening was lower than both of Schumer's previous two films, Trainwreck ($30 million) and Snatched ($19.5 million). In its second weekend the film dropped 49% to $8.1 million, remaining in third. It dropped another 40% in its third week, making $4.9 million and coming in fourth.

=== Critical response ===
On Rotten Tomatoes, the film has an approval rating of 35% based on 230 reviews, and an average rating of 5.1/10. The website's critical consensus reads, "I Feel Pretty has a charming star and the outline of a worthwhile comedy – but unlike its suddenly confident central character, it suffers from a fundamental lack of conviction." On Metacritic, the film has a weighted average score of 48 out of 100, based on 46 critics, indicating "mixed or average" reviews. Audiences polled by CinemaScore on opening weekend gave the film an average grade of "B+" on an A+ through F scale, with females under 18 giving it an "A+" and females under 25 grading it an "A."

David Ehrlich of IndieWire gave the film a "B+", saying: "Schumer's latest comedy could have used a few more polishes — it's a little flabby towards the backend, even if its star is totally fine just as she is — but it never slackens in its conviction that the world reflects how you feel about yourself, or in how empowering that can be if you come at it from the right angle." Variety's Peter Debruge gave the film a moderately positive review, saying, "What sets I Feel Pretty apart is the inspired premise that Renee's transformation takes place entirely in her head, while those around her are left befuddled by her sudden change of attitude."

J.R. Kinnard of PopMatters wrote, "The only people who won't be bored by I Feel Pretty are those whom it offends. It's a gross miscalculation that might mean well, but fails to balance the sharpness and delicacy necessary to tackle the emotional carnage wrought by self-hatred. That it forgets to make us laugh is the final insult."

Writing for Rolling Stone, Peter Travers gave the film 2.5 out of 4 stars, and criticized what he termed the hypocrisy of the filmmakers, saying, "...still: Is it really OK to get off making plus-size jokes just because you tack on a moralizing ending that teaches a lesson about body positivity? Can you have it both ways?" Michael Phillips of the Chicago Tribune also gave the film 2 out of 4 stars, and said, "I Feel Pretty [succumbs to all the wrong Hollywood contrivances]. It's just not funny or fresh enough, and that has everything to do with the material and how it's handled visually, and nothing to do with the people on the screen."

=== Accolades ===
Accolades for I Feel Pretty
Year	Award	Category	Nominee	Result
2018	MTV Movie & TV Awards	Best Comedic Performance	Amy Schumer	Nominated

== Controversies ==
After the release of the trailer, Jeffrey Wells of Hollywood Elsewhere pointed out that elements of I Feel Pretty appeared to resemble the plot of the 1945 film The Enchanted Cottage, without crediting it as an inspiration. Others accused the film of apparently body shaming, with Cosmopolitan writing, "[it's] insulting to anyone and everyone – from Amy herself all the way to women that are larger, less able-bodied...AKA, all the things that are promoted in society to be 'better.'"

Comedian Bill Maher vehemently defended the film against its allegations of body shaming, knocking Schumer's critics on his HBO television show Real Time with Bill Maher, stating, "Tonight I'd like to examine the reaction to Amy Schumer's new film I Feel Pretty, which the professionally offended have decided that even though it's a film by women filmmakers presenting an entirely pro-woman message, it does it the wrong way!"

== French remake ==
In 2021, a French language television movie remake of I Feel Pretty was produced by TF1. Titled Belle, belle, belle (transl. Beautiful, Beautiful, Beautiful), it was directed by Anne Depétrini and stars Joséphine Draï. The movie was released on August 3, 2021, on the streaming service Salto and aired on TF1 on August 23, 2021.
