= You Deserve Each Other =

American romantic comedy film

- Directed by: Abby Kohn; Marc Silverstein
- Screenplay by: Brett Haley; Marc Brasch; Abby Kohn; Marc Silverstein
- Based on: You Deserve Each Other by Sarah Hogle
- Produced by: Anthony Bregman; Peter Cron
- Starring: Penn Badgley; Meghann Fahy; Justin Long; Natalie Morales; Kyle MacLachlan; Ana Gasteyer; Hope Davis
- Cinematography: Steve Yedlin
- Edited by: Jon Philpot
- Music by: Christopher Bear
- Production companies: Fifth Season; Likely Story
- Distributed by: Amazon MGM Studios
- Country: United States
- Language: English

You Deserve Each Other is an upcoming American romantic comedy film from Amazon MGM Studios written and directed by Abby Kohn and Marc Silverstein and starring Penn Badgley and Meghann Fahy. It is an adaptation of the novel of the same name by Sarah Hogle.

== Premise ==
Ahead of planned nuptials both members of a couple suffer from cold feet and then try to goad each other into cancelling the wedding.

== Cast ==
- Penn Badgley as Nicholas Rose
- Meghann Fahy as Naomi Westfield
- Natalie Morales as Cassie
- Justin Long as Austin Frazier
- Kyle MacLachlan as Eugene Rose
- Ana Gasteyer as Deborah Rose
- Hope Davis as Kathy Duncan
- Delaney Rowe as Wren
- Lisa Gilroy as Wendy Duncan
- Alyssa Limperis as Sofia Frazier

== Production ==
The film is an adaptation of the novel by Sarah Hogle directed by Abby Kohn and Marc Silverstein with the pair also revising the script adaptation originally completed by Brett Haley and Marc Basch. The film is produced by Fifth Season with producers including Anthony Bregman and Peter Cron from Likely Story.

The cast is led by Meghann Fahy and Penn Badgley and includes Kyle MacLachlan and Justin Long. In July 2025, Natalie Morales, Ana Gasteyer, Timothy Busfield, Hope Davis, Delaney Rowe, Lisa Gilroy and Alyssa Limperis joined the cast. Following child molestation accusations made against him, Busfield's scenes as Bernie, the father of Fahy's character, were edited out. In October 2026 a New Mexico judge dropped all charges against Busfield and the case was subsequently dismissed.

Principal photography took place in New York City and the upper Hudson Valley from July to September 2025. The film is scheduled for release in early 2027.
