= Opposite Sex (TV series) =

2000 comedy drama television series

- Genre: Teen drama Comedy drama
- Created by: Abby Kohn; Marc Silverstein
- Starring: Milo Ventimiglia; Margot Finley; Kyle Howard; Chris Evans; Allison Mack; Lindsey McKeon
- Composer: Anna Waronker
- Country of origin: United States
- Original language: English
- No. of seasons: 1
- No. of episodes: 8

Production
- Executive producers: Rick Kellard; Randall Zisk
- Producer: Lewis Abel
- Cinematography: Johnny E. Jensen
- Editors: Jeff Betancourt; Joanna Cappuccilli; Mark Gerstein
- Running time: 43 minutes
- Production company: Warner Bros. Television

Original release
- Network: Fox
- Release: July 17 – September 4, 2000

Opposite Sex is an American teen comedy drama television series that aired on Fox from July 17 to September 4, 2000.

The series was initially shot in 1999 for the 1999–2000 season, but its broadcast was delayed to the summer of 2000. The series lasted eight episodes before being canceled.

== Synopsis ==
The series chronicles the life of Jed Perry (Milo Ventimiglia), a teenager who moves to Northern California along with his father shortly after the death of his mother. After enrolling at the prestigious Evergreen Academy, Jed finds out the school was formerly for girls, and recently became co-ed. Along with Jed, only two other boys attend the school, Philip Steffan (Kyle Howard) and Cary Baston (Chris Evans). The boys run into problems when the girls of the school are resistant to the changes and make it clear that their presence is unwanted.

== Cast ==
- Milo Ventimiglia as Jed Perry
- Kyle Howard as Philip Steffan
- Chris Evans as Cary Baston
- Margot Finley as Miranda Mills
- Lindsey McKeon as Stella
- Allison Mack as Kate Jacobs
- Garcelle Beauvais as Ms. Maya Bradley
- Rena Sofer as Ms. Gibson
- Chris McKenna as Rob Perry
- Christopher Cousins as Mr. Will Perry
- Alexandra Breckenridge as Francise

== Reception ==
Carole Horst of Variety wrote of the series, "Clever concept, sleek production values, a nice cast and thoughtful writing (for a teen show) add up to the enjoyable Opposite Sex". Horst added, "Despite all the good things in this gentle comedy drama, it's hard to say who the series is aimed at: It's not intellectual enough for "Freaks" fans and too grounded for the WB crowd. Young auds will have to seek it out. And therein lies the rub." Steve Johnson of the Chicago Tribune said the premise of the show is interesting but its "humor and sensibility" falls flat. Barry Garron of The Hollywood Reporter described Opposite Sex as a "far-fetched, overly earnest teen-oriented show" that "never manages to overcome its contrived premise and establish real emotional connections." He went on to say that "My So-Called Life and Freaks & Geeks have raised the bar for teen drama by providing keen insight into the awkwardness of adolescence" and that while not on the same level this series is "not nearly as cartoonish" as Saved by the Bell. Joel Brown, a New York Times syndicated columnist published in The Spokesman-Review found that "Ventimiglia conveys Jed's frustration well" but that "bad TV cliches overwhelm this show's mild promise." The Modesto Bee's TV critic, Kevin McDonough, describes the series as "hardly the worst teen show of the year" and stated that "it lacks the soft-core exploitation that permeates Young Americans." David Bianculli of the New York Daily News gave a positive review, writing, "Abby Kohn and Marc Silverstein, creators and co-executive producers of 'Opposite Sex,' are as aware of the subtle and often painful interplays and power plays of high-school life as were the makers of, say, 'My So-Called Life'".

== Episodes ==
No.	Title	Directed by	Written by	Original release date
1	"Pilot"	Donald Petrie	Abby Kohn & Marc Silverstein	July 17, 2000
Jed Perry (Milo Ventimiglia) becomes one of the first boys ever to attend Evergreen Academy when he moves to a new town. He quickly bonds with the only other male students, Cary (Chris Evans) and Phil (Kyle Howard), when the girls, led by Stella (Lindsey McKeon), ostracize them. But when Miranda Mills (Margot Finley), a free-spirited sophomore, takes an interest in Jed, she helps the boys gain acceptance with a stunt at the annual Evergreen Lady's Night talent show.
2	"The Virgin Episode"	Randall Zisk	Abby Kohn & Marc Silverstein	July 24, 2000
Miranda's birthday party is approaching, a legendary event where two virgins are "sacrificed". Jed, the only one of the boys who openly admits to be a virgin, is naturally selected and his friendship with Kate (Allison Mack), another suspected virgin, develops. Meanwhile, Cary, who has been flaunting his sexual experience, becomes the target of Stella's campaign to remove the boys from school. The boys discover that the school has a history of expelling girls with an unwholesome reputation, so they decide to track them down in the hopes of gleaning some information that might save Cary's place at Evergreen.
3	"The Drug Episode"	Danny Leiner	Abby Kohn & Marc Silverstein	July 31, 2000
After the boys discover the janitor's stash of marijuana, the school hires a new drug counselor, Greg Tillman (Dax Griffin), to speak with the students. Jed instantly forms a strong dislike of him, due to his good looks and the lust he provokes in the entire student body, including Miranda and Kate. When word gets out that Cary is "hooked up" and he instantly becomes popular with some of the girls, he decides to play up to his new reputation. Meanwhile, Phil runs an ill-fated campaign for city council with a strong position against drugs.
4	"The Homosexual Episode"	Randall Zisk	Nick Harding	August 7, 2000
It's Bow Down week at Evergreen Academy, an annual tradition in which seniors select a junior to be their personal slave for a week. Jed is picked by Joely (Nicki Aycox), an open lesbian, who begins to show a strong attraction to him. Completely confused, he tries to work out whether he's just imagining it. Meanwhile, Cary incurs the wrath of popular girl Cassie Schreiber (Joanna García) after he leads a revolt against the seniors, and is threatened with the mythical "360".
5	"The Dance Episode"	Kenneth Fink	Rick Kellard	August 14, 2000
The boys wonder if they're losing their masculinity. As a school dance approaches, a rift is formed in the boys' friendship when Phil starts to pursue Kate, much to Jed's chagrin. Meanwhile, Cary is humiliated by a student from the nearby military school Fort Union and vows to get revenge.
6	"The Field Trip Episode"	Ian Toynton	Carole Real	August 21, 2000
The juniors of Evergreen Academy travel to New York for a Model U.N. summit, where Jed is reunited with his ex-girlfriend, Lisa (Christine Lakin). When Lisa and Kate, Jed's current love interest, become awfully friendly with each other, Cary persuades Jed that a "ménage à trois" is on the cards. Meanwhile, Phil befriends some boys from Fort Union, and sparks fly between Cary and Stella.
7	"The Fantasy Episode"	Randall Zisk	Abby Kohn & Marc Silverstein	August 28, 2000
When Stella gets severely drunk on Miranda's hidden supply of Everclear just as the student body is leaving for a field trip, the boys, along with Miranda and Kate, smuggle her back into the now empty school. With only the supervision of Greg Tillman, the drug counselor who they called to help with Stella, the gang spend the night on the Evergreen campus, where Miranda asks Jed to sleep with her, Phil and Kate bond in the school kitchens, and Cary comes to Stella's rescue.
8	"The Car Episode"	Adam Nimoy	Abby Kohn & Marc Silverstein	September 4, 2000
When he finds himself dating both Miranda and Kate at the same time, Jed is forced to decide who he really wants to be with. He chooses Kate, but shortly afterwards she learns about his two-timing and breaks up with him. Phil, with his eye on the newly single Kate, decides that he needs a driver's license to win her heart. Meanwhile, Cary and Stella are forced to cater to a band geek's every whim in order to keep their relationship secret. Having finally decided on Kate, Jed goes to extreme lengths to try to get her back.
