= Ana Gasteyer =

American actor and comedian (born 1967)

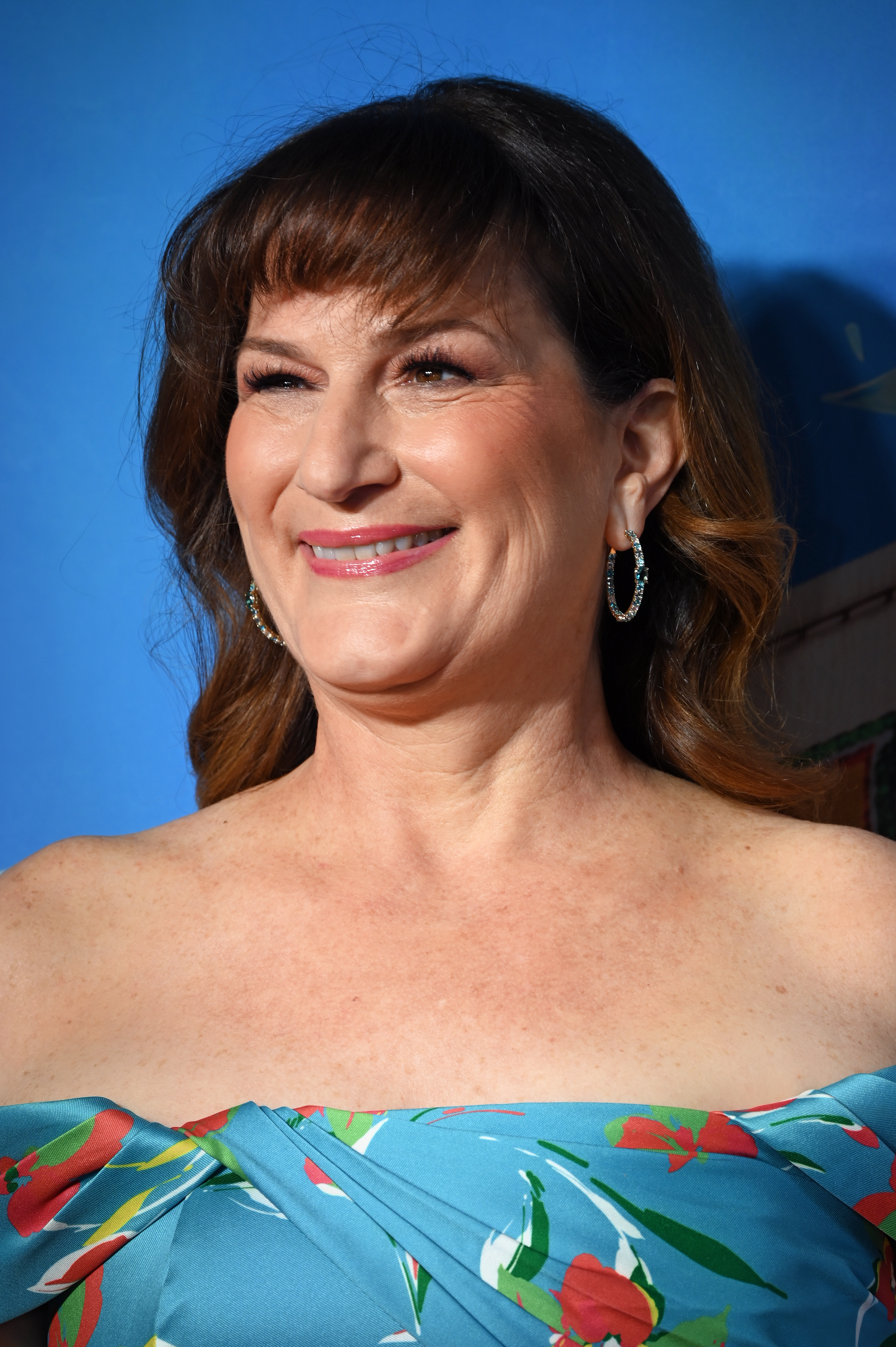
- Gasteyer in 2026
- Born: May 4, 1967 (age 59); Washington, D.C., U.S.
- Education: Northwestern University (BA)
- Occupations: Actress; comedian; singer
- Years active: 1987–present
- Spouse: Charlie McKittrick (m. 1996)
- Children: 2

Ana Gasteyer (/ˈɑːnə ˈɡæˌstaɪ.ər/; born May 4, 1967) is an American actress, comedian and singer. She was a cast member on the NBC sketch comedy series Saturday Night Live from 1996 to 2002. She has since starred in such sitcoms as ABC's Suburgatory, TBS's People of Earth, NBC's American Auto, and the film Mean Girls.

== Early life ==
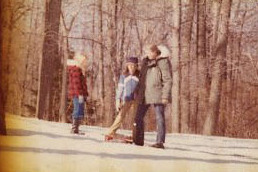
Gasteyer (center) with Amy Carter (left) and President Carter at Camp David in 1978

Gasteyer was born in Washington, D.C., the daughter of Mariana (née Roumell), an artist, and Phil Gasteyer, a lobbyist who later became the mayor of Corrales, New Mexico. Gasteyer grew up on Capitol Hill, three blocks from the Capitol. Her maternal grandparents were Romanian and Greek. As a child, Gasteyer was friends with Amy Carter, daughter of then-president Jimmy Carter, whom she bonded with through the violin. She has spoken of how she spent the night at the White House as a child, watched Star Wars with the Sadat family, and saw President Carter "laughing hysterically" as he watched Dan Aykroyd portray him on SNL.

Gasteyer graduated from Sidwell Friends School,and trained during the summers at Interlochen Center for the Arts. She enrolled as a music major at Northwestern University, and graduated from Northwestern University School of Communication in 1989.

== Career ==
Gasteyer developed comedy experience with the Los Angeles improv – sketch comedy group The Groundlings. She played small roles on Seinfeld (as a doomed customer of The Soup Nazi) as well as on the shows Party of Five, Frasier, Hope & Gloria, and NYPD Blue. In 1996, she joined the cast of Saturday Night Live. Among her most popular characters on the show were high school music teacher Bobbie Mohan-Culp; Margaret Jo McCullen, the National Public Radio host of Delicious Dish; folk singer Cinder Calhoun who sang feminist songs at Lilith Fair; and her impressions of Martha Stewart and Celine Dion. In 2000, she and Chris Parnell auditioned to succeed Colin Quinn as co-anchors of the news parody segment Weekend Update, but the positions went to Tina Fey and Jimmy Fallon.

After six seasons, Gasteyer left SNL in 2002. Subsequently, she appeared in various television programs, films and stage productions. In 2004, Gasteyer played the mother of the main character Cady Heron (Lindsay Lohan) in the feature film Mean Girls, written by SNL castmate Tina Fey. The film also featured other former SNL castmates, including Fey, Tim Meadows, and Amy Poehler. Gasteyer appeared in the 2005 Showtime musical film Reefer Madness as Mae, the doomed girlfriend of Jack and owner of the Reefer Den.

Gasteyer starred in a revival of The Threepenny Opera on Broadway as Mrs. Peachum, along with Jim Dale, Alan Cumming, and Cyndi Lauper. The production ran from March 24 through June 25, 2006.

On June 24, 2005, Gasteyer originated the role of Elphaba in the Chicago sit-down production of the musical Wicked, alongside Kate Reinders as Glinda. The production opened July 13, 2005. Gasteyer was nominated for a Jefferson Award for her performance. She played her final performance on January 22, 2006, replaced by her standby Kristy Cates. She later reprised the role in the Broadway production from October 10, 2006, through January 7, 2007, replacing Eden Espinosa.

On April 12, 2007, the media announced that Gasteyer had joined the cast of the then-new musical Writing Arthur for the 2007 New Works Festival for TheatreWorks in California, which ran from April 14 to 22. Gasteyer performed in Chicago in the Stephen Sondheim musical Passion at Chicago Shakespeare Theater from October 2, 2007, through November 11, 2007.

She was originally cast as Gloria in the 2008 Encores! Summer Series production of Damn Yankees, but due to injury during rehearsals, she was replaced by Megan Lawrence. Gasteyer took part in the reading of the Broadway musical version of The First Wives Club in January 2009.

She starred as Kitty Dean in the Broadway play The Royal Family which began performances at the Samuel J. Friedman Theatre on September 15, 2009, and officially opened on October 8, 2009. The show concluded its run on December 13, 2009. Gasteyer also starred as Frisco Kate Fothergill in the City Centers Encores! production of Girl Crazy, running from November 19 to 22, 2009.

She returned to Saturday Night Live for a special Mother's Day episode on May 8, 2010, and for another Mother's Day episode on May 11, 2012.

Gasteyer appeared in season eight of Curb Your Enthusiasm as Larry David's girlfriend.

From 2011 to 2014, Gasteyer co-starred as Sheila Shay on the ABC comedy series Suburgatory, and, as of March 2013, she was a spokeswoman for the Weight Watchers diet plan. Gasteyer has been a guest narrator at Disney's Candlelight Processional at Walt Disney World in 2014, 2015, 2017, and 2021.

In 2014, taking advantage of her training as a singer, Gasteyer recorded and released I'm Hip, an album of jazz standards including "One Mint Julep". In 2015, she played Mimi Schwinn in the New York City Center Encores! Off-Broadway revival of the musical A New Brain, also appearing on the cast recording.

From 2016 to 2017, Gasteyer had a starring role on TBS's cult hit People of Earth as the leader of an alien abductee support group.

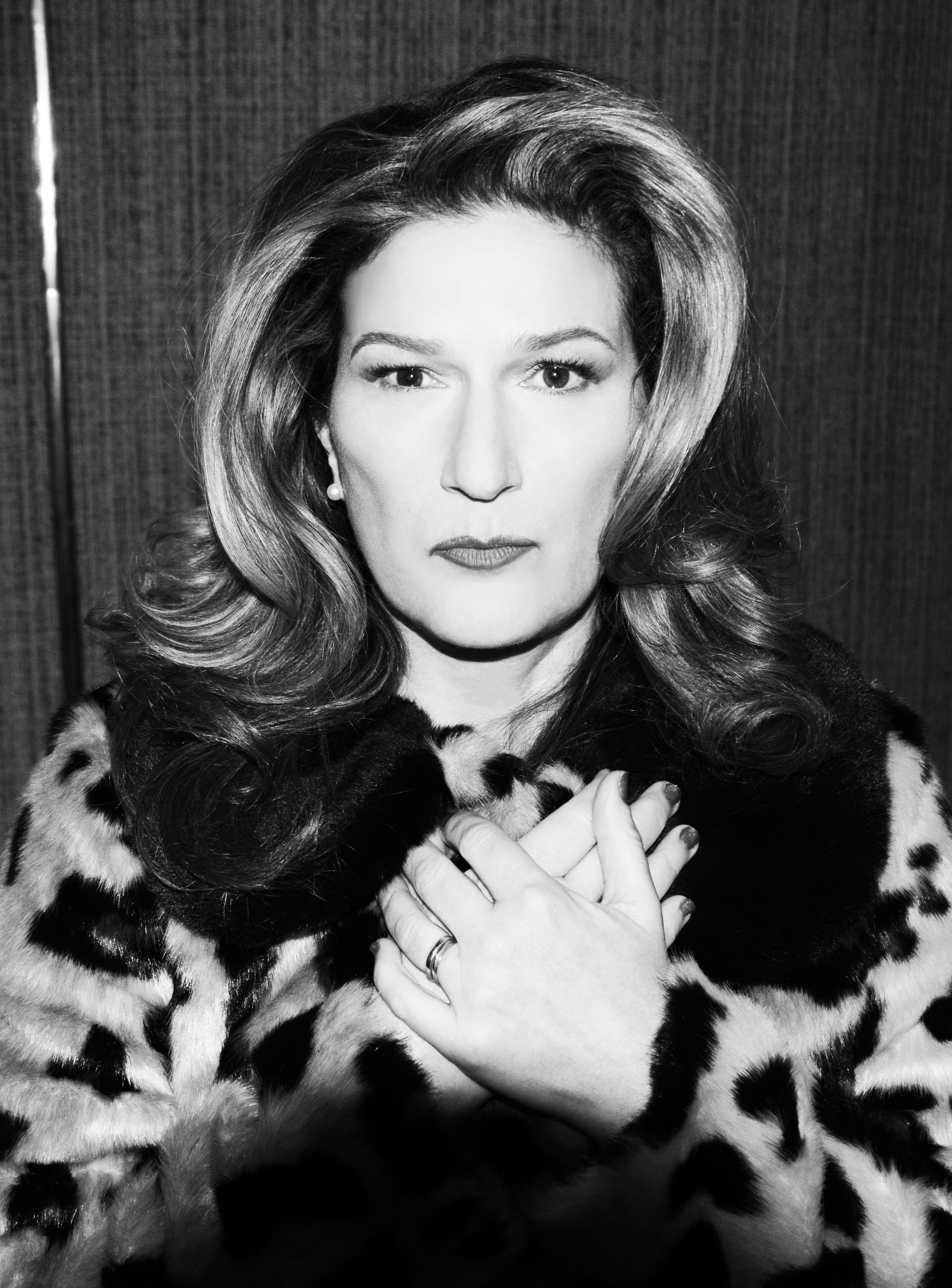
Gasteyer in 2018

In October 2019, she released the holiday album Sugar & Booze which was later accompanied by an Audible Original comedy piece titled Holiday Greetings from Sugar and Booze, featuring Gasteyer along with Maya Rudolph, Oscar Nunez, and Patti LuPone. Gasteyer later appeared as a contestant on the second season of The Masked Singer as "Tree".

In February 2020, it was announced that Gasteyer will play Katherine Hastings in the NBC comedy pilot American Auto, written by Justin Spitzer. The show's production was delayed due to the COVID-19 pandemic and skipped the step to premiere in the 2021–2022 broadcast season. In September and October 2020, she voiced a red panda named Nut in an adult animated series titled Magical Girl Friendship Squad.

In 2024, Gasteyer starred as Queen Aggravain alongside Sutton Foster, Will Chase, Brooks Ashmanskas, Daniel Breaker, and Michael Urie in a Broadway revival of Once Upon a Mattress. The Broadway production ran from July through November 2024 at the Hudson Theatre. It played 128 performances. The show subsequently played a limited run in Los Angeles with the Center Theatre Group following its Broadway closing. In 2026, Gasteyer originated the role of Mildred Layton in the Broadway production of Schmigadoon! She received a nomination for the Tony Award for Best Featured Actress in a Musical for her performance.

=== Saturday Night Live characters ===
==== Original characters ====
- Bobbie Mohan-Culp, the operatic-voiced high school music teacher (with Will Ferrell)
- Margaret Jo McCullen, co-host of the NPR radio show Delicious Dish (with Molly Shannon)
- Gemini's Twin singer Jonette (with Maya Rudolph)
- Cinder Calhoun, a politically correct Lilith Fair singer
- Fast-talking MTV VJ Kincaid
- Daytime talk show hostess of Pretty Living, Gayle Gleeson

==== Celebrity impressions ====
- Martha Stewart
- Céline Dion (on The Celine Dion Show)
- Katherine Harris
- Joy Behar
- Joan Rivers
- Sally Jesse Raphael
- Elizabeth Dole
- Kathy Griffin
- Carrie Donovan (Vogue style editor featured in the Old Navy commercials)
- Bea Arthur
- Barbra Streisand (auditioning for Star Wars)
- Helen Thomas
- Hillary Clinton
- Mia Farrow
- Victoria Beckham
- Geri Halliwell
- Christina Aguilera
- Laura Schlessinger
- Debbie Matenopoulos
- Elizabeth Hurley
- Lynda Lopez
- Lisa Kudrow (as Phoebe Buffay on Friends)
- Jewel
- Cokie Roberts
- Madonna
- Andie MacDowell
- Nancy Grace
- Ann B. Davis
- Cynthia Nixon (as Miranda Hobbes on Sex and the City)
- Glenn Close
- Renee O'Connor (as Gabrielle on Xena: Warrior Princess)
- Darva Conger
- Amelia Earhart
- Christie Whitman
- Diane Sawyer
- Jane Fonda
- Theresa Saldana
- Jo Anne Worley
- Susan McDougal
- Allison Janney (as C. J. Cregg on The West Wing)
- Betty Ford
- Jamie Gangel
- Lara Flynn Boyle (as Helen Gamble on The Practice)
- Anne Heche
- Kathryn Beaumont

== Personal life ==
Gasteyer married her husband, Charlie McKittrick, in 1996. They live in Brooklyn, New York with their two children.

== Acting credits ==
=== Film ===
Year	Title	Role
1996	A Small Domain	Mother
1997	Courting Courtney	Rosemary Colletti
1998	Meet the Deedles	Mel
1999	Dick	Rose Mary Woods
2000	Woman on Top	Claudia Hunter
2000	What Women Want	Sue Cranston
2001	What's the Worst That Could Happen?	Ann Marie
2004	Mean Girls	Betsy Heron
2005	Reefer Madness: The Musical	Mae Coleman
2007	The Procedure	Denise
2008	Finn on the Fly	Dr. Madsen
2008	The Women	Pat
2009	Dare	Ruth Berger
2012	Robot & Frank	Shop Lady
2012	That's My Boy	Mrs. Ravensdale
2012	Fun Size	Jackie Leroux
2013	Geography Club	Mrs. Toles
2013	Peeples	Mayor Hodge
2013	Rapture-Palooza	Mrs. Lewis
2015	Paul Blart: Mall Cop 2	Mrs. Gundermutt
2019	Adam	Mrs. Freeman
2019	Wine Country	Catherine Stewart
2020	Happiest Season	Harry Levin
2024	Doin' It	Principal Fletcher
2026	Never Change!	
TBA	You Deserve Each Other	Deborah Rose

=== Television ===
Year	Title	Character	Notes
1995	Seinfeld	Woman	Episode: "The Soup Nazi"
1996	Hope and Gloria	Girl	Episode: "The Man Upstairs"
1996	Party of Five	Emcee	Episode: "Valentine's Day"
1996	NYPD Blue	Angie	Episode: "A Death in the Family"
1996–2002	Saturday Night Live	Various	Main role; 121 episodes
1998	Law & Order	Monica's Social Worker	Episode: "Bad Girl"
1998	Just Shoot Me!	April	Episode: "What the Teddy Bear Saw"
1998	Mad About You	Yoga Woman	Episode: "Season Opener"
2000	3rd Rock from the Sun	Dr. Brand / Herself	3 episodes
2000	Behind the Music	Herself	Episode: "Celine Dion"
2000	Geppetto	Sra. Giovanni	TV movie
2000–2001	TV Funhouse	Various voices	3 episodes
2001	The West Wing	Butterball Hotline Operator	Episode: "The Indians in the Lobby" (uncredited)
2002	Frasier	Trish Haney	Episode: "Bristle While You Work"
2003	I'm with Her	Bonnie	Episode: "Alex Misses the Boat"
2009	Valentine	Mona McAllister	Episode: "Hound Dog"
2009	The Electric Company	Sandy Scrambler	Episode: "Friends or Aunts"
2010	Chuck	Dasha	Episode: "Chuck Versus the First Fight"
2010	Running Wilde	Anna Lowry	Episode: "It's a Trade-Off"
2010–2014	The Good Wife	Judge Patrice Lessner	5 episodes
2011	Curb Your Enthusiasm	Jennifer	2 episodes
2011–2014	Suburgatory	Sheila Shay	Main role; 42 episodes
2013	Fish Hooks	Hot Cocoa	Voice, episode: "See Bea Ski"
2014	Family Guy	Speed Dater	Voice, episode: "The 2000-Year-Old Virgin"
2014–2021	The Goldbergs	Miss Susan Cinoman	15 episodes
2015	The Mindy Project	Barb Gurglar	Episode: "Stanford"
2015	Girls	Melanie Shapiro	Episode: "Iowa"
2015	Younger	Meredith Montgomery	Episode: "The Boy with the Dragon Tattoo"
2015	Difficult People	Woman at Cafe	Episode: "Even Later"
2015	Celebrity Name Game	Herself	Episode: "Ana Gasteyer vs. Billy Gardell"
2015–2016	Dawn of the Croods	Meep Boor	Voice, 5 episodes
2015–2017	Harvey Beaks	Tara	Voice, 9 episodes
2016	Grease Live!	Principal McGee	TV movie
2016	Mike Tyson Mysteries	Genevieve	Voice, episode: "The Bard's Curse"
2016	Maya & Marty	Scientist	Episode: "Will Forte, Jerry Seinfeld, Amy Poehler, Kevin Kline & Ana Gasteyer"
2016	The $100,000 Pyramid	Herself	Episode: "Ana Gasteyer vs. Rachel Dratch"
2016–2017	Lady Dynamite	Karen Grisham	17 episodes
2016–2017	People of Earth	Gina Morrison	Main role; 20 episodes
2016–2019	The Lion Guard	Reirei	Voice; 12 episodes
2016–2025	Match Game	Herself	10 episodes
2017	A Christmas Story Live!	Mrs. Schwartz	TV movie
2017–2018	Great News	Kelly	3 episodes
2018	Voltron: Legendary Defender	Krolia	Voice, 9 episodes
2018	Full Frontal with Samantha Bee	Debra Bee	Episode: "Christmas on I.C.E."
2019	Schooled	Miss Susan Cinoman	5 episodes
2019	The Masked Singer	Tree	5 episodes
2019–2020	At Home with Amy Sedaris	Darlene Cornish / Colleen	2 episodes
2019–2021	Mickey and the Roadster Racers	Wilhelmina	Voice, 2 episodes
2020	Prodigal Son	Tilda Carp	Episode: "Death's Door"
2020	Duncanville	Janine	Voice, episode: "Fridgy"
2020	Archibald's Next Big Thing	Mimsy	Voice, episode: "Baritone Tea"
2020	Magical Girl Friendship Squad	Nut	Main role; voice, 6 episodes
2021	Bless the Harts	Sam	Voice, episode: "Tiny Pies"
2021	Inside Job	Dolores	Voice, episode: "Sex Machina"
2021	A Clüsterfünke Christmas	Hildy Clüsterfünke	TV movie
2021–2023	American Auto	Katherine Hastings	Main role; 23 episodes
2022–2023	Alice's Wonderland Bakery	Kiki	Voice, 4 episodes
2023	Ridley Jones	Amanda Cornwallis	Voice, episode: "Game of Jones"
2024	Royal Crackers	Mayor	Voice, episode: "Mall"
2024	Loot	Grace	3 episodes
2024	Hamster & Gretel	Lorraine Ampersand	Voice, episode: "Lorraine, Rattle, and Roll"
2025	Krapopolis	Clotho	Voice, episode: "John Fate Comes a-Knockin"
2025–2026	RoboGobo	Crabitha	Main role; voice, 23 episodes

=== Theatre ===
Year	Title	Role	Venue
2000	The Rocky Horror Show	Usherette; Columbia	Circle in the Square Theatre, Broadway
2002	Funny Girl	Fanny Brice	New Amsterdam Theatre, Broadway (Benefit Concert for The Actors' Fund)
2003	Kimberly Akimbo	Debra	New York City Center - Stage I, Off-Broadway
2004	Roulette	Virginia	John Houseman Theatre, Off-Broadway
2004	Hair	Performer	New Amsterdam Theatre, Broadway (Benefit Concert for The Actors' Fund)
2005	Wicked	Elphaba	Ford Center for the Performing Arts Oriental Theatre, Chicago
2006	The Threepenny Opera	Mrs. Peachum	Studio 54, Broadway
2006–2007	Wicked	Elphaba	Gershwin Theatre, Broadway
2007	Passion	Fosca	Chicago Shakespeare Theatre
2009	Chance & Chemistry	Performer	Minskoff Theatre, Broadway (Benefit Concert for The Actors' Fund)
2009	The Royal Family	Kitty Dean	Samuel J. Friedman Theatre, Broadway
2015	A New Brain	Mimi Schwinn	New York City Center, Encores!
2018	Annie	Miss Hannigan	Hollywood Bowl
2024	Once Upon a Mattress	Queen Aggravain	Hudson Theatre, Broadway
2024–2025	Once Upon a Mattress	Queen Aggravain	Ahmanson Theatre
2026	Schmigadoon!	Mildred Layton	Nederlander Theatre, Broadway
2026	September L. Davis: The Apology Tour	September L. Davis	Studio Seaview, Off-Broadway

=== Web ===
Year	Title	Character	Episodes
2015	Going There with Ana Gasteyer	Herself	9

== Discography ==
- I'm Hip (2014)
- Sugar & Booze (2019)

== Awards and nominations ==
Year	Organisation	Category	Project	Result	Ref.
2005	Jeff Awards	Actress in a Principal Role in a Musical	Wicked	Nominated	
2008	Jeff Awards	Actress in a Principal Role in a Musical	Passion	Nominated	
2025	Children's and Family Emmy Awards	Outstanding Voice Performer in a Preschool Program	RoboGobo	Won	
2026	Tony Awards	Best Featured Actress in a Musical	Schmigadoon!	Nominated	
2026	Dorian Awards	Outstanding Featured Performance in a Broadway Musical	Schmigadoon!	Nominated	
2027	Grammy Awards	Best Musical Theater Album	Schmigadoon!	Pending	
