= Abby Kohn =

American screenwriter and director

- Born: Los Angeles
- Education: Northwestern University
- Occupations: Screenwriter, Director
- Spouse: Jason Linn (m. 2006)
- Children: 2

Abby Kohn is an American screenwriter and director. She is best known for writing popular romantic comedy films such as Never Been Kissed, He's Just Not That into You, Valentine's Day and How to Be Single. She also co-wrote the romantic drama film The Vow. Additionally she co-created the short-lived television series Opposite Sex. Kohn's first co-writing and directing feature film was the 2018 comedy, I Feel Pretty, starring Amy Schumer and Michelle Williams. While her second, You Deserve Each Other featuring Penn Badgley and Meghann Fahy, is scheduled for release in 2027.

After graduating from Northwestern University, Kohn met her frequent collaborator Marc Silverstein while attending the MFA program at the USC School of Cinematic Arts in Los Angeles, California. According to the website Boxofficemojo, their films have grossed over $900 million.

== Filmography ==
With Marc Silverstein

Year	Title	Directors	Writers
1999	Never Been Kissed	No	Yes
2009	He's Just Not That into You	No	Yes
2010	Valentine's Day	No	Yes
2012	The Vow	No	Yes
2016	How to Be Single	No	Yes
2018	I Feel Pretty	Yes	Yes
2027	You Deserve Each Other	Yes	Yes

Special thanks

- Lewis and Clark and George (1997)
