= Marc Silverstein =

American actor

- Born: July 1, 1971 (age 54)
- Occupations: Screenwriter, film director
- Spouse: Busy Philipps (m. 2007; sep. 2021)
- Children: 2

Marc Silverstein (born July 1, 1971) is an American screenwriter, producer and film director.

== Biography ==
Silverstein was born to a Jewish family. His writing partner is Abby Kohn. They are known for co-writing romantic comedy films such as Never Been Kissed, He's Just Not That into You, How to Be Single, and the story for Valentine's Day. Their first co-directing project was I Feel Pretty starring Amy Schumer. They also co-wrote the romantic drama film The Vow. They also created the short-lived series Opposite Sex in 2000.

== Personal life ==
Silverstein married actress Busy Philipps on June 16, 2007, and they have two daughters. They separated in February 2021.

== Filmography ==
With Abby Kohn

Year	Title	Director	Writer
1999	Never Been Kissed	No	Yes
2009	He's Just Not That into You	No	Yes
2010	Valentine's Day	No	story
2012	The Vow	No	Yes
2016	How to Be Single	No	Yes
2018	I Feel Pretty	Yes	Yes
2026	You Deserve Each Other	Yes	Yes

Special thanks

- Lewis and Clark and George (1997)
