= The Creep (song) =

2011 single by the Lonely Island

Single by the Lonely Island featuring Nicki Minaj

from the album Turtleneck & Chain
- Released: January 29, 2011
- Recorded: 2010
- Genre: Comedy hip hop
- Length: 2:40
- Label: Universal Republic
- Songwriters: Andy Samberg; Akiva Schaffer; Jorma Taccone; Scott Jung
- Producer: CHOPS

The Lonely Island singles chronology
"I Just Had Sex" (2010)	"The Creep" (2011)	"We're Back!" (2011)

Nicki Minaj singles chronology
"Moment 4 Life" (2010)	"The Creep" (2011)	"Super Bass" (2011)

"The Creep" is a song by American comedy hip hop group the Lonely Island, released as the second single from their second studio album Turtleneck & Chain. It features rapper Nicki Minaj. Filmmaker John Waters also gives the introduction to the song as well as the last line of the song. He is credited as a featured artist on the album, but not the single. The song as well as its music video made its debut on Saturday Night Live on January 29, 2011.

The song and its lyrics revolve around a dance called the "Creep", as well as "creeping" in various scenarios and places.

== Background ==
"The Creep" was written by the Lonely Island during the summer of 2010. The comedy troupe, in the same fashion to the recording process for their debut, Incredibad, rented a house in Los Angeles and created a makeshift studio where they would record songs. Schaffer first created the idea for the dance, and the troupe then decided that it would be best for Waters to introduce the song, as they were all fans of his work.

== Music video ==
The video begins with an introduction by John Waters; the song begins, and the three members of the Lonely Island come out "doing the creep", the dance that the song revolves around. They are also dressed as "creepers", wearing grey suits, green ties, pencil mustaches and big-framed glasses. The video generally revolves around the lyrical content of the song, and the Lonely Island are seen creeping in various places. After the first two verses, Nicki Minaj raps the third verse from a female point of view as a "creeper", hiding inside a locker in a male locker room. The video and the song end with a reappearance by John Waters, who creepily says, "Don't forget to smile!"

== Charts ==
Chart (2011)	Peak position
Canada Hot 100 (Billboard)	90
US Billboard Hot 100	82
