= We're Back! =

Single by The Lonely Island

from the album Turtleneck & Chain
- Released: April 1, 2011
- Genre: Comedy hip hop; hardcore hip hop
- Length: 1:59
- Label: Universal Republic Records
- Songwriters: Andy Samberg; Akiva Schaffer; Jorma Taccone; Brendan Long; Brandon Lamela
- Producers: Villanova; B-Sides

The Lonely Island singles chronology
| "The Creep" (2011) | "We're Back!" (2011) | "Motherlover" (2011) |

"We're Back!" is the first track and third single from The Lonely Island's second album Turtleneck & Chain. The song was first performed on Late Night with Jimmy Fallon on April 1, 2011 while the album was released on May 10, 2011. The video contains a cameo appearance from Ugly Betty actress America Ferrera.

== Composition and theme ==
The song consists of a form of call and response between Jorma Taccone on one hand, and Akiva Schaffer and Andy Samberg (as well as Taccone himself on one occasion) responding with brief rhymes. These rhymes center around sexual and scatological themes, including erectile dysfunction, genital odors, incontinence and STDs. A comic effect is achieved by the contrast between the self-aggrandizing style typical of mainstream hip hop music (specifically mixtapes), and the self-deprecating lyrical content. A typical exchange goes:

Jorma: Lonely Island, Grammy-nominated, yeah! Hit 'em again.

Akiva: Yo straight out the box with my soggy, little shrimp
I was an eight year old girl before the doctor found my dick!

Jorma: We make too much money for this shit! Murder music...

The song prominently features a sped-up sample from "That's How It Is" by Laura Lee.

== Reception ==
Within a few days of its release, the video for the song had received over a million hits on YouTube. Salon.com's Drew Grant found the song "not as catchy as some of their other work", but still appreciated its way of "subverting the standard conventions of hip-hop". Jay Hathaway of Urlesque called the track "the most gangsta ode to erectile dysfunction ever".
