= Turtleneck & Chain =

Studio album by The Lonely Island
- Released: May 10, 2011
- Recorded: 2009–2011
- Genres: Comedy hip-hop; hip-hop; electro
- Length: 38:55
- Label: Universal Republic
- Producers: 6th Sense; Asa Taccone; Beck; B-Sides; CHOPS; DJ Frank E; DJ Nu-Mark; Drew Campbell; JMIKE; KnocDown; the Lonely Island; Michael Woods; Sean Maxvel; SKINS; Stargate; T-Minus; Villanova

The Lonely Island chronology
Incredibad (2009)	Turtleneck & Chain (2011)	The Wack Album (2013)

Singles from Turtleneck & Chain
- 1. "I Just Had Sex" Released: December 19, 2010; 2. "The Creep" Released: January 30, 2011; 3. "We're Back!" Released: April 1, 2011; 4. "Motherlover" Released: April 19, 2011; 5. "Turtleneck & Chain" Released: April 29, 2011; 6. "Jack Sparrow" Released: May 7, 2011

Professional ratings
Aggregate scores
Source	Rating
AnyDecentMusic?	6.8/10
Metacritic	78/100
Review scores
Source	Rating
AllMusic	3.5/5 stars
The A.V. Club	A
Blare	3.5/5 stars
Entertainment Weekly	B
Los Angeles Times	3/4 stars
NME	2/5 stars
Rolling Stone	3.5/5 stars
Pitchfork	7.1/10

Turtleneck & Chain is the second studio album by American comedy troupe The Lonely Island. The album was released on May 10, 2011, by Universal Republic Records. Turtleneck & Chain was nominated for the Grammy Award for Best Comedy Album. Many of the songs on the album were first performed on Saturday Night Live as SNL Digital Shorts ("I Just Had Sex", "Jack Sparrow", "Shy Ronnie 2: Ronnie & Clyde", "Motherlover", "The Creep", "Threw It on the Ground", "Reba (Two Worlds Collide)", and "Great Day"). "We're Back!" premiered on Late Night with Jimmy Fallon. The CD version of the album also includes a DVD featuring some of the digital shorts. Collaborators on the album include Snoop Dogg, Akon, Rihanna, Justin Timberlake, Nicki Minaj, Michael Bolton, Santigold, John Waters, and Beck.

== Track listing ==
CD
No.	Title	Writer(s)	Producer(s)	Length
1.	"We're Back!"	Andy Samberg; Akiva Schaffer; Jorma Taccone; Brendan Long; Brandon Lamela	Villanova; B-Sides	1:50
2.	"Mama"	Samberg; Schaffer; J. Taccone	KnocDown	1:59
3.	"I Just Had Sex" (featuring Akon and DJ Frank E)	Samberg; Schaffer; J. Taccone; Justin Franks; Jerrod Bettis	DJ Frank E; SKINS	2:46
4.	"Jack Sparrow" (featuring Michael Bolton)	Samberg; Schaffer; J. Taccone; Michael Woods	Woods	3:07
5.	"Attracted to Us" (featuring Beck)	Samberg; Schaffer; J. Taccone; Beck Hansen; Cole Greif-Neill	Beck	1:52
6.	"Rocky"	Samberg; Schaffer; J. Taccone; Larry James Hamilton; Albert Savoy; Elijah Walker; Mark Potsic	DJ Nu-Mark	2:33
7.	"My Mic (Interlude)"	Samberg; Schaffer; J. Taccone	The Lonely Island	0:22
8.	"Turtleneck & Chain" (featuring Snoop Dogg)	Samberg; Schaffer; J. Taccone; Calvin Broadus; Jim Coleman	JMIKE	2:44
9.	"Shy Ronnie 2: Ronnie & Clyde" (featuring Rihanna)	Samberg; Schaffer; J. Taccone; Robyn Fenty; Tyler Williams	T-Minus	2:26
10.	"Trouble on Dookie Island"	Samberg; Schaffer; J. Taccone; Long; Lamela	Villanova	2:09
11.	"Falcor vs. Atreyu (Classy Skit #1)"	Samberg; Schaffer; J. Taccone	The Lonely Island	0:29
12.	"Motherlover" (featuring Justin Timberlake)	Samberg; Schaffer; J. Taccone; Drew Campbell; Asa Taccone; Justin Timberlake	Campbell; A. Taccone	2:49
13.	"The Creep" (featuring Nicki Minaj and John Waters)	Samberg; Schaffer; J. Taccone; Scott Jung	CHOPS	2:39
14.	"Watch Me Do Me (Classy Skit #2)"	Samberg; Schaffer; J. Taccone; Campbell	Campbell	0:27
15.	"Threw It On the Ground"	Samberg; Schaffer; J. Taccone; Campbell	Campbell	2:38
16.	"Japan"	Samberg; Schaffer; J. Taccone; Williams	T-Minus	2:30
17.	"After Party" (featuring Santigold)	Samberg; Schaffer; J. Taccone; M. Midttun	Sean Maxvel	2:52
18.	"No Homo"	Samberg; Schaffer; J. Taccone; B. Long; B. Byrd	B-Sides	2:02
19.	"No Homo Outro"	Willie Clarke; Clarence Reid	6th Sense	0:41

iTunes deluxe version bonus
No.	Title	Writer(s)	Producer(s)	Length
20.	"Reba (Two Worlds Collide)" (featuring Kenan Thompson)	Samberg; Schaffer; J. Taccone; Ilya Salmanzadeh	KnocDown	2:23

DVD
No.	Title	Length
1.	"We're Back!"
2.	"I Just Had Sex"
3.	"The Creep"
4.	"Motherlover"
5.	"Shy Ronnie 2: Ronnie & Clyde"
6.	"Threw It on the Ground"
7.	"We'll Kill U"
8.	"Reba (Two Worlds Collide)"
9.	"Great Day"

== Samples ==
- "We're Back!" contains a sample from "That's How It Is" performed by Laura Lee.
- "Rocky" contains a sample from "I Feel Like Dynamite" performed by King Floyd.
- "Trouble on Dookie Island" contains a sample from "Minna Darekao Aishiteiru" performed by The Hornets.
- "No Homo" contains a sample from "I'm Not to Blame" performed by Bobby Byrd.
- "No Homo Outro" contains a sample from "Girls Can't Do What Guys Do" performed by Betty Wright.
- "Shy Ronnie 2: Ronnie & Clyde" contains a sample from "In My Hood" performed by P. Reign.
- "My Mic (Interlude)" interpolates lyrics from "My Mic Sounds Nice" by Salt-N-Pepa.

== Charts ==
=== Weekly charts ===
Chart (2011)	Peak position
Australian Albums (ARIA)	15
Australian Urban Albums (ARIA)	5
New Zealand Albums (RMNZ)	40
UK Albums (Official Charts)	26
US Billboard 200	3
US Top Rap Albums (Billboard)	1

=== Year-end charts ===
Chart (2011)	Position
US Billboard 200	178
US Top Comedy Albums	1
US Top Rap Albums	22

== Certifications ==
Region	Certification	Certified units/sales
Denmark (IFPI Danmark)	Gold	10,000^{‡}
United Kingdom (BPI)	Silver	60,000^{‡}
^{‡} Sales+streaming figures based on certification alone.

== See also ==
- List of number-one rap albums of 2011 (U.S.)
