= I'm Back =

I'm Back may refer to:

- I'm Back (album), a 1998 album by James Brown
- I'm Back (film), a 2018 comedy directed by Luca Miniero
- "I'm Back", a song by Eminem from his album The Marshall Mathers LP
- "I'm Back" (song), a 2010 song by American rapper T.I.
- "I'm Back", a song by Monica from her album All Eyez on Me
- "I'm Back", a song by Ashley Tisdale from her album Guilty Pleasure
- "I'm Back", a song by Slim Thug from his album Boss of All Bosses
- "I'm Back", a song by The Box (1987)
- "I'm Back", a song by The Charmers (1964)
- "I'm Back", a song by Karrier (1984)
- "I'm Back", a song by Little Richard (1966)
- "I'm Back", a song by Sil Austin And His Orchestra (1958)
- "I'm Back", a song by Tommy Faia And The True Blue Facts (1968)
- "I'm Back", a song by Ile Kallio (1982)
- "I'm Back", a song by Girl in Red from I'm Doing It Again Baby! (2024)
- "I'm back", a variant of the Terminator's "I'll be back" phrase
- ”I’m back”, referring to Michael Jordan’s famous return to the NBA after playing baseball

== See also ==
- We're Back! (disambiguation)
