= Motherlover =

Single by the Lonely Island featuring Justin Timberlake

from the album Turtleneck & Chain
- Released: May 9, 2009 (broadcast); April 19, 2011 (single)
- Recorded: May 7–8, 2009
- Length: 2:49
- Label: Universal Republic
- Songwriters: Andy Samberg; Akiva Schaffer; Jorma Taccone; Drew Campbell; Asa Taccone; Justin Timberlake
- Producers: Drew Campbell; Asa Taccone

The Lonely Island singles chronology
| "We're Back!" (2011) | "Motherlover" (2009) | "Turtleneck & Chain" (2011) |

Justin Timberlake singles chronology
| "Winner" (2010) | "Motherlover" (2011) | "3-Way (The Golden Rule)" (2011) |

Music video
- "Motherlover" on YouTube

"Motherlover" is the first sequel to "Dick in a Box" by the Lonely Island, also featuring Justin Timberlake. It debuted on Saturday Night Live as an SNL Digital Short on May 9, 2009. The song finds the two ballad singers (played again by Andy Samberg and Timberlake) singing of their desire to give their single mothers (played by Patricia Clarkson and Susan Sarandon) a sexual experience with the other ballad singer as the ultimate tribute to Mother's Day. Set five months after the events of "Dick in a Box", the video opens with the balladeers being released from jail, only to be faced with the quandary of what to get their respective mothers for Mother's Day.

The short was an effort between the two artists during a sleepless week of writing, recording and shooting before it aired. The song was written by the Lonely Island (Samberg, Jorma Taccone, and Akiva Schaffer) with Timberlake on the Tuesday before the short's premiere. Samberg and Timberlake recorded the song in an all-night session two days later, with a 20-hour video shoot commencing the next day. Schaffer began editing the footage early Saturday morning and only completed the short within minutes of its broadcast debut, finalizing the video while the show was already live.

Released the day before Mother's Day 2009, the video was an immediate viral hit, in the same vein of its predecessor. The song was released as a single shortly before the release of the Lonely Island's sophomore record, Turtleneck & Chain.

The song has two versions, which were both praised by David Jeffries of AllMusic. In a Cracked look back at the sketch, writer Tim Grierson commends the outlandish premise for the combination of the characters' genuine compassion for their mothers' loneliness with "how confident they are that their moms will love this completely inappropriate gesture."

== Charts ==
=== Weekly charts ===
| Chart (2011) | Peak position |
|---|---|
| Sweden (Sverigetopplistan) | 18 |

=== Year-end charts ===
| Chart (2011) | Position |
|---|---|
| Sweden (Sverigetopplistan) | 60 |
