= I Used to Go Here =

2020 film by Kris Rey

- Release poster
- Directed by: Kris Rey
- Written by: Kris Rey
- Produced by: Jordan Yale Levine; Jordan Beckerman; Jonathan Duffy; Kelly Williams; Andy Samberg; Jorma Taccone; Becky Sloviter; Akiva Schaffer
- Starring: Gillian Jacobs; Josh Wiggins; Hannah Marks; Forrest Goodluck; Jorma Taccone; Kate Micucci; Zoë Chao; Jemaine Clement
- Cinematography: Nate Hurtsellers
- Edited by: Zach Clark
- Music by: Curtis Heath
- Production companies: Myriad Pictures; Party Over Here; Yale Productions
- Distributed by: Gravitas Ventures
- Release date: August 7, 2020
- Running time: 86 minutes
- Country: United States
- Language: English
- Box office: $23,898

I Used to Go Here is a 2020 American comedy-drama film written and directed by Kris Rey. It stars Gillian Jacobs, Josh Wiggins, Hannah Marks, Forrest Goodluck, Jorma Taccone, Kate Micucci, Zoë Chao, and Jemaine Clement. The film follows Kate Conklin (Jacobs), a first-time novelist who returns to her alma mater for a reading 15 years after graduating and becomes involved with the lives of the current students. It was released in select theaters and on video on demand in the United States on August 7, 2020, by Gravitas Ventures.

== Plot ==
Chicago writer Kate Conklin's engagement is called off at the same time the tour for her debut novel is canceled due to poor sales. Shortly afterwards, her former professor and mentor David Kirkpatrick invites her to do a reading at her alma mater, the fictitious Illinois University in Carbondale, Illinois.

Returning to Carbondale, Kate is surprised to be staying at a bed and breakfast (B&B) across from the house she lived in while at university. The host is an assertive woman, Mrs. Beeter, who gives her one set of keys and insists they will not be replaced. She meets the current occupants, three boys named Hugo, Tall Brandon, and Animal, who allow her to visit her former room. She tells them she nicknamed the house the Writers' Retreat. They tell her the name is still used, which she finds flattering. They invite her to the party they are having there that night.

After her reading, Kirkpatrick offers Kate a teaching position, which she mulls over. Kate loses the keys to the B&B and Mrs. Beeter refuses to replace them. Walking home late and finding herself locked out, she sees a number of students at the party across the street, and decides to join them. While there, she receives a text message from her former fiancé, asking her not to contact him anymore. Animal and his girlfriend Emma end up comforting her, and they allow her to stay over at the house.

The next day, while consulting with writing students in a coffee shop, Kate meets with April, one of Kirkpatrick's students and Hugo's girlfriend. April is a rising star in the English department, and when Kate tries to give her some professional advice to make her writing more marketable, she is surprised to have her suggestions rejected. Meanwhile, The New York Times gives Kate's book a negative review.

Returning to her former residence, Kate learns that April has dumped Hugo. The others suspect that she was cheating with Professor Kirkpatrick. Kate, Hugo, Tall Brandon, Animal, and Emma go to Kirkpatrick's house to try to verify the cheating rumors. They walk in on April and Kirkpatrick in bed together. After serving the students refreshments, Kirkpatrick tells Kate that he and his wife have an open relationship. Kate is disappointed by his actions, though, and further disappointed to learn that he has lied about reading her book. She declines the teaching position he offered her.

Kate and her student friends return to the house. When Kate tells Hugo she has been locked out of her B&B, he offers to let her stay in his room, her former room. He tells her he admires an essay she wrote about her deceased brother when she was a student there, and the two have sex.

As Kate sneaks out of the house the following morning, she runs into April, who is presumably arriving to see Hugo, and who deduces that Kate has slept with him. Kate apologizes to her for not encouraging her work, and admits that her feelings of failure and jealousy prevented her from being more supportive. She heads back to the B&B where she eats breakfast, witnessing a softer side to Mrs. Beeter. Her best friend and former housemate Laura also calls and tells her she is in labor.

On the drive to the airport, Kate's driver tells her he read and loved her book. When he asks her how the experience of being published has been for her, Kate replies that "it could be better".

== Cast ==
- Gillian Jacobs as Kate Conklin
- Jemaine Clement as David Kirkpatrick
- Josh Wiggins as Hugo Gaffney
- Forrest Goodluck as Animal Springstine
- Hannah Marks as April Barnhardt
- Kate Micucci as Rachel Gaffney
- Zoë Chao as Laura
- Jorma Taccone as Bradley Cooper
- Khloe Janel as Emma
- Brandon Daley as Tall Brandon
- Rammel Chan as Elliot
- Cindy Gold as Mrs. Beeter
- Kristina Valada-Viars as Alexis

== Production ==
In August 2019, it was announced Gillian Jacobs, Jemaine Clement, Hannah Marks, Forrest Goodluck, Josh Wiggins, Kate Micucci, Jorma Taccone, and Zoë Chao had joined the cast of the film, with Kris Rey directing from a screenplay she wrote. The film was shot in Chicago and Carbondale, Illinois.

== Release ==
I Used to Go Here was scheduled to have its world premiere at South by Southwest on March 14, 2020; however, the festival was canceled due to the COVID-19 pandemic. Shortly afterwards, Gravitas Ventures acquired North American distribution rights to the film and released it in select theaters and on video on demand in the United States on August 7, 2020. It began streaming on HBO Max on December 20, 2020.

== Reception ==
On the review aggregator website Rotten Tomatoes, the film holds an approval rating of 84% based on 77 reviews, with an average rating of 6.8/10. The website's critics consensus reads: "Elevated significantly by Gillian Jacobs' central performance, I Used to Go Here tells a familiar story with considerable charm." Metacritic, which uses a weighted average, assigned the film a score of 68 out of 100, based on 18 critics, indicating "generally favorable" reviews.

The A.V. Club's Katie Rife gave the film a "B", noting Jacobs' performance and smart joke writing as key strengths, with some unevenness in tone that does not match all of Rey's strengths.
