= Dick in a Box =

2009 single by the Lonely Island featuring Justin Timberlake

Single by the Lonely Island featuring Justin Timberlake

from the album Incredibad
- Released: January 27, 2009
- Recorded: December 14, 2006
- Genre: R&B; Christmas
- Length: 2:41
- Label: Universal Republic
- Songwriters: Andy Samberg; Akiva Schaffer; Jorma Taccone; Asa Taccone; Justin Timberlake; Katreese Barnes
- Producers: Jorma Taccone; Asa Taccone; Katresse Barnes

The Lonely Island singles chronology
"Jizz in My Pants" (2008)	"Dick in a Box" (2009)	"I'm on a Boat" (2009)

Justin Timberlake singles chronology
"Follow My Lead" (2009)	"Dick in a Box" (2009)	"Hallelujah" (2010)

"Dick in a Box" (censored as "D*** in a Box") is a song by the American comedy trio the Lonely Island featuring American singer Justin Timberlake. The trio—Andy Samberg, Akiva Schaffer, and Jorma Taccone—co-wrote the song with Timberlake, Katreese Barnes, and Asa Taccone. Barnes and Asa Taccone co-produced it with Jorma Taccone. Saturday Night Live (SNL) creator and producer Lorne Michaels asked Samberg to write a musical sketch for the 2006 Christmas episode with Timberlake, who was returning as both a host and musical guest. Samberg developed the concept with other members of the group before working with Timberlake on December 14. They recorded the track around midnight and spent the next day and a half filming the corresponding music video.

The sketch depicts two early-1990s R&B singers, played by Samberg and Timberlake, singing a holiday song about making a Christmas gift for their girlfriends: their penises in boxes. The sketch premiered on SNL as a Digital Short, a series of comedic short films created for the show, on December 16, 2006. The word "dick" was bleeped 16 times following an agreement with the Federal Communications Commission (FCC). SNL producers published an uncensored version of the sketch online right after its broadcast debut, making them the first scripted comedy show on a broadcast network to use the internet to avoid FCC control over its explicit content.

On January 27, 2009, "Dick in a Box" was released digitally as a single through Universal Republic Records and included on the Lonely Island's debut studio album, Incredibad, released on February 10. The song went viral on the internet and received praise from television and music critics for its raunchy humor and Timberlake's performance. It has been recognized retrospectively as the Lonely Island's signature song and one of the best Christmas-themed SNL sketches. The track won the Primetime Emmy Award for Outstanding Original Music and Lyrics in 2007, and appeared on the Australian and Canadian song charts in 2009. Samberg and Timberlake reprised their roles in two Digital Shorts sequels, "Motherlover" (2009) and "3-Way (The Golden Rule)" (2011).

== Writing and recording ==
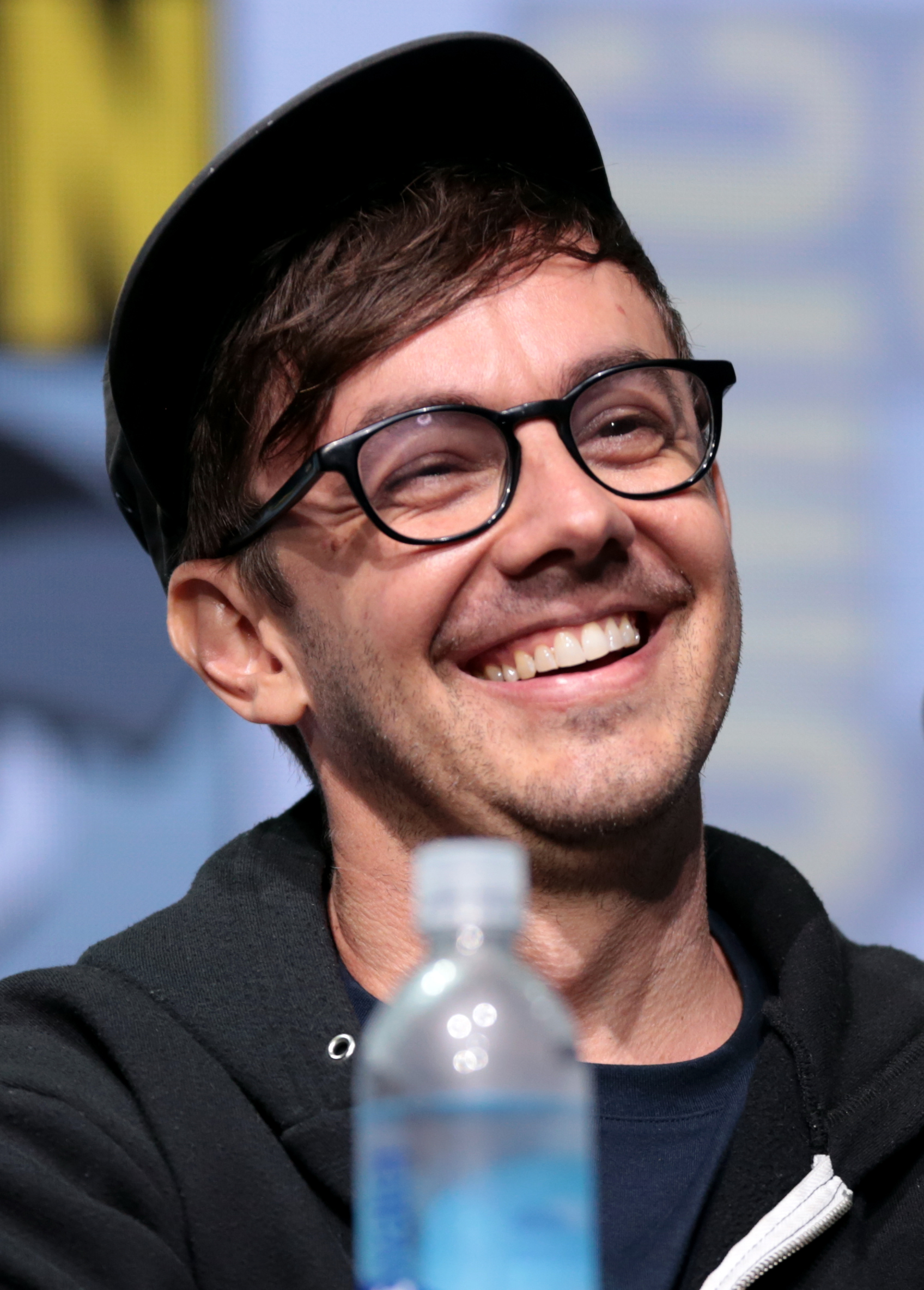
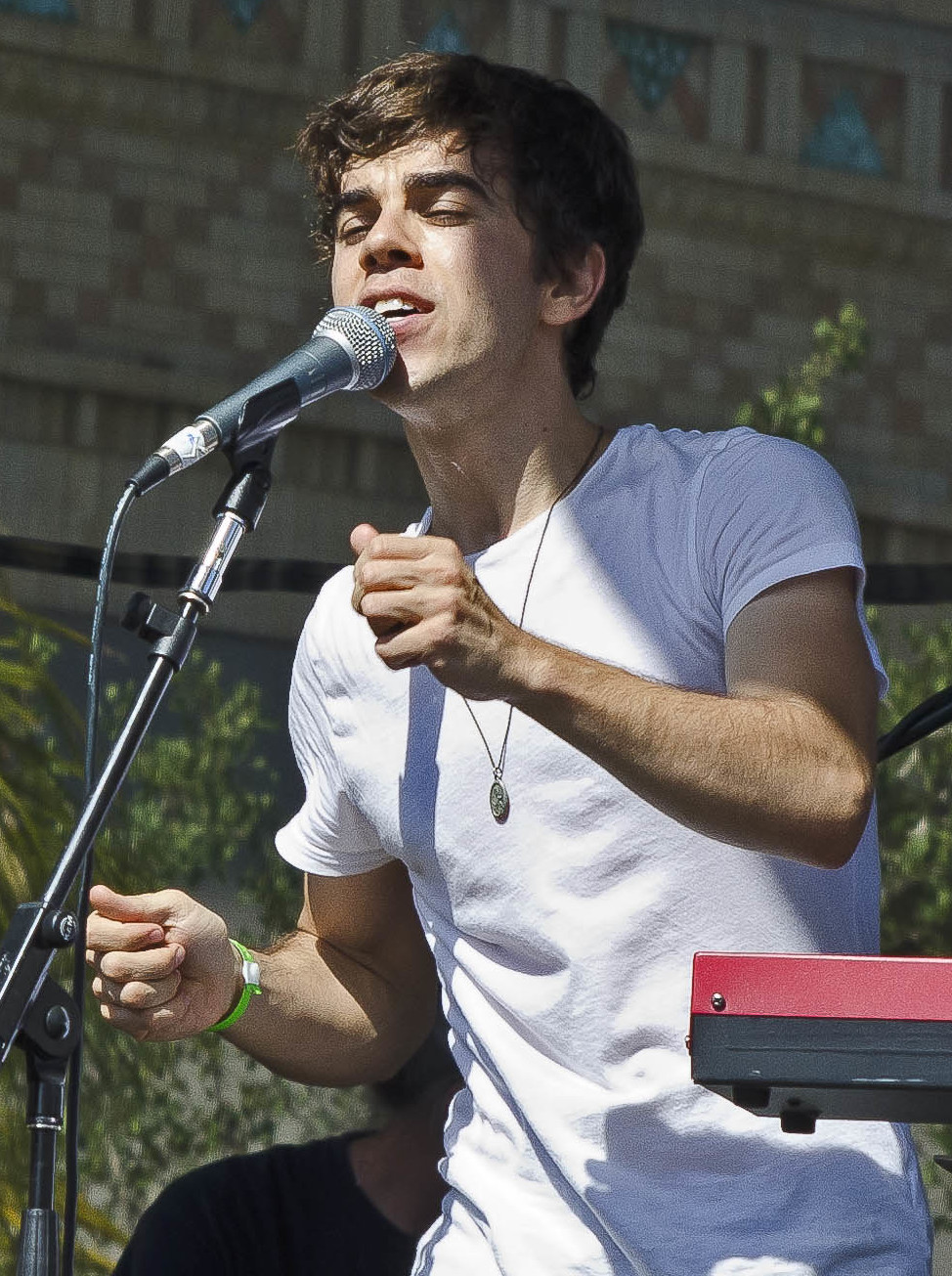
Jorma Taccone (left, pictured in 2017) and his brother Asa (right, pictured in 2012) co-wrote and co-produced the song with music director Katreese Barnes.

Justin Timberlake first appeared on SNL as a musical guest in 2000, performing as a member of the American boy band NSYNC. In late November 2006, Timberlake announced his return to SNL for the December 16 episode as a host and musical guest. On December 12, when Timberlake was on track to host SNL for the second time, creator and executive producer Lorne Michaels asked Samberg to try writing a funny skit to showcase Timberlake's singing skills. Although the writing team originally came up with a different idea, Michaels insisted they use more of Timberlake's musical side. Inspired by the music they grew up listening to, members of the Lonely Island wanted to write an early-1990s R&B song that was similar to the work of Jodeci, R. Kelly, the Isley Brothers, LeVert, and H-Town. That night, they contacted associate music director Katreese Barnes to help them work on the song; she was later credited as a songwriter and producer. Samberg felt the concept of imitating a 1990s-style band was "a perfect fit" for Timberlake, who was a member of a boy band.

The concept of the track was not decided until December 14, when Jorma came up with the "dick in a box" premise. Once the trio agreed the concept was funny enough, they presented a rough draft of the song to Timberlake. A fan of 1990s-style music, Timberlake immediately accepted the song. He was the only one who was confident about the sketch. The trio was having doubts about the crass joke and the bygone musical concept. Timberlake felt it was important to make the song "really singable" and suggested changes to "Dick in a Box". He came up with the hook and the line "Mid-day at the grocery store", while adding pauses to make the song more catchy. Schaffer suggested adding the three steps of making the box into the lyrics. Samberg, who was feeling nervous when working on the idea with Timberlake, said the singer "took the reigns [sic] and schooled [them] on how to record and make it sound fantastic". The writers finished writing the lyrics within two hours.

Like other SNL sketches, "Dick in a Box" was recorded and produced in a very short time. Samberg and Timberlake recorded their voice track for two hours around midnight on December 14–15, right after finishing the lyrics. They used special equipment, including a $500 microphone, in Samberg's office. Timberlake recalled the crew was laughing frantically during the production and that the "delirium of no sleep" contributed to the song's humor. Although Samberg's voice cracked a few times, Timberlake's easygoing attitude made him more relaxed throughout the recording session. Asa Taccone, Jorma's brother, worked on the track in Los Angeles while the other writers were in New York City. Initially, Jorma gave his brother the specific outline of the track for him to work with, which Asa described as a "cheesy, 90s, Color Me Badd type track". Asa then sent the writers instrumental tracks and went through each beat with them during phone calls. He was nervous working with Timberlake and felt the process was chaotic because of the limited work time. "It was semi-terrifying having [Timberlake] listen to my stuff. I was a kid back then. I'm sure the stuff I was playing was mostly terrible", Asa said.

== Composition ==
"Dick in a Box" is an R&B song with a runtime of two minutes and 41 seconds. According to Universal Music Publishing Group's digital sheet music for the song, it is composed in the key of C minor and set in common time signature, with a moderately slow groove of 80 beats per minute. The vocals span two octaves, from C♯_{4} up to C♯_{6}. Music critics compared the track to the work of Color Me Badd, noting the song's spoken-word breakdown and the way the last syllables of the refrain go increasingly up. Critics also found the track was influenced by American groups New Kids on the Block, Hall & Oates, and Backstreet Boys.

David Jeffries of AllMusic described "Dick in a Box" as an imitation of teen pop, while Stephen Saito of Premiere called the slow jam "an ode to the phallic present for all occasions". Chris Mincher of The A.V. Club and Stuart McGurk of GQ viewed it as a midtempo synth rock track that soundtracks a rapidly unfolding horror. "Dick in a Box" has been described as a Christmas song by critics, including Mincher, who highlighted its release in the SNL Christmas special. Ross Bonaime of Paste referred to it as a hybrid between "a Christmas song, a '90s R&B parody and a joke about bad gift giving". Believing the sketch qualified as a Christmas film, Matthew Dessem of Slate pointed out that the Christmas setting and the theme surrounding Christmas presents, as well as the non-Christmas holidays mentioned in the song, all take place around Christmas.

== Premise and themes ==
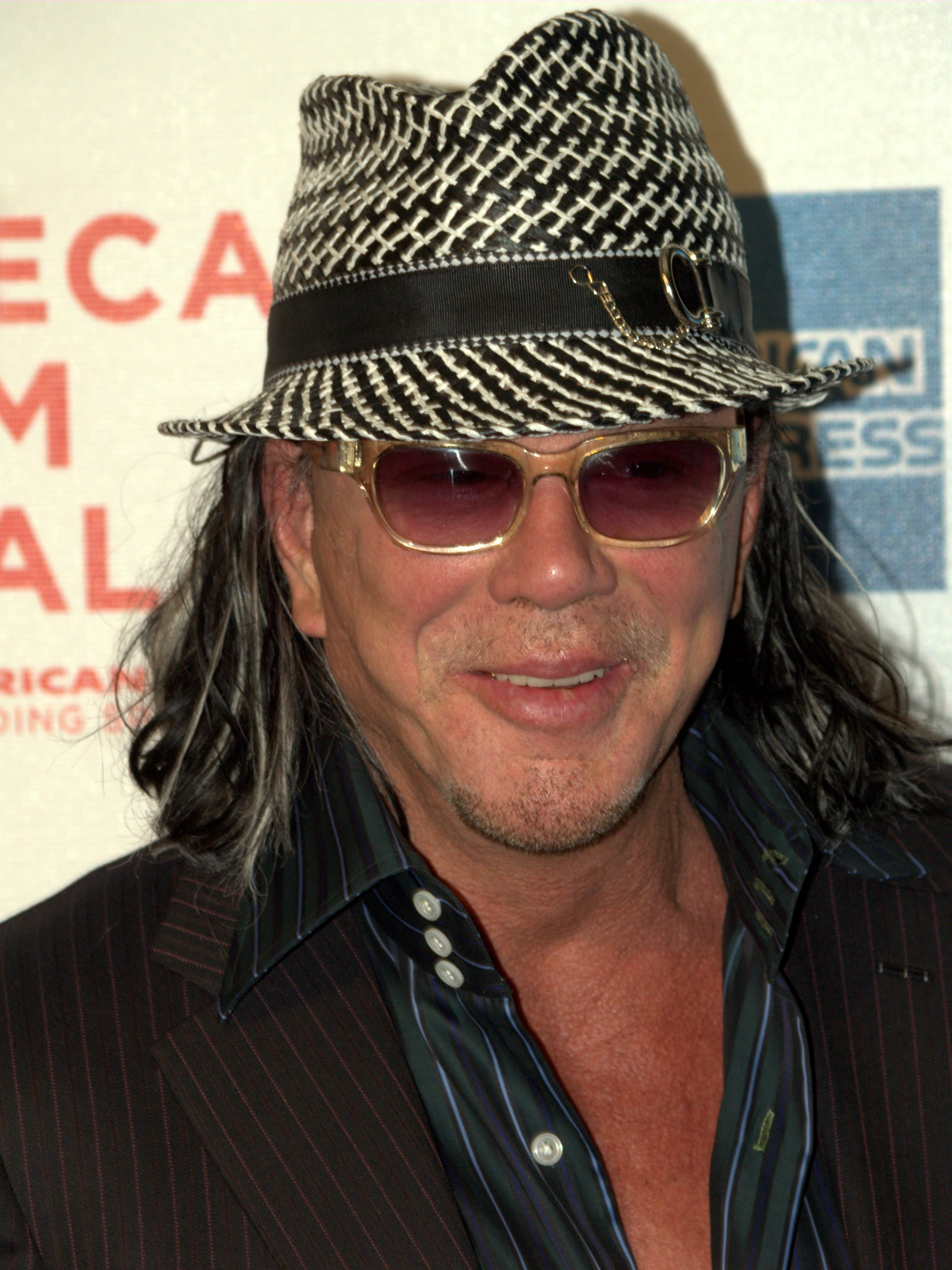
The sketch's premise was partly inspired by a similar act performed by Mickey Rourke (pictured in 2009) in Barry Levinson's Diner (1982)

The music that the Lonely Island grew up listening to inspired "Dick in a Box". They wanted to make a parody of the members of a 1990s R&B group, who were still stuck in that era. It follows the tone of other songs by the Lonely Island, which focus on mundane characters who express themselves aggressively about their daily lives. Timberlake and Samberg named their duo 2:30 am, after what the former described as when "really strong lovemaking" begins. Despite referring to early-1990s R&B music, Timberlake said the sketch was not "parodying anyone in particular".

Timberlake explained the premise, where the characters genuinely give their genitalia as Christmas presents to their lovers, aimed for comedic effect, while making the characters even more ridiculous. He thought initially the idea was creepy, but still pursued it. The premise was based on dick jokes and some men's habit of putting their penises in unusual things. "It's nothing new. Guys have been putting their dicks in boxes since caveman days", Schaffer said. Despite not trying it himself, Samberg had heard stories from other people doing similar things with bad results. Jorma said a scene in the 1982 Barry Levinson film Diner, in which Mickey Rourke's character tricks his date into groping him by placing his penis inside a box of popcorn at a movie theater, also inspired the premise. An identical act can be found in a scene of La Boum (1980), directed by Claude Pinoteau. Mincher felt the act was "so absurd (and unexpectedly raunchy) that few watching it live could see it coming".

Critics have offered various interpretations of "Dick in a Box". Penny Spirou in Music in Comedy Television: Notes on Laughs (2017) and Virginia Heffernan of The New York Times viewed the sketch as a satire of "the bad faith of the pandering R&B foreplay songs", which was made to trick a woman's desire for comfort, until she "opens that nicely wrapped present". Heffernan also linked the content to Timberlake's public image in the 2000s, saying, "He's all sweet, but he gets what he wants. And no one, not even Janet Jackson, stands in his way... [The audiences] have decided, for now, that he's cooler than they thought". Terry Gross of Fresh Air opined that the sketch is a parody of narcissism, in which the characters suggest "the greatest gift [a man] could give to a lady is a very special lovemaking". She noted the singers emphasize "how great he is, not how much he loves his girlfriend, but really how much he loves himself". Mincher argued that besides the joke about men's obsession with their own genitalia, the sketch pokes fun at men's gift-giving mistakes. A man believes he is the greatest present his girlfriend could receive, implying that a woman should provide sexual favors for her man. He dismisses more expensive presents as superficial. Mincher suggests the sketch is a product of fantasy detached from the reality of relationships.

== Release ==
The video for "Dick in a Box" was sent to NBC executive Rick Ludwin after the raw editing had been finished at 4:00 pm on December 16. The Federal Communications Commission (FCC) took issue with the actors saying "dick" on-air and wanted to stop the sketch's screening. SNL producers agreed with the FCC that the song could be aired with the word bleeped out. However, since the FCC has no jurisdiction over the content on the internet, the producers asked Ludwin to make the uncensored version available online. Ludwin, who was initially hesitant about the idea, watched the footage with a representative from the NBC legal department. He found the sketch funny and realized that those searching on the internet specifically for the video would not be upset by its content. He sought final approval for the uncensored sketch from Kevin Reilly, the president of NBC Entertainment, and Jeff Zucker, the chief executive of NBCUniversal Television Group—both of whom approved the idea. Editing continued on the video for the rest of the day, in time for its television debut.

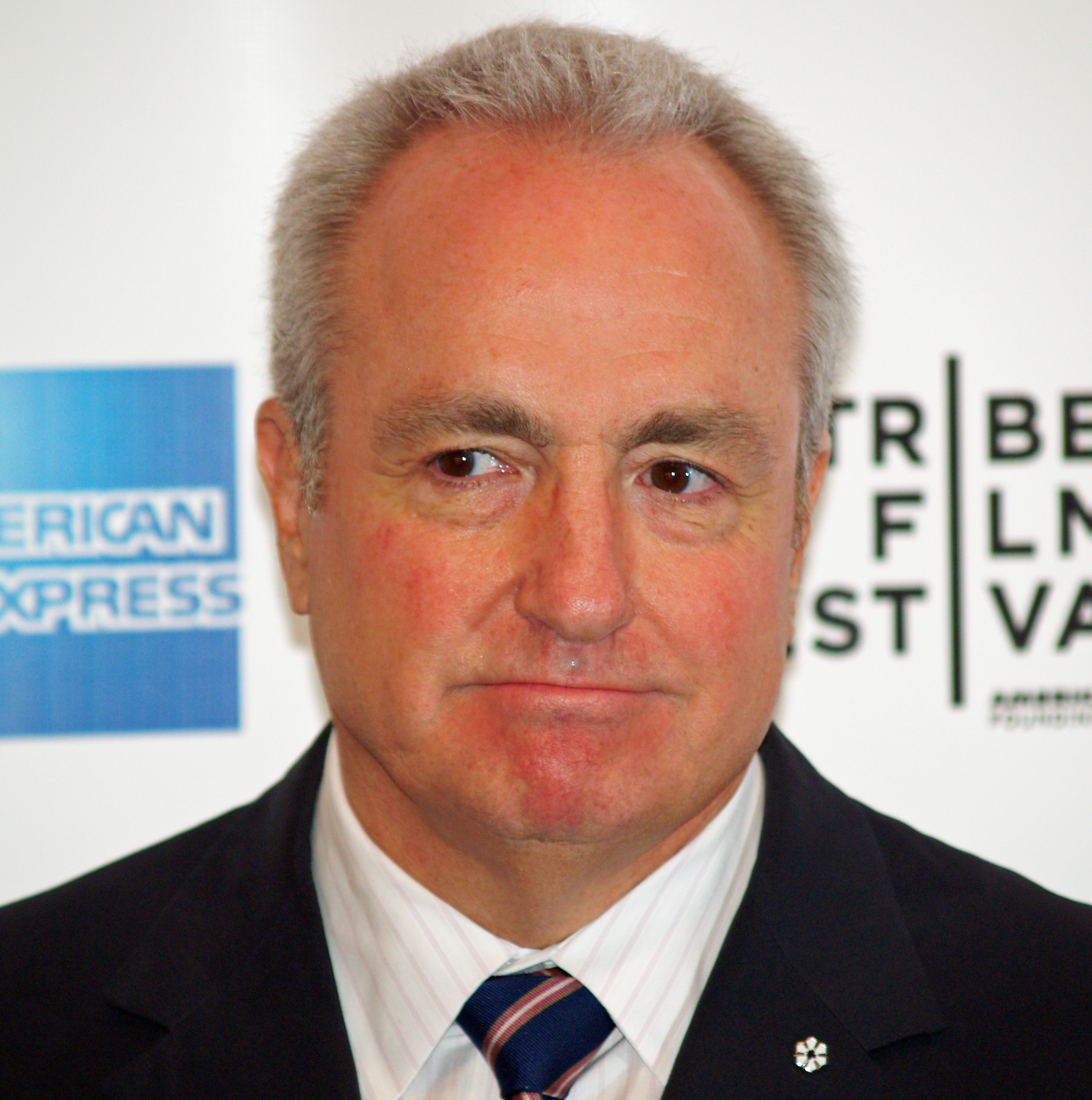
Lorne Michaels (pictured in 2008), who originally asked Samberg to write the sketch, expressed his approval towards its uncensored online release

"Dick in a Box" premiered as a Digital Short on the Christmas episode of the 32nd season of SNL, which aired on December 16, 2006. NBC bleeped the word "dick" 16 times as agreed with the FCC. After the broadcast concluded at 1:00 am ET on December 17, both the censored and uncensored versions of the sketch were made available on NBC's website and YouTube channel, under the heading "Special Treat in a Box" or "Special Christmas Box". A cautionary warning was shown at the beginning of the unbleeped version, while viewers had to affirm they were over 18 to access the video. Besides the official video uploaded by NBC, bootleg copies of the clip were being removed from YouTube at the network's request.

The release made SNL the first scripted comedy show on a broadcast network to use the internet to avoid FCC control over its explicit content. On December 21, the media advocacy group Parents Television Council (PTC) called on NBC and asked the network to explain the decision to post both versions of the song online. L. Brent Bozell III, the president of the PTC, said that the video is "a new low for NBC" and the online release "is blatantly irresponsible and unacceptable". In an interview published by The New York Times the same day, Michaels said that posting the equivalent of a "director's cut" of his late-night show on the internet "will be the exception" in the future. He believed other shows and networks were likely to follow NBC's lead in making inappropriate-for-TV material available online, saying, "Now that the door has been opened, some things will go through it".

Days after "Dick in a Box" was released, Samberg expressed his interest in creating an album full of comedy hip-hop and R&B songs. "It's something we've always wanted to do and we've been working on putting it together", Samberg said. Universal Republic released the album, titled Incredibad, on February 10, 2009. The album included 14 new tracks that the trio recorded while living together in Encino, Los Angeles, during the summer of 2009. "Dick in a Box" was one of five SNL Digital Shorts on the album, with "Lazy Sunday", "Natalie's Rap", "Ras Trent", and "Space Olympics". This was made possible because of the partnership between NBC and Broadway Video that gave Universal Republic the rights to release these videos. It was the first time these sketches had been released without a laugh track. "We spend so much time getting stuff to sound good... but nobody has ever really heard a clean version of those songs", Jorma said. Before the album's release, the lead single "Jizz in My Pants" was broadcast and released digitally in December 2008, followed by the first-ever digital release of "Dick in a Box" on iTunes and Amazon on January 27, 2009. (Note: The release date for "Dick in a Box" on iTunes Store was incorrectly given as January 1, 2009.) "Dick in a Box" later appeared on the Saturday Night Live – The Best of '06–'07 extra DVD, released in March 2008.

== Public reaction ==
The SNL episode received a 5.3/13 Nielsen rating/share in the 18–49 demographic and attracted seven million American viewers during its initial broadcast, one of the show's highest ratings for a Christmas episode. (Note: "Rating" represents the percentage of American households with a television watching an episode during any given minute of its broadcast while "share" represents the percentage of American households with a television in use watching an episode during any given minute of its broadcast.) According to the New York Daily News, less than a week after its online release, the uncensored version of the sketch had been viewed over 320,000 times on NBC's website and 3.5 million times on YouTube. Thanks to a partnership between NBC and YouTube, the video quickly became one of the 20 most-viewed on the site and one of the quickest viral hits of 2006. It generated 7.5 million views in one week at the end of December. According to online video analytics site Vidmeter, there were at least 18 identical copies of "Dick in a Box" posted to various YouTube and Google Video accounts, bringing the total views to over 20 million by February 2007.

The official uncensored video garnered more than 15,000 comments and 28 million views (34.9 million views when combined with other versions) before NBC took down its YouTube channel in preparation for the launch of Hulu on October 21. On December 23, 2008, "Dick in a Box" appeared at number nine on the Guardian Viral Video Chart: Christmas Special showing the year's top viral videos, compiled by The Guardian and viralvideochart.com. An official video of the sketch was uploaded again on YouTube in December 2018, which had garnered 5.5 million views by April 2020. Following its release as a digital single in January 2009, "Dick in a Box" debuted at number 82 on the Canadian Hot 100 and number 48 on the Billboard Canadian Digital Song Sales chart. Both were the Lonely Island's first entries on the charts. In late June, the single peaked at number 61 on the Australian Singles Chart, the third track from Incredibad to appear on the chart after the top 10 entries "Jizz in My Pants" and "I'm on a Boat" (2009). In January 2011, "Dick in a Box" peaked at number eight on the Billboard Comedy Digital Track Sales chart.

Following the rebroadcast of "Dick in a Box" on SNL, the FCC received complaints from viewers about the sketch. A report in The Atlantic showed that "Dick in a Box" and "Djesus Uncrossed", a 2013 parody of Django Unchained starring Christoph Waltz, were the most frequent targets of complaint letters sent to the FCC about SNL by viewers from 2012 to 2015. Most of the letters were suspicious of Timberlake's appearance after his part in the 2004 Super Bowl XXXVIII halftime show controversy with Janet Jackson, in which he ripped off part of her outfit, momentarily exposing her right breast on live television.

== Critical reception ==
Annie Wu of TV Squad was "laughing [her] head off" while watching the sketch and was impressed with Timberlake's performance. Caroline Palmer of Broadcasting & Cable wrote that Timberlake and Samberg had "given new meaning to 'giving of yourself' and 'package' with the perfect gift for that special someone". Both Wu and Palmer were confused about the sketch's title and content during the broadcast. Palmer called the censored version pointless. Gilbert Cruz of Entertainment Weekly thought the sketch was a nice way "to cap off what has been a fantastic year for [Timberlake]" and suggested SNL should focus more on the Digital Shorts. Tom Hall of IndieWire praised the Digital Short as the highlight of the show, while News & Review's Mark Lore felt the track was Timberlake's best work since "Rock Your Body" (2003). Writing for New York magazine, Adam Sternbergh described it as "by far the most hilarious Timberlake–starring, Kwanzaa-referencing, Color Me Badd–parodying, 'put your junk in that box'–instructing short video you will ever see".

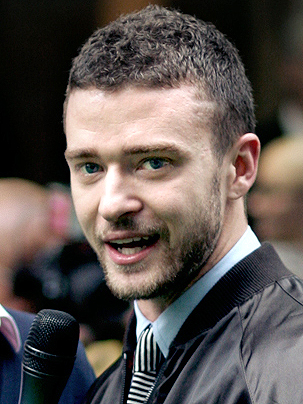
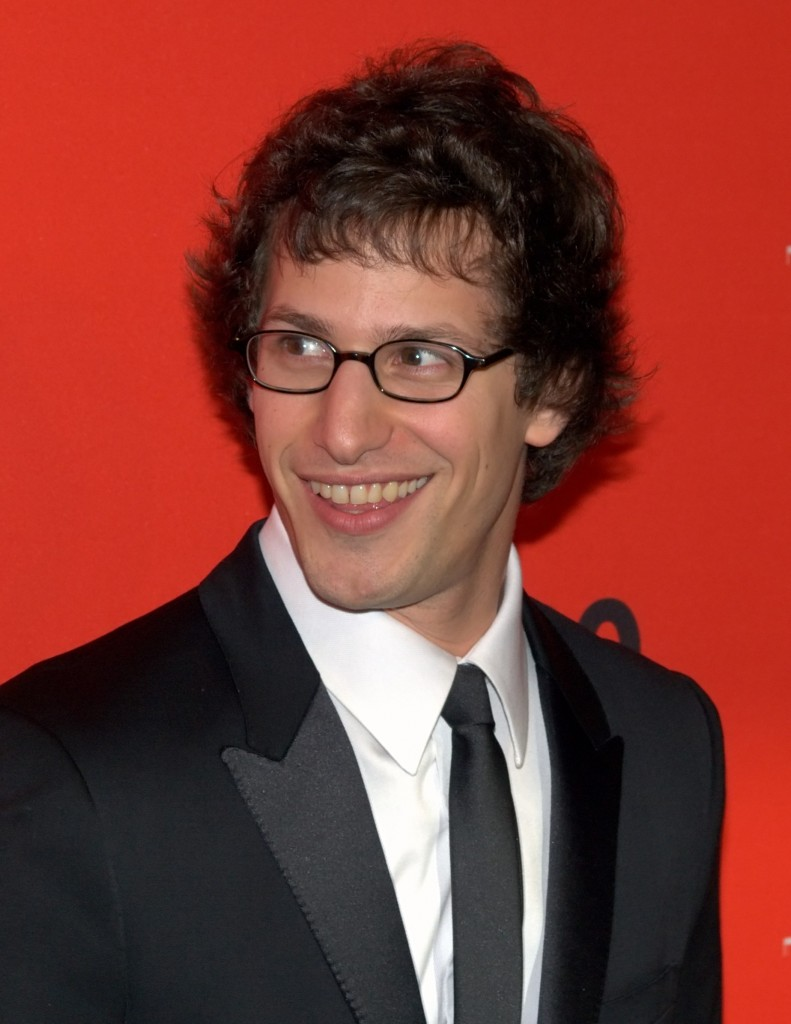
Timberlake (left, pictured in 2007) and Samberg's (right, pictured in 2010) performances received critical acclaim. They reprised their roles in two more SNL Digital Shorts in 2009 and 2011.

Larry Carroll of IGN called the song "the closest to 'Lazy Sunday' that we've seen yet". He praised the "dead-on spoof of that musical time period" and Wiig's brief cameo, and concluded, "Mr. Timberlake brought a very special package to us all this year, and he didn't even have it attached to his crotch". Heffernan said that Timberlake "[sealed] his triumph when he managed to score a cherished asset: a holiday classic". She commended the joke as both mindless fun and imaginative. Critics chose the sketch as the funniest moment of the episode, including Larry Carroll, Matt Dentler of IndieWire, and a writer from Rap-Up. In TV Squad, Joel Keller picked the sketch as one of the best television moments in 2006, while Brian Zoromski of IGN listed the sketch as his favorite Digital Short and the most memorable moment of the year on SNL.

Critics have recognized retrospectively that "Dick in a Box" is one of the best Christmas-themed SNL sketches. Bonaime wrote that the sketch is cheerfully egotistical and "might be the pinnacle of the Digital Short's success". Reviewing for VH1, Tara Aquino labeled the track as "The Christmas Song" for millennials that should "make its way to every station come December 1st". Writing for Vanity Fair, Eric Spitznagel wrote that the track is as recognizable as Steve Martin's "King Tut" (1978). Jody Rosen of Vulture commended the track as a "sublime cultural artifact that deserves to be in the next time capsule that NASA shoots off toward Jupiter". Entertainment Weekly's Hillary Busis ranked the track as Timberlake's best moment on SNL, calling it hilarious and "largely responsible for Timberlake's stellar hosting reputation". Billboard hailed it as one of the show's best musical moments, along with "Lazy Sunday". Rolling Stone listed the skit at number three on their 50 Greatest Saturday Night Live Sketches of All Time list, calling it Timberlake's best song post-FutureSex/LoveSounds.

On July 19, 2007, it was announced that "Dick in a Box" had received a nomination for a Primetime Emmy Award for Outstanding Original Music and Lyrics. Other nominees in the category included "My Drunken Irish Dad" (from Family Guy), "Merry Ex-Mas" (from MADtv), "Everything Comes Down to Poo", and "Guy Love" (the latter two from Scrubs). The songwriters of "Dick in a Box" won the award at the 59th Primetime Creative Arts ceremony on September 8. The song was credited for setting a precedent for more explicit material to earn nominations and win in the Emmy music-related categories.

== Music video ==
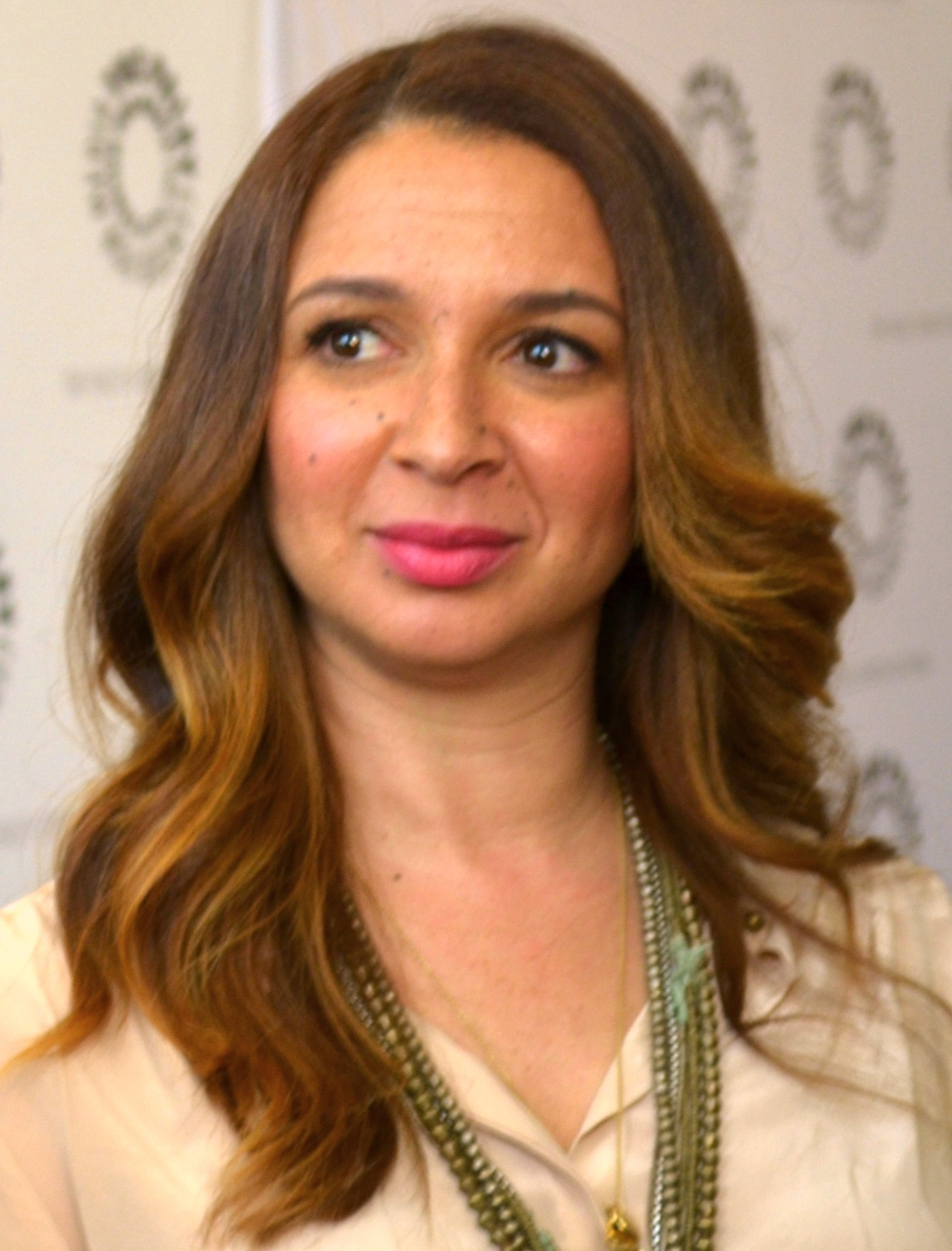
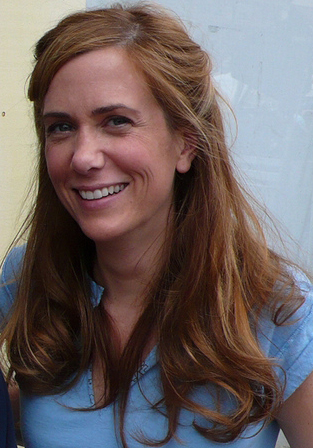
Actresses Maya Rudolph (left, pictured in 2012) and Kristen Wiig (right, pictured in 2009) played the love interests in the video.

After listening to the finished audio track, Barnes felt it would "be a big hit" if they had an equally funny video for it. The music video for "Dick in a Box" was filmed in New York City in a day and a half. The crew spent December 15 filming the video. Timberlake left occasionally to prepare for the show; they finished the session at 3:00 am the following morning. Schaffer directed the video with Jorma's assistance. Indoor scenes were filmed in Studio 8H, SNL's permanent set. Timberlake and Samberg sported wigs and fake short beards for the video.

Schaffer felt the filming process was both frightening and funny, saying, "We knew it was a really dumb idea and we weren't sure if we were even gonna get away with it on the air, but once we were actually making it, it was just super fun!" Members of the Lonely Island wanted to do the filming as quickly as they could, since Timberlake was busy with other hosting gigs and sketches. Actresses Kristen Wiig and Maya Rudolph played the duo's lovers. Wiig felt the song would be a hit after hearing it and seeing the film set. It was not until 4:00 pm on December 16, less than eight hours before it was to go live, that the video was ready to be shown to NBC executive Rick Ludwin.

The video begins with Samberg and Rudolph sitting in front of a fireplace. Samberg says he has a Christmas gift for her and instructs her to "just sit down and listen". The balladeers are wearing silk suits, jewel-toned rayon shirts, herringbone chains, trimmed goatees, and sunglasses. The men each give their lovers a box with their penis inside as a present, and ask them to open it and look inside. The singers stroke their goatees and pose with each displaying a gift-wrapped box attached to his groin. Their girlfriends seem aroused and excited by their presents, while the men aggressively rub roses and feathers in the women's faces. Near the chorus, the men sing about how their presents are better than other gifts, such as diamond rings, fancy cars, or luxury houses. The duo suggests their present is suitable for all holidays, including Christmas, Hanukkah, and Kwanzaa. At one point, they give step-by-step instructions on how to create the gift.

It's easy to do, just follow these steps:
1. Cut a hole in a box.
2. Put your junk in that box.
3. Make her open the box.
And that's the way you do it.

The video cuts frequently to scenes of Samberg and Timberlake dancing and singing on the West Side of Manhattan in Hudson River Park, including on a pier and on a basketball court, where Timberlake is seen hanging from a basketball hoop with a gift box on his crotch. At the end of the video, the men sing about giving the present on multiple occasions—at their parents' houses, the grocery store, and backstage at the Country Music Association Awards—while being arrested by the New York City Police Department (NYPD), presumably for indecent exposure.

== Live performances and usage in media ==
On February 7, 2007, Timberlake and Samberg gave a surprise performance of "Dick in a Box" for the first time at Madison Square Garden during Timberlake's concert tour, FutureSex/LoveShow. The duo sang in front of a sold-out stadium of 18,000 people. They performed the track as an encore, beginning with an announcer introducing them as a new band that had "the most-watched video on YouTube". The singers wore the characters' costumes and facial hair from the sketch, with a gift box attached below the belt. Samberg changed the holiday lyrics to "Valentine's Day... Flag Day... Kwanzaa", while Timberlake was giggling as he delivered the deadpan lines. At one point, Timberlake fell on his knee and sang the line "All across America, a dick in a box". After the song, Timberlake came back onstage and apologized, "I'm sorry if I offended some of you, but I could not resist".

Billboard felt the surprise performance "was hilarious if wholly unnecessary". Caryn Ganz of MTV wrote that the singers struggled with the nasal vocal performance and the song "landed a bit awkwardly in context". Ganz, however, noted that the audience "went truly berserk" with the performance. Amelia McDonell-Parry of Rolling Stone wrote that "Samberg hardly has the pipes to fill an arena, but no one seemed to mind". Timberlake, who was absent during the Primetime Creative Arts ceremony on September 8, celebrated after being notified of his Emmy win by performing a piano rendition of the song at the Tacoma Dome, Washington. Samberg was willing to perform "Dick in a Box" with Timberlake at the main 59th Primetime Emmy Awards ceremony, held in Los Angeles on September 16. The Emmy Awards producers were reportedly unsure about airing the explicit content and asked the duo to come up with a more family-friendly version of the track. The singers rejected the idea, and the performance was canceled. In February 2025, Samberg performed "Dick in a Box" with Lady Gaga during SNL's Homecoming Concert, a special musical event in celebration of the show's 50th anniversary.

The online release of "Dick in a Box" resulted in many users filming response videos on YouTube, in which they either present their own gift box or give instructions on how to do the box. Leah Kauffman, who was a Temple University student, wrote and recorded a parody from the female perspective of the sketch, titled "My Box in a Box". The track's music video showed a woman lip-syncing to Kauffman's vocals and dancing around with a gift-wrapped box in front of her crotch. The video had attracted more than three million views by January 2007. American band Umphrey's McGee covered "Dick in a Box" as an encore on December 31, 2006, at the Aragon Ballroom in Chicago. In "Koi Pond", an episode of the sixth season of the American comedy television series The Office, Michael Scott (portrayed by Steve Carell) dresses in a suit similar to Samberg and Timberlake's characters, with a box wrapped as a present attached to his waist, while slipping a noose around his neck and faking a hanging to scare a group of young visitors. On an episode of The Ellen DeGeneres Show, aired in January 2007, Ellen DeGeneres performed a jingle for AQUA2GO water drink boxes to the tune of "Dick in a Box". The following month, Facebook created a virtual gift shop for Valentine's Day that included a box with a bow on top and a hole cut into one of its sides.

== Impact ==
Like "Lazy Sunday", "Dick in a Box" has found a wider audience during its online release than the initial television broadcast. The sketch, which has been rebroadcast over the years, has become one of the most popular SNL sketches and is widely recognized as one of the Lonely Island's signature songs. The viral video helped solidify the Lonely Island as a stand-alone comic act. In an interview with Esquire in 2013, Samberg said, "[Michaels] says the thing you're known for will be in quotes in the middle of your name. He's Lorne 'SNL' Michaels, and I'm Andy 'Dick in a Box' Samberg". Terri Schwartz of IFC opined that "'Lazy Sunday' might have been the first Lonely Island Digital Short to be featured on SNL, but it was 'Dick in a Box' that made the Digital Short one of the most anticipated skits on the improv series". Many people have since chosen costumes similar to those of Timberlake and Samberg for Halloween. Samberg was flattered by the costume trend, while Wiig was astonished by it, saying, "It was crazy. So I did expect it because I knew it was funny, but you never expect the level to which it goes." Samberg and Timberlake's costumes are also displayed at Saturday Night Live: The Exhibition, an exhibition about a week in the show's life on New York's Fifth Avenue.

Jorma recalled the working experience with Timberlake has become their standard, saying, "Getting to work with someone as wildly talented as Justin Timberlake, getting to spend maybe four days with him... That was amazing." "Dick in a Box" has inspired many subsequent sketches by the Lonely Island, including the similar-themed "Jizz in My Pants" and "I Just Had Sex" (2011), and has spawned two sequels, where Timberlake and Samberg reprised their roles. In "Motherlover" (2009), broadcast during the 34th season, the duo sings about their desire to have sex with each other's mothers (played by Patricia Clarkson and Susan Sarandon) as a tribute to Mother's Day. They find themselves invited to a threesome with a girl they met at the Payless ShoeSource (played by Lady Gaga) in season 36's "3-Way (The Golden Rule)" (2011). The duo also re-appeared on the special 100th Digital Short, which was broadcast in season 37 in May 2012.

== Credits and personnel ==
Credits are adapted from the liner notes of Incredibad.

=== Studio locations ===
- Mixed at Ansons Pocket Studio (Yorktown Heights, New York)
- Mastered at The Cutting Room (New York City)

=== Personnel ===
- Andy Samberg – lead vocals, songwriting
- Akiva Schaffer – songwriting
- Jorma Taccone – songwriting, producer
- Asa Taccone – songwriting, producer
- Justin Timberlake – lead vocals, songwriting
- Katreese Barnes – songwriting, producer
- Brian Sperber – mixing
- Tony Gillis – mastering

== Charts ==
Chart performance
Chart (2009–2011)	Peak position
Australia (ARIA)	61
Canada Hot 100 (Billboard)	82
Canadian Digital Song Sales (Billboard)	48
US Comedy Digital Track Sales (Billboard)	8

== Release history ==
Release dates and formats
Region	Date	Format	Distributor	Ref.
United States	December 16, 2006	TV premiere	NBC	
United States	December 17, 2006	Streaming	NBC	
United States	January 27, 2009	Digital single	Universal Republic	
