= Asa Taccone =

American musician (born 1981)

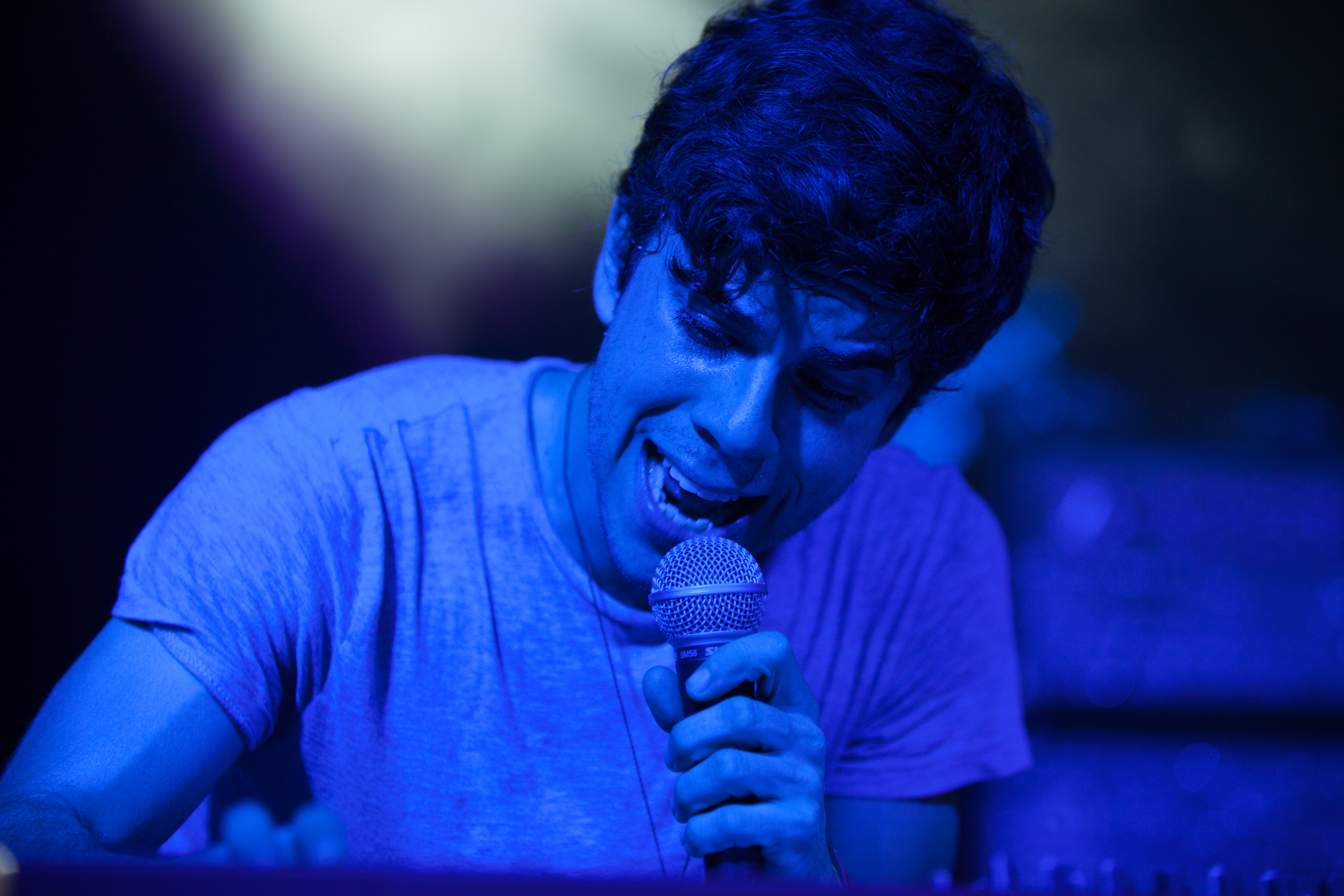
- Taccone performing at the Montreux Jazz Festival

Background information
- Born: September 21, 1981 (age 45); Berkeley, California, U.S.
- Occupations: Musician; songwriter; producer
- Years active: 2003–present
- Relatives: Jorma Taccone (brother); Tony Taccone (father)

Asa Taccone (born September 21, 1981) is an American musician, songwriter, producer, and frontman of the band Electric Guest with whom he has released four albums since 2012. He is noted as a close collaborator of The Lonely Island, and has contributed to their musical work on Saturday Night Live and a number of their films. He also has written music for other comedy film and television projects including American Dad! and Portlandia.

== Early life ==
Asa Taccone was born on September 21, 1981, the second son of Suellen Ehnebuske and Tony Taccone (a theater director) in Berkeley, California. His brother is Jorma Taccone, a former writer for Saturday Night Live and one third of the comedy music trio The Lonely Island. He is of mixed Italian and Puerto Rican ancestry on his father's side.

His interest in music began playing trumpet in his elementary school choir during religious holidays; the choir director included a bongo section where he and other children could sing and play the drums. During high school, he became interested in jazz, continuing to play trumpet in the band. Taccone was eventually kicked out of his high school, and sent to a boot camp that he could only leave on the weekends.

While there, he began to frequent a local Dunkin' Donuts. There, he met an elderly woman who remarked that he was "an electric guest of the universe."

== Career ==
Taccone had long been a fan of hip hop music, and was influenced by Bay Area rappers like Souls Of Mischief, E-40, and Mac Dre. He moved on to synths and started producing hip hop music, however, he eventually grew weary of the "bullshit" of the hip-hop world.

One day — while visiting an incarcerated friend — another inmate recognized Taccone, requesting that they work together after his release. The incident rattled Taccone, and he left the genre for good. His already budding interest in 1960s music increased, and he began making music that stemmed from that era.

Taccone's older brother, Jorma, joined the writing staff of Saturday Night Live in 2005, and enlisted Asa in composing music for the show's Digital Shorts performed by his comedy group The Lonely Island.

Jorma asked his friend Brian Burton (professionally known as Danger Mouse) to listen to some of Asa's music over the phone. Burton provided positive feedback, encouraging the younger Taccone to continue making music. At the age of 24, Asa made the move from his hometown to Los Angeles to pursue a music career. Burton recommended that Asa take his former room in a boarding house full of musicians.

Initially, Taccone found it difficult to collaborate with others creatively, after years of writing alone. He kept "grinding," producing and writing music for projects that included Digital Shorts on comedy show Saturday Night Live, as well as scores for his father's theatrical productions, making enough money to support himself and his own music. He wrote music for Lady Gaga’s episode on The Simpsons, Kanye West’s episode on The Cleveland Show, as well as Charles Bradley and The Weeknd's episodes on American Dad. Taccone was a co-writer and co-producer on the Portugal. The Man hit “Feel It Still.” The song became number one, and garnered the band a 2018 Grammy Award for Best Pop Duo/Group Performance.

In April 2018, Universal Music Publishing Group signed Taccone to a global administration deal.

Taccone is credited as a writer and the sole producer of the Portugal. The Man single, “Dummy.”

== Reception ==
"Even though I shed a couple of tears after I read that shit, I do kind of understand it, in a weird way, because of my involvement with Brian and then my brother's background. I think that that shit is just a deadly combination for people to just go: 'silver spoon!'"

— Asa Taccone to the newspaper The Age in response to a particularly negative review from Pitchfork

The Guardian calls Taccone "a strutting junior Jagger with an androgynous falsetto prepared to front EG's tunes with as much gall as it takes."

== Discography ==
=== With Electric Guest ===
- Mondo (2012)
- Plural (2017)
- Kin (2019)
- 10K (2025)

=== Production ===
| Title | Year | Artist | Album | Notes |
|---|---|---|---|---|
| "Just a Blessing" | 2003 | Dor 1, Sok The Virgo & Enzyme | The Network | Producer |
| "One Unit at a Time" | 2003 | Sok The Virgo & Theory | The Network | Producer |
| "No One Wants To See Me On Stage" | 2003 | Sokrates The Virgo | Elenchus: The Album | Producer |
| "1984" | 2003 | Sokrates The Virgo | Elenchus: The Album | Producer |
| "Benterlude" | 2003 | Sokrates The Virgo | Elenchus: The Album | Producer |
| "Sax Man" (feat. Jack Black) | 2009 | The Lonely Island | Incredibad | Producer |
| "Boombox" (feat. Julian Casablancas) | 2009 | The Lonely Island | Incredibad | Producer, writer |
| "Dick in a Box" (feat. Justin Timberlake) | 2009 | The Lonely Island | Incredibad | Producer, writer |
| "Natalie's Rap" (feat. Chris Parnell & Natalie Portman) | 2009 | The Lonely Island | Incredibad | Producer, writer |
| "Mama's Got A Brand New Swag (So Exquisite)" | 2010 | Joyo Velarde | Love & Understanding | Producer |
| "Take You Home" | 2010 | Joyo Velarde | Love & Understanding | Producer |
| "Motherlover" (feat. Justin Timberlake) | 2011 | The Lonely Island | Turtleneck & Chain | Producer, writer |
| "Ana" | 2011 | Charlotte Gainsbourg | Stage Whisper | Vocals |
| "Chariot" | 2016 | Luke Top | Suspect Highs | Vocals |
| "Real People" | 2016 | Ice Cube & Common | Barbershop: The Next Cut OST | Writer |
| "Tiger Smile" | 2017 | Nine Pound Shadow | Nine Pound Shadow EP | Album producer, writer, vocals |
| "Bridges" | 2017 | Nine Pound Shadow | Nine Pound Shadow EP | Album producer, writer, vocals |
| "Tell Me Why" | 2017 | Nine Pound Shadow | Nine Pound Shadow EP | Album producer, writer, vocals |
| "Melody" | 2017 | Nine Pound Shadow | Nine Pound Shadow EP | Album producer, writer, vocals |
| "Bright Like Gold" | 2017 | Nine Pound Shadow | Nine Pound Shadow EP | Album producer, writer, vocals |
| "Feel It Still" | 2017 | Portugal. The Man | Woodstock | Producer, writer |
| "Keep On" | 2017 | Portugal. The Man | Woodstock | Producer, writer |
| "Feels Right" | 2019 | Carly Rae Jepsen | Dedicated | Producer, featured artist |

=== Songwriting for media ===
| Title | Year | Artist | Production | Notes |
|---|---|---|---|---|
| "Lazy Sunday" | 2005 | The Lonely Island & Chris Parnell | Saturday Night Live | Writer |
| "Young Chuck Norris" | 2005 | The Lonely Island & Jason Sudeikis | Saturday Night Live | Writer |
| "Natalie's Rap" | 2006 | The Lonely Island, Chris Parnell & Natalie Portman | Saturday Night Live | Writer/producer |
| "Harpoon Man" | 2006 | The Lonely Island | Saturday Night Live | Writer |
| "Dick in a Box" | 2006 | The Lonely Island & Justin Timberlake | Saturday Night Live | Music/producer |
| "Andy Popping Into Frame" | 2007 | The Lonely Island | Saturday Night Live | Music |
| "Sloths" | 2007 | The Lonely Island | Saturday Night Live | Writer |
| "Roy Rules!" | 2007 | The Lonely Island | Saturday Night Live | Writer |
| "Iran So Far" | 2007 | The Lonely Island & Adam Levine | Saturday Night Live | Writer |
| "People Getting Punched Just Before Eating" | 2007 | The Lonely Island | Saturday Night Live | Writer |
| "Ace Rockwell: Thumper in Your Trumper" | 2007 | Himself | Hot Rod | Writer |
| "The Late, Late Show with Dr. Schadenfreude" | 2008 | Himself, Matthew Compton & Justin Bailey | Igor | Writer, performer |
| "Hero Song" | 2008 | The Lonely Island | Saturday Night Live | Writer |
| "Daiqurai Girl" | 2008 | The Lonely Island | Saturday Night Live | Writer |
| "GIRAFFES!" | 2008 | The Lonely Island | Saturday Night Live | Writer |
| "Motherlover" | 2009 | The Lonely Island & Justin Timberlake | Saturday Night Live | Producer |
| "Boombox" | 2010 | The Lonely Island & Julian Casablancas | Saturday Night Live | Writer |
| "What Was That?" | 2010 | The Lonely Island & Arcade Fire | Saturday Night Live | Writer |
| "We Happen to Be Clubbing" | 2010 | Himself & Drew Campbell | MacGruber | Writer, performer |
| "Dip a Toe" | 2011 | CeeLo Green | American Dad! | Writer |
| "Hot Tub Song" | 2011 | CeeLo Green | American Dad! | Writer |
| "Do Whatever You Like" | 2011 | CeeLo Green | American Dad! | Writer |
| "Daddy's Gone" | 2011 | Scott Grimes & Seth MacFarlane | American Dad! | Writer |
| "Hot Tub Research" | 2011 | CeeLo Green | American Dad! | Writer |
| "Psychotic Hot Tub" | 2011 | CeeLo Green | American Dad! | Writer |
| "End Credits Medley" | 2011 | CeeLo Green | American Dad! | Writer |
| "Girl You Need A Shot (Of B12 (Boyz 12))" | 2012 | Scott Grimes, et al. | American Dad! | Writer |
| "Dream of the '90s" | 2012 | Portlandia | Portlandia | Writer, performer |
| "Bad, Bad, Bad, Bad Boy" | 2013 | Scott Grimes | American Dad! | Writer |
| "The Perfect Gift" | 2013 | Rachel MacFarlane | American Dad! | Writer |
| "You Get the Rod" | 2013 | Charles Bradley | American Dad! | Writer |
| "We've Been Bad" | 2013 | Scott Grimes & Charles Bradley | American Dad! | Writer |
| "Family" | 2013 | Rachel MacFarlane & Daran Norris | American Dad! | Writer |
| "Rubbernecking" | 2014 | Chris Diamantopoulos, David Koechner, et al. | American Dad! | Writer |
| "Fraudulence" | 2014 | Terry Crews | American Dad! | Writer |
| "Is She Not Hot Enough?" | 2014 | Scott Grimes | American Dad! | Writer |
| "I Wanna Be Seen" | 2014 | Seth MacFarlane, Scott Grimes, et al. | American Dad! | Writer |
| "Old Springfield Anthem" | 2015 | Dan Castellaneta | The Simpsons | Writer |
| "New Springfield Anthem" | 2015 | Nancy Cartwright, et al. | The Simpsons | Writer |
| "Trapped in the Locker" | 2016 | Scott Grimes | American Dad! | Writer |
| "Real People" | 2016 | Ice Cube & Common | Barbershop: The Next Cut | Writer |
| "Owen’s Song" | 2019 | The Lonely Island | Popstar: Never Stop Never Stopping | Vocals |
| "The Snoopa Loompa Rap" | 2019 | Himself | American Dad! | Writer, performer |
| "The Weeknd's Dark Secret" | 2020 | The Weeknd | American Dad! | Writer |

=== Collaborations with the Lonely Island ===
- Saturday Night Live (2005–2008) – composer/additional music; 17 episodes
- Hot Rod (2007) – songwriter
- Incredibad (2009) – The Lonely Island
- MacGruber (2010) – additional instrumentations; film
- "Motherlover" (2011) – from The Lonely Island album Turtleneck & Chain
- The Wack Album (2013) – The Lonely Island
- 7 Days in Hell (2015) – music consultant; TV film
- Popstar: Never Stop Never Stopping (Original Soundtrack) (2016) — The Lonely Island

=== Composition for theater and film ===
- Bridge and Tunnel (2006) – music
- Taking Over (2009) – music
- Lemony Snicket’s The Composer Is Dead (2010) – film underscoring
- American Dad (2011–2020) – composer/voice actor; 7 episodes
- Neal Brennan: 3 Mics (2017) – composer

== Awards ==
- 2009 - Won a Primetime Emmy Award for Outstanding Original Music and Lyrics – "Dick in a Box"
