= We're Back! (disambiguation) =

"We're Back!" is a song by The Lonely Island.

We're Back! or We're Back may also refer to:

- We're Back! (album), by the Cal. State L.A. Jazz Ensemble
- We're Back! A Dinosaur's Story (book)
- We're Back! A Dinosaur's Story (film)
- "We're Back", a song by Eminem on the album Eminem Presents: The Re-Up
- "We Are Back", a 1991 single by LFO taken from the album Frequencies
