= I Just Had Sex =

2011 single by The Lonely Island

Single by The Lonely Island featuring Akon

from the album Turtleneck & Chain
- Released: December 19, 2010
- Genre: Comedy hip hop; dirty rap; electropop; R&B
- Length: 2:48
- Label: Universal Republic; Konvict
- Songwriters: Andy Samberg; Akiva Schaffer; Jorma Taccone; Justin Franks; Jerrod Bettis
- Producers: DJ Frank E; SKINS

The Lonely Island singles chronology
"I'm on a Boat" (2009)	"I Just Had Sex" (2010)	"The Creep" (2011)

Akon singles chronology
"Kush" (2010)	"I Just Had Sex" (2010)	"Who Dat Girl" (2011)

Music video
- I Just Had Sex on YouTube

"I Just Had Sex" is a song by American comedy hip hop group The Lonely Island featuring American singer Akon and producer DJ Frank E. It was released as the first single from The Lonely Island's second album, Turtleneck & Chain, released in May 2011. The video, featured as a Saturday Night Live digital short, stars Akon and The Lonely Island members Andy Samberg, Jorma Taccone and briefly, Akiva Schaffer, with guest appearances by Jessica Alba, Blake Lively and John McEnroe.

== Background ==
The Lonely Island, in the same fashion as the recording process for their debut, Incredibad, rented a house in Los Angeles and created a makeshift studio where they would record songs from that album.

Andy Samberg said that the song is "clearly from the perspective that the narrators are stunted". However, in countries such as Vietnam and Thailand, "I Just Had Sex" is played unironically in public. Akiva Schaffer remarked that "the nuance of the distinction would be lost if English wasn't your first language."

== Music video ==
The music video for "I Just Had Sex" features Akon, Andy Samberg, and Jorma Taccone singing about how they just had sex with their unsatisfied girlfriends played by Blake Lively and Jessica Alba. The music video takes place in New York City atop the MetLife Building with the backdrops of the Empire State Building, Chrysler Building and the cityscape. Various other locations such as Central Park, a household, a bakery, a bathroom, a museum, a pub, and a girls' changing room are shown. The song features John McEnroe, first appearing at the line "Having sex can make a nice man of the meanest." The Lonely Island member Akiva Schaffer, who directed the video, also makes several appearances. The album's title is referenced when Jorma sings "she let me wear my chain and turtleneck sweater" while showing him wearing the same outfit that appears on the album cover. The music video ends with the trio launching fireworks from their crotches, parodying Katy Perry's "Firework" music video.

== Charts ==
=== Weekly charts ===
Chart (2010–11)	Peak position
Australia (ARIA)	10
Austria (Ö3 Austria Top 40)	55
Belgium (Ultratop 50 Flanders)	26
Belgium (Ultratip Bubbling Under Wallonia)	2
Canada Hot 100 (Billboard)	13
Denmark (Tracklisten)	38
Ireland (IRMA)	44
New Zealand (Recorded Music NZ)	30
Norway (VG-lista)	8
South Korea (Gaon Digital Chart)	127
Sweden (Sverigetopplistan)	2
UK Singles (OCC)	68
US Billboard Hot 100	30

=== Year-end charts ===
Chart (2011)	Position
Australia (ARIA)	67
Sweden (Sverigetopplistan)	25

== Certifications ==
Region	Certification	Certified units/sales
Australia (ARIA)	Platinum	70,000^{^}
Denmark (IFPI Danmark)	Gold	900,000^{†}
New Zealand (RMNZ)	Gold	7,500^{*}
Sweden (GLF)	Platinum	40,000^{‡}
United Kingdom (BPI)	Silver	200,000^{‡}
United States (RIAA)	Platinum	1,300,000
^{*} Sales figures based on certification alone.^{^} Shipments figures based on certification alone.^{‡} Sales+streaming figures based on certification alone.^{†} Streaming-only figures based on certification alone.
