= Akiva Schaffer =

American filmmaker, comedian and musician (born 1977)

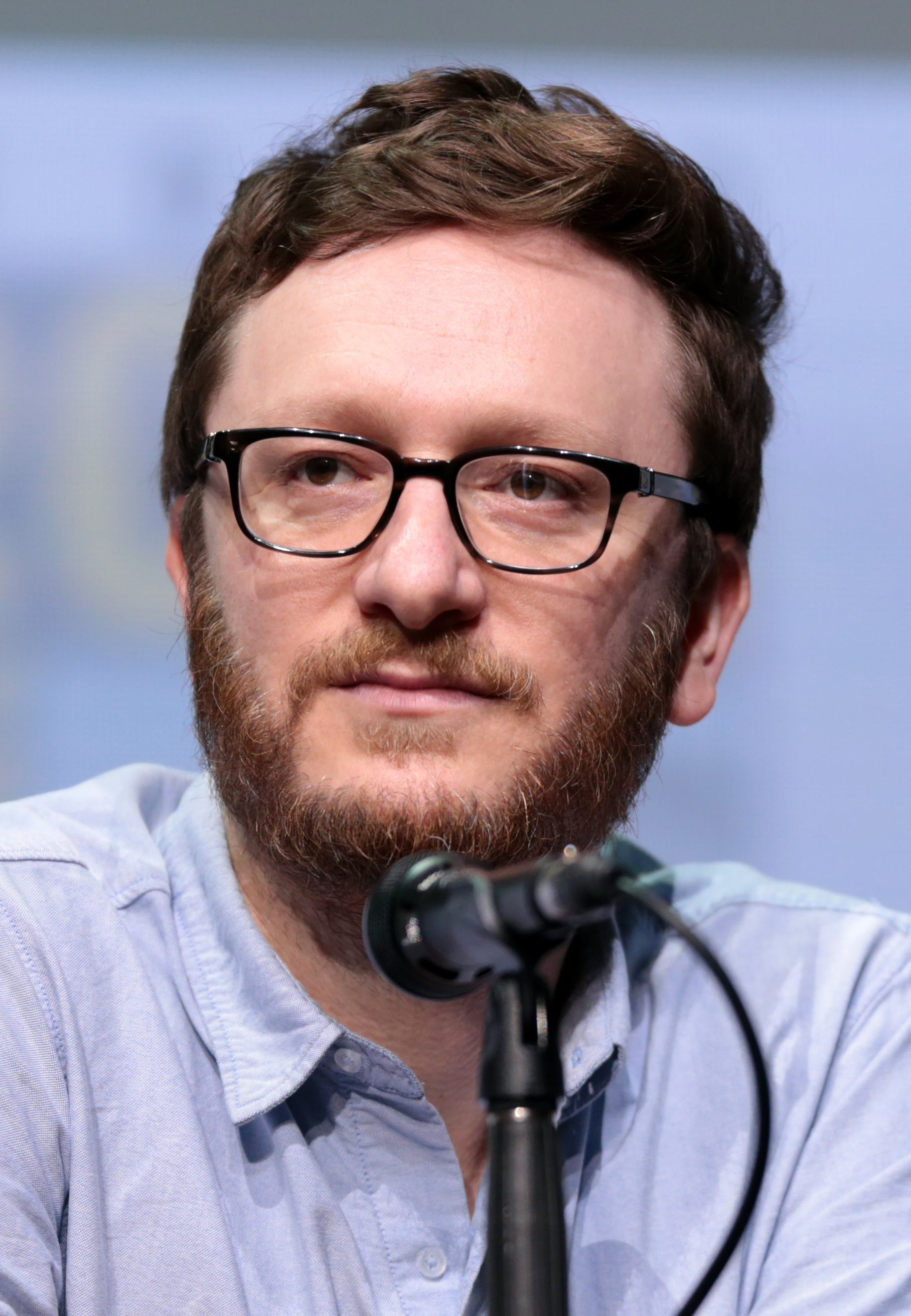
- Schaffer in 2017
- Born: Akiva Daniel Shebar Schaffer; December 1, 1977 (age 48); Berkeley, California, U.S.
- Education: University of California, Santa Cruz (BA)
- Occupations: Writer; producer; director; comedian; musician; actor
- Years active: 2001–present
- Spouse: Liz Cackowski (m. 2010)
- Children: 2

Comedy career
- Medium: Television; music; internet; film
- Genres: Sketch comedy; musical comedy; surreal humor; satire
- Musical career
- Genre: Comedy hip hop
- Works: The Lonely Island discography
- Member of: The Lonely Island
- Website: thelonelyisland.com

Signature
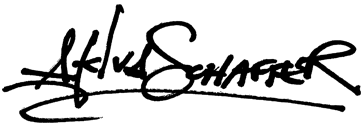

Akiva Daniel Shebar Schaffer (/əˈkiːvə ˈʃæfər/; born December 1, 1977) is an American writer, producer, director, comedian, actor, and rapper. He is a member of the comedy music group The Lonely Island, along with childhood friends Andy Samberg and Jorma Taccone. Schaffer began his career with The Lonely Island making videos for Channel 101. In 2005, Saturday Night Live hired the trio, with Schaffer joining as a writer. In their time at SNL, The Lonely Island pioneered the digital short format, creating popular sketches such as "Lazy Sunday", "I Just Had Sex", "I'm on a Boat", and "Dick in a Box". After SNL, Schaffer went on to direct movies including Hot Rod, The Watch, Popstar: Never Stop Never Stopping, Chip 'n Dale: Rescue Rangers, and The Naked Gun. The Lonely Island has made albums such as Incredibad, Turtleneck & Chain, and The Wack Album. Schaffer also produced a number of TV shows and movies, including MacGruber, Pen15, I Think You Should Leave with Tim Robinson, and Palm Springs.

== Early life ==
Schaffer was born in Berkeley, California to Jewish parents from New York.

In 2000, he graduated from the University of California, Santa Cruz with a degree in film.

== Career ==
We were putting ourselves through boot camp without any idea of what we were doing it for. We were training ourselves for the jobs we got.

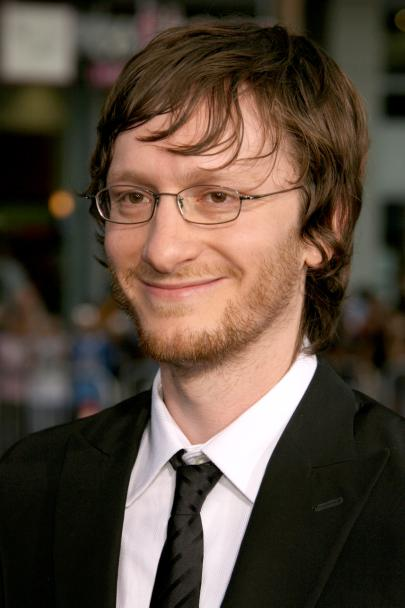
Schaffer at the premiere of Hot Rod in 2007

After college, he and his childhood friends, Andy Samberg and Jorma Taccone, moved to Los Angeles and began making comedy movies. Theater director Tony Taccone brought home the film Cat on a Hot Tin Roof, a choice the other men teased as being "too theatrical". The film, however, inspired Schaffer to write an overwrought play, in the style of Tennessee Williams, called The Lonely Island, in reference to their apartment. The name eventually extended to the comedy group itself. On the Internet, Schaffer got his start directing The Lonely Island's The 'Bu, the group's record-breaking contribution to Channel 101, which was a parody of The OC and starred Sarah Chalke as Melissa, as well as Samberg and Taccone. Schaffer has contributed to several other Channel 101 productions as part of the Lonely Island.

In the fall of 2005, Schaffer was hired for Saturday Night Live where he directed, co-wrote, and edited the majority of the SNL Digital Shorts. Some notable shorts/songs include "Lazy Sunday", "I Just Had Sex", "Natalie's Rap", "Dick in a Box", "Peyton Manning for the United Way", "Iran So Far", "Jizz in My Pants", "Boombox", "I'm on a Boat", "Great Day", "Threw It on the Ground", "Jack Sparrow", "Like A Boss", "YOLO", "Semicolon", "Dear Sister", "Spring Break Anthem", "Shy Ronnie", "Ras Trent" and "Motherlover", the sequel to "Dick in a Box".

In 2007, Schaffer directed and acted in the film Hot Rod, which starred Samberg, Taccone, Bill Hader, Danny McBride, Isla Fisher, Ian McShane, and Sissy Spacek, which was produced by SNL's Lorne Michaels.

Schaffer directed the film The Watch starring Ben Stiller, Vince Vaughn, Jonah Hill and Richard Ayoade, and written by Seth Rogen and Evan Goldberg.

The Lonely Island has released three albums (Incredibad, Turtleneck & Chain, The Wack Album) along with two full soundtracks (Popstar: Never Stop Never Stopping and The Unauthorized Bash Brothers Experience). In 2014, the group co-wrote "Everything is Awesome", the theme song to the film, The Lego Movie. It was nominated for Best Original Song which they performed at the 2015 Oscars. That same year, Everything Is Awesome was certified platinum by the RIAA, joining their previous platinum singles, "I'm on a Boat" (2×), "I Just Had Sex", "Jizz in My Pants", and the gold-certified single "Like a Boss".

Schaffer was credited as an executive producer on the film MacGruber. The film was co-written and directed by Jorma Taccone.

In 2016 Schaffer co-wrote, co-directed, and co-starred in the Judd Apatow produced feature film, Popstar: Never Stop Never Stopping. The film focuses on pop/rap superstar Conner4Real (Samberg), who goes into a major tailspin and watches his celebrity high life collapse after his new album fails to sell records.

He also co-directed/created Michael Bolton's Big, Sexy Valentine's Day Special for Netflix with Scott Aukerman.

Schaffer directed four music videos for the band We Are Scientists and one for the Eagles of Death Metal.

In 2018, Schaffer guest-starred on NBC sitcom Brooklyn Nine-Nine, portraying Brett Booth in the episode Show me Going.

The Lonely Island co-produced both seasons of I Think You Should Leave with Tim Robinson, most episodes of which Schaffer has co-directed with Alice Mathias. Also in 2019, they released Netflix's The Unauthorized Bash Brothers Experience, a visual poem about former Oakland A's legends Jose Canseco and Mark McGwire. That summer, The Lonely Island embarked on their first ever live tour, instantly selling out venues across the United States and drawing some of the biggest crowds of the weekend at the Bonnaroo Festival and Milwaukee's Summerfest.

Schaffer produced the film Palm Springs, which debuted on Hulu in July 2020 and delivered the largest opening weekend viewership ever for a film on the platform. Prior to launching on Hulu, NEON/Hulu acquired the film for a record-setting $17,500,000.69 at the 2020 Sundance Film Festival, making it the biggest deal in the festival's history. Most recently, the film and cast were nominated for five Super Critics Choice Awards, a Golden Globe Award nomination for Best Picture, Musical or Comedy, as well as a Best Performance by an Actor in a Motion Picture, Musical or Comedy nomination for Samberg. The film also won a Critics' Choice Movie Awards in the category of Best Comedy and garnered a Writers Guild of America Award nomination for Best Original Screenplay.

Schaffer also executive produces Hulu's Emmy nominated show, PEN15, starring Maya Erskine and Anna Konkle.

Schaffer directed the Disney film Chip 'n Dale: Rescue Rangers. The film stars Andy Samberg and John Mulaney and is a combination of live action and computer animation. It was released in Spring 2022.

Schaffer hosts The Lonely Island and Seth Meyers Podcast with Samberg, Taccone and Seth Meyers, which discusses The Lonely Island's SNL Digital Shorts.

== Personal life ==
Schaffer is married to comedy writer and actress Liz Cackowski; they have two children.

== Filmography ==
=== Film ===
Year	Title	Director	Writer	Producer	Notes
2007	Hot Rod	Yes	Uncredited	No	
2008	Extreme Movie	No	Yes	No	
2012	The Watch	Yes	No	No	
2016	Popstar: Never Stop Never Stopping	Yes	Yes	Yes	Co-directed with Jorma Taccone
2022	Chip 'n Dale: Rescue Rangers	Yes	No	No	
2025	The Naked Gun	Yes	Yes	Executive	

Producer only

- MacGruber (2010) (Executive producer)
- Brigsby Bear (2017)
- I Used to Go Here (2020)
- Palm Springs (2020)

Acting credits

Year	Title	Role
2007	Hot Rod	Derek
2012	The Watch	Casual Wanker #3
2013	Grown Ups 2	Male Cheerleader
2014	Neighbors	Toga #2
2016	Popstar: Never Stop Never Stopping	Lawrence
2018	7 Splinters in Time	McFly
2022	Chip 'n Dale: Rescue Rangers	Rescue Rangers director, Voices of E.T, Colonel, Harold, Mr. Natural, Officer Chameleon, Officer Puppet Sock, Black and White Cartoon Shoeshiner, Hungry Mouse, Pig in a Sauna
2022	Weird: The Al Yankovic Story	Alice Cooper

=== Television ===
Year	Title	Director	Executive producer	Writer	Notes
2003–2005	The 'Bu	No	Yes	Yes	Also creator
2005–2011	Saturday Night Live	Yes	No	Yes	68 episodes (director); 116 episodes (writer)
2014–2018	Brooklyn Nine-Nine	Yes	No	No	Episodes "Charges and Specs" and "The Puzzle Master"
2016	Party Over Here	No	Yes	No	
2017	The Gorburger Show	No	Yes	No	
2017–2019	I'm Sorry	No	Yes	No	
2018	Alone Together	No	Yes	No	Also creator
2019–2023	I Think You Should Leave with Tim Robinson	Yes	Yes	No	9 episodes
2019–2021	Pen15	No	Yes	No	

TV specials

Year	Title	Director	Producer	Writer	Notes
2004	2004 MTV Movie Awards	No	No	Yes	
2004	Channel 101	Yes	Yes	Yes	Segment "Football Town"; Also editor
2005	2005 MTV Movie Awards	No	No	Yes	
2009	2009 MTV Movie Awards	No	Co-producer	Yes	
2015	Saturday Night Live 40th Anniversary Special	No	No	Yes	
2017	Michael Bolton's Big, Sexy Valentine's Day Special	Yes	Executive	No	Co-directed with Scott Aukerman
2019	76th Golden Globe Awards	No	No	Yes	Special material
2019	The Unauthorized Bash Brothers Experience	Yes	Yes	Yes	Also editor

TV movies

Year	Title	Director	Producer	Writer	Notes
2003	Regarding Ardy	Yes	Yes	Yes	Also editor
2004	G-Phoria 2004	No	No	Yes	Documentary
2017	Home for the Weekend	No	Executive	No	

Acting credits

Year	Title	Role	Notes
2008–2024	Saturday Night Live	Various characters	9 episodes
2016	Party Over Here	The Lonely Island (Uncredited)	Episode "Suffragettes"
2017	Michael Bolton's Big, Sexy Valentine's Day Special	Alan	TV special
2018	Brooklyn Nine-Nine	Brett Booth	Episode "Show Me Going"
2019	The Unauthorized Bash Brothers Experience	Mark McGwire	

== Awards ==
In 2007, Schaffer won an Emmy for his participation in the production of "Dick in a Box". He was nominated for an Emmy for the song "Motherlover." He was featured in People's Sexiest Bachelor with Andy Samberg, as Sexiest Best Friends. He has also won two Writers Guild of America Awards and a Peabody Award for his work on Saturday Night Live. The Lonely Island was nominated in 2009 for a People's Choice Award and a Grammy Award.

Year	Award	Category	Work	Result
2007	Primetime Emmy Award	Outstanding Original Music and Lyrics for the song "Dick In A Box"	Saturday Night Live	Won
2007	Writers Guild of America Award	Comedy/Variety (Including Talk) - Series	Saturday Night Live	Won
2008	Primetime Emmy Award	Outstanding Writing for a Variety, Music or Comedy Program	Saturday Night Live	Nominated
2009	Primetime Emmy Award	Outstanding Writing for a Variety, Music or Comedy Series	Saturday Night Live	Nominated
2009	Primetime Emmy Award	Outstanding Original Music and Lyrics for the song "Motherlover"	Saturday Night Live	Nominated
2009	Writers Guild of America Award	Comedy/Variety (Including Talk) - Series	Saturday Night Live	Won
2010	Primetime Emmy Award	Outstanding Original Music and Lyrics for the song "Shy Ronnie"	Saturday Night Live	Nominated
2010	Primetime Emmy Award	Outstanding Writing for a Variety, Music or Comedy Series	Saturday Night Live	Nominated
2010	Grammy Award	Best Rap/Sung Collaboration	"I'm on a Boat"	Nominated
2010	Writers Guild of America Award	Comedy/Variety (Including Talk) - Series	Saturday Night Live	Won
2011	Primetime Emmy Award	Outstanding Original Music and Lyrics for the song "Jack Sparrow"	Saturday Night Live	Nominated
2011	Primetime Emmy Award	Outstanding Original Music and Lyrics for the song "3-Way (The Golden Rule)"	Saturday Night Live	Nominated
2011	Primetime Emmy Award	Outstanding Original Music and Lyrics for the song "I Just Had Sex"	Saturday Night Live	Nominated
2011	Primetime Emmy Award	Outstanding Writing for a Variety, Music or Comedy Series	Saturday Night Live	Nominated
2012	Grammy Award	Best Comedy Album	Turtleneck & Chain	Nominated
2012	Improvisation News New York Awards (INNY Award)	Best Comedy Video	Saturday Night Live	Won
2012	Writers Guild of America Award	Comedy/Variety (Including Talk) - Series	Saturday Night Live	Nominated
2014	Hollywood Music In Media Awards (HMMA)	Best Song - Animated Film for the song "Everything Is Awesome"	The Lego Movie	Won
2014	Online Film & Television Association (OFTA Television Award)	Best Direction in a Comedy Series	Brooklyn Nine-Nine	Nominated
2014	Phoenix Film Critics Society Awards (PFCS Award)	Best Original Song for the song "Everything Is Awesome"	The Lego Movie	Won
2015	Primetime Emmy Award	Outstanding Writing for a Variety Special	Saturday Night Live 40th Anniversary Special	Nominated
2015	Grammy Award	Best Song Written for Visual Media for the song "Everything Is Awesome"	The Lego Movie	Nominated
2015	International Online Cinema Awards (INOCA)	Best Original Song for the song "Everything Is Awesome"	The Lego Movie	Nominated
2015	Iowa Film Critics Awards	Best Song for the song "Everything Is Awesome"	The Lego Movie	Nominated
2015	Satellite Awards	Best Original Song for the song "Everything Is Awesome"	The Lego Movie	Nominated
2016	Las Vegas Film Critics Society Awards (Sierra Award)	Best Song for the song "Finest Girl (Bin Laden Song)"	Popstar: Never Stop Never Stopping	Nominated
2018	Writers Guild of America Award	Comedy/Variety (Music, Awards, Tributes) - Specials	Michael Bolton's Big, Sexy Valentine's Day Special	Nominated
2019	Gotham Independent Film Award	Breakthrough Series - Shortform	PEN15	Won
2021	Primetime Emmy Award	Outstanding Comedy Series	PEN15	Nominated
