= Jorma Taccone =

American filmmaker, comedian and musician (born 1977)

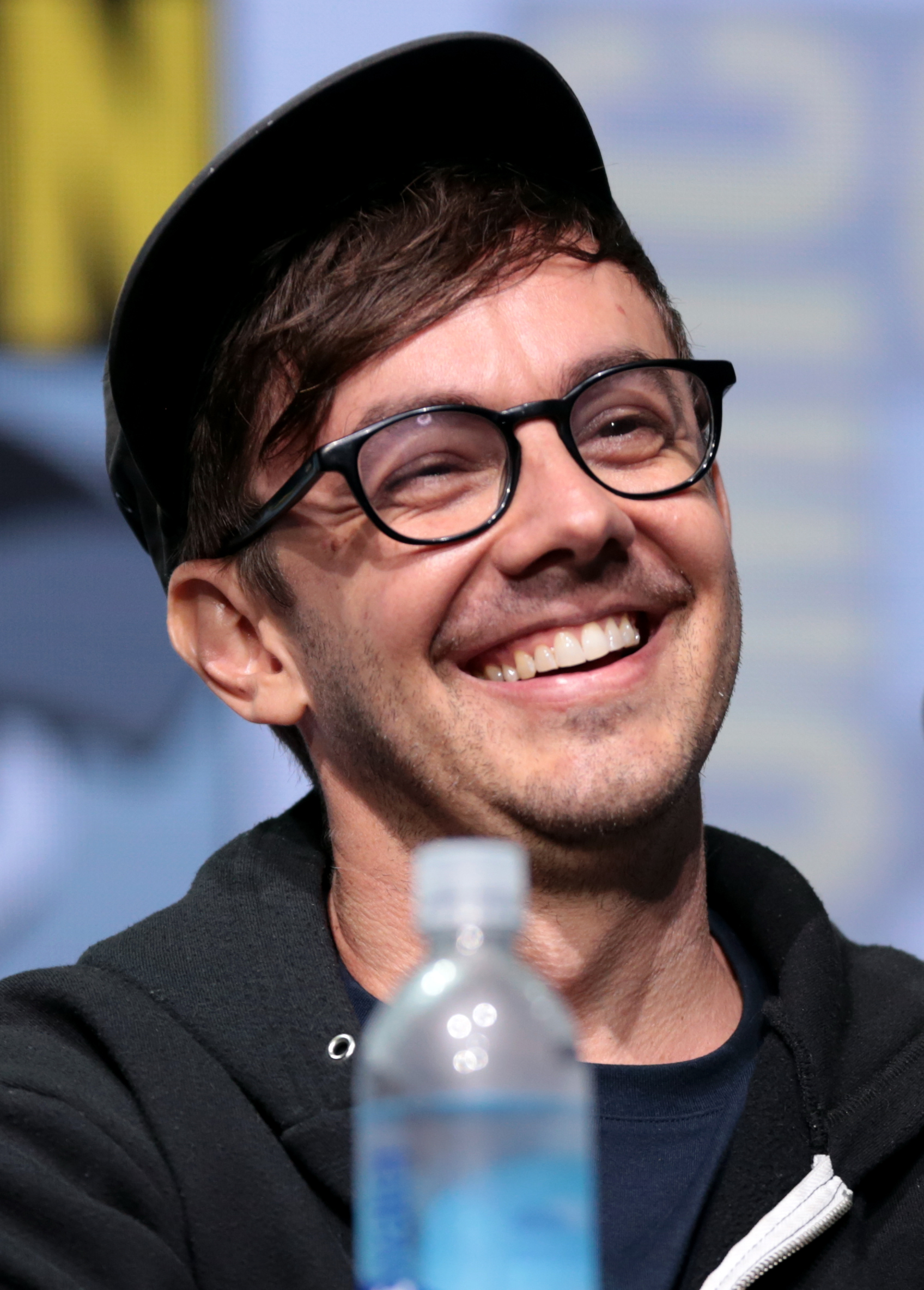
- Taccone in 2017
- Born: Jorma Christopher Taccone; March 19, 1977 (age 49); Berkeley, California, U.S.
- Education: University of California, Los Angeles (BA)
- Occupations: Writer; producer; director; comedian; musician; actor
- Years active: 2001–present
- Spouse: Marielle Heller (m. 2007)
- Children: 2
- Father: Tony Taccone
- Relatives: Asa Taccone (brother); Emily Heller (sister-in-law)

Comedy career
- Medium: Television; music; internet; film
- Genres: Sketch comedy; musical comedy; surreal humor; satire
- Musical career
- Genre: Comedy hip hop
- Works: The Lonely Island discography
- Member of: The Lonely Island
- Website: thelonelyisland.com

Jorma Christopher Taccone (/ˈjɔːrmə təˈkoʊni/ YOR-mə tə-KOH-nee; born March 19, 1977) is an American writer, producer, director, comedian, actor, and musician. He is a member of the comedy music group The Lonely Island with his childhood friends Andy Samberg and Akiva Schaffer. In 2010, Taccone co-wrote and directed the SNL spinoff film MacGruber, which was his directorial debut. He directed his second feature alongside Schaffer, the musical comedy Popstar: Never Stop Never Stopping, which he also co-wrote and co-starred in with Schaffer and Samberg.

== Early life and education ==
Taccone was born in Berkeley, California, to Suellen Ehnebuske and Tony Taccone, the artistic director of the Berkeley Repertory Theatre. His father is of half Italian and half Puerto Rican descent. Taccone attended the University of California, Los Angeles, and graduated with a BA in Theater in 2000. He spent one semester at the University of Lancaster in United Kingdom as part of his degree study. His brother, Asa, is a member of the band Electric Guest. He is named after Jorma Kaukonen, Jefferson Airplane's famed guitarist.

== Career ==
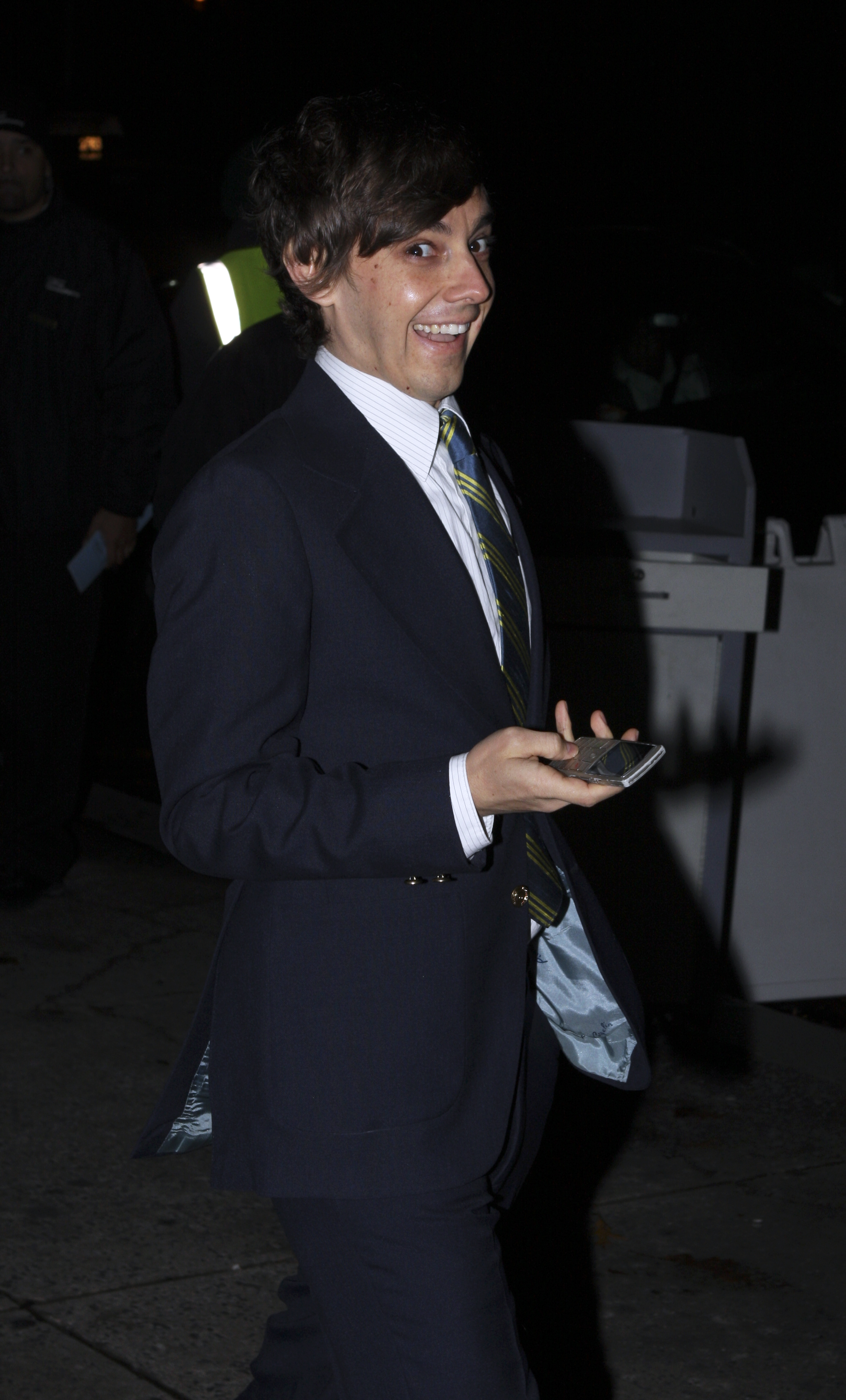
Taccone in 2007

In the fall of 2005, Samberg, Taccone, and Schaffer joined the staff of NBC's late-night variety show Saturday Night Live. Since then, as The Lonely Island, they have created more than 100 SNL Digital Shorts including the YouTube favorites "Lazy Sunday" (featuring Chris Parnell), "Jizz in My Pants", "I'm on a Boat" (featuring T-Pain) and the Emmy-winning "Dick in a Box" (featuring Justin Timberlake). Taccone produces much of the music for The Lonely Island, including "Lazy Sunday", "Dick in a Box", and many other tracks that appear on The Lonely Island first album, Incredibad, released in February 2009. As a director, he is responsible for the SNL shorts "MacGruber", "Business Meeting", "Sloths", "Giraffes", and others. He also directed a "MacGruber" Pepsi commercial spot for the 43rd Super Bowl, which aired February 1, 2009.

In 2007, Taccone co-starred in Paramount's Hot Rod (starring Andy Samberg, directed by Akiva Schaffer). He is one of the principal actors in the music video "Jizz in My Pants" too. He played Guy #2 in "We Like Sportz", reprising the role from "Just 2 Guyz", and the lead role of Brett in The Lonely Island's The 'Bu, the group's record-breaking contribution to Channel 101, where he played a ninja who did not belong. The 'Bu, a parody of The OC, also starred Sarah Chalke as Melissa and Andy Samberg as Aaron. In the group's first Channel 101 show, "ITV Buzz Countdown", he played Chris Hoffman, a fictional VJ in a parody of MTV's Total Request Live.

Taccone made a cameo appearance in Role Models as Mitch from Graphics, where he sang a karaoke version of the Scorpions' "Rock You Like a Hurricane"; and co-starred in the Gnarls Barkley music video for the song "Who's Gonna Save My Soul".

Taccone appeared as Chaka in Universal's 2009 film Land of the Lost (starring Will Ferrell), for which he was nominated for the Razzie Award for Worst Supporting Actor. In August 2009, he directed his first film, an adaptation of the Saturday Night Live sketch MacGruber that was featured as part of the group male vocals on Lightspeed Champion's album Life Is Sweet! Nice to Meet You. As of SNL's 36th season, he was no longer cited in the end credits, though he was still listed on the NBC website as a writer and holds the unofficial title of "Sexiest Member of Lonely Island". However, according to the band's website, thelonelyisland.com, "the Dudes" were still responsible for the SNL Digital Shorts. It was later confirmed Taccone had left Saturday Night Live, though he worked on some shorts in the 36th season.

Taccone acted in season 5 of MyDamnChannel's Wainy Days and is the director of the AT&T Wireless television ad campaign It's Not Complicated. He also had a recurring role on the HBO show Girls as the character Booth Jonathan.

In 2015, Taccone appeared in the Kickstarter short movie Kung Fury as Adolf Hitler (A.K.A. Kung-Führer). He will play this role again in the sequel Kung Fury 2.

In 2020, Taccone authored a children's book, illustrated by Dan Santat, titled Little Fox and the Wild Imagination.

Taccone hosts The Lonely Island and Seth Meyers Podcast with Samberg, Schaffer and Seth Meyers, which discusses The Lonely Island's SNL Digital Shorts.

== Personal life ==
Taccone lives in New York City. He is married to film director Marielle Heller, with whom he has a son (born December 2014) and a daughter (born August 2020). His brother-in-law, Nate, a musician, composed the scores for The Diary of a Teenage Girl and Can You Ever Forgive Me?. His sister-in-law, Emily Heller, is a stand-up comic and a writer for the HBO comedy Barry.

On August 31, 2025, Taccone was hospitalized after he fell 20 feet (6m) and shattered his pelvis. By November, he was recovered enough to dance on stage at a Portugal. The Man concert in Brooklyn.

== Filmography ==
=== Film ===
Year	Title	Director	Writer	Producer	Notes
2007	Hot Rod	No	Uncredited	No	
2008	Extreme Movie	No	Yes	No	
2010	MacGruber	Yes	Yes	No	
2016	Popstar: Never Stop Never Stopping	Yes	Yes	Yes	Co-directed with Akiva Schaffer
2017	Brigsby Bear	No	No	Yes	
2020	Palm Springs	No	No	Yes	
2026	Over Your Dead Body	Yes	No	No	

Executive producer

- The Diary of a Teenage Girl (2015)
- It Happened in L.A. (2017)
- The Unauthorized Bash Brothers Experience (2019)
- Over Your Dead Body (2026)

==== Acting roles ====
Year	Title	Role	Notes
2007	Hot Rod	Kevin Powell	
2008	Role Models	Mitch from Graphics	Cameo
2009	Land of the Lost	Cha-Ka	Nominated—Razzie Award for Worst Supporting Actor
2012	The Watch	Guy	Cameo (with The Lonely Island)
2013	Grown Ups 2	Male Cheerleader	Cameo (with The Lonely Island)
2014	The Lego Movie	William Shakespeare	Voice
2014	Neighbors	Toga #3	Cameo (with The Lonely Island)
2015	Kung Fury	Adolf Hitler	
2016	Popstar: Never Stop Never Stopping	Owen "Kid Contact" Bouchard	
2016	Storks	Miscellaneous Storks	Voice
2017	It Happened in L.A.	Elliot	
2018	Rampage	Scuba Diver	Deleted scene
2018	Spider-Man: Into the Spider-Verse	Norman Osborn / Green Goblin, Peter Parker / Spider-Man (Earth-67)	Voice
2019	The Lego Movie 2: The Second Part	Larry Poppins	Voice
2020	An American Pickle	Liam	
2020	I Used to Go Here	Bradley Cooper	
2022	Chip 'n Dale: Rescue Rangers	Batman, Fan Con Announcer, Toon Car	Voice
2022	Weird: The Al Yankovic Story	Pee-wee Herman	
2022	The People We Hate at the Wedding	Jonathan	
2023	Spider-Man: Across the Spider-Verse	Adriano Tumino / Vulture, Peter Parker / Spider-Man (Earth-67)	Voice
2024	Sonic the Hedgehog 3	Kyle Lancebottom	
TBA	Kung Fury 2	Adolf Hitler	Post-production

=== Television ===
Year	Title	Director	Writer	Producer	Notes
2003–2005	The 'Bu	No	Yes	Yes	Web series
2004	2004 MTV Movie Awards	No	Yes	No	TV special
2005	Awesometown	Yes	Yes	Yes	TV special
2005	2005 MTV Movie Awards	No	Yes	No	
2005–2014	Saturday Night Live	Yes	Yes	No	Segment director: 26 episodes; writer: 101 episodes
2011–2013	Parks and Recreation	Yes	No	No	
2012	Up All Night	Yes	No	No	Episode "First Birthday"
2013	Brooklyn Nine-Nine	Yes	No	No	Episode "Thanksgiving"
2016	Party Over Here	No	No	Yes	
2017	The Gorburger Show	No	No	Yes	
2017–2019	I'm Sorry	No	No	Yes	
2018	Alone Together	No	No	Yes	
2018–2019	The Last O.G.	Yes	No	Yes	Director: 5 episodes
2019	Miracle Workers	Yes	No	Yes	Director: 2 episodes
2019–2021	PEN15	No	No	Yes	
2019–2023	I Think You Should Leave with Tim Robinson	No	No	Yes	
2021	MacGruber	Yes	Yes	Yes	
2024	Knuckles	Yes	No	No	Episode "The Flames of Disaster"

Production staff

- Spin City (2001–2002) (7 episodes)

==== Acting roles ====
Year	Title	Role	Notes
2005–2014	Saturday Night Live	Various	22 episodes
2009	Tim and Eric Awesome Show, Great Job!	Himself	Episode: "Tennis"
2011	Up All Night	Benjamin "B-Ro" Roth	Episode: "Working Late and Working It"
2012–2013	Girls	Booth Jonathan	3 episodes
2013–2014	The League	Spazz	3 episodes
2014	Gravity Falls	Gabe Bensen (voice)	2 episodes
2014–2016	Comedy Bang! Bang!	Himself	3 episodes
2015	Parks and Recreation	Roscoe Santangelo	3 episodes
2015	Man Seeking Woman	Cupid	Episode: "Sizzurp"
2015	Major Lazer	Various voices	3 episodes
2016	Brooklyn Nine-Nine	Taylor	Episode: "Coral Palms Pt. 1"
2017	Michael Bolton's Big, Sexy Valentine's Day Special	Punk Rocker	Variety special
2018	Drunk History	Mehmed the Conqueror	Episode: "Halloween"
2019	Miracle Workers	Kiss Cam Voiceover Guy (voice)	Episode: "1 Day"
2019	The Unauthorized Bash Brothers Experience	Reporter / Walt Weiss / Joe Montana	Variety special
2019	Bless the Harts	Craig (voice)	Episode: "Myrtle Beach Memoirs"
2020	Helpsters	Painter Pat	Episode: "Firefighter Fran & Painter Pat"
2024	Knuckles	Radio Host Announcer (voice)	Episode: "Don't Ever Say I Wasn't There For You"

=== Songwriting for media ===
Year	Title	Artist	Production	Notes
2005–2016	Various	The Lonely Island	Saturday Night Live	
2010	"MacGruber's Theme"	Cornbread Compton & The Silver Lake Chorus	MacGruber	
2010	"The Perfect Number"	Kristen Wiig	MacGruber	
2014	"Everything is Awesome!"	Jo-Li feat. The Lonely Island	The Lego Movie	
2014	"Everything Is Awesome!" (Remix)	Tegan and Sara feat. The Lonely Island	The Lego Movie	
2016	Various	Various	Popstar: Never Stop Never Stopping	
2019	"Super Cool"	Beck feat. Robyn & The Lonely Island	The Lego Movie 2: The Second Part	Additional lyrics

== Videography ==
- "Just 2 Guyz" (2005)
- "Jizz in My Pants" (2008)
- "Who's Gonna Save My Soul" (2008)
- "We Like Sportz" (2008)
- "I'm on a Boat" (2009)
- "Like a Boss" (2009)
- "I Just Had Sex" (2010)
- "The Creep" (2011)
- "House of Cosbys" (2011)
- "We're Back!" (2011)
- "We'll Kill U" (2011)
- "Jack Sparrow" (2011)
- "American Daydream" (2012)
- "YOLO" (2013)
- "Between Two Ferns/Spring Break Anthem" (2013)
- "Diaper Money" (2013)
- "We Need Love" (2013)
- "The Wire" (2013)
- "Hugs" (2013)
- "Go Kindergarten" (2013)
