= Andy Samberg =

American actor, comedian, and musician (born 1978)

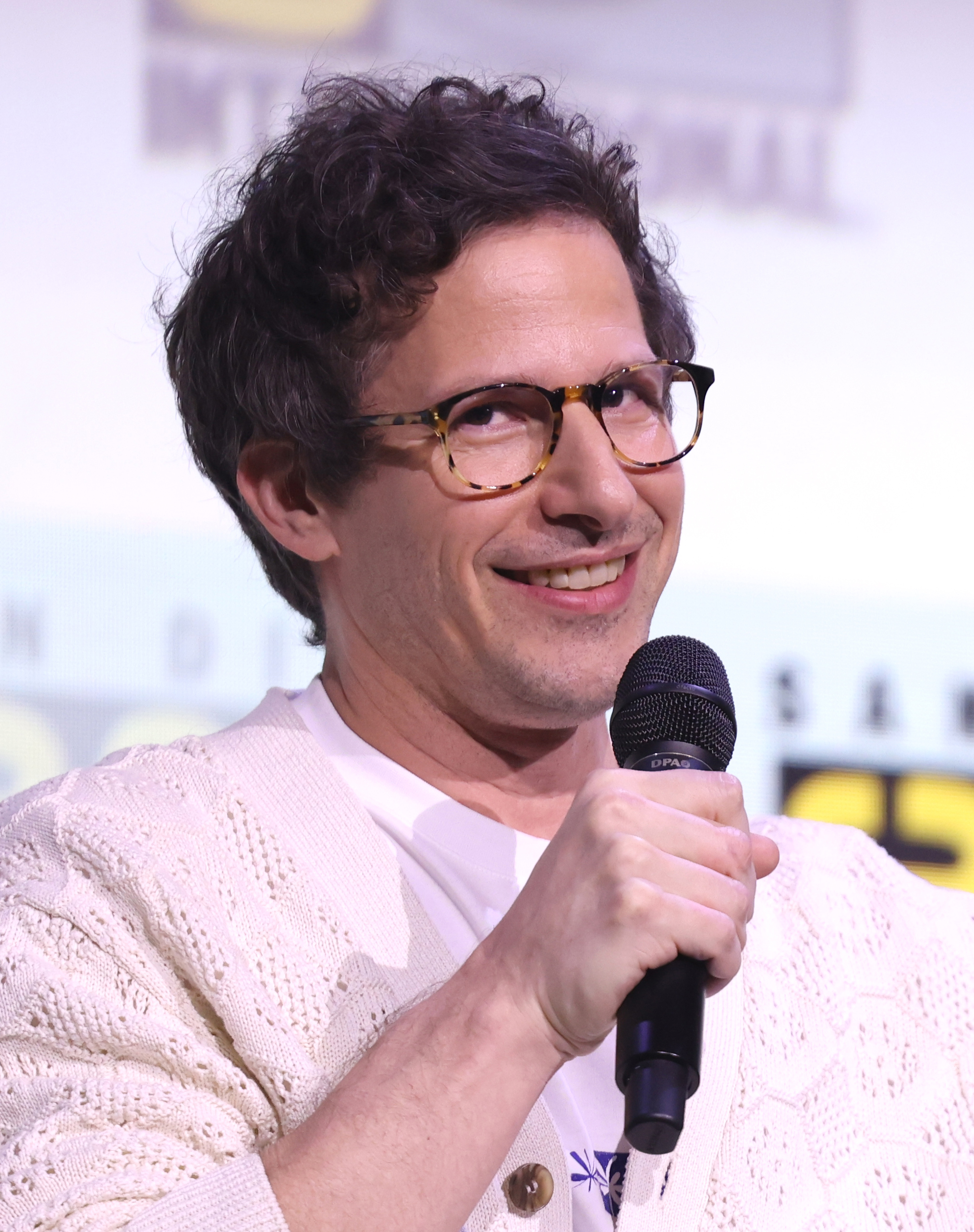
- Samberg at the 2025 San Diego Comic-Con
- Born: David Andrew Jerome Samberg; August 18, 1978 (age 48); Berkeley, California, U.S.
- Education: New York University (BFA)
- Occupations: Actor; comedian; musician; writer; producer
- Years active: 1999–present
- Spouse: Joanna Newsom (m. 2013)
- Children: 2
- Relatives: Alfred J. Marrow (adoptive grandfather); Tammy Baldwin (third cousin)

Comedy career
- Medium: Television; film; music; internet
- Genres: Improvisational comedy; anti-humor; musical comedy; physical comedy; sketch comedy
- Musical career
- Genre: Comedy hip hop
- Works: The Lonely Island discography
- Member of: The Lonely Island
- Website: thelonelyisland.com

Signature
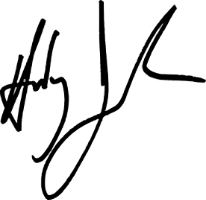

David Andrew Jerome Samberg (born August 18, 1978) is an American actor, comedian, rapper, writer and producer. He is a member of the comedy music group the Lonely Island, along with childhood friends Akiva Schaffer and Jorma Taccone. Samberg was also a cast member and writer for the NBC sketch comedy series Saturday Night Live from 2005 to 2012, where he and his fellow group members are credited with popularizing the SNL Digital Shorts.

Samberg's starring film roles include Hot Rod (2007), That's My Boy (2012), Celeste and Jesse Forever (2012), Popstar: Never Stop Never Stopping (2016), and Palm Springs (2020). He has voiced roles in Space Chimps (2008), the Cloudy with a Chance of Meatballs film series (2009–present), the Hotel Transylvania film series (2012–present), Storks (2016), Chip 'n Dale: Rescue Rangers (2022), Spider-Man: Across the Spider-Verse (2023), and Zootopia 2 (2025). From 2013 to 2021, he portrayed Jake Peralta in the Fox/NBC police procedural sitcom series Brooklyn Nine-Nine, which he also produced. For his work on the show, he was awarded a Golden Globe Award for Best Actor – Television Series Musical or Comedy in 2013.

== Early life and education ==
David Andrew Jerome Samberg was born in Berkeley, California, on August 18, 1978. His mother, Marjorie "Margi" (née Marrow), is a retired teacher, who taught at John Muir Elementary School, and his father, Joe Samberg, is a photographer. He has two older sisters, Johanna and Darrow. His family is Jewish, and Samberg described his upbringing as "I wouldn't say we're super-religious, but we're very much in touch with the cultural aspect of it." Samberg never had a bar mitzvah. He attended Chabot Elementary School with his future Brooklyn Nine-Nine co-star Chelsea Peretti. At age 5, he told his parents that he wanted to change his name to Andy.

In a 2019 episode of Finding Your Roots, hosted by Henry Louis Gates Jr., Samberg discovered that his mother Marjorie, who was adopted by Jewish parents, is the biological daughter of a Sicilian Catholic father named Salvatore Maida, who immigrated in 1925, and a German Jewish refugee mother named Ellen Philipsborn, who had come to the U.S. in 1938; they met in San Francisco. Samberg's adoptive maternal grandfather was industrial psychologist and philanthropist Alfred J. Marrow; through him, he is a third cousin of U.S. senator Tammy Baldwin (D-WI).

Samberg graduated from Berkeley High School in 1996, where he became interested in creative writing and has stated that writing classes "were the ones that I put all my effort into... that's what I cared about and that's what I ended up doing". He attended college at University of California, Santa Cruz, for two years before transferring to New York University (NYU)'s Tisch School of the Arts, where he graduated in 2000. While at NYU, writer Murray Miller was his roommate.

== Career ==
=== Acting and filmmaking ===
Samberg majored in experimental film. He became an online star and made his own comedy videos with his friends Akiva Schaffer and Jorma Taccone. When YouTube was created in 2005, the streaming of their videos became much more widespread. Samberg became a featured player on Saturday Night Live in part because of the work he had done on his sketch comedy website TheLonelyIsland.com, which helped him land an agent and eventually get hired at Saturday Night Live. Prior to joining its cast, Samberg was (and remains) a member of the comedy troupe the Lonely Island, along with Taccone and Schaffer. The trio began writing for Saturday Night Live in 2005 and released their debut album Incredibad in 2009. Samberg appeared in numerous theatrical films, commercials, music videos, and hosted special events, including the 2009 MTV Movie Awards.

In 2012, Samberg delivered the Class Day speech at Harvard University, and he starred with Adam Sandler in That's My Boy. The same year, he starred with Adam Sandler again in Hotel Transylvania as Jonathan, a role he reprised for its sequels Hotel Transylvania 2, Hotel Transylvania 3: Summer Vacation and Hotel Transylvania: Transformania. In September 2012, Samberg played Cuckoo in the BAFTA nominated BBC Three series Cuckoo; and, in 2013, he landed the role of Detective Jake Peralta in Fox's (later NBC's) police sitcom Brooklyn Nine-Nine, which first aired on September 17 of the same year. Samberg won the Golden Globe Award for Best Actor – Television Series Musical or Comedy in 2014 for his role as Peralta. Samberg hosted the 67th Primetime Emmy Awards on September 20, 2015. Years later, he co-hosted the 76th Golden Globe Awards with Sandra Oh on January 6, 2019.

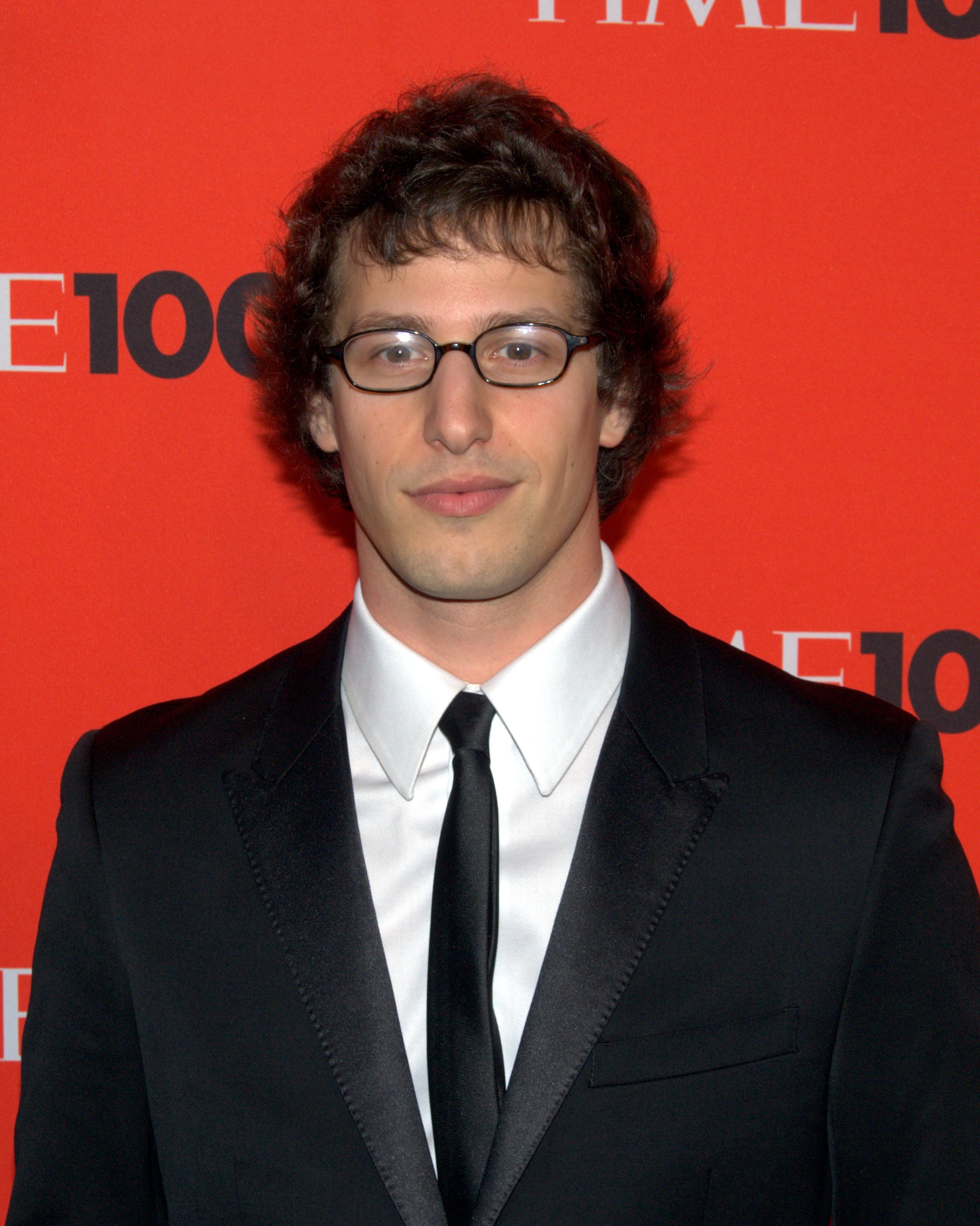
Samberg at the Time 100 Gala in 2010

Samberg starred in Sleater-Kinney's "No Cities to Love" video along with other actors such as Fred Armisen, Elliot Page, and Norman Reedus. On May 16, 2016, Samberg and the Lonely Island performed their 2009 hit "I'm on a Boat" with classroom instruments on The Tonight Show Starring Jimmy Fallon, as part of a recurring segment on the show.

=== Saturday Night Live ===
In September 2005, Samberg joined Saturday Night Live as a featured player and writer. Though his live sketch roles were limited in his first year, he appeared in many prerecorded sketches including commercial parodies and various other filmed segments. On December 17, 2005, he co-starred with castmate Chris Parnell in the Digital Short show "Lazy Sunday," a hip hop song about a quest to see the film The Chronicles of Narnia: The Lion, the Witch and the Wardrobe. The short became an Internet phenomenon and garnered Samberg significant media and public attention. Acclaim continued, especially for "Dick in a Box," a duet with Justin Timberlake that won a Creative Arts Emmy for Outstanding Original Music and Lyrics. The video for his comedy troupe's collaboration with T-Pain, "I'm on a Boat," had over 56 million views on YouTube, after debuting on February 7, 2009. The song was nominated for a Grammy Award. Another digital short, "Motherlover," also featuring Timberlake, was released on May 10, 2009, to commemorate Mother's Day. Outside of his prerecorded segments, he participated in recurring live segments, such as his Blizzard Man sketch. On June 1, 2012, Samberg's spokesperson announced that Samberg had left the show. He returned to the show to host the Season 39 finale in 2014 and to star in the 40th anniversary special's Digital Short. He later returned in Season 50 to portray Doug Emhoff in the run up to the 2024 election, as well as providing some additional Digital Shorts.

=== Other pursuits ===
In November 2023, the first issue of Holy Roller, a comic written by Samberg, Rick Remender, Joe Trohman and illustrated by Roland Boschi, was released and published by Image Comics. It is about a pro bowler who is forced to quit his dream job and return to his hometown, which he soon discovers has been overrun by Neo-Nazis, leading him to become a trick bowling ball-wielding Jewish superhero.

Samberg co-hosts The Lonely Island and Seth Meyers Podcast alongside Schaffer, Taccone and Seth Meyers, which discusses the Lonely Island's SNL Digital Shorts.

== Personal life ==
Samberg is married to musician Joanna Newsom. He described himself as her "superfan", and they met at one of her concerts in 2006. After five years of dating, Samberg proposed to her in February 2013, and they married on September 21, 2013, in Big Sur, California, with Saturday Night Live co-star Seth Meyers serving as Samberg's groomsman.

In March 2014, Samberg and Newsom purchased the Moorcrest estate in the Beachwood Canyon area of Los Angeles, California, which was associated with various historical figures: in the 1920s, it was owned by the parents of actress Mary Astor; prior to that, Charlie Chaplin rented it. The couple also owns a home in Manhattan's West Village. They announced the birth of their daughter on August 8, 2017. The birth of their second child, a son, was announced by the Lonely Island's Jorma Taccone in February 2023.

Samberg, who grew up in the East Bay, is a fan of the Oakland Athletics and the Golden State Warriors.

Samberg was raised in a Jewish family, but considers himself "not particularly religious".

== Filmography ==
Key
†	Denotes works that have not yet been released

=== Film ===
Year	Title	Role	Notes
2007	Hot Rod	Rod Kimble	
2008	Space Chimps	Ham III (voice)	
2008	Extreme Movie	—N/a	Co-writer
2008	Nick and Norah's Infinite Playlist	Homeless Man	
2009	I Love You, Man	Robbie Klaven	
2009	Cloudy With a Chance of Meatballs	Brent McHale (voice)	
2011	Friends with Benefits	Quincy	
2011	What's Your Number?	Gerry Perry	
2012	Celeste and Jesse Forever	Jesse Abrams	
2012	That's My Boy	Todd Peterson/Han Solo Berger	
2012	The Watch	Casual Wanker #1	Cameo
2012	Hotel Transylvania	Jonathan Loughran (voice)	
2013	Grown Ups 2	Male Cheerleader	Cameo
2013	The To Do List	Van King	
2013	Cloudy with a Chance of Meatballs 2	Brent McHale (voice)	
2014	Neighbors	Toga #1	Cameo
2015	Hotel Transylvania 2	Jonathan "Johnny" Loughran (voice)	
2016	Popstar: Never Stop Never Stopping	Conner "Kid Conner" Friel/Conner4Real	Also producer and writer
2016	Storks	Junior (voice)	
2017	Take the 10	Johnny	
2017	Brigsby Bear	Eric	Also producer
2017	Puppy!	Johnny Loughran (voice)	Short film
2018	Hotel Transylvania 3: Summer Vacation	Johnny Loughran (voice)	
2020	Palm Springs	Nyles	Also producer
2021	America: The Motion Picture	Benedict Arnold (voice)	
2022	Hotel Transylvania: Transformania	Johnny Loughran (voice)	
2022	Chip 'n Dale: Rescue Rangers	Dale (voice)	
2023	Self Reliance	Himself	
2023	Spider-Man: Across the Spider-Verse	Ben Reilly / Scarlet Spider (voice)	
2023	Lee	David Scherman	
2023	Good Burger 2	Himself	Cameo
2025	The Roses	Barry	
2025	Arco	Stewie (voice)	English dub
2025	Zootopia 2	Pawbert (voice)	
2026	Lorne	Himself	Documentary film
2027	Spider-Man: Beyond the Spider-Verse †	Ben Reilly / Scarlet Spider (voice)	In production
2027	The Haunting of Hotel Transylvania †		Executive producer
2027	Protecting Jared †		Post-production
2027	42.6 Years †	Ben	Filming

=== Television ===
Year	Title	Role	Notes
2003–2004	The 'Bu	Aaron	8 episodes; also writer
2005	Premium Blend	Himself	Episode: "8.4"
2005	Arrested Development	Stage Manager	Episode: "Righteous Brothers"
2005	House of Cosbys	Cosby Team TriOsby (voice)	2 episodes
2005–2012	Saturday Night Live	Various Characters	139 episodes; also writer
2008	Human Giant	Jonathan	4 episodes
2009	2009 MTV Movie Awards	Himself (host)	Television special
2009	Yo Gabba Gabba!	Himself	Episode: "Art"
2009–2011	American Dad!	Ricky the Raptor / Anti-Christ (voices)	Episode: "Rapture's Delight"
2010	Freaknik: The Musical	Chad (voice)	Television film
2010	The Sarah Silverman Program	Troy Bulletinboard	Episode: "Smellin' of Troy"
2010	Parks and Recreation	Carl Lorthner	Episode: "Park Safety"
2010	Take Two with Phineas and Ferb	Himself	Episode: "Andy Samberg"
2011–2017	Adventure Time	Party Pat, Bear, Rap Bear	3 episodes
2012	Portlandia	Andy	Episode: "Mixologist"
2012	30 Rock	Himself	Episode: "The Ballad of Kenneth Parcell"
2012	SpongeBob SquarePants	Colonel Carper (voice)	Episode: "Hello Bikini Bottom!"
2012	Cuckoo	Dale "Cuckoo" Ashbrick	7 episodes
2012–2016	Comedy Bang! Bang!	Himself	5 episodes
2013	28th Independent Spirit Awards	Himself (host)	Television special
2013	The Awesomes	Various voices	3 episodes
2013	Comedy Central Roast of James Franco	Himself (roaster)	Television special
2013–2021	Brooklyn Nine-Nine	Jake Peralta	Main role; 153 episodes, also producer
2014	Saturday Night Live	Himself (host)	Episode: "Andy Samberg/St. Vincent"
2015	The Eric Andre Show	Eric Andre	Episode: "Pauly D & Rick Springfield"
2015	Major Lazer	Dr Nerd/Dr Bass Drop (voice)	2 episodes
2015	7 Days in Hell	Aaron Williams	Television film; also executive producer
2015	67th Primetime Emmy Awards	Himself (host)	Television special
2016	Party Over Here	—N/a	Creator and executive producer
2016	New Girl	Jake Peralta	Episode: "Homecoming"
2017	Michael Bolton's Big, Sexy Valentine's Day Special	Kenny G	Television special
2017	Master of None	Nicolas Cage (voice)	Episode: "New York, I Love You"
2017	Tour de Pharmacy	Marty Hass	Television film; also executive producer
2017	Lady Dynamite	Himself	2 episodes
2018	Alone Together	—N/a	Executive producer
2018	Bob's Burgers	Brett (voice)	Episode: "Sleeping with the Frenemy"
2019	76th Golden Globe Awards	Himself (co-host)	Television special
2019	PEN15	—N/a	Executive producer
2019	I Think You Should Leave with Tim Robinson	Paul	Episode: "We Used to Watch This at My Old Work"; also executive producer
2019	The Unauthorized Bash Brothers Experience	Jose Canseco	Television special; also executive producer
2019	The Dark Crystal: Age of Resistance	The Heretic (skekGra) (voice)	4 episodes
2020	Mapleworth Murders	Bran BcBillan	2 episodes
2020	Kal Penn Approves This Message	Himself (guest)	Episode: "Kal Penn Approves Voting"
2020–2022	Never Have I Ever	Himself (voice)	3 episodes
2021	Baking It	Himself (host)	6 episodes
2022	The Boys Presents: Diabolical	Gary (Reception Guy) (voice)	Episode: "John and Sun-Hee"; also writer
2023	Mulligan	Prophet Dave (voice)	Episode: "The Easter Egg Hunt"
2023–present	Digman!	Rip Digman (voice)	Main role; also co-creator, writer, and producer

=== Video games ===
Year	Title	Voice role	Notes
2022	Tiny Tina's Wonderlands	Captain Valentine	

== Awards and nominations ==
Year	Award	Category	Work	Result
2007	Primetime Emmy Awards	Outstanding Original Music and Lyrics for the song "Dick In A Box"	Saturday Night Live	Won
2009	Primetime Emmy Awards	Outstanding Original Music and Lyrics for the song "Motherlover"	Saturday Night Live	Nominated
2009	Teen Choice Awards	Web Star	Saturday Night Live	Nominated
2009	Teen Choice Awards	Choice Comedian	Saturday Night Live	Nominated
2010	People's Choice Awards	Favorite Web Celeb	Saturday Night Live	Nominated
2010	Primetime Emmy Awards	Outstanding Original Music and Lyrics for the song "Shy Ronnie"	Saturday Night Live	Nominated
2010	Grammy Awards	Best Rap/Sung Collaboration	"I'm on a Boat"	Nominated
2011	Teen Choice Awards	Choice Comedian	Saturday Night Live	Nominated
2011	Primetime Emmy Awards	Outstanding Original Music and Lyrics for the song "I Just Had Sex"	Saturday Night Live	Nominated
2011	Primetime Emmy Awards	Outstanding Original Music and Lyrics for the song "Jack Sparrow"	Saturday Night Live	Nominated
2011	Primetime Emmy Awards	Outstanding Original Music and Lyrics for the song "3-Way (The Golden Rule)"	Saturday Night Live	Nominated
2012	Teen Choice Awards	Choice Comedian	Saturday Night Live	Nominated
2014	People's Choice Awards	Best Actor in a New TV Series	Brooklyn Nine-Nine	Nominated
2014	Golden Globe Awards	Best Actor – Television Series Musical or Comedy	Brooklyn Nine-Nine	Won
2014	American Comedy Awards	Best Comedy Actor – TV	Brooklyn Nine-Nine	Won
2014	Teen Choice Awards	Choice TV Actor: Comedy	Brooklyn Nine-Nine	Nominated
2014	EWwy Award	Best Actor, Comedy	Brooklyn Nine-Nine	Nominated
2015	Screen Actors Guild Awards	Outstanding Performance by an Ensemble in a Comedy Series	Brooklyn Nine-Nine	Nominated
2015	Teen Choice Awards	Choice TV Actor: Comedy	Brooklyn Nine-Nine	Nominated
2015	Primetime Emmy Awards	Outstanding Writing for a Variety Special	Saturday Night Live 40th Anniversary Special	Nominated
2016	People's Choice Awards	Favorite Comedic TV Actor	Brooklyn Nine-Nine	Nominated
2016	Teen Choice Awards	Choice TV Actor: Comedy	Brooklyn Nine-Nine	Nominated
2016	Poppy Awards	Outstanding Lead Actor in a Comedy Series	Brooklyn Nine-Nine	Won
2017	People's Choice Awards	Favorite Comedic TV Actor	Brooklyn Nine-Nine	Nominated
2017	Teen Choice Award	Choice Comedy TV Actor	Brooklyn Nine-Nine	Nominated
2018	Teen Choice Awards	Choice Comedy TV Actor	Brooklyn Nine-Nine	Nominated
2019	Critics' Choice Awards	Best Actor in a Comedy Series	Brooklyn Nine-Nine	Nominated
2019	Teen Choice Awards	Choice Comedy TV Actor	Brooklyn Nine-Nine	Nominated
2019	Primetime Emmy Awards	Outstanding Variety Special (Live)	The 76th Annual Golden Globes Awards	Nominated
2021	Critics' Choice Super Awards	Best Actor in a Science Fiction/Fantasy Movie	Palm Springs	Won
2021	Satellite Awards	Best Actor – Motion Picture Comedy or Musical	Palm Springs	Nominated
2021	Satellite Awards	Best Motion Picture – Comedy or Musical	Palm Springs	Nominated
2021	Golden Globe Awards	Best Actor – Motion Picture Musical or Comedy	Palm Springs	Nominated
2021	Golden Globe Awards	Best Motion Picture – Musical or Comedy	Palm Springs	Nominated
2021	Critics' Choice Movie Awards	Best Comedy	Palm Springs	Won
2021	Primetime Emmy Awards	Outstanding Comedy Series	PEN15	Nominated
2022	Primetime Emmy Awards	Outstanding Short Form Animated Program	The Boys Presents: Diabolical: John and Sun-Hee	Nominated
2023	Kids' Choice Awards	Favorite Voice from an Animated Movie (Male)	Chip 'n Dale: Rescue Rangers	Nominated
2023	Kids' Choice Awards	Favorite Voice from an Animated Movie (Male)	Hotel Transylvania: Transformania	Nominated
2025	Las Culturistas Culture Awards	Creatine Award For Straight Male Excellence	Various Works	Won
