= The Lonely Island discography =

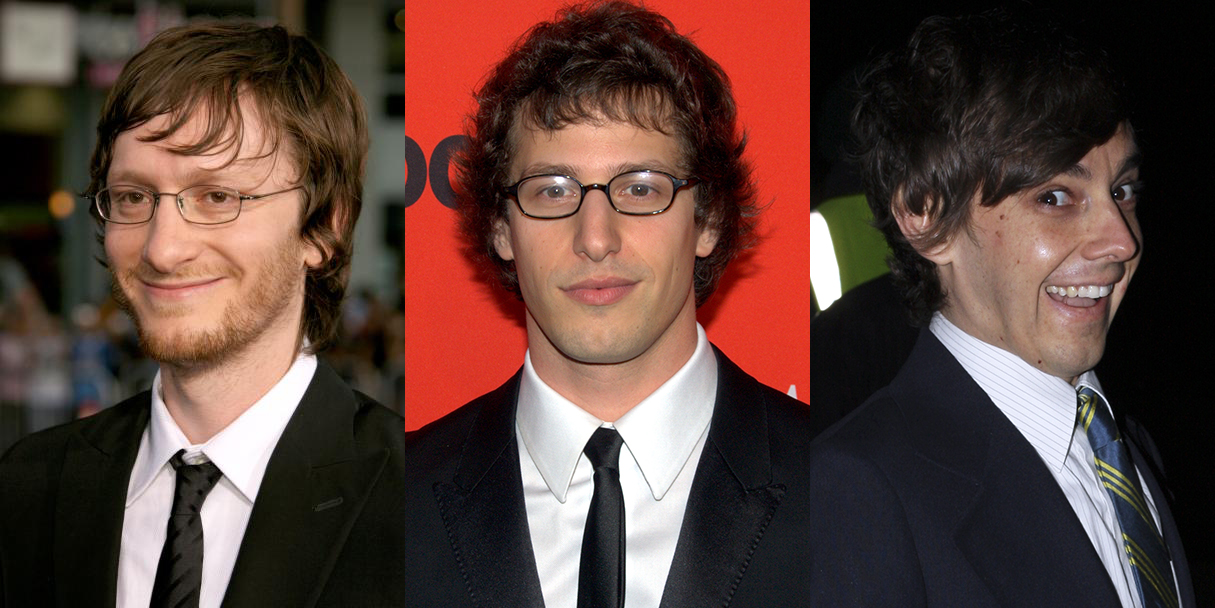
- The Lonely Island in 2010
- Studio albums: 3
- Soundtrack albums: 2
- Singles: 24
- Music videos: 36

The American comedy music troupe the Lonely Island has released three studio albums, two soundtrack albums, twenty-four singles and thirty-six music videos. Group members Andy Samberg, Akiva Schaffer and Jorma Taccone began creating live skits, comedy shorts and music parodies together in the early 2000s, having met the previous decade, during their high school years. The Lonely Island later caught the attention of television producer Lorne Michaels, who was impressed by their material. Michaels subsequently hired Samberg, Schaffer and Taccone as cast members and writers for his live sketch comedy show Saturday Night Live. Two musical shorts created by the group for the show, "Lazy Sunday" and "Dick in a Box", gained popularity on the Internet and garnered much media attention.

The Lonely Island's 2008 single "Jizz in My Pants" later became the group's first entry on the United States Billboard Hot 100 record chart, where it peaked at number 72. Incredibad, their debut studio album, was released on February 10, 2009, and peaked at number 13 on the Billboard 200. It topped the Billboard Top Comedy Albums chart and has sold 358,000 copies in the United States. "I'm on a Boat", the album's third single, peaked at number 56 on the Billboard Hot 100 and was nominated for Best Rap/Sung Collaboration at the 2010 Grammy Awards. The single was later certified two times platinum by the Recording Industry Association of America (RIAA).

The Lonely Island released their second studio album Turtleneck & Chain on May 10, 2011. The album peaked at number three on the Billboard 200 and became the year's top-selling comedy album in the United States. "I Just Had Sex", the album's first single, peaked at number 30 on the Billboard Hot 100 and received a platinum certification from the RIAA. Three singles from Turtleneck & Chain – "I Just Had Sex", "Jack Sparrow" and "The Creep" – rank among the five highest-selling tracks in the history of the Billboard comedy singles chart. The Wack Album, the group's third studio album, was released on June 11, 2013. It debuted at its peak position of number ten on the Billboard 200, with first-week sales of 28,000 copies. "YOLO" was the most successful of the album's eight singles, peaking at number 60 on the Billboard Hot 100. In 2016, the group wrote, directed, and starred in the mockumentary comedy film Popstar: Never Stop Never Stopping, and also recorded its accompanying soundtrack album, which peaked at number 69 on the Billboard 200.

== Albums ==
=== Studio albums ===
List of studio albums, with selected chart positions and sales figures
Title	Details	Peak chart positions										Sales	Certifications
Title	Details	US	US Com.	US Rap	AUS	BEL (FL)	CAN	DEN	NOR	NZ	UK	Sales	Certifications
Incredibad	Released: February 10, 2009; Label: Universal Republic; Formats: CD, LP, digital download	13	1	7	45	—	20	—	—	—	111	US: 457,000	BPI: Silver
Turtleneck & Chain	Released: May 10, 2011; Label: Universal Republic; Formats: CD, LP, digital download	3	1	1	15	—	4	31	13	40	26	US: 297,000	BPI: Silver; IFPI DEN: Gold
The Wack Album	Released: June 11, 2013; Label: Republic; Formats: CD, LP, digital download	10	1	1	39	176	7	—	—	—	59	US: 75,000	
"—" denotes a recording that did not chart or was not released in that territory.

=== Soundtrack albums ===
List of soundtrack albums, with selected chart positions
Title	Details	Peak chart positions			
Title	Details	US	US Com.	US Rap	CAN
Popstar: Never Stop Never Stopping	Released: June 3, 2016; Label: Republic; Formats: CD, LP, digital download	69	1	6	74
The Unauthorized Bash Brothers Experience	Released: May 23, 2019; Label: Republic; Formats: CD, LP, digital download	—	1	—	—

== Singles ==
List of singles, with selected chart positions and certifications, showing year released and album name
Title	Year	Peak chart positions										Certifications	Album
Title	Year	US	US Com.	AUS	BEL (FL)	CAN	DEN	NOR	NZ	SWE	UK	Certifications	Album
"Dick in a Box" (featuring Justin Timberlake)	2006	—	8	61	—	82	—	—	—	—	—		Incredibad
"Jizz in My Pants"	2008	72	3	10	—	52	—	—	35	—	109	RIAA: Platinum; ARIA: Gold; MC: Gold	Incredibad
"I'm on a Boat" (featuring T-Pain)	2009	56	1	14	—	62	—	—	9	—	199	RIAA: 2× Platinum; ARIA: Gold; MC: Gold; RMNZ: Gold	Incredibad
"I Just Had Sex" (featuring Akon)	2010	30	1	10	26	13	38	8	30	2	68	RIAA: Platinum; ARIA: Platinum; BPI: Silver; IFPI DEN: Gold; IFPI SWE: 2× Platinum; RMNZ: Gold	Turtleneck & Chain
"The Creep" (featuring Nicki Minaj)	2011	82	2	—	—	90	—	—	—	—	—		Turtleneck & Chain
"We're Back!"	2011	—	2	—	—	—	—	—	—	—	—		Turtleneck & Chain
"Motherlover" (featuring Justin Timberlake)	2011	— (Note: "Motherlover" did not enter the Billboard Hot 100, but peaked at number 23 on the Bubbling Under Hot 100 Singles chart.)	2	—	—	—	—	—	—	18	—	IFPI DEN: Gold	Turtleneck & Chain
"Turtleneck & Chain" (featuring Snoop Dogg)	2011	—	2	—	—	—	—	—	—	—	—		Turtleneck & Chain
"Jack Sparrow" (featuring Michael Bolton)	2011	69	1	64	—	54	—	2	—	6	133	IFPI DEN: Gold; IFPI SWE: Gold	Turtleneck & Chain
"We'll Kill U"	2011	—	—	—	—	—	—	—	—	—	—		Turtleneck & Chain
"3-Way (The Golden Rule)" (featuring Justin Timberlake and Lady Gaga)	2011	— (Note: "3-Way (The Golden Rule)" did not enter the Billboard Hot 100, but peaked at number three on the Bubbling Under Hot 100 Singles chart.)	1	—	—	—	—	—	—	—	—		The Wack Album
"YOLO" (featuring Adam Levine and Kendrick Lamar)	2013	60	1	31	— (Note: "YOLO" did not enter the Flanders Ultratop 50, but peaked at number 36 on the Ultratip chart.)	26	—	—	26	—	77		The Wack Album
"Spring Break Anthem"	2013	—	1	—	—	—	—	—	—	—	—		The Wack Album
"I Fucked My Aunt" (featuring T-Pain)	2013	—	—	—	—	—	—	—	—	—	—		The Wack Album
"Diaper Money"	2013	—	2	—	—	—	—	—	—	—	—		The Wack Album
"Semicolon" (featuring Solange)	2013	—	1	—	—	—	—	—	—	—	—		The Wack Album
"Go Kindergarten" (featuring Robyn)	2013	—	5	—	—	—	—	—	—	—	—		The Wack Album
"Spell It Out"	2013	—	24	—	—	—	—	—	—	—	—		The Wack Album
"Everything Is Awesome" (Tegan and Sara featuring the Lonely Island)	2014	57	—	— (Note: "Everything Is Awesome" was deemed ineligible to enter the ARIA Singles Chart; it did, however, peak at number 23 on the Australia Digital Songs chart.)	—	35	—	—	24	—	17	RIAA: Platinum; BPI: Silver	The Lego Movie soundtrack
"When Will the Bass Drop" (featuring Lil Jon and Sam F)	2014	—	1	—	—	—	—	—	—	—	—		Non-album single
"I'm So Humble" (featuring Adam Levine)	2016	—	1	—	—	—	—	—	—	—	—		Popstar: Never Stop Never Stopping
"Mona Lisa"	2016	—	9	—	—	—	—	—	—	—	—		Popstar: Never Stop Never Stopping
"Finest Girl (Bin Laden Song)"	2016	—	2	—	—	—	—	—	—	—	—		Popstar: Never Stop Never Stopping
"Natalie's Rap 2.0" (featuring Natalie Portman)	2018	—	—	—	—	—	—	—	—	—	—		Non-album singles
"Sushi Glory Hole"	2024	—	—	—	—	—	—	—	—	—	—		Non-album singles
"—" denotes a recording that did not chart or was not released in that territory.

== Other charted songs ==
List of songs, with selected chart positions and certifications, showing year released and album name
Title	Year	Peak chart positions	Certifications	Album
Title	Year	US Com.	Certifications	Album
"Lazy Sunday" (featuring Chris Parnell)	2009	19		Incredibad
"Boombox" (featuring Julian Casablancas)	2009	2		Incredibad
"Like a Boss"	2009	2	RIAA: Gold	Incredibad
"We Like Sportz"	2009	22		Incredibad
"Natalie's Rap" (featuring Natalie Portman and Chris Parnell)	2009	23		Incredibad
"Mama"	2011	14		Turtleneck & Chain
"Rocky"	2011	23		Turtleneck & Chain
"Shy Ronnie 2: Ronnie & Clyde" (featuring Rihanna)	2011	6		Turtleneck & Chain
"Threw It on the Ground"	2011	5		Turtleneck & Chain
"After Party" (featuring Santigold)	2011	24		Turtleneck & Chain
"No Homo"	2011	13		Turtleneck & Chain
"Hugs" (featuring Pharrell Williams)	2013	19		The Wack Album
"I Run NY" (featuring Billie Joe Armstrong)	2013	21		The Wack Album
"Things in My Jeep" (featuring Linkin Park)	2016	14		Popstar: Never Stop Never Stopping
"Incredible Thoughts" (featuring Michael Bolton and Mr. Fish)	2016	10		Popstar: Never Stop Never Stopping

== Music videos ==
List of music videos, showing year released and directors
Title	Year	Director(s)
"Just 2 Guyz"	2004	Akiva Schaffer
"Lazy Sunday" (featuring Chris Parnell)	2005	Akiva Schaffer
"Bing Bong Brothers"	2005	Akiva Schaffer
"Natalie's Rap" (featuring Natalie Portman and Chris Parnell)	2006	Akiva Schaffer
"Dick in a Box" (featuring Justin Timberlake)	2006	Akiva Schaffer
"Iran So Far" (featuring Adam Levine)	2007	Akiva Schaffer
"Hero Song"	2008	Akiva Schaffer
"Space Olympics"	2008	Akiva Schaffer
"Ras Trent"	2008	Akiva Schaffer
"Jizz in My Pants"	2008	Akiva Schaffer
"We Like Sportz"	2008	Akiva Schaffer
"I'm on a Boat" (featuring T-Pain)	2009	Akiva Schaffer
"Like a Boss" (featuring Seth Rogen)	2009	Akiva Schaffer, Jorma Taccone
"Motherlover" (featuring Justin Timberlake)	2009	Akiva Schaffer, Jorma Taccone
"Cool Guys Don't Look at Explosions"	2009	—N/a
"Threw It on the Ground"	2009	Akiva Schaffer
"Reba (Two Worlds Collide)" (featuring Kenan Thompson)	2009	Akiva Schaffer
"Shy Ronnie" (featuring Rihanna)	2009	Akiva Schaffer
"Boombox" (featuring Julian Casablancas)	2010	Akiva Schaffer
"Great Day"	2010	Akiva Schaffer, Jorma Taccone
"Shy Ronnie 2: Ronnie and Clyde" (featuring Rihanna)	2010	Akiva Schaffer
"I Just Had Sex" (featuring Akon)	2010	Akiva Schaffer
"The Creep" (featuring Nicki Minaj)	2011	Akiva Schaffer
"We're Back!"	2011	—N/a
"Jack Sparrow" (featuring Michael Bolton)	2011	Akiva Schaffer
"We'll Kill U"	2011	—N/a
"3-Way (The Golden Rule)" (featuring Justin Timberlake and Lady Gaga)	2011	Akiva Schaffer, Jorma Taccone
"YOLO" (featuring Adam Levine and Kendrick Lamar)	2013	Akiva Schaffer, Jorma Taccone
"Spring Break Anthem"	2013	Scott Aukerman, Andy Samberg, Akiva Schaffer, Jorma Taccone
"Diaper Money"	2013	—N/a
"Go Kindergarten" (featuring Robyn)	2013	Akiva Schaffer, Jorma Taccone
"We Need Love"	2013	—N/a
"Hugs" (featuring Pharrell Williams and Tatiana Maslany)	2014	—N/a
"When Will the Bass Drop" (featuring Lil Jon and Sam F)	2014	Akiva Schaffer, Jorma Taccone
"Finest Girl (Bin Laden Song)"	2016	The Lonely Island
"I'm a Weirdo"	2016	—N/a
"Sushi Glory Hole"	2024	—N/a
"Here I Go" (featuring Charli XCX)	2024	—N/a

== Guest appearances ==
List of non-single guest appearances, with other performing artists, showing year released and album name
Title	Year	Other artist(s)	Album
"Back in the Day"	2012	Deltron 3030	Event 2
