= SNL50: The Homecoming Concert =

2025 American television special

- Saturday Night Live episode
- Promotional image for the concert.
- Directed by: Beth McCarthy-Miller
- Presented by: Jimmy Fallon
- Original air date: February 14, 2025
- Running time: 180 minutes (without commercials)

SNL50: The Homecoming Concert is a three-hour television concert special to commemorate the 50th anniversary season of Saturday Night Live. It aired live from Radio City Music Hall on February 14, 2025, on Peacock. Hosted by Jimmy Fallon and executive produced by Lorne Michaels and Mark Ronson, the special featured musicians and music-related sketches that had appeared on the show throughout its fifty years, acting as a "kickoff event" for a weekend celebration of SNL that culminated in the 50th Anniversary Special on February 16.

== Performers ==
The Roots acted as backing band for most of the show's performances.

Performer(s)	Song(s)
Jimmy Fallon	"Soul Man"
Miley Cyrus	"Crazy Little Thing Called Love" (with Brittany Howard) "Flowers"
Bad Bunny (feat. Los Pleneros de la Cresta)	"Baile Inolvidable" "DTMF"
Bill Murray (as Nick Valentine) Paul Shaffer Ana Gasteyer Maya Rudolph Cecily Strong	"You're All I Need to Get By"
Eddie Vedder	"The Waiting" "Less than Zero" "Corduroy"
Tracy Morgan	"Astronaut Jones Theme Song"
The B-52s Fred Armisen Sarah Sherman Bowen Yang	"Love Shack"
Backstreet Boys	"I Want It That Way"
Devo Fred Armisen	"Uncontrollable Urge"
Andy Samberg Lady Gaga Chris Parnell Jorma Taccone Bad Bunny T-Pain Eddie Vedder	The Lonely Island Medley: "Shallow" "Dick in a Box" "Motherlover" "Lazy Sunday" "Hide and Seek" "I Just Had Sex" "I'm on a Boat" "Jack Sparrow" "Jizz in My Pants"
Lauryn Hill Wyclef Jean	"Lost Ones" "Ex-Factor" "911" "Killing Me Softly"
Will Ferrell (as Marty Culp) Ana Gasteyer (as Bobbi Mohan-Culp)	The Culps Medley: "Do That to Me One More Time" "Work Bitch" "Unholy" "Body" "Denial Is a River" "Catfish" "Not Like Us" "Good Luck, Babe!"
Jelly Roll	"I Walk the Line" "Folsom Prison Blues" "Ring of Fire"
Brandi Carlile	"The Joke"
Mumford & Sons	"I Will Wait" "The Boxer" (with Jerry Douglas)
Snoop Dogg	"Gin and Juice" "Last Dance with Mary Jane" (with Jelly Roll)
Arcade Fire David Byrne St. Vincent Preservation Hall Jazz Band	"Heroes" "Wake Up"
Bonnie Raitt	"Thing Called Love" "I Can't Make You Love Me" (with Chris Martin)
Nirvana Post Malone	"Smells Like Teen Spirit"
Robyn David Byrne	"Dancing on My Own" "This Must Be the Place (Naive Melody)"
Cher	"If I Could Turn Back Time"
Lady Gaga	"Shallow"
Jack White	"Rockin' in the Free World" "Seven Nation Army"

== Appearances ==
- Marcello Hernández – introduced Bad Bunny
- Kenan Thompson – introduced Lauryn Hill and Wyclef Jean
- Kate McKinnon – introduced Brandi Carlile
- Ana Gasteyer (as Martha Stewart) - introduced Snoop Dogg
- Molly Shannon – introduced Bonnie Raitt
- Adam Sandler – introduced Nirvana and Post Malone (as "Post Nirvana")
- John Mulaney – introduced Robyn and David Byrne
- Fred Armisen (as Prince) and Maya Rudolph (as Beyoncé) – introduced Cher
- Bowen Yang – introduced Lady Gaga

== Awards ==
Year	Award	Category	Nominee(s)	Result	Ref.
2025	Primetime Emmy Awards	Outstanding Variety Special (Live)	Producers of SNL 50: The Homecoming Concert, (Note: Lorne Michaels, Mark Ronson, Rob Paine, Keny aymong, Sam Kruger, Karen Scarminach, and Erin David) Jimmy Fallon	Nominated	
2025	Primetime Creative Arts Emmy Awards	Outstanding Directing for a Variety Special	Beth McCarthy Miller	Nominated	
2025	Primetime Creative Arts Emmy Awards	Outstanding Sound Mixing for a Variety Series or Special	Sound Mixers of SNL 50: The Homecoming Concert (Note: Thomas Holmes, Christian Schrader, Eric Schilling, Lawrence Manchester, Dan Gerhard, Jason Crystal, Jamie Pollock, Juan Pablo Velasco, Anthony Lalumia, Mike Bové, Cesar Benitez, Talia Krause, and Al Therurer)	Nominated	
2025	Primetime Creative Arts Emmy Awards	Outstanding Production Design for a Variety Special	Keith Ian Raywood, Anthony Bishop, and Aaron Black	Nominated	
2025	Primetime Creative Arts Emmy Awards	Outstanding Music Direction	James Poyser and Ahmir "Questlove" Thompson	Nominated	
2025	Primetime Creative Arts Emmy Awards	Outstanding Lighting Design / Lighting Direction for a Variety Special	Lighting technicians of SNL 50: The Homecoming Concert (Note: Tom Sutherland, Harry Forster, Hunter Selby, Bobby Grey, Ryan Tanker, Chris Roseli, Matt Cotter, JM Hurley, and Bob Benedetti)	Nominated	
2025	Directors Guild of America Awards	Outstanding Directing - Variety	Beth McCarthy Miller	Nominated	
