= Free Weezy Album =

Studio album by Lil Wayne
- Released: July 4, 2015
- Recorded: 2015
- Genre: Hip-hop
- Length: 64:39
- Labels: Young Money; Republic
- Producers: Lil Wayne (exec.); Infamous; Kane Beatz; TODAY; T@; Jaroth; London on da Track; Streetrunner; Myles William; 12Keyz; Reefa; Avenue Beatz; Nascent; Sakwe; Develop; Onhel; Twice as Nice; Cool & Dre

Lil Wayne chronology
Sorry 4 the Wait 2 (2015)	Free Weezy Album (2015)	No Ceilings 2 (2015)

Free Weezy Album (abbreviated as FWA) is the eleventh studio album by American rapper Lil Wayne. It was released on July 4, 2015, by Young Money Entertainment and Republic Records, exclusively on Tidal. It was released on Spotify and Apple Music on July 3, 2020, to commemorate its fifth anniversary, though some samples were changed due to clearance issues, and some tracks are absent completely.

== Background ==
On December 4, 2014, just five days before Lil Wayne's Tha Carter V was due to be released, Wayne issued a statement saying the album would not be released on its expected release date, due to his displeasure with Cash Money Records label-boss Birdman, not wanting to release the album although it had been completed. Wayne also expressed his feelings by stating he felt both he and his creativity were "being held prisoner". On January 20, 2015, Wayne self-released Sorry 4 the Wait 2, a mixtape to compensate for the continued delay of Tha Carter V. It is the sequel to 2011's Sorry 4 the Wait, which served for the same purpose during the delay of his ninth album, Tha Carter IV (2011). Upon Sorry 4 the Wait 2's release, it was noted Wayne disses Birdman and Cash Money Records, several times throughout the mixtape. On January 28, 2015, it was reported Wayne filed a $51 million lawsuit against Birdman and Cash Money Records over the delay of Tha Carter V.

On the 5 year anniversary of the initial release, the album was made available on all streaming platforms in 2020. It included the bonus track "We Livin' Like That" but is missing original tracks "I Feel Good", "Thinking About You", "He's Dead" and "Without You". Additionally, many tracks had production changes to avoid sample clearance issues."

== Release and promotion ==
In February 2015, due to Tha Carter V's continuous delay, Wayne announced a Free Weezy Album, would be released prior to the fifth installment in his popular series. In June 2015, Wayne announced he joined fellow American rapper Jay-Z's Tidal, as an artist owner, kicking off the partnership by exclusively releasing a single on the service titled "Glory". The album's cover art and track-listing were unveiled on July 3, 2015. After the album was released on July 4, 2015, exclusively to Tidal, Free Weezy Album had been streamed over 10 million times in first week of availability.

On July 3, 2020, the album was re-released on all platforms. In addition to this, multiple songs such as "Glory", "Pick Up Your Heart" and others were altered in order for sample clearances.

For the week of July 18, 2020, Free Weezy Album entered and peaked on the Billboard 200 chart at number 77.

== Critical reception ==
Professional ratings
Aggregate scores
Source	Rating
Metacritic	61/100
Review scores
Source	Rating
Consequence of Sound	C+
HipHopDX	7/10
Pitchfork	5.5/10
RapReviews	6.5/10

The album received generally positive reviews from music critics. The Atlantic positively stated, "Free Weezy Album at first seems like pure swagger. But then you realize what's really on the rapper's mind" and critiqued the first few tracks, although praised closer "Pick Up Your Heart". HipHopDX's Ural Garrett enthusiastically said, "Free Weezy Album features both that lovely stream-of-consciousness lyricism and oddly refreshing conceptual themes that made him so worthwhile. Wayne sounds like he finally gets it." Uproxx wrote very favourably, "Free Weezy Album is proof Lil Wayne is on his way back" going on to say, "invigorated by his long, drawn-out dispute with Cash Money Records, Wayne seems to have new life in him on this impromptu project. For the first time since Tha Carter III, Wayne has put out a body of work that has inspired beats, as well as meaningful content", finishing the review with "Wayne has some kinks to continue to work out, but for an artist whose name was becoming more of a punchline with each release, FWA is a huge step forward."

== Track listing ==
Free Weezy Album
No.	Title	Writer(s)	Producer(s)	Length
1.	"Glory"	Dwayne Carter, Jr.; Marco Rodriguez-Diaz; Angel Aponte; Avery Chambliss	Infamous; OnHel^{[a]}; Avenue Beatz^{[a]}	5:07
2.	"He's Dead"	Carter; Daniel Johnson; Vinay Vyas; Justin Davey; Luca Polizzi	Kane Beatz; TODAY^{[a]}; Polizzi^{[a]}	4:31
3.	"I Feel Good"	Carter; Rodriguez-Diaz; Terry Bourgeois	Infamous; T@^{[a]}	3:10
4.	"My Heart Races On" (featuring Jake Troth)	Carter; Jake Troth; Will Lobban-Bean	Cook Classics; Troth	3:48
5.	"London Roads"	Carter; London Holmes	London on da Track	3:55
6.	"I'm That Nigga" (featuring HoodyBaby)	Carter; Omololu Akinlolu; Aponte	OnHel	3:44
7.	"Psycho" (featuring Leah Hayes)	Carter; Leah Hayes; Rodriguez-Diaz	Infamous	4:04
8.	"Murda" (featuring Cory Gunz, Capo, and Junior Reid)	Carter; Peter Pankey, Jr.; Delroy Reid; Sharif Slater; Myles Moraites; Kibwe Luke	Reefa; Myles.William; 12Keyz	3:49
9.	"Thinking Bout You"	Carter; Bourgeois; Rodriguez-Diaz	T@; Infamous	4:03
10.	"Without You" (featuring Bibi Bourelly)	Carter; Badriia Bourelly; Jeroen Visscher; Vincent Schenck	Nascent; Sakwe^{[a]}	4:16
11.	"Post Bail Ballin'"	Carter; Bigram Zayas	DVLP	3:55
12.	"Pull Up" (featuring Euro)	Carter; Eufradis Rodriguez; Nicholas Audino; Lewis Hughes; Te Whiti Warbrick	Twice as Nice	4:15
13.	"Living Right" (featuring Wiz Khalifa)	Carter; Cameron Thomaz; Bourgeois; Rodriguez-Diaz	T@; Infamous	5:01
14.	"White Girl" (featuring Jeezy)	Carter; Jay Jenkins; Rodriguez-Diaz	Infamous	4:43
15.	"Pick Up Your Heart"	Carter; Andre Lyons; Marcello Valenzano	Cool & Dre	6:10
16.	"Street Chains"	Carter; Nicholas Warwar; Tarik Azzouz	StreetRunner; Azzouz^{[a]}	3:36
Total length:				64:29

Notes

- ^{^[a]} signifies a co-producer.
- "He's Dead", "I Feel Good", "Thinking Bout You" and "Without You" are removed on Apple Music and Spotify.

Sample credits

- "Glory" contains a sample from "Arise, Shine" performed by Greg Dykes and the Synanon Choir.
- "He's Dead" contains a sample from "I See Ghost" performed by As Animals.
- "I Feel Good" contains a sample from "I Got You (I Feel Good)" performed by James Brown.

== Charts ==
Chart performance for Free Weezy Album
Chart (2020)	Peak position
US Billboard 200	77
US Top R&B/Hip-Hop Albums (Billboard)	47

== Release history ==
Release formats for Free Weezy Album
Region	Date	Format	Label
Various	July 4, 2015	Streaming (Tidal exclusive)	Young Money; Republic
Various	July 3, 2020	Streaming; digital download	Young Money; Republic
