= 3-Way (The Golden Rule) =

Single by the Lonely Island featuring Justin Timberlake and Lady Gaga

from the album The Wack Album
- Released: May 24, 2011
- Recorded: May 20, 2011
- Genre: R&B; new jack swing
- Length: 2:51
- Label: Universal Republic
- Songwriters: Andy Samberg; Akiva Schaffer; Jorma Taccone; Justin Timberlake
- Producers: The Futuristics; Asa Taccone; Ryan & Smitty

The Lonely Island singles chronology
"We'll Kill U" (2011)	"3-Way (The Golden Rule)" (2011)	"YOLO" (2013)

Justin Timberlake singles chronology
"Motherlover" (2011)	"3-Way (The Golden Rule)" (2011)	"Suit & Tie" (2013)

Lady Gaga singles chronology
"The Edge of Glory" (2011)	"3-Way (The Golden Rule)" (2011)	"You and I" (2011)

Music video
- "3-Way (The Golden Rule)" on YouTube

"3-Way (The Golden Rule)" is a song by American comedy music group the Lonely Island, featuring American singers Justin Timberlake and Lady Gaga. The R&B and new jack swing track was written by Andy Samberg, Akiva Schaffer, Jorma Taccone, and Timberlake, while produced by the Futuristics with further production from Asa Taccone and Ryan & Smitty. It appeared as an SNL Digital Short on May 21, 2011, in the episode of the sketch comedy television series Saturday Night Live, which saw Timberlake and Gaga as the host and musical guest, respectively. She commented that Samberg and Timberlake were nervous about presenting the idea to her. The song was released as a single on May 24, 2011, three days after the broadcast.

"3-Way (The Golden Rule)" and the sketch received positive reviews from critics, who called it one of the funniest moments of the episode. It received a nomination at the 63rd Primetime Emmy Awards for Outstanding Original Music and Lyrics, but it lost to another song from the same SNL episode. During the ceremony, the Lonely Island performed a medley including the song. The accompanying music video, which aired on the SNL broadcast, is a sequel to the "Motherlover" (2009) sketch that finds Samberg and Timberlake reprising their roles from the skit as they sing about having a threesome with Gaga.

== Background and writing ==
In the midst of the announcement that Justin Timberlake would host Saturday Night Live on May 21, 2011, many media commentators speculated that there would be a recurrence of the two characters that he and comedian Andy Samberg portrayed in the past SNL Digital Shorts—"Dick in a Box" (2006) and "Motherlover" (2009). Speculation increased when photos of the duo shooting a music video, donning the same suits worn in "Dick in a Box", were released to the media.

"3-Way (The Golden Rule)" was written on May 19, 2011, with its recording and the music video shoot happening a day later. The song was written by Andy Samberg, Akiva Schaffer, Jorma Taccone, Justin Timberlake, and the Futuristics, with the latter producing it with Asa Taccone and Ryan & Smitty. It was released as a single on May 24, 2011, and later included on the Lonely Island's 2013 album, The Wack Album. Samberg confirmed that the song was written with Lady Gaga in mind since she was set to appear on SNL that week as a musical guest, along with Timberlake as host. "We knew we wanted to do another one with Justin and thought it would be awesome to get [Gaga] involved just to up the ante, because we had already done two", he concluded.

== Composition ==
A R&B and new jack swing song, the premise of "3-Way" follows the early 1990s pop duo of Samberg and Timberlake finding themselves invited to a threesome with a woman, portrayed by Gaga. Gaga's character invites them saying, "Hey, boys, I want you both / I hope that you think that's cool", but acknowledges that "most guys won't freak together". However, the two conclude that "It's not gay, when it's in a three-way / With a honey in the middle there's some leeway", and they should follow "The Golden Rule". The song features a reference to the sitcom Three's Company (1977–1984). Gaga mentioned Samberg and Timberlake felt nervous asking her to do the song during an interview on May 23, 2011:

I wish that they filmed the backstage scenario as both Justin and Andy Samberg tried simultaneously to pitch this idea to me and they both choked on the way in. Justin was like 'Umm so umm, we have a skit idea and umm, well I'm not really good at this I'll have Andy tell you.' Then Andy came and was like 'Well umm bluh blah we have this skit idea.' Then they both came in finally and they told me the story and I'm like, 'Guys, I get it.' They're like 'We really like each other.'

== Reception ==
"3-Way (The Golden Rule)" and the sketch were met with positive reviews from critics. Matt Donnelly of the Los Angeles Times praised the skit, writing that "Timberlake and Samberg work an intentionally cheesy R&B shtick with hilarious results". Ken Tucker of Entertainment Weekly commented, "The old-school rap details were impeccable as always", though he was unsure about the intentions of the song's lyrics. "I'm going to give [The Lonely Island] the benefit of the doubt and say the lyric was a satire of the fear of being thought gay", he continued. Nick Carbone of Time called the skit "hilarious"; he praised Gaga's acting abilities in the skit and throughout the SNL episode. The Hollywood Reporter's Aaron Couch wrote that with the skit, "Justin Timberlake and Andy Samberg may have topped their Emmy-winning digital short D--- in a Box [sic]". People's Alla Byrne and The Wall Street Journal staff both listed it as one of the funniest moments of the episode. A writer for Rolling Stone complimented Gaga's addition to the track, saying: "Gaga is a delight in this bit, and not just because she looks kinda amazing when done up as an early-Nineties bridge-and-tunnel fox. Just check out the look on her face when Samberg and Timberlake do their 'helicopter dick' routine. Pure gold!"

However, Annie Galvin from Slant Magazine criticized the song, saying the composition was comparable to that of the Lonely Island's previous release "Motherlover", explaining that it fell "flatter than most of the other songs on the album". "3-Way" received a nomination for Outstanding Original Music and Lyrics at the 63rd Primetime Emmy Awards, although it lost to the song "Justin Timberlake Monologue" from the same episode of SNL. "3-Way" debuted at number seven on the Gaon Download Chart, with sales of 42,274 copies. In the United States, it reached a peak of number three on the Billboard Bubbling Under Hot 100, while reaching number one on the Comedy Digital Tracks chart.

== Music video and live performance ==
The music video for "3-Way" was shot on May 20, 2011, the same day the song was recorded, and aired as the SNL Digital Short during the May 21 SNL broadcast. Timberlake and Samberg appear in the video as their characters known as "2:30 AM," from the "Dick in a Box" and "Motherlover" sketches. "3-Way" is a sequel to the "Motherlover" sketch. The clip begins with each half of the duo exiting the house of the other's mother, played by Patricia Clarkson and Susan Sarandon, respectively. as the mothers grab the young men seductively. Timberlake and Samberg then greet each other, simultaneously saying, "Your mom says hi. Jinx!", before they are seen in various locations around town while singing the song's introduction "yeah yeah yeah" repeatedly. Timberlake sings about his plans to have a sexual encounter with a girl he met the previous week at a Payless ShoeSource store, while Samberg reveals similar plans about "a cutie [...] who loves the way I knock on her boots". They then leave, agreeing to meet back with each other in a few hours. The two are both then seen outside of Gaga's apartment, where it is revealed that both of them agreed to have sex with her, though they did not know the other was also planning to do the same. She explains that she invited them both there so that they could have a threesome, which they quickly agree to do, citing the "golden rule" that "it's not gay when it's in a 3-way". Later, Gaga walks back into the bedroom with a bowl of cereal to find Timberlake and Samberg under the covers together, apparently not realizing she has left.

On September 18, 2011, during the 63rd Primetime Emmy Awards, the Lonely Island performed a medley of three songs, starting with "Jack Sparrow" (2011) and ending with "I Just Had Sex" (2011). "3-Way" was sung accompanied by special guests Ed Helms, John Stamos, and Maya Rudolph. Helms and Stamos were in the same suits worn by Samberg and Timberlake in the music video, while Rudolph played Gaga's role, with her same costume as well.

== Credits and personnel ==
Credits are adapted from the liner notes of The Wack Album.

- Andy Samberg – songwriter, singing
- Justin Timberlake – songwriter, singing
- Lady Gaga – singing
- Akiva Schaffer – songwriter
- Jorma Taccone – songwriter
- The Futuristics – producer, songwriter
- Asa Taccone – producer, keyboards
- Ryan & Smitty – producer
- Jason Goldstein – audio mixing
- Brian "Big Bass" Gardner – audio mastering
- Adrien Finkel – background vocals

== Charts ==
Chart performance
Chart (2011)	Peak position
South Korean International Singles (Gaon)	13
US Bubbling Under Hot 100 (Billboard)	3
US Comedy Digital Tracks (Billboard)	1

== Sales ==
Region	Certification	Certified units/sales
South Korea (Gaon)	—	146,213
