= YOLO (aphorism) =

Acronym for "you only live once"

"YOLO" (you only live once) became a popular internet slang term in 2012 after the release of Canadian rapper Drake's hit single, "The Motto". It expresses the view that one should make the most of the present moment and not worry excessively about possible consequences.

== Emergence of acronym ==
While the phrase and sentiment date back decades according to Oxford University Press, Grateful Dead drummer Mickey Hart and wife Caryl Orbach used the acronym to name their ranch prior to 1996, citing "[their] whole mindset at the time."

Adam Mesh, a contestant on the reality TV series Average Joe, produced and sold a line of YOLO-branded clothing and accessories in the early 2000s.

In 2012, the phrase was a subject of graffiti, hashtags on Twitter, pranks, tattoos, music, television shows and merchandise.

The acronym was popularized by Canadian rapper Drake, who planned to release a 2011 joint mixtape titled YOLO along with American rapper Rick Ross. To promote this mixtape, "YOLO" was mentioned prominently on several of their tracks such as "The Motto", released on November 29, 2011, with the aim of promoting the tape. This use is said to have elevated the word into prominence and common colloquial use. In late 2012, Drake expressed a desire to obtain royalties for use of "YOLO" due to the proliferation of merchandise bearing the phrase and lyrics from his song, which have been commonly seen at stores such as Walgreens and Macy's, but he does not own a trademark on the word.

Hip-hop magazine Da South reported that the rapper Lecrae has deconstructed the phrase "YOLO" in his 2012 song "No Regrets".

In the opening monologue of Saturday Night Live on January 19, 2014, Drake apologized about pop culture's adoption of the phrase, saying he had no idea it would become so big.

== In popular culture ==
A restaurant in Fort Lauderdale, Florida, filed for a trademark to the phrase "YOLO" in the context of the frozen yogurt business in 2010, and it was registered in 2012, but then canceled in 2018.

American comedy trio The Lonely Island released a 2013 song titled "YOLO", featuring Adam Levine and Kendrick Lamar, parodying the phrase and the people who use it as a lifestyle meme. The song charted in a few countries, including #60 on the Billboard Hot 100.

During the January 2021 GameStop short squeeze members of Reddit's WallStreetBets—often touted their long-shot wagers against short-selling hedgefunds with the expression "YOLO".

== Reception ==
Online media including The Washington Post and The Huffington Post described YOLO in 2012 as the "newest acronym you'll love to hate" and "dumb". The word was criticized for its use in conjunction with reckless behavior, most notably in a Twitter post by aspiring rapper Ervin McKinness just prior to his death, caused by driving drunk at 120 mph (190 km/h): "Drunk af going 120 drifting corners #FuckIt YOLO."

== See also ==
- Carpe diem
- Memento mori
