= Rick tha Rular =

- Born: Aleric Banks
- Occupations: Music producer, artist
- Years active: 2008–present

Aleric Banks (born 1985), known professionally as Rick tha Rular, is an American percussionist, composer and producer. He is the founder of St. Louis–based StarStrukk Productions, and is best known for his comedy hip hop collaborations with Andy Samberg. Rick and Monique Hines wrote the music for two Saturday Night Live skits, "Like a Boss" and "Shy Ronnie", which was nominated for a 2010 Emmy Award as part of the "Rihanna and Shy Ronnie" Digital Short.

== Career ==
Prior to the creation of StarStrukk in 2008, Rick owned the company Reel-2-Real Records, which he eventually sold to his manager, Sam Heat. Rick met Monique Hines (Foxx StarStrukk) while they were both working at Macy's, and he signed her to StarStrukk in 2009.

=== SNL Digital Shorts ===
Through a connection in California, Rick submitted some music tracks to Andy Samberg's comedy troupe The Lonely Island in 2008. Rick also produced and composed for the track "Like a Boss" which appeared on their first album, Incredibad. The song was developed into a Saturday Night Live Digital Short of the same name which appeared on SNL on April 4, 2009.

Rick_Tha_Rular has worked with The Lonely Island as a producer on the songs Like a Boss and "Shy Ronnie". "Shy Ronnie" earned an Emmy nomination for Outstanding Original Music and Lyrics He has also collaborated with "Jibbs" a Saint Louis rapper signed with "Interscope Records".

In 2011 Banks filed suit alleging that he was insufficiently compensated and credited for his work on the tracks used in the Saturday Night Live Sketches "Shy Ronnie" and "Like a Boss". In 2012 the complaint was ordered to be discontinued with prejudice.

== Awards ==
- "Shy Ronnie", Emmy nomination for Outstanding Original Music and Lyrics

== Discography ==
- "Shy Ronnie", 2009 (music)
- "Like a Boss", 2009 (composer, producer)
