= The Wack Album =

Studio album by The Lonely Island
- Released: June 7, 2013
- Recorded: Speakeasy Studios (Los Angeles, California); Downtown Music Studios (New York City, New York)
- Genre: Comedy hip hop
- Length: 45:16
- Label: Republic
- Producers: Asa Taccone; Arthur McArthur; B-Sides; Benny Cassette; Blended Babies; CHOPS; DJ Nu-Mark; the Futuristics; JMIKE; Jorma Taccone; Knoc Down; the Lonely Island; Mad Max; Music Kidz; Needlz; Rice & Peas; Ryan & Smitty; Saverio Principini; Simon Sayz; TODAY; Tommy Hittz

The Lonely Island chronology
Turtleneck & Chain (2011)	The Wack Album (2013)	Popstar: Never Stop Never Stopping (2016)

Singles from The Wack Album
- 1. "3-Way (The Golden Rule)" Released: June 28, 2011; 2. "YOLO" Released: January 27, 2013; 3. "Spring Break Anthem" Released: May 5, 2013; 4. "I Fucked My Aunt" Released: May 15, 2013; 5. "Semicolon" Released: May 17, 2013; 6. "Diaper Money" Released: May 19, 2013; 7. "Go Kindergarten" Released: May 29, 2013; 8. "Spell It Out" Released: June 5, 2013

The Wack Album is the third studio album by American comedy hip hop group The Lonely Island. Recorded in Los Angeles and New York City with producers including TODAY, DJ Nu-Mark and Asa Taccone, it was released on June 7, 2013 by Republic Records. The album reached number ten on the US Billboard 200 and topped the Comedy Albums and Rap Albums charts. "3-Way (The Golden Rule)", "YOLO", "Spring Break Anthem", "I Fucked My Aunt", "Diaper Money", "Semicolon", "Go Kindergarten" and "Spell It Out" were released as singles.

As with previous albums by The Lonely Island, The Wack Album features a range of guest artists, including rappers Kendrick Lamar and Too Short, singers Lady Gaga and Adam Levine, Billie Joe Armstrong and former collaborators Justin Timberlake and T-Pain. The album was sold with a bonus DVD, featuring music videos for "YOLO", "Diaper Money", "We Need Love", "3-Way (The Golden Rule)", "Spell It Out" and "Spring Break Anthem", as well as the one-hundredth SNL Digital Short, featuring a range of guest artists including Justin Bieber, Usher and Will Ferrell.

The Wack Album was a commercial success, although generally charted lower than its predecessor, 2011's Turtleneck & Chain. The album was praised for its comedic lyrics and for the group members' performances, but received some criticism due to an alleged shortage of original ideas. The single "YOLO" performed well on several singles charts.

== Recording and production ==
The majority of recording for The Wack Album was conducted by The Lonely Island at Speakeasy Studios in Los Angeles, California, with additional sessions for "Dramatic Intro" and "YOLO" taking place at Downtown Music Studios in New York City, New York. The album was mixed by Jason Goldstein at Downtown Music and West Hollywood, California's Westlake Recording Studios, before Brian "Big Bass" Gardner mastered the record at Bernie Grundman Mastering, also in West Hollywood. Producers featured on the album include duo TODAY ("Go Kindergarten" and "I Fucked My Aunt"), DJ Nu-Mark ("Spell It Out" and "I Don't Give a Honk") and Asa Taccone ("You've Got the Look" and "3-Way (The Golden Rule)").

The Wack Album also features a number of samples – "Dumb Girl" by Run–D.M.C. on "Go Kindergarten", "Whirring" by The Joy Formidable on "YOLO", "Gloaming" by Ludovic Decosne on "Spell It Out", "The Bells" by James Brown on "I Don't Give a Honk", "Utai 1: Making of Cyborg" by Kenji Kawai on "The Compliments", and "Universal Love" by Woods Empire on "Perfect Saturday".

Speaking about producing the single "YOLO", Needlz revealed that the song was initially intended to feature Katy Perry, and that Adam Levine and Kendrick Lamar were only added to the record approximately "a week and a half" before its debut on Saturday Night Live.

== Promotion and release ==
Following the release of their second album Turtleneck & Chain in May 2011, The Lonely Island released "3-Way (The Golden Rule)", featuring Justin Timberlake and Lady Gaga, as the final SNL Digital Short of Saturday Night Live season 36. The song is the third part of the series including "Dick in a Box" and "Motherlover", and the video stars Patricia Clarkson and Susan Sarandon. Over 18 months later, "YOLO" was released as the second single from the upcoming album, after being debuted on January 26, 2013's Saturday Night Live by featured artist Adam Levine. The song reached number 60 on the Billboard Hot 100.

The Wack Album officially announced later during Saturday Night Live season 38, with a scheduled release of June in place. Shortly after the announcement, the group also detailed a promotional video series called "Wack Wednesdays", in which a new song from the album was to be released on Wednesday every week up until the album's release. The first song released as part of the series was "Spring Break Anthem", the video for which features an introductory segment in which actor Zach Galifianakis hosts a fictional talk show with guest James Franco. This was followed by "I Fucked My Aunt", featuring T-Pain; "Diaper Money"; "Semicolon", featuring Solange; "Go Kindergarten", featuring Robyn; and "Spell It Out".

== Composition ==
=== Lyrics ===
Writing a review for the website PopMatters, Neil Kelly described the lyrical style of The Wack Album as being based on "quotable trash-talkin' lyrics, frequent profane comedic diamonds and straight-up gangsta flow"; he describes group member Andy Samberg as "the master of comedic cultural criticism, dropping honest views of social trends in the modern world innocuously amidst fart jokes and gangsta beats", and claims that a number of songs pay homage to hits of the hip hop genre, including the Snoop Dogg-influenced "Perfect Saturday". The group is said to adopt a "nerdy-outsider persona" on multiple tracks, namely "I Don't Give a Honk" and "We Need Love". Despite the comedic nature of their lyrics, some songs are claimed to be serious in message, including the gay marriage-related "Spring Break Anthem".

Writing a review for AbsolutePunk, Cody Nelson summarised the lyrics of a number of the album's songs; for example, "Go Kindergarten" is described as "a one-upping take on songs that feature lyrics directing people in the club", and "Semicolon" is said to be a parody of the setup and punchline format of many hip hop songs. Nelson highly praised the first seven tracks on the album (excluding "Dramatic Intro"), but complained that interlude "Where Brooklyn At?" marked an abrupt change in tone and interruption in flow, which is duplicated on other, later tracks. Lyrical formulas identified by Pitchfork's Corban Goble include "stretching the same idea in different directions" (namely on "YOLO") and "continuing [the group's] mastery of sending up bro culture" (particularly on "We Are a Crowd" and "The Compliments"). Consequence of Sound writer Michael Madden notes that "Diaper Money" includes lyrics about buying nappies and securing a grave plot, which are evidence that the group members have matured significantly since their previous releases.

Much of the lyrical content of The Wack Album has been compared to that of previous albums by The Lonely Island, with themes such as "nerdy white people" on "Hugs", "gastrointestinal distress" on "Perfect Saturday", and "fraught sexual relations with older women" on "I Fucked My Aunt" noted in similarity.

=== Music ===
In his Pitchfork Media review, Corban Goble proposes that "what makes The Wack Album work is the wide range of musical styles the group plants themselves in", identifying genres such as dubstep, "golden era" hip hop and contemporary R&B as prevalent on the album. Similarly, Consequence of Sound writer Michael Madden notes that "the trio ... pick and choose different regional subgenres to mimic", dubbing "Perfect Saturday" an example of G-funk, identifying "Atlanta crunk-king vocals" on "Go Kindergarten", and proposing a Freestyle Fellowship influence on "I Don't Give a Honk". Madden wrote further about "Perfect Saturday", describing it as a mix between Snoop Dogg's "Gin and Juice" and Ice Cube's "It Was a Good Day".

== Reception ==
=== Commercial ===
The Wack Album was a commercial success, debuting at number ten on the Billboard 200, with first-week sales in the US of approximately 28,000 copies. The album also replicated the success of its predecessor Turtleneck & Chain on the Billboard Comedy Albums and Rap Albums charts, both of which it topped. Outside of the US, the album reached number 59 on the UK Albums Chart, number 39 on the Australian Albums Chart, and number seven on the Canadian Albums Chart.

=== Critical ===
Professional ratings
Aggregate scores
Source	Rating
Metacritic	73/100
Review scores
Source	Rating
The A.V. Club	B
AllMusic	3.5/5 stars
Consequence of Sound	C+
Los Angeles Times	2/4 stars
NME	6/10
Paste	6.4/10
Pitchfork Media	7.1/10
PopMatters	9/10
Rolling Stone	3.5/5 stars
Spin	5/10

Media response to The Wack Album was generally favorable; aggregating website Metacritic reports a normalized rating of 73, based on 13 critical reviews. Multiple reviewers praised the group members' rapping abilities, despite the image of "fake rap" portrayed by the trio. Neil Kelly of the website PopMatters awarded the album a rating of nine out of ten, stating that "It's dirty as hell, and you're gonna laugh your ass off". Kelly praised a number of tracks on the album, including lead singles "3-Way (The Golden Rule)" and "YOLO", and claimed that only "Meet the Crew" and "We Are a Crowd" could be deemed as "filler". Pitchfork Media's Corban Goble claimed that The Wack Album was "just as good" as previous albums Incredibad and Turtleneck & Chain, proposing that the group put "a little more oomph into the songs" due to the reduced exposure on Saturday Night Live enjoyed by previous records. Michael Madden of Consequence of Sound noted that while certain "production moves, guest spots" could have been improved, The Wack Album "is the first album of [The Lonely Island's] to make clear how well they’ve grown to understand the dynamics of making rap songs, fake or otherwise, beyond basic song structure", and is also "the funniest Lonely Island album yet".

The A.V. Club writer Marah Eakin presented a mixed review of The Wack Album, claiming that the eight singles released from the album are "without doubt, the eight best songs on the record", but that certain other non-singles "don't really work". Eakin gave the album a 'B' grading, and concluded that "even with the occasional duds, The Lonely Island's hits make up for its misses". AbsolutePunk's Cody Nelson was similarly cautious, claiming that "while their third record ... may be the group's weakest effort to date, it still shows off their abilities as hook writers and as the preeminent hip-hop satirists in today's industry".

Some critics were less than favorable in reviews. Mikael Wood of the Los Angeles Times claimed that "The Wack Album feels awfully short on fresh ideas", noting songs like "Hugs", "Perfect Saturday", "I Fucked My Aunt" and "You've Got the Look" as "retreads" of ideas used on previous material. Spin magazine's Garrett Kamps had similar reservations, claiming that the album comprises "a handful of ... tracks bordering on genius, a few offering genuine yuks, and the rest sounding so half-baked they could be an ice-cream flavor", criticising in particular "You've Got the Look", "I'm a Hustler (Song?)", "We Are a Crowd" and "I Don't Give a Honk". Kamps did, however, praise songs like "YOLO" and "Spring Break Anthem", which he described as "actual biting satire". David Renshaw's review for magazine NME dubbed The Wack Album "reliable, if disposable", and joked that "It’s not Flight of the Conchords quality but, hey, at least it’s not The Midnight Beast".

== Track listing ==
All songs written and composed by Andy Samberg, Akiva Schaffer and Jorma Taccone. Additional writers listed below.

No.	Title	Writer(s)	Producer(s)	Length
1.	"Dramatic Intro"	Saverio Principini	Principini	1:21
2.	"Go Kindergarten" (featuring Robyn)	Vinay Vyas; Justin Davey; Joseph Simmons; Darryl McDaniels; Russell Simmons	TODAY	2:28
3.	"Hugs" (featuring Pharrell Williams)	Nathan Payton; Williams	Tommy Hittz	3:01
4.	"Diaper Money"	Jeremy Coleman; Ricky Witherspoon, Jr.	JMIKE; Mad Max	1:50
5.	"YOLO" (featuring Adam Levine and Kendrick Lamar)	Rhiannon Bryan; Rhydian Davies; Khari Cain	Needlz	3:05
6.	"Spell It Out"	Mark Potsic; Ludovic Decosne; Pierre Daubresse	DJ Nu-Mark	1:09
7.	"Semicolon" (featuring Solange)	Kevin White; Michael Woods; Bogdan Osipenko	Rice & Peas	2:35
8.	"Where Brooklyn At?" (interlude)		The Lonely Island	0:43
9.	"You've Got the Look" (featuring Hugh Jackman and Kristen Wiig)	Jonathan Keller; Richard Parry	Blended Babies; Asa Taccone^{[a]}	2:12
10.	"I'm a Hustler (Song/Interlude)"	Scott Jung	CHOPS	1:20
11.	"Spring Break Anthem"	Syed Shabi Naqvi; Kaywan Qazzaz	Music Kidz	2:14
12.	"I Run NY" (featuring Billie Joe Armstrong)	Jung	CHOPS	3:05
13.	"I Don't Give a Honk"	Potsic; Billy Ward	DJ Nu-Mark	2:13
14.	"3-Way (The Golden Rule)" (featuring Justin Timberlake and Lady Gaga)	Timberlake	The Futuristics; A. Taccone^{[b]}; Ryan & Smitty^{[b]}	2:51
15.	"Meet the Crew"	Benedetto Rotondi	Benny Cassette	1:57
16.	"I Fucked My Aunt" (featuring T-Pain)	Vyas; Davey	TODAY	2:30
17.	"We Are a Crowd"	Ilya Salmanzadeh	Knoc Down	1:24
18.	"The Compliments" (featuring Too Short)	Jeremy McArthur; Kenji Kawai	McArthur	2:43
19.	"We Need Love"		J. Taccone	2:13
20.	"Perfect Saturday"	Bruce Long; Simon Morel; Tommy Woods; David Crawford; Robert Russell	B-Sides; Simon Sayz	3:18
Total length:				45:16

Bonus DVD
No.	Title	Length
1.	"YOLO" (featuring Adam Levine and Kendrick Lamar)	3:08
2.	"Diaper Money"	1:51
3.	"We Need Love"	2:33
4.	"3-Way (The Golden Rule)" (featuring Justin Timberlake and Lady Gaga)	3:04
5.	"Spell It Out"	1:10
6.	"Spring Break Anthem"	2:13
7.	"100th Digital Short"	3:25
Total length:		17:24

Notes

- ^{^a} signifies a co-producer.
- ^{^b} signifies an additional producer.
- "Hugs" features vocals by Asa Taccone and Amy Barham.
- "Semicolon" features vocals by Maya Rudolph.
- "Where Brooklyn At?" and "Perfect Saturday" feature vocals by Adrien Finkel.
- "We Are a Crowd" features vocals by Joanna Newsom.
- "100th Digital Short" features vocals by Justin Bieber, Kenan Thompson, Julian Casablancas, Justin Timberlake, Natalie Portman, Michael Bolton, Jon Hamm, Usher and Will Ferrell.

Sample credits

- "Go Kindergarten" contains a sample from "Dumb Girl", written by Joseph Simmons, Darryl McDaniels and Russell Simmons, and performed by Run–D.M.C.
- "YOLO" contains a sample from "Whirring", written by Rhiannon Bryan and Rhydian Davies, and performed by The Joy Formidable.
- "Spell It Out" contains a sample from "Gloaming", written by Ludovic Decosne and Pierre Daubresse, and performed by The Noveltones.
- "I Don't Give a Honk" contains a sample from "The Bells", written by Billy Ward and performed by James Brown.
- "The Compliments" contains a sample from "Utai 1: Making of Cyborg", written and performed by Kenji Kawai.
- "Perfect Saturday" contains a sample from "Universal Love", written by Tommy Woods, David Crawford and Robert Russell, and performed by Woods Empire.

== Personnel ==
Credits adapted from album booklet.

- The Lonely Island – recording, video production, art direction
  - Jorma Taccone – keyboards (track 19)
- Jason Goldstein – mixing
- Brian "Big Bass" Gardner – mastering
- JMIKE – instruments and programming (track 4)
- Mad Max – instruments and programming (track 4)
- Joe Spix – design
- F. Scott Schafer – photography

== Chart positions ==
Chart	Peak position
Australian Albums (ARIA)	39
Belgian Albums (Ultratop Flanders)	176
Canadian Albums (Billboard)	7
Scottish Albums (Official Charts)	77
UK Albums (Official Charts)	59
US Billboard 200	10
US Top Comedy Albums (Billboard)	1
US Top Rap Albums (Billboard)	1
US Indie Store Album Sales (Billboard)	22
