= Hugs (song) =

Song by The Lonely Island featuring Pharrell Williams

from the album The Wack Album
- Recorded: 2013
- Genre: Comedy hip hop
- Length: 3:01
- Label: Republic
- Songwriters: Andy Samberg; Akiva Schaffer; Jorma Taccone; Nathan Payton; Pharrell Williams
- Producer: Tommy Hitz

Music video
- "Hugs" on YouTube

"Hugs" is a song by American comedy hip hop group The Lonely Island featuring fellow American musician Pharrell Williams from the former's third studio album The Wack Album.

The single premiered in North America on Saturday Night Live on May 17, 2014.

== Background ==
"Hugs" debuted in North America as a Saturday Night Live Digital Short on the May 17, 2014 episode of the sketch comedy television series Saturday Night Live, which saw Samberg as a host.
