= Today (production duo) =

- Origin: Vancouver British Columbia, Canada
- Genres: Pop, hip hop, R&B
- Instruments: Keyboard, piano, synthesizer, guitar, drums
- Years active: 2013–present
- Label: Artist Publishing Group

TODAY is a music production duo consisting of Vinay Vyas and Justin Davey. They are currently based in New York City and Lisbon.

Today began their careers as understudies to Grammy nominated producer Kane Beatz, and closely collaborated with him throughout 2011. During the spring of 2012 they caught the interest of Mike Caren, then president of boutique publishing label Artist Publishing Group.

== Discography ==
=== 2013 ===
- The Lonely Island - The Wack Album
  - 02. "Go Kindergarten" (feat. Robyn)
  - 16. "I Fucked My Aunt" (feat. T-Pain)
- Jason Derulo - Tattoos
  - 04. "Tattoo"
- Young Jeezy
  - "Real Niggas" (feat. Freddie Gibbs)
- T. Mills
  - "Right Song"
- Mike Posner
  - "Livin' My Life"
- Kid Ink - Almost Home
  - "Sunset"
- Zara Larsson
  - "Bad Boys Remix"

=== 2014 ===
- Nicki Minaj - The Pinkprint
  - "Bed of Lies"
  - "Grand Piano"
- David Guetta - "Listen"
  - "S.T.O.P." (feat. Ryan Tedder)
- Kevin Gates - "Luca Brasi 2: A Gangsta Grillz Special Edition"
  - "Wassup With It"
- D8
  - "Sorri"

=== 2015 ===
- Ester Dean - "Miss Ester Dean"
  - "Any Other Way"
- Casey Veggies - "Live & Grow"
  - "Tied Up" (feat. Dej Loaf)
- Lil Boosie - "Touchdown 2 Cause Hell"
  - "All I Know" (feat. PJ)
- Lil Wayne - "Free Weezy Album"
  - "He's Dead"
- G-Eazy - "When It's Dark Out"
  - "Nothing To Me" (feat. Keyshia Cole, e-40)

=== 2016 ===
- Yo Gotti - "The Art of Hustle"
  - "The Art of Hustle"
- Flo Rida - "The Perfect 10"
  - "Hello Friday" (feat. Jason Derulo)
  - "Who Did You Love" (feat. Arianna)
- Virgul
  - "I Need this Girl"
  - "So Eu Sei"
- April Ivy
  - "Shut Up and Kiss Me"
- Carolina Deslandes
  - "Heaven"

=== 2017 ===
- Kevin Gates - "By Any Means 2"
  - "GOMD"
- Wale - "Shine"
  - "Mathematics"
- Imanos
  - "Gunshy" (feat. Pusha T, Karen Harding)
- Virgul
  - "Rainha"

=== 2018 ===
- Pusha T - "Venom Soundtrack"
  - "No Problem"
- Toni Romiti
  - "Who Dis" (feat. PJ)
