= Sorry 4 the Wait 2 =

Mixtape by Lil Wayne
- Released: January 20, 2015
- Recorded: 2015
- Genre: Hip-hop
- Length: 65:41
- Label: Young Money

Lil Wayne chronology
Dedication 5 (2013)	Sorry 4 the Wait 2 (2015)	Free Weezy Album (2015)

Sorry 4 the Wait 2 is the thirteenth mixtape by American rapper Lil Wayne, released on January 20, 2015 to compensate for the continued delay of his twelfth studio album Tha Carter V. It is the sequel to Wayne's Sorry 4 the Wait (2011) mixtape, which served for the same purpose during the delay of his ninth album Tha Carter IV (2011). The mixtape features eighteen tracks, with 13 remixes and 5 original songs, along with guest appearances from Drake, Christina Milian, Mack Maine, 2 Chainz and SnL.

== Critical reception ==
Professional ratings
Review scores
Source	Rating
Exclaim!	4/5 stars
HotNewHipHop	72/100
Pitchfork	6.4/10
Section Eighty	3.5/5 stars

Sorry 4 the Wait 2 received generally positive reviews from media critics and fans saw it as an improvement compared to his previous projects. Daily Trojan described the mixtape as impressive, noting Wayne's "purpose and drive". Trevor Smith of HotNewHipHop awarded it 72%, saying "He's certainly not back, but he never fully 'lost it' either. Part of what made Wayne great has been there throughout, but it shines through more regularly here than on his last few tapes, in punchlines that can be funny and legitimately surprising."

Pitchfork gave a more mixed review but still said "If there's a word that describes Wayne's rapping on Sorry 4 the Wait 2, it's 'engaged.' Wayne remains really good at the physical act of rapping, even if now you can hear the gears lurching into action whenever he switches into a double-time flow." The review notes that "[t]here aren't any performances here that will have you dragging the originals to the recycle bin.".

== Music videos ==
A music video for "Coco" was shot and released on March 18, 2015. On April 20, 2015 Lil Wayne released a music video "Hollyweezy," in celebration of 4/20, Hollyweezy being one of the project's few original productions. A video for "Selsun Blue" was released featuring Wayne skating as well as some members of the Grizzly Gang.

== Track listing ==
No.	Title	Original instrumental / Producer (Original beats)	Length
1.	"Coco"	"CoCo" (O.T. Genasis)	4:07
2.	"Sh!t"	"Sh!t" (Future)	4:18
3.	"Trap House"	"Jumpin' Like Jordan" (Rich the Kid)	4:20
4.	"Selsun Blue"	"All About the Money" (Troy Ave)	3:36
5.	"Used To" (featuring Drake)	WondaGurl	4:23
6.	"No Type"	"No Type" (Rae Sremmurd)	4:01
7.	"Fingers Hurting"	"Maneuvering" (ILoveMakonnen)	4:14
8.	"Hot Nigga"	"Hot Nigga" (Bobby Shmurda)	3:17
9.	"Hollyweezy"	Jabbar "Bah" Stevens	4:59
10.	"Drunk in Love" (featuring Christina Milian)	"Drunk in Love" (Beyoncé)	4:53
11.	"You Guessed It"	"U Guessed It" (OG Maco)	4:03
12.	"Try Me" (featuring Mack Maine)	"Try Me" (Dej Loaf)	3:35
13.	"Preach" (featuring 2 Chainz)	"Preach" (Young Dolph)	3:01
14.	"Alphabet"	"Tuesday" (ILoveMakonnen and Drake)	5:30
15.	"No Haters"	London on da Track	3:43
16.	"Admit It" (featuring Shanell)	Avenue Beatz	4:03
17.	"Dreams and Nightmares"	"Dreams and Nightmares" (Meek Mill)	3:50
18.	"Amazing Amy" (featuring Migos)	London on da Track	5:14
Total length:			69:55
