= YOLO (The Lonely Island song) =

Single by The Lonely Island featuring Adam Levine and Kendrick Lamar

from the album The Wack Album
- B-side: "YOLO" (Sam F. Remix)
- Released: January 25, 2013
- Recorded: 2012
- Genre: Comedy hip hop
- Length: 3:08
- Label: Republic
- Songwriters: Andy Samberg; Akiva Schaffer; Jorma Taccone; Khari Cain; Rhiannon Bryan; Rhydian Davies
- Producer: Needlz

The Lonely Island singles chronology
"3-Way (The Golden Rule)" (2011)	"YOLO" (2013)	"Spring Break Anthem" (2013)

Adam Levine singles chronology
"My Life" (2012)	"YOLO" (2013)	"Locked Away" (2015)

Kendrick Lamar singles chronology
"Poetic Justice" (2012)	"YOLO" (2013)	"How Many Drinks?" (2013)

Music video
- "YOLO" on YouTube

"YOLO" is a song by American comedy troupe The Lonely Island featuring American singer Adam Levine of Maroon 5 and American rapper Kendrick Lamar, from the former's third studio album The Wack Album. The song was released as the lead single from the album on January 25, 2013, worldwide outside North America. The single premiered in North America on Saturday Night Live on January 26, and released as a single the following day.

== Background and composition ==
"YOLO"
The sarcastic lyrics of "YOLO" draw the complete opposite meaning of the "You Only Live Once" phrase.

The title and lyrics of the song reference the popular motto and internet meme "YOLO" ("You Only Live Once"), a phrase popularized by Drake and Rick Ross on such songs as "The Motto", which were intended to promote a mixtape originally titled YOLO. The phrase has since become a cultural phenomenon and has been reworked to be an excuse for irresponsible and outlandish behaviour, but most of the time it is used sarcastically in this manner.

== Recording and production ==
"YOLO" was written by all performers of the track, The Lonely Island, Adam Levine and Kendrick Lamar. Also credited for songwriting are Rhiannon Bryan and Rhydian Davies, members of the Welsh alternative rock band The Joy Formidable, whose 2011 single "Whirring" is sampled throughout the song. The song was produced by Needlz, who had previously worked with Lupe Fiasco and 50 Cent. The song was originally planned to feature Katy Perry. This was later changed changed to feature Maroon 5's Adam Levine, who was hosting Saturday Night Live. Kendrick Lamar, that night's musical guest, was also added to the song. Lamar had previously asked NBC to put him in a Saturday Night Live Digital Short or a live sketch. The premiere of the song on SNL also marked the temporary return of Lonely Island frontman Andy Samberg, who had left Saturday Night Live the year before.

== Release ==
"YOLO" debuted in North America as a Saturday Night Live Digital Short on the January 26, 2013 episode of the sketch comedy television series Saturday Night Live, which saw Levine and Lamar as the host and musical guest, respectively. Although the music video and single itself were released a day earlier outside the United States, no announcement was made until the Saturday Night Live airing. The single was released in North America on January 27, and globally on January 29.

Rolling Stone named it the 27th best song of 2013.

== Track listing ==
Digital download
No.	Title	Length
1.	"YOLO"	3:08

7"
No.	Title	Length
1.	"YOLO"	3:08
2.	"YOLO (Sam F. Remix)"

== Chart performance ==
Chart (2013)	Peak position
Australia (ARIA)	31
Belgium (Ultratip Bubbling Under Flanders)	36
Canada Hot 100 (Billboard)	26
New Zealand (Recorded Music NZ)	26
US Billboard Hot 100	60

== Release history ==
Country	Date	Format	Label
Australia	January 25, 2013	Digital download	Universal Records
Belgium	January 25, 2013	Digital download	Universal Records
Brazil	January 25, 2013	Digital download	Universal Records
France	January 25, 2013	Digital download	Universal Records
Germany	January 25, 2013	Digital download	Universal Records
Ireland	January 25, 2013	Digital download	Universal Records
Israel	January 25, 2013	Digital download	Universal Records
Japan	January 25, 2013	Digital download	Universal Records
Netherlands	January 25, 2013	Digital download	Universal Records
New Zealand	January 25, 2013	Digital download	Universal Records
South Africa	January 25, 2013	Digital download	Universal Records
United Kingdom	January 25, 2013	Digital download	Universal Records
Canada	January 27, 2013	Digital download	Universal Records
Mexico	January 27, 2013	Digital download	Universal Records
United States	January 27, 2013	Digital download	Universal Records
Lebanon	January 29, 2013	Digital download	Universal Records
Australia	April 20, 2013	7"	Universal Records
United Kingdom	April 20, 2013	7"	Universal Records
United States	April 20, 2013	7"	Universal Records
