= Spring Break Anthem =

Single by The Lonely Island

from the album The Wack Album
- Released: May 5, 2013
- Recorded: 2012
- Genre: Comedy hip hop
- Length: 2:13
- Label: Republic
- Songwriter(s): Andy Samberg; Akiva Schaffer; Jorma Taccone; Syed Shabi Naqvi; Kaywan Qazzaz
- Producer(s): Music Kidz

The Lonely Island singles chronology
"YOLO" (2013)	"Spring Break Anthem" (2013)	"I Fucked My Aunt" (2013)

Music video
- "Spring Break Anthem" on YouTube

"Spring Break Anthem" is a song written and recorded by American comedy hip hop group The Lonely Island for their third studio album The Wack Album. The song was released as the second single from the album on May 5, 2013. The song satirizes American spring break culture, which is illustrated as uproarious and irresponsible, juxtaposing it with the concept of same-sex marriage.

== Background ==
"Spring Break Anthem" was first conceived during the 2010 sessions that produced the trio's second album, Turtleneck & Chain (2011), but it was not developed fully until they began recording The Wack Album in late 2012. The original intention was to juxtapose raucous and irresponsible spring break behavior with descriptions of same-sex marriage. "We wanted to show just how ridiculous it is that spring break behavior is considered normal and gay marriage is insane when it's actually the opposite," said Schaffer. Samberg further stated that, upon viewing the music video, the song takes on another level of satire, illustrating that careless, "macho" young men that typically detest the idea of same-sex marriage, have no problem taking advantage of women while on spring break and "acting like animals," in stark contrast to the reality of same-sex marriage, which Samberg describes as "people who just want to be civilized and have rights and care for each other."

The trio performed the song live for YouTube Comedy Week, which required four takes, after which the troupe were losing their voices.

== Music video ==
Same-sex wedding planning and marriage scenes are interspersed throughout stereotypical spring break party scenes. Zach Galifianakis, Ed Norton, and James Franco cameo as the husbands to bandmembers Samberg, Jorma Taccone, and Akiva Schaeffer, respectively.

== Reception ==
The A.V. Club considered it, alongside the eight other "Wack Wednesdays" singles, as among the best on The Wack Album.

== Track listing ==
Digital download
No.	Title	Length
1.	"Spring Break Anthem"	2:13

== Chart performance ==
Chart (2013)	Peak position
US Comedy Digital Tracks (Billboard)	1
