= The Unauthorized Bash Brothers Experience =

2019 comedy special

- Genre: Comedy musical
- Directed by: Mike Diva; Akiva Schaffer
- Starring: Andy Samberg; Akiva Schaffer
- Composer: The Lonely Island
- Country of origin: United States

Production
- Executive producers: Andy Samberg; Akiva Schaffer; Jorma Taccone; Becky Sloviter
- Cinematography: Aaron Grasso
- Editors: Mike Diva; Akiva Schaffer
- Running time: 30 minutes
- Production companies: The Lonely Island; Imposter; Lord Danger

Original release
- Release: May 23, 2019

The Lonely Island Presents: The Unauthorized Bash Brothers Experience is a Netflix special by comedy rap group The Lonely Island. Billed as a "visual poem", the special is directed by Mike Diva and Akiva Schaffer and stars Andy Samberg as Jose Canseco and Schaffer as Mark McGwire. It is presented as a rap album written and performed by Canseco and McGwire in the 1980s, when the pair was known as the Bash Brothers while playing for the Oakland Athletics. It was released along with an accompanying album on May 23, 2019. It was timed with the 30th anniversary of the A's 1989 championship season.

== Cast ==
- Andy Samberg as Jose Canseco
- Akiva Schaffer as Mark McGwire
- Jorma Taccone as Reporter / Walt Weiss / Joe Montana
- Hannah Simone as Amber
- Jenny Slate as Stacy
- Sterling K. Brown as Sia
- Jim O'Heir as Puka Shell Bob
- Maya Rudolph as Val Gal
- Stephanie Beatriz as Val Gal
- Este Haim as Val Gal
- Danielle Haim as Val Gal
- Alana Haim as Val Gal
- Whitney Moore as Snow Bunny
- D. Paul Faulkner as Mark's Dad
- Dan Wicksman as Maitre D'

== Background ==
"Jose & Mark" had previously been performed by Samberg and Schaffer at a show at The Rose in Pasadena, California on May 27, 2018.

== Album ==
The Unauthorized Bash Brothers Experience

Soundtrack album by The Lonely Island
- Released: May 23, 2019
- Studio: Comedy hip-hop
- Length: 25:53
- Label: Self-released
- Producers: Drew Campbell; Jesse Shatkin; Nathaniel Motte; JMIKE; Madmax; Dillon Pace; CHOPS; J. LBS

The Lonely Island chronology
Popstar: Never Stop Never Stopping (2019)	The Unauthorized Bash Brothers Experience (2019)

An accompanying album was released the day of the special's premiere, performed by The Lonely Island.

=== Track listing ===
No.	Title	Writer(s)	Producer(s)	Length
1.	"Jose & Mark"	Andy Samberg; Akiva Schaffer; Jesse Shatkin	Shatkin; Drew Campbell^{[a]}; 1990.^{[a]}	2:25
2.	"Uniform On"	Samberg; Schaffer; Campbell	Campbell	1:46
3.	"Let's Bash"	Samberg; Schaffer; Campbell	Campbell	2:24
4.	"Oakland Nights" (featuring Sia)	Samberg; Schaffer; Nathaniel Motte	Motte	3:14
5.	"Focused AF"	Samberg; Schaffer; Jeremy Coleman	JMIKE	1:55
6.	"Focus on the Game"	Samberg; Schaffer; Coleman; Rick Witherspoon Jr.	JMIKE; Madmax	1:36
7.	"Bikini Babe Workout"	Samberg; Schaffer; Campbell	Campbell	3:25
8.	"IHOP"	Samberg; Schaffer; Jason Pounds	J. LBS	1:41
9.	"IHOP Parking Lot" (featuring HAIM and Maya Rudolph)	Samberg; Schaffer; Dillon Pace; Campbell	Pace; Campbell^{[a]}	2:34
10.	"Feed the Beast"	Samberg; Schaffer; Motte	Motte	2:20
11.	"Daddy"	Samberg; Schaffer; S. Jung	CHOPS; Campbell^{[a]}	2:34
Total length:				25:53

Additional songs from the special not included on the album
No.	Title	Writer(s)	Producer(s)	Length
1.	"Joe Montana Theme"	Jorma Taccone; Jung	CHOPS	0:35
Total length:				0:35

- ^{^[a]} signifies an additional producer
