= Bridge and tunnel =

Slang term, usually pejorative

Bridge and Tunnel (often abbreviated B&T or BNT) is a term – often used pejoratively – to describe people who live in communities surrounding the island of Manhattan in New York City, and commute to it for work or entertainment. It refers to the fact that vehicular travel to the island of Manhattan requires passing over a bridge or through a tunnel. Some use it to describe residents of the other four boroughs of New York City – Brooklyn, Queens, the Bronx, and Staten Island – but it typically refers to those who travel into the city from outside the area served by the New York City Subway (thus by car), including the Hudson Valley, New Jersey, Connecticut and Long Island.

== Etymology ==
Though the term originates from the Triborough Bridge and Tunnel Authority, it has come to encompass all people who commute from outside of New York City proper, including Connecticut, Long Island, New Jersey, and the Hudson Valley. The Oxford Dictionaries explains that a bridge-and-tunnel person is one who lives in the suburbs and is perceived as unsophisticated. However, this is sometimes also used as allusion to New York City's vast transportation system.

=== Origin ===
The earliest known instance of this phrase in print is the December 13, 1977, edition of The New York Times:

"On the weekends, we get all the bridge and tunnel people who try to get in," he said.

Elizabeth Fondaras, a pillar of the city's conservative social scene, who has just told Steve Rubell she had never tried to get into Studio 54 for fear of being rejected, asked who the bridge and tunnel people were.

“The people from Queens and Staten Island and those places,” he said.

== Comparisons ==
"Bridge and tunnel" was later adopted in San Francisco in reference to party-goers who live outside San Francisco, as a reference to this original usage. Residents of the Peninsula and South Bay take commuter trains (Caltrain or BART, each of which has several tunnels) and freeways (I-280 and US 101, which do not) to visit city hot-spots but do not actually live in San Francisco. Residents from the East Bay typically drive or take a bus across the Bay Bridge (and Yerba Buena Tunnel) to reach San Francisco, or take BART through the Transbay Tube. The commute into San Francisco from Marin County also involves a bridge (the Golden Gate) and the Robin Williams Tunnel.

In Vancouver, British Columbia, Canada, the term is broadly used to refer to residents of the city's suburbs elsewhere in the Metro Vancouver Regional District. With the exception of a handful of municipalities which share the Burrard Peninsula with the City of Vancouver, most of the region's population must travel by either the Massey Tunnel or one of Metro Vancouver's 20+ bridges - examples include Surrey and Richmond. Although the outer cities are rapidly developing and becoming more dense, this term is still sometimes used pejoratively by those living in Vancouver proper.

In Southern California, the term "909er" (a reference to area code 909) has come to have a similar, derogatory meaning for people coming from areas inland of Los Angeles, Orange County, and Riverside County, which historically had the 909 area code.

The term has been adopted in Boston to refer to young people who reside outside of Boston's core neighborhoods of Back Bay, Bay Village, Beacon Hill, Leather District, South End, North End, and the West End. Given Boston's natural and manmade geography, individuals from other neighborhoods in Boston must access the city's social center via one of the various bridges or tunnels that lead into central Boston.

In Southern Ontario, the term "905er" (a reference to Area Code 905) has come to have a similar meaning for the suburb area surrounding Toronto-proper, including areas such as York Region, Pickering, and Oshawa.

== In popular culture ==
=== Book publishing ===
- Bridge & Tunnel Books is a literary press in Pittsburgh, Pennsylvania.
- New York Times reporters Jodi Kantor and Megan Twohey described Irwin Reiter, vice president for accounting and financial reporting at the Weinstein Company, as having a "'bridge-and-tunnel' cadence to his speech."

=== Film ===
- In Chasing Amy (1997) while Alyssa Jones' friends are trying to pressure her into revealing who her secret lover is, when she reveals they're "not from around here", one friend, Jane, exclaims, "Ew, not a bridge-and-tunnel Jersey dyke!"
- In Boiler Room (2000) reference is made to a group, while celebrating Seth's Series 7 in New York, about trying to impress the "bridge and tunnel crowd."
- The movie Loser (2000) makes a reference to bridge and tunnel girls when one of Jason Biggs's character's ex-roommates calls his girlfriend by that term.
- In Nick and Norah's Infinite Playlist (2008), Norah makes a reference to Nick's being "bridge and tunnel", to which Caroline replies, "If he's bridge and tunnel, what does that make us?"
- In The Dark Knight (2008), the Joker tricks Gotham into escaping via ferry by having his hostage declare on the news that "... the bridge and tunnel crowd are sure in for a surprise."
- In Greenberg (2010), Roger Greenberg, who resides in New York City, doesn't want to go to a bar in Los Angeles on a Friday night because it's "probably full of bridge and tunnel people. Or whatever the L.A. version of bridge and tunnel is."
- In Paranoia (2013), Emma makes a reference to Adam's being "bridge and tunnel", after her attempt to lose Adam after their one night stand.
- Bridge and Tunnel (2014) is a feature film written and directed by Jason Michael Brescia, set on Long Island.

=== Gaming ===
- The term was used in the game to describe the crowd of the Bahama Mamas nightclub in Grand Theft Auto: The Ballad of Gay Tony.

=== Music ===
- Bridge and Tunnel are a New York City-based punk/post-hardcore band, with a number of releases on the No Idea Records label.
- The Honorary Title, a New York City-based rock band, released a song called "Bridge and Tunnel" as a single from their 2004 album Anything Else but the Truth.
- Holy Ghost!, a Brooklyn synthpop duo, have a song called "Bridge and Tunnel" on their 2013 album Dynamics.
- Sun Kil Moon's Mark Kozelek refers to fans of the band The War on Drugs as being bridge and tunnel people in a 2014 rhetoric song surrounding an on-stage festival incident between the two bands, titled "War on Drugs: Suck My Cock."
- The 2018 single Four Out of Five by Arctic Monkeys also features the term in the song's lyrics: "Mr. Bridge and Tunnel on the Starlight Express".

=== Television ===
- In the first season of the television comedy 30 Rock, Liz Lemon's boyfriend is referred to as being "a little bridge and tunnel."
- In the episode "The War at Home" of Law and Order: Criminal Intent, Detective Goren refers to two types that attend the particular night club that the victim did as "Bridge and Tunnel" and Military.
- In the pilot episode ("Flowers for Your Grave") of the television show Castle, Rick Castle tells Beckett that she's "not bridge and tunnel [because there is] no trace of the boroughs when you talk."
- Bridge and Tunnel is the name of an episode of Marvel's Agent Carter television series.
- In the episode "D-Girl" of The Sopranos, an obnoxious patron at a Manhattan bar calls Christopher Moltisanti a "bridge and tunnel boy."
- In the episode "Kimmy Kidnaps Gretchen!" of Unbreakable Kimmy Schmidt Titus Andromedon calls Mikey a "bridge and tunnel tadpole".
- In the episode "Victoria" of Human Target Christopher Chance tells Princess Victoria "I believe the term is: Bridge and Tunnel"
- In the episode "The Anniversary" of Red Oaks Skye tells David that an art friend of hers said he was "bridge and tunnel".
- In the episode "Citizen Ship" Of Broad City Iliana and Abbi make fun of "bridge and tunnel bros".
- In the episode "Mother of the Year" of Pose (TV series) Elektra refers to customers at Indochine as the "bridge and tunnel crowd".
- In the episode "Haven is for Real" of Future Man (TV series) Wolf says to Tiger about Haven "Tiger, this place is bridge and tunnel. Let's bounce."
- In the episode The Freshmen of Gossip Girl, Blair Waldorf tells a group of NYU freshmen "you should never be seen at a club on a saturday night, it's strictly bridge-and-tunnel on weekends".
- In the episode Father and the Bride of Gossip Girl, Blair Waldorf tells Beatrice "I have never been so happy to be surrounded by bridge-and-tunnel types" while partying at Panchito's for her bachelorette party.
- In the opening episode of season 4 of You, the main character Joe makes reference to the ‘bridge & tunnel crowd’ via his internal monologue whilst walking through London.
- Bridge and Tunnel (TV series) is a 2021 American comedy drama television series written, directed and produced by Edward Burns for Epix that ran for two seasons.
- In the episode "Mazel, Meredith" of The Real Housewives of Salt Lake City, Lisa Barlow refers to Britani Bateman's nail gems as "a little bridge and tunnel". The show's chyron translated the phrase to mean "unsophisticated".
- In the first episode of 2 Broke Girls, Peach Landis, the Manhattan socialite diva main character Max Black babysits for, tells her "Oh, thank God, you're here! There's a bridge-and-tunnel smell over by the babies that's stressing me out."

=== Theater ===
- Bridge & Tunnel is the title of a 2006 critically acclaimed, Tony Award-winning Broadway play

== See also ==
- Class discrimination
- Culture of New York City
- Economic stratification
- Elitism
- Rankism
