= Like a Boss =

Song by the Lonely Island

from the album Incredibad
- Recorded: 2008
- Genre: Comedy hip hop
- Length: 1:46
- Label: Universal Republic Records
- Songwriters: Andy Samberg; Akiva Schaffer; Jorma Taccone; Aleric Banks
- Producer: Rick tha Rular

Music video
- "Like a Boss"(Explicit) on YouTube

"Like a Boss" is a song written and recorded by comedy hip hop troupe the Lonely Island and released on their debut studio album Incredibad. The song is a parody of the song "Like a Boss" from Slim Thug's debut album Already Platinum. The parody is narrated by a businessman (Andy Samberg) who describes his increasingly outlandish daily activities as "the boss".

The music video initially aired as an SNL Digital Short on Saturday Night Live with actor Seth Rogen. In 2011, it was subject to a lawsuit from the producers of the musical track, who claimed they never received proper compensation for their work.

== Song ==
"Like a Boss" premiered as a Saturday Night Live Digital Short on April 4, 2009. In the song, Andy Samberg is a businessman, evidently in middle management, having a performance review. The reviewer asks him to describe the things he does in an average day, and does so for the remainder of the song in his trademark aggressive style, with the activities described initially being mundane management tasks but becoming increasingly bizarre throughout the course of the song. The lyrics "like a boss" are repeated after every activity.

== Video ==
The video features Seth Rogen, recording over the vocals done by Akiva Schaffer on the single. The video adds additional visuals not included with the words of the song. It ends with Samberg's tombstone being shown (which has the epitaph "He was da Best"), and a skeptical Rogen trying to confirm some of the more bizarre events with Samberg. The "bomb the Russians" part shows Samberg attacking St. Basil's Cathedral.

The video features brief cameo appearances from Saturday Night Live writers John Mulaney and Paula Pell as the worker that Samberg micromanages and the birthday worker, respectively, Casey Wilson as the woman giving Samberg the memo, Kristen Wiig as Samberg's office crush Debra, Jason Sudeikis as Samberg's boss, and Bill Hader as the man on whom Samberg performs fellatio. It also features Jorma Taccone as the man giving him the lawsuit, and Akiva Schaffer selling him the gun. Abby Elliott and Bobby Moynihan can be seen in the video as background dancers.

On the NBC broadcast aired version of this digital short, the part where Andy has a gun in his mouth and whines, "Oh fuck, man, I can't fucking do it. Shit!" had the shot of Andy with the gun in his mouth shortened and re-dubbed the line to, "Oh crap, man, I can't effin' do it. Ugh!!"

== Popularity ==
Prior to the release of the video on Saturday Night Live, the term "Like a Boss" was not often searched for or used in social context. Though it was indeed searched for prior to the release of the video, the term clearly spiked at release and peaked on Google on April 29, 2009, hitting a 100 on the Google Trend chart. It also gained popularity on social media sites such as Twitter Tumblr, and Facebook, where it became a popular hashtag to indicate one's pride in completing a task or achieving a goal. It has also led to parody videos such as "Like a Bus", where a bus is shown flying through traffic and often bad weather conditions with no regard or slowing for the bad conditions. On 22 October 2012, "Like A Boss" surpassed 100 million views. The video was featured by The Huffington Post, and TV Guide.

== Lawsuit ==
In November 2011 a production team from St. Louis filed charges against Andy Samberg and Co., NBC Universal and Universal Republic Records. At the root of the suit was the claim that Monique "Foxx StarStrukk" Hines and Aleric "Rick Tha Rular" Banks submitted the audio track for "Like a Boss" along with the audio track that would become another hit for The Lonely Island, "Shy Ronnie". The duo claimed that, through a mutual connection in 2008, they knew Samberg and submitted their tracks for inclusion in the upcoming debut album, Incredibad. The Lonely Island then recorded their own lyrics on top of the audio track to create the songs. The duo from StarStrukk productions claimed that they were never compensated properly for their work, both in money and recognition / notoriety. Banks claimed that originally he signed an agreement giving him a 50% ownership of the song, given his position as writer and producer. According to his lawsuit, he received a response from Universal Music Group that gave him only a 25% interest in "Like a Boss." Banks, however, claims that he has yet to see any sort of a royalty for the song. Another track from the duo was later featured on the band's 2011 album Turtleneck & Chain in the song "Shy Ronnie 2: Ronnie & Clyde".
