= I'm on a Boat =

2009 single by The Lonely Island featuring T-Pain

Single by The Lonely Island featuring T-Pain

from the album Incredibad
- Released: February 3, 2009
- Recorded: 2008
- Genre: Comedy hip hop
- Length: 2:37
- Label: Universal Republic
- Songwriters: Andy Samberg; Akiva Schaffer; Jorma Taccone; Adam Cherrington; Faheem Najm
- Producer: Wyshmaster

The Lonely Island singles chronology
"Jizz in My Pants" (2008)	"I'm on a Boat" (2009)	"I Just Had Sex" (2010)

T-Pain singles chronology
"Blame It" (2009)	"I'm on a Boat" (2009)	"All I Do Is Win" (2010)

Music video
- I'm on a Boat (Explicit) on YouTube
- I'm on a Boat (Clean) on YouTube

"I'm on a Boat" is a single from The Lonely Island's debut album Incredibad. It was also featured as a Saturday Night Live Digital Short. The song features R&B singer T-Pain. The song, produced by Wyshmaster, is a parody of many rap video clichés, especially the music video for the Jay-Z song "Big Pimpin'." The music video reached number one on YouTube in February 2009 and was number one on the US iTunes music video chart. The song was nominated for Best Rap/Sung Collaboration at the 52nd Grammy Awards. The Lonely Island has also performed the song live on Late Night with Jimmy Fallon with Black Thought filling in for T-Pain. The trio also performed an altered clean version for a "Classroom Instruments" segment on The Tonight Show Starring Jimmy Fallon. The song went platinum.

== History and production ==
Wyshmaster claimed in an interview that a record label contacted him asking for beats to use in a mixtape featuring a "St. Louis rapper". Wyshmaster sent a collection of "throwaway" tracks to the label, hearing back from them several months later asking to use a track for The Lonely Island, a group he did not at the time recognize. He recalled that he found out that his track was on Saturday Night Live and featured T-Pain only after a relative contacted him. Wyshmaster also claimed that T-Pain asked for and received 10% of the revenue from the track, and that he received "around 35%", but only after prolonged negotiations; a contract was not formalized until after the short aired. In 2019, ten years after its release, Wyshmaster said the track is "still doing well".

T-Pain said that The Lonely Island contacted him with the song and asked if he was interested in collaborating. Although he was initially confused about the premise, T-Pain said that after learning that it was a digital short he agreed; "They wrote the whole thing, I went and put my voice on it, and sent it back."

== Music and lyrics ==
The song features an aggressive delivery of the lyrics, which include profanity-peppered proclamations that range from the mundane ("The boat engine make noise") to the absurd ("I'm gonna fly this boat to the moon somehow"). Schaffer at one time claims to be riding a wild dolphin, and doing flips, and at another time to be climbing buoys. Samberg sings that he's "king of the world, on a boat like Leo" referring to Leonardo DiCaprio in the movie Titanic, and mentions Kevin Garnett's 2008 NBA championship finals victory quote "anything is possible". T-Pain's verse, featuring the use of auto-tune, has him claiming that he had sex with a mermaid.

== Music video ==
Directed by Akiva Schaffer, the video opens with Andy Samberg—who is sitting at the kitchen table with bandmates Schaffer and Jorma Taccone—pouring cereal into a bowl. To his delight, a coupon for a free boat ride for three falls out of the box. After pondering who will go with him, Samberg picks Schaffer but overlooks Taccone in favor of the previously unseen R&B singer T-Pain, who has apparently been sitting at the table, off camera, the entire time.

The three men are next seen atop the yacht Never Say Never in Biscayne Bay, Florida, dressed in tuxedos as Samberg announces that the boat is preparing to launch.

The video frequently shows scenes of the left-out Taccone at comparatively mundane places, for example, "at Kinko's straight flippin' copies", taking out the trash, or lifting a parking ticket from his car. The rap portion of the video places Samberg, Schaffer and T-Pain throughout the boat and in varying attire, including a flight suit (parodying George W. Bush's 2003 Mission Accomplished speech), traditional sailor costumes, white naval uniforms, "a nautical-themed pashmina afghan" and typical casual and formal resort wear. T-Pain recounted that the helicopter used to take the aerial shots, combined with the cool breeze, was "spraying so much water on us" that it made for "probably the worst video day I've ever been through".

== Critical reception ==
Giving the song four stars, Rolling Stone said it is "one of the strongest Saturday Night Live hip-hop hits since Eddie Murphy was funny." Stereogum called the tune "a 2:42 masterclass in stunting." The A.V. Club said the song "holds up well on physical media." As of April 2011, the video has been viewed more than 110 million times on YouTube alone and was featured by Entertainment Weekly, Stereogum, and G4's Attack of the Show.

In December 2009, "I'm on a Boat" received a nomination for Best Rap/Sung Collaboration at the 52nd Grammy Awards, a category held for a rhymed/sung collaborative performance by artists who do not normally perform together, losing to Jay-Z, Kanye West, and Rihanna's song "Run This Town".

== In popular culture ==
On April 8, 2016, Elon Musk tweeted out and soon deleted a link to the song after the SpaceX Falcon 9 first landed "on a boat": a floating landing platform, the Autonomous Spaceport Drone Ship.

T-Pain called back to the song on The Masked Singer when he was The Monster, With his "revealing clue" being "I got the music, the lyrics, and the cadence to take them down—whether it's in my cave, at the bar, or on a boat."

The 2009 video game Borderlands contains the secret achievement "You're on a boat!" with the description "I bet you never thought you'd be here", a reference to the song's lyrics "Never thought I'd be on a boat".

The multiplayer online battle arena video game League of Legends released a 2009 April Fool's Day teaser for a joke manatee champion named Urf. Several of the joke character's ability names are lyrics of the song including "Flippy Floppy" ("[I got] my flippie-floppies"), "Big Blue Watery Road" ("It's a big, blue, watery road!"), "Poseidon's Gaze" ("Poseidon look at me") and "Straight Floatin'" ("Straight floatin' on the deep blue sea!")

== Charts ==
Chart (2009)	Peak position
Australia (ARIA)	14
Canada (Canadian Hot 100)	62
New Zealand (Recorded Music NZ)	9
US Billboard Hot 100	56

== Certifications ==
Region	Certification	Certified units/sales
Australia (ARIA)	Gold	35,000^{^}
Canada (Music Canada)	Gold	20,000^{*}
New Zealand (RMNZ)	Gold	7,500^{*}
United States (RIAA)	2× Platinum	2,000,000^{*}
^{*} Sales figures based on certification alone.^{^} Shipments figures based on certification alone.
