= Jizz in My Pants =

Single by the Lonely Island

from the album Incredibad
- Released: December 6, 2008
- Genre: Comedy hip-hop; dirty rap; electro
- Length: 2:31
- Label: Universal Republic
- Songwriters: Andy Samberg; Akiva Schaffer; Jorma Taccone; Michael Forno
- Producer: Prime

The Lonely Island singles chronology
"Dick in a Box" (2006)	"Jizz in My Pants" (2008)	"I'm on a Boat" (2009)

Music video
- Jizz in My Pants (Explicit) on YouTube

Music video
- J*** in My Pants (Clean) on YouTube

"Jizz in My Pants" is a SNL Digital Short which aired on Saturday Night Live on December 6, 2008, and YouTube on the same day. It serves as the music video for the first single from the Lonely Island's debut studio album, Incredibad. The video stars the Lonely Island members Andy Samberg, Jorma Taccone and, briefly, Akiva Schaffer, and also features guest appearances by Justin Timberlake, Molly Sims and Jamie-Lynn Sigler.

== Music video ==
The singing is performed in soft British Received Pronunciation-style accents in the style of the Pet Shop Boys and their song "West End Girls", with Samberg additionally comparing the beat to the works of producer Timbaland. The video opens with Samberg in a night club singing as he is about to hit on a woman (Molly Sims). They head to her apartment, share a kiss in the hallway outside her door, but once she says that "she wants some more" (i.e. sex), he "jizzes" prematurely. He refuses to apologize and blames the woman for overstimulating him by rubbing his butt, before he goes home to change his clothes. Taccone is then shown in a grocery store (where Justin Timberlake makes a cameo appearance as a janitor) conversing with a check-out lady (Jamie-Lynn Sigler), but ejaculates in his pants as well when she asks, "cash or credit?" After explaining that the way she bags cans got him "bothered and hot", he tells her that he will pay by check.

Samberg then exits a movie theater when the discovery of a missed cellphone call from the woman he met at the club causes him to prematurely ejaculate again. In another scene, Taccone is seen driving a Mercedes-Benz while listening to the radio, when a song begins to play that reminds him of the check-out lady, causing him to "jizz" in his pants yet again. Samberg and Taccone then sing about how easily they "jizz in [their] pants" from stimuli such as an alarm clock, the breeze through an open window, the twist ending of The Sixth Sense, and simply eating a grape. They explain that merely being adjacent to women causes them to ejaculate, which, they lament, necessitates wearing condoms under their underpants. Akiva Schaffer can be seen in the background at various times as the disc jockey.

== Background ==
"Jizz in My Pants" was written by the Lonely Island during the summer of 2008. The comedy troupe rented a house in Los Angeles and created a makeshift studio where they would record songs. The music video was filmed in early September 2008, the week before the 34th season of Saturday Night Live premiered. The Lonely Island did not originally intend for it to be aired on the show, but the positive reactions by fellow cast and crew members persuaded them to change their minds.

Portions of the video appear in the James Franco 2010 documentary, Saturday Night, which was filmed during the December 1-6, 2008 production week.

== Reception ==
=== Critical ===
A number of commentators enjoyed "Jizz in My Pants". Jennifer Maerz of SF Weekly felt the video was "funny in a totally moronic way", describing it as "pure electro-trash" with "douchebag clothes, attitudes, and beats". Mickey O'Connor of TV Guide liked the song's "clever lyrics" which "brilliantly satirize the pompous chill of '90s synth rock.'" The New York Observer writer Christopher Rosen described the video as "awesomely catchy", in contrast to the rest of the SNL episode, which he felt was not very good.

"Jizz in My Pants" reception was not all positive, however. Jerry Portwood of New York Press compared the video unfavorably to the work of "Weird Al" Yankovic. The video did not satisfy him "beyond a few chuckles." Portwood preferred Yankovic's ability to parody current events and pop culture, dissecting "what was actually manipulative and mind-numbing about popular music and the market as a whole". He wrote that Samberg, in contrast, sticks to "safe and, ultimately, ineffective parody."

=== Commercial ===
The track sold 76,000 downloads in its first two weeks of availability. The song has gone Gold in Australia with sales in excess of 35,000.

The video was published first on YouTube along with most of Lonely Island's works. As of May 2022, "Jizz in My Pants" has been watched over 263 million times, making it Lonely Island's second-most popular video ever, after "I Just Had Sex". The video was actually uploaded to The Lonely Island's official YouTube channel twice, although it is unclear why, as the HD version was uploaded first. The HD version has 176 million views, while the SD version has about 104 million views.

== Charts ==
Chart (2009)	Peak position
Australian Singles Chart	10
Canadian Hot 100	52
New Zealand Singles Chart	35
UK Singles Chart	183
U.S. Billboard Hot 100	72

=== Certifications ===
Country	Certification	Sales
Australia	Gold	35,000+
US	Gold	500,000+
CAN	Gold	20,000+

=== Year-end charts ===
End of year chart (2009)	Position
Australian Singles Chart	100
