= Jack Sparrow (song) =

Single by The Lonely Island featuring Michael Bolton

from the album Turtleneck & Chain
- Released: May 7, 2011
- Recorded: 2011
- Length: 3:07
- Label: Universal Republic
- Songwriters: Andy Samberg; Akiva Schaffer; Jorma Taccone; Michael Woods
- Producer: Michael Woods

The Lonely Island singles chronology
"Turtleneck & Chain" (2011)	"Jack Sparrow" (2011)	"We'll Kill U" (2011)

Michael Bolton singles chronology
"Break Free" (2010)	"Jack Sparrow" (2011)	"I'm Not Ready" (2011)

"Jack Sparrow" is a song by American comedy troupe The Lonely Island featuring singer-songwriter Michael Bolton. The song and music video debuted on Saturday Night Live as an SNL Digital Short on May 7, 2011. The plot follows the troupe inviting Bolton to work on a new hip hop track, in which the members rap about meeting at a club and taking women home. Bolton ruins the group's song by instead singing choruses about the Pirates of the Caribbean film series and its antihero Captain Jack Sparrow, but, upon the troupe's objections, transitions to Forrest Gump, Erin Brockovich and Scarface.

The track was written by The Lonely Island during the production process of their second album, Turtleneck & Chain, in the summer of 2010. With an initial premise concluded, the members settled on contacting Bolton to make an appearance for the track. The trio relentlessly begged Bolton, who was initially uneasy to commit due to the track's coarse language. After recording the track, the troupe recorded a music video with Bolton as Jack Sparrow, protagonist of the aforementioned film series. The clip, on which Bolton noted the trio intended to go "above and beyond", was recorded over two days. After its initial debut as an SNL Digital Short, the video was uploaded to YouTube and subsequently attained much online popularity, amassing more than 247 million views as of September 2025. In addition to its status as a viral hit, the song has received positive reviews from many media commentators and independent reviewers.

== Plot ==
Michael Bolton as Jack Sparrow in the song's music video, broadcast as an SNL Digital Short.

The song and music video open with Michael Bolton entering the studio to meet Samberg, Schaffer, and Taccone. He apologizes for being late, as he was "caught up watching the Pirates of the Caribbean marathon". They discuss a song they are working on and Bolton says he wrote "a big, sexy hook" for it. They begin recording, with Samberg and Taccone rapping during the first verse about going to a club and partying with women. When it comes to Bolton's chorus, he begins to sing about Jack Sparrow, much to Lonely Island's chagrin. The subject matter switches back to the club in the second verse, but Bolton interrupts again, singing more about his hero and his "yearn[ing] for adventure."

The musicians' complaints about Bolton's singing are heard in the background, and they tell him they need him to focus on their song. Misunderstanding, he suggests his hook might work better with another film and then sings about being the title character of Forrest Gump, Erin Brockovich, and finally Scarface, with them continuing to complain about his off-subjects. The trio eventually give up by the end of the song and cut off Bolton, with Samberg noting that Bolton is a "major cinephile", and Bolton quoting Jerry Maguire: "You complete me!" Bolton also appears as backing vocals during the club-oriented verses, singing off-topic and unrelated Pirates-themed lines, such as "Keira Knightley", "Johnny Depp!" or "Davy Jones! Giant Squid!" The track parodies Bolton's association with love ballads, with the entire ballad dedicated to Sparrow.

== Background and recording ==
You want to work with guys like this. But at the same time I get invitations to perform at the Vatican! It could be potentially uncomfortable. And in the first few approaches some of the language was just so intense and off-color.

— Michael Bolton

"Jack Sparrow" was written by The Lonely Island during the summer of 2010. The comedy troupe, in the same fashion to the recording process for their debut, Incredibad, rented a house in Los Angeles and created a makeshift studio where they would record songs. The troupe had the premise for the song initially, and while trying to find the perfect person for the guest spot, Schaffer mentioned Michael Bolton, and according to Samberg, "our eyes all widened. We decided, in that moment, that we wouldn't rest until we got him to do it." The trio reached out to Bolton's management, and Bolton admitted that he was a fan of the troupe's musical comedy. However, he was concerned regarding the harsh language used in the first few takes of the song. "They were sending me lyrics and I was reading them and I was thinking, 'This is funny.' Then I’d get to another line, [...] and I would say, 'Nope, I don't think I could be intoxicated enough to read this line,'" recalled Bolton. The track's lyrics kept transforming with each version per Bolton's request to tone down the "intense" and "off-color" language but the trio stayed with the singer throughout due to their desire to have him appear in the song. Bolton appreciated their making his requested alterations to the song. The troupe was eventually able to get Bolton to do the song after they "begged him over and over again until he finally cracked," according to Andy Samberg. Bolton's portions of the song still include one use of the words "fuck" and "pussy", both quotes from Scarface.

Bolton recorded his vocals for the track on a night off in Atlanta, with instructions from The Lonely Island through Skype.

Following the shoot, Bolton posted a message to his website: "Working with Andy, Akiva and Jorma on the Jack Sparrow digital short was one of the highlights of my career and most memorable experiences of my life. For the few people on the planet who might not know, these guys are brilliant, funny and beyond super talented. They made me do things I never would have expected to be comfortable with and I'm so glad I did. Truly grateful to be a part of this project and CANNOT WAIT for the chance to work with the guys again. Now Back To The Good Part." (The last sentence is a reference to the phrase sung in the video where Bolton pops into frame wearing a pirate hat, again hijacking the Lonely Island club theme.)

== Release ==
The song and music video debuted on Saturday Night Live as an SNL Digital Short on May 7, 2011. Bolton's appearance in the song counts as his first Saturday Night Live appearance since 1991. The song was released as a digital single through the iTunes Store shortly afterwards, and the music video uploaded to both The Lonely Island's official website and YouTube. On May 9, less than two full days after the video premiered, the video had attracted nearly 1 million views and was the "number one most discussed" comedy video worldwide according to YouTube statistics.

The song received favorable critical reception from most media commentators. Mikael Wood of the Los Angeles Times called "Jack Sparrow" the sharpest comedy from Turtleneck & Chain, writing that Bolton's "patented power-soul singing blurs the distinction between the silly and the sublime." Jillian Mapes of Billboard called Bolton's guest appearance in "Jack Sparrow" the best moment of that night's Saturday Night Live.

== Music video ==
The song's music video was shot over two days, with what Bolton called a "tremendous amount of energy and focus". The video's filming took place for 16 to 18 hours each day, and crane shots of Bolton on the beach were filmed at Brighton Beach, Brooklyn. Bolton later said that he felt uncomfortable about dressing up in drag as Julia Roberts in Erin Brockovich, and that he was "terrified to look in the mirror".

Bolton appears in costume as Jack Sparrow for a great deal of the video, complete with Sparrow's signature red bandanna, heavy eyeliner and goatee. The music video featured models Jenny Albright in the club scene, as well as Kate Bock as Elvira Hancock, Tony Montana's wife, and Danish singer Amalie Bruun as Jenny Curran, Forrest Gump's wife. The opening lyrics from The Lonely Island's song "Trouble on Dookie Island" can be heard at the start of the video.

== Songs of Cinema Version ==
Another version of the song can be found on Bolton's album Songs of Cinema, based on his take on the lyrics. The song includes new lyrics towards the end to replace the attempts to move on to other movies. During Bolton's 2018 Netflix special Michael Bolton's Big, Sexy Valentine's Day Special, he performed an unplugged version of the song.

== Charts ==
=== Weekly charts ===
Chart (2011)	Peak position
Australia (ARIA)	64
Canada Hot 100 (Billboard)	54
Norway (VG-lista)	2
Sweden (Sverigetopplistan)	6
UK Singles (The Official Charts Company)	133
US Billboard Hot 100	69

=== Year-end charts ===
Chart (2011)	Position
Sweden (Sverigetopplistan)	40

== Certifications ==
Region	Certification	Certified units/sales
Sweden (GLF)	2× Platinum	80,000^{‡}
Streaming
Denmark (IFPI Danmark)	Gold	450,000^{†}
^{‡} Sales+streaming figures based on certification alone.^{†} Streaming-only figures based on certification alone.
