= Incredibad =

Studio album by The Lonely Island
- Released: February 10, 2009
- Recorded: 2005–2008
- Genre: Comedy hip hop
- Length: 42:10
- Labels: Universal Republic; 179 690 (CD-DVD); 179 765 (vinyl)
- Producers: Jorma Taccone; J-Zone; Prime; Wyshmaster; Asa Taccone; Matthew Compton; Drew Campbell; Rick tha Rular; Mansur; Sly & Robbie; Katreese Barnes; DJ Nu-Mark

The Lonely Island chronology
Incredibad (2009)	Turtleneck & Chain (2011)

Singles from Incredibad
- 1. "Lazy Sunday" Released: December 17, 2005; 2. "Dick in a Box" Released: December 16, 2006; 3. "Jizz in My Pants" Released: December 6, 2008; 4. "I'm on a Boat" Released: February 7, 2009; 5. "Like a Boss" Released: April 4, 2009

Incredibad is the debut studio album of the American comedy troupe The Lonely Island, released on February 10, 2009, through Universal Republic Records. Composed of writers and childhood best friends Andy Samberg, Akiva Schaffer, and Jorma Taccone, the album consists of hip hop-inspired comedy songs and skits with a satirical slant on traditional hip hop culture.

The album is largely composed of tracks composed by the troupe for broadcast on NBC's Saturday Night Live. Samberg was hired as a cast member, with Schaffer and Taccone as writers for the series in late 2005. After the quick production and national success of "Lazy Sunday", the comedians began writing and recording tracks for their debut album.

Collaborators on the album include T-Pain, Norah Jones, Jack Black, E-40, Julian Casablancas, Sly & Robbie, DJ Nu-Mark, J-Zone, Natalie Portman, Chris Parnell, and Justin Timberlake.

== Background ==
The comedy group was formed by the three friends while in junior high school in the mid-1990s in Berkeley, California. By the turn of the millennium, the three struggling comedy writers graduated from college and created a website, the Lonely Island, to house their self-produced skits and video experiments. Their short movies included everything from cartoons assembled from clips of old Nintendo games to satirical rap videos in the styles of their favorite hip-hop artists. "Honestly, almost every single one of the films was done at like 4 in the morning, kind of drunk," recalled Taccone. The Internet allowed the three to develop their comic voices without the pressure of having to deliver professionally polished work. The videos provided the team with new opportunities: they landed an agent and pilot deals with Comedy Central and Fox, after which the group relocated to New York City. The three soon landed writing jobs for the 2005 MTV Movie Awards. Hosted by Saturday Night Live alum Jimmy Fallon, Fallon was impressed by the group's material and recommended them to Lorne Michaels, creator and executive producer of Saturday Night Live. The group spent four days frantically writing in preparation for Samberg's audition as a cast member, which he "nailed". "There were about three days where we were facing the possibility that we might have to split up," said Samberg. "It was the biggest relief ever." In September 2005, Andy Samberg joined the cast of the show for its 31st season, with Schaffer and Taccone hired as writers for the series. Samberg became a rookie on the show, toiling long hours to earn a spot in a skit or two.

Along with cast member Chris Parnell, the group wrote "Lazy Sunday" on the evening of December 12, 2005. They recorded the following night in the office The Lonely Island occupied together, using a laptop Taccone bought on Craigslist. Whilst colleagues were rehearsing and rewriting that Saturday's show, the group spent the morning of December 15 shooting their video with a borrowed camera. The video was shot around Manhattan using multiple low-budget techniques. Schaffer spent the entire next night (into the morning) editing the video and working with technicians to bring it up to broadcast standards. In the moments preceding the show's live performance and broadcast, the team learned from Michaels that "Lazy Sunday" would be shown on that night's show. The three comedians were very worried about how the video would be received by the studio audience, but were relieved when the episode received a positive response. By the next morning, the video was a national cultural sensation, with congratulatory phone calls delivered from friends for "breathing fresh air" into the show. The rap began to be played on radio stations and in bars, bringing the group to superstardom overnight. When "Lazy Sunday" first aired, the group was basically unknown to even the show's most devout fans, but afterward, was given national exposure.

== Development and release ==
Many of the songs on the album debuted on Saturday Night Live as SNL Digital Shorts. The tracks that originally premiered as digital shorts on the show were licensed to Universal Republic from NBC and Broadway Video, although Universal Music retains phonographic copyright of these works. The music videos for songs "Lazy Sunday", "Like a Boss", "Jizz in My Pants", "I'm on a Boat", "We Like Sportz", "Boombox", and "Dick in a Box" are all available for viewing in HD on YouTube. The album is also available on vinyl. iTunes and YouTube are the primary distributors of the album's accompanying music videos.

Prior to the album's release, "Jizz in My Pants" sold 76,000 downloads in its first two weeks of availability.

The song "Iran So Far", featuring Adam Levine, was supposed to be the 18th track of the album, but the rights could not be secured because of the Aphex Twin sample used in the track. About this, Taccone said,

There were some sample-clearance issues. For that song I sampled..."Avril 14th," and his publishing company [Chrysalis Music Publishing (ASCAP)] wouldn't give us the rights. They cleared it for SNL. If we ever make a Best of SNL Shorts DVD, we can put it on there, it can be on repeats of SNL, but it wasn't cleared for the album. [The company] asked for an outrageous amount of money.

Samberg added, "For the record, Aphex Twin was super cool about the whole thing. It was the label [Warp Records]." The Lonely Island once considered doing some live appearances to promote the album but scheduling around Saturday Night Live was a challenge because it took priority.

== Critical reception ==
Professional ratings
Aggregate scores
Source	Rating
Metacritic	68/100
Review scores
Source	Rating
Allmusic	4/5 stars
The A.V. Club	B
Robert Christgau	A−
The New York Times	(favorable)
NME	6/10 stars
Paste	8.6/10 stars
Pitchfork Media	7.7/10 stars
PopMatters	4/10 stars
Rolling Stone	3/5 stars

The New York Times gave the album a positive review, including the album on its Critics Choice list of the week, only taking issue with the group's no-fi pre-Saturday Night Live material. Rolling Stone gave the album three out of five stars, calling it "the new frontier of 'White and Nerdy'." All Music gave the album four out of five stars, calling it a "fully committed comedy album...that's just as hip, inventive, and inappropriate as [the group's] digital shorts." Billboard magazine said the album shows the band's "deft handle on musical parody." The New York Observer remarked that the album "manages to avoid most of the pratfalls inherent within the genre," and called the music "wildly catchy," although it did acknowledge that "most of it has been heard before" making it less desirable to buy. Hip Hop DX said that "as a comedic display, Incredibad comes pretty close to impeccable; as a proper album it's less rewarding," and concluded by saying, "It's nice that someone finally cares enough about [hip hop] music to mock it properly."

== Track listing ==
CD
No.	Title	Writer(s)	Producer(s)	Length
1.	"Who Said We're Wack?" (Intro)	Andy Samberg; Akiva Schaffer; Jorma Taccone	J. Taccone	1:16
2.	"Santana DVX" (featuring E-40)	Samberg; Schaffer; J. Taccone; Earl Stevens; Udo Lindenberg; Jean-Jacques Kravetz	J-Zone	2:35
3.	"Jizz in My Pants"	Samberg; Schaffer; J. Taccone; Michael Forno	Prime	2:31
4.	"I'm on a Boat" (featuring T-Pain)	Samberg; Schaffer; J. Taccone; Adam Cherrington; Faheem Najm	Wyshmaster	2:36
5.	"Sax Man" (featuring Jack Black)	Samberg; Schaffer; J. Taccone; Matthew Compton	Asa Taccone; Compton	2:07
6.	"Lazy Sunday" (featuring Chris Parnell)	Samberg; Schaffer; J. Taccone	J. Taccone	2:20
7.	"Normal Guy" (Skit)	Samberg; Schaffer; J. Taccone	J. Taccone	1:04
8.	"Boombox" (featuring Julian Casablancas)	Samberg; Schaffer; J. Taccone; Drew Campbell; A. Taccone	Campbell; A. Taccone	3:13
9.	"Shrooms" (Skit)	Samberg; Schaffer; J. Taccone; Campbell	Campbell	0:34
10.	"Like a Boss"	Samberg; Schaffer; J. Taccone; Aleric Banks	Rick tha Rular	1:47
11.	"We Like Sportz"	Samberg; Schaffer; J. Taccone	J. Taccone	2:03
12.	"Dreamgirl" (featuring Norah Jones)	Samberg; Schaffer; J. Taccone; Mansur Zafr	Mansur	3:13
13.	"Ras Trent"	Samberg; Schaffer; J. Taccone; D. Carey; Sly Dunbar; Robbie Shakespeare	Sly and Robbie	2:05
14.	"Dick in a Box" (featuring Justin Timberlake)	Samberg; Schaffer; J. Taccone; A. Taccone; Justin Timberlake; Katreese Barnes	J. Taccone; Barnes; A. Taccone	2:41
15.	"The Old Saloon" (Skit)	Samberg; Schaffer; J. Taccone; Mark Potsic	DJ Nu-Mark	1:05
16.	"Punch You in the Jeans"	Samberg; Schaffer; J. Taccone; Potsic	DJ Nu-Mark	2:46
17.	"Space Olympics"	Samberg; Schaffer; J. Taccone; Campbell	Campbell	2:55
18.	"Natalie's Rap" (featuring Natalie Portman and Chris Parnell)	Samberg; Schaffer; J. Taccone; A. Taccone	A. Taccone	2:26
19.	"Incredibad"	Samberg; Schaffer; J. Taccone; Roy Hammond; Jerry Fuller	J. Taccone	2:54

DVD
No.	Title	Writer(s)	Length
1.	"Jizz in My Pants"	Samberg; Schaffer; J. Taccone; Forno	2:32
2.	"Just 2 Guyz"	Samberg; Schaffer; J. Taccone	2:07
3.	"Lazy Sunday" (featuring Chris Parnell)	Samberg; Schaffer; J. Taccone	2:22
4.	"Ras Trent"	Samberg; Schaffer; J. Taccone; Carey; Dunbar; Shakespeare	2:08
5.	"Dick in a Box" (featuring Justin Timberlake)	Samberg; Schaffer; J. Taccone; A. Taccone; Timberlake; Barnes	2:41
6.	"We Like Sportz"	Samberg; Schaffer; J. Taccone	2:06
7.	"Space Olympics"	Samberg; Schaffer; J. Taccone; Campbell	3:01
8.	"Bing Bong Brothers"	Samberg; Schaffer; J. Taccone	1:12

== Parody sources ==
- "Bing Bong Bros." is a parody of "Wait (The Whisper Song)" by the Ying Yang Twins.
- "Natalie's Rap" is a parody of Eazy-E's song, "No More ?'s", from his album, Eazy-Duz-It.
- "Like a Boss" is a parody of Slim Thug's song, "Like a Boss", from his album, Already Platinum.

== Chart position ==
The album debuted on the Billboard 200 album chart at No. 13, with first week sales of 48,000.

It was the eighth-best-selling rap album of 2009 and sold 246,000 copies.

=== Weekly charts ===
Chart (2009)	Providers	Peak position
U.S. Billboard 200	Billboard	13
Top Rap Albums	Billboard	7
Australian ARIA Albums Chart	ARIA	45

=== Year-end ===
Chart (2009)	Rank
US Billboard 200	134
US Comedy Albums (Billboard)	1

Chart (2010)	Rank
US Comedy Albums (Billboard)	1

== Certifications ==
Sales certification for "Incredibad"
Region	Certification	Certified units/sales
United Kingdom (BPI)	Silver	60,000^{‡}
^{‡} Sales+streaming figures based on certification alone.
