= The Lonely Island =

American comedy troupe

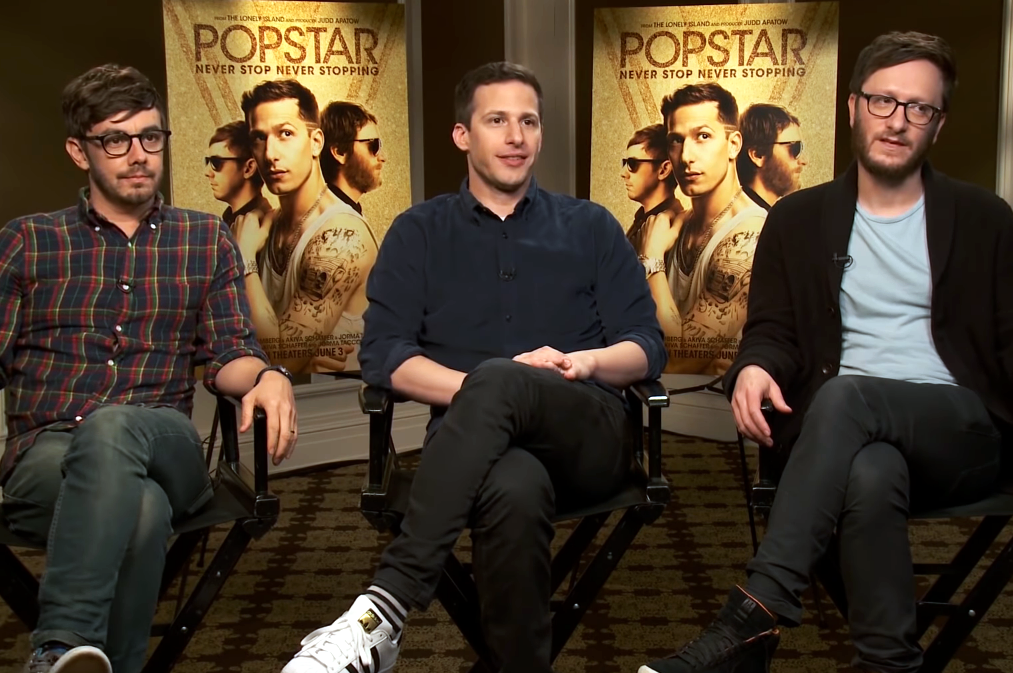
- From left to right: Jorma Taccone, Andy Samberg and Akiva Schaffer in 2016

Comedy career
- Years active: 2001–present
- Medium: Television; music; film; internet
- Genres: Musical comedy; sketch comedy; satire; surreal humor; off-color humor
- Members: Andy Samberg; Akiva Schaffer; Jorma Taccone
- Musical career
- Origin: Berkeley, California, U.S.
- Genre: Comedy hip hop
- Labels: Republic; Universal Republic
- Website: thelonelyisland.com

The Lonely Island is an American comedy trio formed by Andy Samberg, Jorma Taccone, and Akiva Schaffer in Berkeley, California in 2001. They have written for and starred in the American TV program Saturday Night Live (SNL).

The three first met in junior high. After graduating from college, they regrouped and moved to Los Angeles, where they struggled to find work and began making short films, combining absurdist comedy and occasionally music. Among the first performers to post their material on the Internet, they involved themselves with Channel 101, a non-profit monthly short film festival. Their popularity at the screenings led to unsuccessful pilot deals with Fox and Comedy Central and a writing job for the 2005 MTV Movie Awards. Subsequently, that show's host, Jimmy Fallon, recommended them to Lorne Michaels, the creator of Saturday Night Live.

The group was hired for SNL in 2005, with all three as writers and Samberg as a featured player. Bypassing the traditional process of pitching, they recorded their own material independently and submitted it to the program. Their second sketch to air, "Lazy Sunday", became an internet sensation, the first of many viral videos they produced while at SNL. They led their own division at the program — SNL Digital Shorts — which led to numerous viral videos, including "Jizz in My Pants", "Dick in a Box", "I'm on a Boat", "Like a Boss", "Motherlover", "I Just Had Sex", "Jack Sparrow", and "YOLO". Their musical comedic work has comprised four full studio albums: Incredibad (2009), Turtleneck & Chain (2011), The Wack Album (2013), and The Unauthorized Bash Brothers Experience (2019), along with a soundtrack album for their 2016 film Popstar: Never Stop Never Stopping. The three retired from SNL in the early 2010s, but occasionally make guest appearances.

The troupe has written, directed and starred in two feature-length films, Hot Rod, released in 2007, and Popstar, co-produced by Judd Apatow and released in 2016. The group also produced the 2020 film Palm Springs, starring Samberg and Cristin Milioti.

== History ==
=== Formation and early years (1990–2004) ===
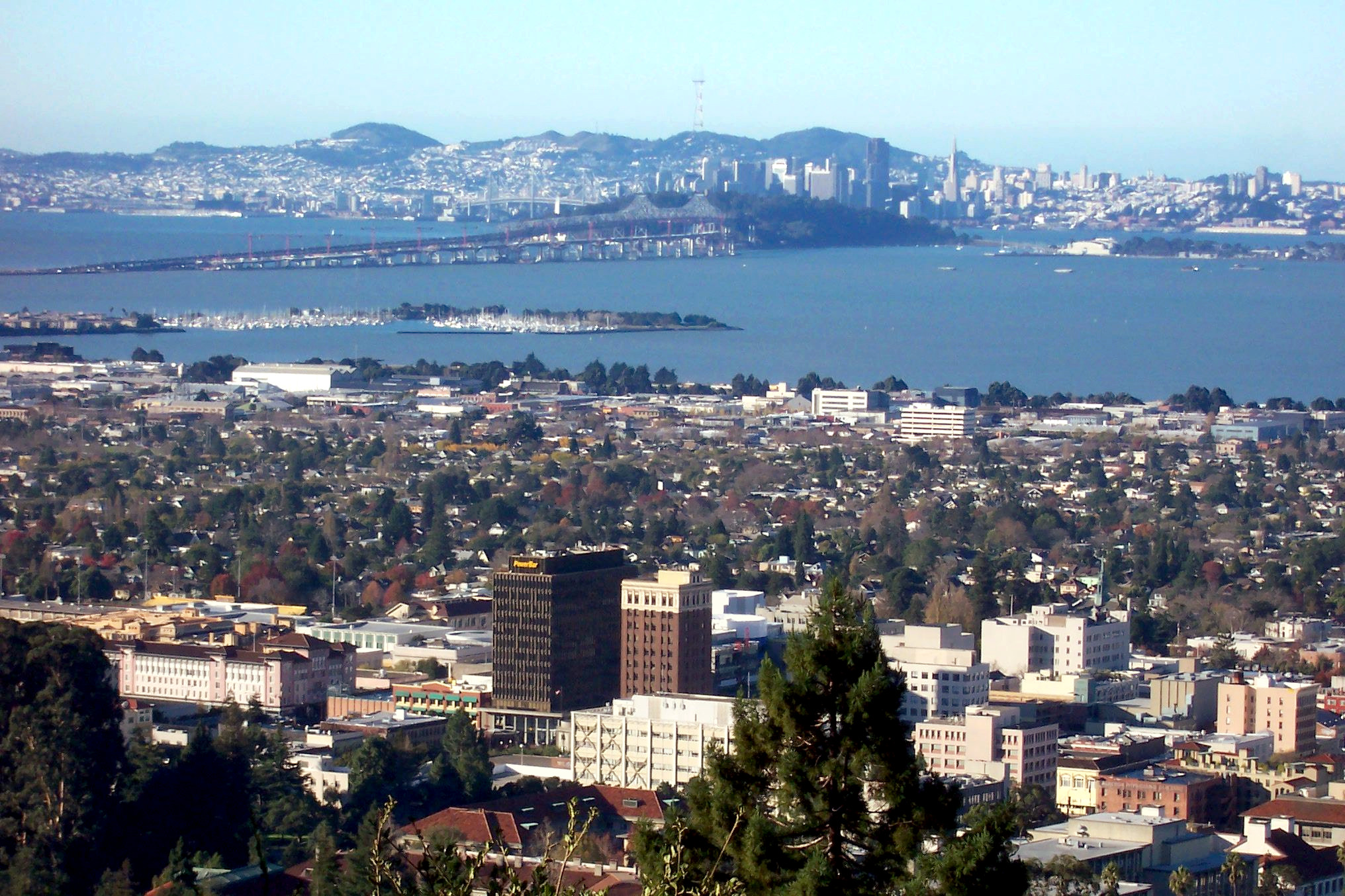
The three comedians first met in Berkeley, California.

The Lonely Island first formed at Willard Junior High School in Berkeley, California, in the early 1990s. Schaffer and Taccone first met in seventh grade Spanish class, and the group later expanded to include Samberg, a year behind the two. The trio belonged to a large group of friends interested in skateboarding. Each had plans to pursue the arts following their graduation from Berkeley High School, but they split apart, attending different colleges. Taccone attended the University of California, Los Angeles to study theatre, while Schaffer and Samberg both attended the University of California, Santa Cruz as film students. Samberg later transferred to New York University's Tisch School of the Arts in his sophomore year, with the three communicating over the phone during this period. Following college, the trio regrouped in Berkeley to decide their future. Their two options — either stay in Berkeley and begin making short films or move to Los Angeles, "get real jobs," and eventually begin making films —ended in a compromise.

In September 2000, they moved to Los Angeles and created their website, which would host short films. They named themselves The Lonely Island, after the "modest, low-rent" L.A. apartment that they shared with roommates Chester Tam and Matt Bettinelli-Olpin. The latter was a musician, and their late nights together often led to the trio making comedic rap songs, which they began to upload online. Their videos were produced via borrowed equipment and edited on a single PowerMac, and they were first uploaded to websites such as iFilm and Heavy.com. Their first "fake rap" song, "Ka-Blamo!", was uploaded in September 2001. They released their work under Creative Commons licenses, which allowed anyone to distribute their content (such as blogs and peer-to-peer networks), perhaps leading to wider audiences. In December 2001, they produced a pilot for a television series titled The Lonely Island; the first episode involved the three becoming addicted to teeth whitening products. The video gained the trio agents, and it was notable for a scene in which they mug an elderly woman. During the shoot, actor Kiefer Sutherland, not realizing it was a video, stopped and tried to intervene. Their agents requested they convert their shorts to VHS tape because they did not have high-speed internet at the time.

We would come home every night after having some drinks and challenge ourselves. Like: 'It's only midnight. By 2am, let's have this video done.' It would be the shittiest 8mm camcorder effort, and we would know it wasn't going anywhere, but we were consciously training ourselves. If one of us had got a killer assistant job to a director or something, we wouldn't have done that.

— Akiva Schaffer on the group's early years

Unable to secure full-time positions, the trio took temporary jobs; one season, they worked at Fox Television over the holidays, tying ribbons around metal snowflakes the studio gifted to their employees. Eventually, Schaffer worked as an assistant at a movie poster company, while Taccone and Samberg became production assistants on Spin City. In 2003, they produced a second pilot for a The Lonely Island series. The film premiered at the Comedy Central Stage in Los Angeles, the cable network's proving ground for new talent. The network purchased the series, but further scripts did not move forward. They became involved with Super Midnight Movie Club, a club hosted by screenwriters Dan Harmon and Rob Schrab, which evolved into Channel 101, a non-profit hosting monthly short film festivals. Their first submission, Ignition TV Buzz Countdown, was voted back after its premiere, but ended after two episodes. Their second Channel 101 series, The 'Bu, is a parody of Fox's The O.C. and was enormously successful at the screenings, running for eight episodes. It was pivotal in their early successes, demonstrating to television executives their popularity among tastemakers and a younger audience. Samberg's former producer at Spin City passed along the trio's demo reel to the United Talent Agency, which would lead them to their first major television deal.

=== Mainstream success at Saturday Night Live (2005–08) ===
==== Early sketches and "Lazy Sunday" ====
Following their success with The 'Bu, The Lonely Island secured a pitch meeting with Fox's then-president Gail Berman. There, the trio showed executives the video for "Just 2 Guyz", which received a positive reception. Following their deal with Fox, they produced a pilot titled Awesometown, over which the network passed. MTV and Comedy Central also passed on the series. Consequently, they began to question whether their material was humorous enough for a wide audience. They subsequently released two versions of the pilot on their website, the Fox-edited version and a "director's cut". Their increasing profile within Los Angeles comedy circles led to a writing job at the 2005 MTV Movie Awards, hosted by then-current Saturday Night Live cast-member Jimmy Fallon. Fallon's praise, in addition to word of mouth spreading to others at SNL, among them Tina Fey and creator Lorne Michaels, led the trio to audition for the series in mid-2005. For his audition, Samberg impersonated a 1980s jogger, commenting on the recession. SNL hired the trio in late August, with Taccone and Schaffer as writers and Samberg as a featured player. Samberg was the second new cast addition that season, alongside The Second City alumnus Bill Hader. Their debut episode premiered on October 1, 2005.

Schaffer and Taccone had been on the writing staff for nearly three months, yet to this point, they had only two live sketches that survived the dress rehearsal process and aired. By Thanksgiving, the duo felt antsy, and decided to produce a parody of "The Whisper Song" by the Ying Yang Twins as "The Bing Bong Brothers" (the song mainly consisting of a whispered refrain, "You will like our penises"). The video became a viral sensation and was picked up by G4's Attack of the Show. Encouraged by the response, the trio would incorporate that method into their next work for SNL. Their next sketch on SNL, "Lettuce Heads", consists of Samberg and Will Forte holding a serious discussion while intermittently eating whole heads of lettuce bite-by-bite. In creating the short, they decided to bypass the pitching process, as they were so new to the show that it would have been dismissed as too expensive. Their second video was turned down as it was deemed too similar.

In December, 2005, the trio, alongside Chris Parnell, wrote and recorded "Lazy Sunday", a short rap song. Samberg and Parnell adopt the brash personas of hardcore rappers, while the song follows their quest to achieve their "ultimate goal" of attending a matinee of the fantasy film The Chronicles of Narnia: The Lion, the Witch and the Wardrobe. It was recorded on a laptop in their offices at SNL, while it was shot throughout Manhattan the next day. In the moments preceding the show's live performance and broadcast, the team learned from Michaels that "Lazy Sunday" would be shown on that night's show. The three comedians were very worried about how the video would be received by the studio audience.

"Lazy Sunday" aired on December 17, 2005, when the comedy troupe were little known to even Saturday Night Live's most devout fans. By the following morning, it had spread online nationwide. Schaffer and Taccone also were contacted by friends who heard the track played on radio stations and in bars. "Lazy Sunday" inspired a line of T-shirts, released during the initial boom of popularity in the weeks after its release. The film was one of the first viral YouTube videos, and it increased the trio's recognizability, particularly Samberg's, nearly overnight. Their success, according to New York, "forced NBC into the iPod age"; the short was initially available after its broadcast through the iTunes Music Store, made free for subscribers. The original upload was removed by NBC for copyright violation in February 2006, and the short wasn't reuploaded to YouTube until August 2013.

Following his stardom on SNL, Samberg became a celebrity, being covered in tabloid publications. A profile of Island in The New York Times led to a record deal and their own division at SNL: SNL Digital Shorts, which the group controlled with complete autonomy. In March 2006, the trio produced their second viral hit, "Natalie's Rap". In the sketch, actress Natalie Portman acts as a gangsta rap star, juxtaposing her clean-cut, Harvard-educated image with profane and shocking lyrics. Portman was the host of the program that week and came to the three having seen "Lazy Sunday".

Their rise to fame was highlighted by a combination of "new" and "old" media, with Schaffer later remarking:

We had two things happening at once. First, we had a national TV show broadcasting our video, but we also had that moment in technology when anyone could stream it, so it could have that second life online. It wasn't just for early adopters or college kids with fast connections. Now it was for, like, my mom.

==== Further work: "Dick in a Box" and Hot Rod ====
Much of their work on Saturday Night Live further explored music. Their office—described by Taccone as "the nastiest dorm room you've ever been in"—doubled as a recording studio and editing bay. Multiple artists in the ensuing years would record their vocals for The Lonely Island songs on a $500 microphone in the office (which was not equipped with sound-proofing). The songs were recorded without professional audio engineers, and each video was edited by Taccone, Schaffer, and Samberg.

Creator Lorne Michaels was often confused by the trio's pitches. His attitude towards their work is referenced in the Digital Shorts series "Laser Cats", which consisted of Samberg and Hader brandishing cats as weapons that shoot lasers from their mouths. In each sketch, Michaels appears at the end, dismissing the visual quality and stupidity of concept. As such, he decided to stop taking their pitches and allow them independence from the program, producing their efforts themselves and turning them in.

In the summer of 2006, The Lonely Island filmed their first feature film, Hot Rod, in Vancouver. The film concerns Rod Kimble (Samberg), an Evel Knievel-type daredevil who dreams of jumping 15 school buses on a moped. The role was originally conceived for Will Ferrell before Samberg signed on. Subsequently, the trio re-wrote much of the original script to match their standards: "Which is another way of saying, just dumb it down," said Schaffer. The film was released in August 2007 to mediocre reviews and a tepid box office reaction. Despite this, the film later attracted a cult following; in 2012, The A.V. Club wrote that it differentiated itself from other Lorne Michaels–produced comedies: "They may be just as poorly received, but their rhythms are unpredictable and exciting, shocked to life by moments of anti-comedy and wacky deconstruction. Hardcore comedy devotees pick up on them like a dog whistle."

The Lonely Island's next major viral success came in December 2006, when they collaborated with singer Justin Timberlake for the Digital Short "Dick in a Box", starring Samberg and Timberlake as R&B-crooning balladeers who package their genitals as Christmas gifts. Taccone came up with the "dick in a box" premise after Michaels asked Samberg to write a sketch showcasing Timberlake's voice. Timberlake recalled that the musicians were "laughing hysterically" during its production, and that the "delirium of no sleep" contributed to the humor of the song. The online version of the short—which, like its predecessors, attracted millions of views on YouTube—was uncensored, creating controversy. "In the process Saturday Night Live appears to have become the first scripted comedy on a broadcast network to use the Web to make an end-run around the prying eyes of both its internal censors and those of the Federal Communications Commission, whose jurisdiction over “Saturday Night Live” effectively ends at the Web frontier," said Jaques Steinberg of The New York Times. The song won a Creative Arts Emmy for Outstanding Original Music and Lyrics.

Timberlake also made a guest appearance in the group's subsequent track "Jizz in My Pants".

Timberlake then returned to SNL in 2009 to make the digital short “Motherlover” with The Lonely Island, a sequel to "Dick in a Box", featuring the same characters.

=== Music, television, and film careers (2009–11) ===
==== Incredibad and continued viral success ====
In the summer of 2008, the trio rented a home in Los Angeles and began recording their debut studio album, Incredibad (2009), over the course of three months. The album is composed of new songs and pre-existing songs debuted and recorded for SNL. Many songs recorded for the album would later premiere as Digital Shorts in the following season of SNL. In contrast to their work at SNL, the troupe went through each song in detail, taking their time to craft the album. For the first time, the group incorporated professional mixing and mastering, leading to an improved sound quality of the recordings. The first song they created for the record "Jizz in My Pants", was the lead single and debuted as an SNL Digital Short in December 2008. It received millions of views, and was their first single to go platinum by the Recording Industry Association of America.

Incredibad was released a dual CD/DVD set in February 2009. Their next significant viral success was "I'm on a Boat", a collaboration with T-Pain that spoofs hip-hop excess. The trio had met T-Pain when he guested on SNL a year prior, who confirmed he was a fan of Hot Rod. "I'm on a Boat" was a bigger success than its predecessor, going double-platinum and earning a nomination for Best Rap/Sung Collaboration at the 52nd Grammy Awards. Although not an official single, based on digital downloads, "Like a Boss" was certified gold. The record sold nearly 250,000 units in 2009, making it the year's eighth bestselling hip hop album.

==== Turtleneck & Chain and videos ====
The group returned to Los Angeles, renting the same home and setting up a makeshift studio to record Turtleneck & Chain (2011), their follow-up to Incredibad. On January 29, 2011, the group debuted "The Creep" featuring Nicki Minaj and a cameo by filmmaker John Waters, on SNL and YouTube. On March 15, 2011, Direct Current Music reported that the album would be named Turtleneck & Chain and would be released on May 10, 2011. On April 1, 2011, the Lonely Island appeared as guests on Late Night with Jimmy Fallon, where they premiered the lead track, "We're Back!", as well as the new album cover. On April 19, 2011, the group released "Motherlover" featuring Justin Timberlake as the fourth single from the album. This song was last featured on season 34 of SNL.

The group held a fundraiser to promote their new album on April 16, 2011 at Amoeba Music in Berkeley, California. There were only 250 tickets available, and the only way to obtain a ticket was to preorder their album. They hosted a Q&A session and an autograph session. Shortly after, "Motherlover" was released on iTunes. On May 7, they released a new track, "Jack Sparrow", featuring Michael Bolton singing passionately about the Pirates of the Caribbean film series. Turtleneck & Chain was both Emmy nominated for Outstanding Original Music and Lyrics and Grammy nominated for Best Comedy Album.

Shortly after the release of the album, the group premiered a new song, "3-Way (The Golden Rule)", featuring Timberlake and Lady Gaga, on the season finale of SNL. Timberlake and Gaga were guests for the show, and the song re-approaches territory explored in "Dick in a Box" and "Motherlover". Much like their past work, it was recorded and shot in the week preceding the broadcast. At the end of the 2011–2012 season of SNL, Samberg's last season on the cast, a sequel to "Lazy Sunday" was released, also with Chris Parnell.

By this time, each member of the group increasingly began taking time off from SNL: Taccone for television work, Schaffer for directorial efforts (The Watch), and Samberg with leading film roles. Taccone and Samberg left at the end of the program's 2011–12 season, though Taccone would return for following seasons to produce Digital Shorts related to their musical work. The trio found it increasingly difficult to get together and work, as they all lived in different cities. In an interview with Splitsider the following year, they mentioned that different responsibilities and work in other fields strengthened their work as a unit: "I think if we just did this [the Lonely Island] all the time, then it maybe we would be in trouble, but going off and doing other things reminds us it's more fun to work with your friends," said Schaffer.

=== Post-SNL and continued collaborations (2012–present) ===
==== The Wack Album ====
Despite these obstacles, the trio regrouped in late 2012 to begin recording their third album for Republic Records, which they titled The Wack Album (a homage to minimalist titles such as the Beatles' self-titled 1968 album). Rather than rent the same home in Encino, they cut the album in nearby Los Feliz at a home equipped with a professional recording unit. Taccone and Samberg again lived together; Schaffer, now with a family, simply drove over each day to record and write. For the album's production, they solidified song premises long before receiving beats for each song, which came from both high-level and low-level producers. In some cases, the trio made the beats themselves.

The album's lead single, "YOLO" featuring Adam Levine and Kendrick Lamar, with a prominent sample from the song Whirring from the Welsh band The Joy Formidable, premiered on SNL in January 2013. The song is an anthem parodying the phrase "you only live once" and a culture lacking caution and responsibility. It was their first return to SNL since their respective departures; as such, the video was co-funded by the program. To promote the album, the trio released music videos for each song each Wednesday ("Wack Wednesdays") leading up to its release. Among the music videos produced include "Diaper Money" (a trap song regarding adulthood, aging, and impending death), "Semicolon" (which spoofs the popularity of hashtag rap), and "Go Kindergarten". "Spring Break Anthem" juxtaposes raucous and irresponsible spring break behavior with descriptions of same-sex marriage. "We wanted to show just how ridiculous it is that spring break behavior is considered normal and gay marriage is insane when it's actually the opposite," said Schaffer. The group wanted to mount a full-scale tour behind the album, but other opportunities (Samberg's comedy series Brooklyn Nine-Nine was just ordered as a series by Fox at the time) made it difficult.

==== "Everything is Awesome", Popstar: Never Stop Never Stopping, and Palm Springs ====
In early 2014, the group collaborated to write "Everything Is Awesome," a song featured in The Lego Movie, with Shawn Patterson, Joshua Bartholomew, and Lisa Harriton. The song, performed by Tegan and Sara, also features in The Lonely Island. It was nominated for the Academy Award for Best Original Song at the 87th Academy Awards.

In 2014, the troupe signed a deal with Fox to develop serial comedy programming for digital platforms and were listed on New Media Rockstars Top 100 YouTube Channels, ranked at number 70. Later that year, Universal Studios acquired a pitch from the trio for a second feature film, which was co-produced by Judd Apatow. Schaffer and Taccone co-directed the film, Popstar: Never Stop Never Stopping, which was released on June 3, 2016 along with a corresponding soundtrack album. The trio promoted the film by airing a Digital Short for the track "Finest Girl (Bin Laden Song)" during the Saturday Night Live season 41 finale.

The day after the 90th Academy Awards the group premiered a song on YouTube titled "Why Not Me" which they claimed was commissioned by the academy although not used because it was "financially and logistically impossible." The song features characters from various movies who did not get nominated sing about being snubbed by the Academy. It was not immediately clear if the group was actually asked by the Academy to perform or if this was part of the joke.

In 2018, Lonely Island held their first live performance at Clusterfest, a comedy festival in San Francisco hosted by Comedy Central. Several of their featured guests appeared at the festival, including Chris Parnell and Michael Bolton.

In 2020, the group produced the romantic comedy film Palm Springs starring Samberg and Cristin Milioti. The film was released at Sundance Film Festival in January 2020 and released widely via Hulu on July 10, 2020. The film received positive reviews from critics, with praise for the performances and concept.

==== Netflix specials and television production work ====
In 2017, the group released Michael Bolton's Big, Sexy Valentine's Day Special, a Netflix special starring Michael Bolton and featuring numerous cameos from celebrities and SNL cast members. On May 23, 2019, the group released a Netflix special, advertised as a "visual poem" to go with a new album, The Unauthorized Bash Brothers Experience, itself framed as a rap album written and performed by baseball players Jose Canseco and Mark McGwire in the 1980s, while the pair were known as the Bash Brothers while playing for the Oakland Athletics.

As part of the team's television production contract, several programs produced by The Lonely Island began airing. Party Over Here, a sketch comedy series, aired on Fox in 2016 but was cancelled after one season. The next year, I'm Sorry, a sitcom starring Andrea Savage and produced by the Lonely Island along with Adam McKay and Will Ferrell, began airing on TruTV In 2018, the group created and produced Alone Together, which had 2 seasons on Freeform. The next year saw the release of PEN15, a comedy web television series focusing on middle school, and airing on Hulu.

==== Return to digital projects ====
In April 2024, the group returned to their YouTube channel to release a weekly podcast co-hosted with Seth Meyers, head writer during their time at Saturday Night Live, called The Lonely Island and Seth Meyers Podcast. The podcast follows the members revisiting their Digital Shorts, reminiscing on their time working at SNL together. The group refers to the fans of this podcast as the “Quaid Army.” This is in reference to the 1990 science fiction film Total Recall and a digital short the group made referencing this movie in their time at SNL.

In October 2024, The Lonely Island revived their Digital Short series for SNL's 50th season, with a new music video entitled "Sushi Glory Hole", featuring Samberg and Schaffer. This marked the group's first music project since 2019. The group would release another Digital Short music video titled "Here I Go", featuring the host of the episode, Charli XCX. In February 2025, the group performed a medley of their greatest hits at the SNL50: The Homecoming Concert, featuring Lady Gaga, Chris Parnell, Bad Bunny, T-Pain, and Eddie Vedder. As a part of the Saturday Night Live 50th Anniversary Special, the group released the Digital Short "Anxiety".

== Style ==
The comedic influences of the group include SNL forebears such as Adam Sandler, Chris Farley, Mike Myers, Steve Martin, Mel Brooks, the Monty Python troupe and the Marx Brothers. The group's musical styles are most strongly inspired by hip-hop and R&B; the lyrics are commonly rooted in the assumptions of the hip hop community being contorted while applying the same level of rhyme and syllabic coordination. The style includes heavy self-deprecation, which is reflected in a 2011 interview conducted shortly before the release of Turtleneck and Chain. The Lonely Island's debut Incredibad was produced with the goal in mind to make an impact on listeners just as They're All Gonna Laugh At You (1993), a musical comedy album by Adam Sandler, had heavily influenced Samberg. Songs by the Lonely Island rarely exceed three minutes, as brevity is very important to the troupe, who believe that is "about as much as the audience can stand."

The group parody a variety of aspects of hip hop/rap music, by inverting the machismo of much rap music by rapping with enthusiasm about their erectile dysfunction problems ("We're Back!"), rapping in a bombastic tone about mundane subjects ("Lazy Sunday"), or diss tracks by recording a song featuring death threats in deliberately weedy voices ("We'll Kill You"). Much rap music tends to feature inventive boasting about the speaker's wealth, power or sex appeal, and the group have regularly inverted this by creating deliberately repetitive tracks that make similar statements in an extremely literal way ("I Just Had Sex", "I'm on a Boat"). "I'm on a Boat", created to parody the style of many rap music videos, avoids making any comment about the group's wealth besides the fact that they are, indeed, standing on a boat in the music video. Many of their songs, both during and after their tenure on SNL, are produced with accompanying videos.

The group's popularity and television budget has allowed them to access high end production and special guests that would be out of reach to most comedy music acts. Their collaborators have included Nicki Minaj ("The Creep"), Rihanna ("Shy Ronnie"), , DJ Frank E and Akon ("I Just Had Sex") and Justin Timberlake ("Dick in a Box", "Mother Lover" and "3-Way (The Golden Rule)").

== Discography ==
- Incredibad (2009)
- Turtleneck & Chain (2011)
- The Wack Album (2013)
- Popstar: Never Stop Never Stopping (2016)
- The Unauthorized Bash Brothers Experience (2019)

== Filmography ==
=== Films ===
| Year | Film | | | | |
| Year | Film | Director | Producer | Writer | Actor |
|---|---|---|---|---|---|
| 2007 | Hot Rod | Yes | No | Uncredited | Yes |
| 2010 | MacGruber | Yes | Yes | Yes | No |
| 2012 | The Watch | Yes | No | No | Yes |
| 2013 | Grown Ups 2 | No | No | No | Yes |
| 2014 | Neighbors | No | No | No | Yes |
| 2016 | Popstar: Never Stop Never Stopping | Yes | Yes | Yes | Yes |
| 2017 | Michael Bolton's Big, Sexy Valentine's Day Special | Yes | Yes | Yes | Yes |
| 2017 | Brigsby Bear | No | Yes | No | Yes |
| 2019 | The Unauthorized Bash Brothers Experience | Yes | Yes | Yes | Yes |
| 2020 | Palm Springs | No | Yes | No | Yes |
| 2020 | I Used to Go Here | No | Yes | No | Yes |
| 2022 | Chip 'n Dale: Rescue Rangers | Yes | No | No | Yes |
| 2023 | Self Reliance | No | Yes | No | Yes |

=== Television ===
| Year | Film | | | | |
| Year | Film | Director | Producer | Writer | Actor |
|---|---|---|---|---|---|
| 2005 | Awesometown | Yes | Yes | Yes | Yes |
| 2005 | 2005 MTV Movie Awards | No | No | Yes | No |
| 2005–2012, 2024 | Saturday Night Live | Yes | No | Yes | Yes |
| 2009 | Tim and Eric Awesome Show, Great Job! | No | No | No | Yes |
| 2013–2021 | Brooklyn Nine-Nine | Yes | Yes | No | Yes |
| 2014, 2016 | Comedy Bang! Bang! | No | No | No | Yes |
| 2016 | Party Over Here | No | Yes | Yes | No |
| 2017 | I'm Sorry | No | Yes | No | No |
| 2018 | Alone Together | No | Yes | No | No |
| 2019 | PEN15 | No | Yes | No | No |
| 2019 | I Think You Should Leave with Tim Robinson | Yes | Yes | No | Yes |
| 2023–present | Digman! | No | Yes | Yes | Yes |

== Awards and nominations ==
Awards and nominations
| Year | Awards | Category | Recipient | Artist(s) | Result | Ref(s) |
|---|---|---|---|---|---|---|
| 2007 | Creative Arts Emmy Award | Outstanding Original Music and Lyrics | "Dick in a Box" | The Lonely Island; Justin Timberlake | Won | |
| 2009 | Creative Arts Emmy Award | Outstanding Original Music and Lyrics | "Motherlover" | The Lonely Island; Justin Timberlake | Nominated | |
| 2010 | Grammy Award | Best Rap/Sung Collaboration | "I'm On A Boat" | The Lonely Island; Faheem Najm | Nominated | |
| 2010 | Creative Arts Emmy Award | Outstanding Original Music and Lyrics | "Shy Ronnie" | The Lonely Island | Nominated | |
| 2011 | Creative Arts Emmy Award | Outstanding Original Music and Lyrics | "I Just Had Sex" | The Lonely Island | Nominated | |
| 2011 | Creative Arts Emmy Award | Outstanding Original Music and Lyrics | "Jack Sparrow" | The Lonely Island | Nominated | |
| 2011 | Creative Arts Emmy Award | Outstanding Original Music and Lyrics | "3-Way (The Golden Rule)" | The Lonely Island; Justin Timberlake; Stefani Germanotta | Nominated | |
| 2012 | Grammy Award | Best Comedy Album | Turtleneck & Chain | The Lonely Island | Nominated | |

== See also ==
- SNL Digital Short
- List of Saturday Night Live musical sketches
- List of recurring Saturday Night Live characters and sketches
