= The Joy Formidable discography =

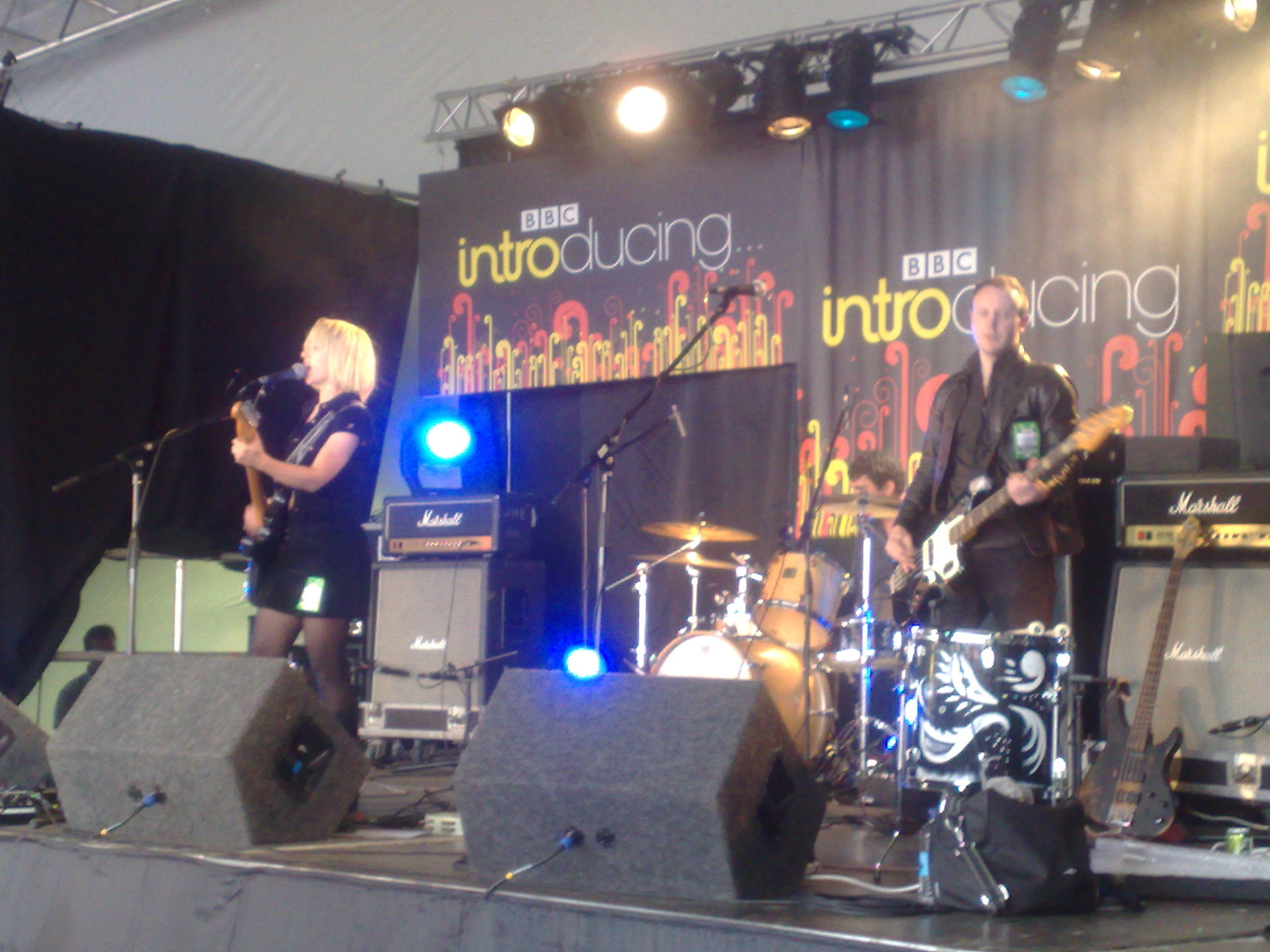
- The Joy Formidable on the BBC Introducing stage at the Reading Festival in 2008.
- Studio albums: 5
- EPs: 4
- Live albums: 1
- Singles: 19

The discography of Welsh alternative rock band the Joy Formidable consists of five studio albums, one live album, three extended plays and 15 singles. Their debut extended play, A Balloon Called Moaning, was released in December 2008, followed by their debut studio album, The Big Roar, in January 2011, which reached No. 31 on the UK Albums Chart, and produced the singles "Whirring" and "A Heavy Abacus", which reached No. 7 and No. 25 on the US Alternative Songs Chart, respectively. Their second studio album, Wolf's Law, was released in January 2013 and reached No. 41 and No. 51 on the UK Albums Chart and the US Billboard 200, respectively. Their third studio album, Hitch was released in March 2016. Their fourth studio album, AAARTH, was released on 28 September 2018. Their fifth studio album, Into the Blue, was released on 20 August 2021.

== Albums ==
=== Studio albums ===
List of albums, with selected details and chart positions
| Title | Details | Peak chart positions | | | | | | Sales |
| Title | Details | UK | UK Indie | SCO | US | US Alt. | US Ind. | Sales |
|---|---|---|---|---|---|---|---|---|
| The Big Roar | Released: 24 January 2011; Label: Atlantic; Formats: CD, LP, digital download | 31 | — | 36 | — (Note: The Big Roar did not enter the US Billboard 200, but peaked at number 8 on the US Heatseekers Albums Chart.) | — | — | |
| Wolf's Law | Released: 21 January 2013; Label: Atlantic; Formats: CD, LP, digital download | 41 | — | 58 | 51 | 11 | — | US: 25,000 |
| Hitch | Released: 25 March 2016; Label: Caroline; Formats: CD, LP, digital download | 119 | 12 | — | — (Note: Hitch did not enter the US Billboard 200, but peaked at number 82 on the US Billboard Album Sales Chart.) | 15 | 14 | |
| AAARTH | Released: 28 September 2018; Label: Caroline; Formats: CD, LP, digital download | 93 | 13 | 70 | — | — | 42 | |
| Into the Blue | Released: 20 August 2021; Label: Hassle | — (Note: Into the Blue did not enter the UK Albums Chart, but peaked at number 80 on the UK Album Sales Chart.) | 30 | 68 | — | — | — | |
"—" denotes album that did not chart or was not released

=== Live albums ===
List of albums, with selected details
| Title | Details |
|---|---|
| First You Have to Get Mad | Released: 2009; Label: Independent; Formats: CD |

== Extended plays ==
List of EPs, with selected details
| Title | Album details |
|---|---|
| A Balloon Called Moaning | Released: 17 December 2008; Label: Black Bell; Formats: CD, LP, digital download |
| Bootleg, Vol. 1 | Released: 2011; Label: Independent; Formats: CD |
| Roarities | Released: 5 July 2011; Label: Atlantic; Formats: CD, digital download |
| The Big More | Released: 14 October 2011; Label: Atlantic; Formats: CD, digital download |
| Sleep is Day | Released: 26 September 2016; Label: C'mon Let's Drift; Formats: Digital download |

== Singles ==
List of singles, with selected chart positions and certifications
| Title | Year | Peak chart positions | | | | | | Album |
| Title | Year | UK Sales | BEL (FL) Tip | CAN Rock | MEX Air. | US Alt | US Rock | Album |
|---|---|---|---|---|---|---|---|---|
| "Austere"^{[A]} | 2008 | 14 | — | — | 31 | — | — | A Balloon Called Moaning and The Big Roar |
| "Cradle"^{[A]} | 2009 | 32 | — | — | 30 | — | — | A Balloon Called Moaning and The Big Roar |
| "Whirring"^{[A]} | 2009 | 41 | 34 | 22 | 38 | 7 | 21 | A Balloon Called Moaning and The Big Roar |
| "Popinjay"^{[B]} | 2010 | 34 | — | — | — | — | — | The Big Roar |
| "I Don't Want to See You Like This" | 2010 | 12 | — | — | — | — | — | The Big Roar |
| "A Heavy Abacus" | 2011 | — | — | — | 50 | 25 | — | The Big Roar |
| "This Ladder Is Ours" | 2012 | — | — | — | 35 | 24 | — | Wolf's Law |
| "Cholla" | 2012 | 8 | — | — | — | — | — | Wolf's Law |
| "A Minute's Silence" | 2013 | 40 | — | — | — | — | — | non-album single |
| "Silent Treatment" | 2013 | — | — | — | — | — | — | Wolf's Law |
| "Yn Rhydiau'r Afon"^{[C]} | 2014 | — | — | — | — | — | — | non-album singles |
| "Tynnu Sylw"^{[C]} | 2014 | — | — | — | — | — | — | non-album singles |
| "Y Garreg Ateb"^{[C]} | 2015 | — | — | — | — | — | — | non-album singles |
| "Twin Peaks" | 2015 | — | — | — | — | — | — | non-album singles |
| "The Last Thing on My Mind" | 2016 | — | — | — | — | 40 | — | Hitch |
| "Y Gwir a'r Gwendid"^{[C]} | 2017 | — | — | — | — | — | — | non-album singles |
| "Cynnu Tân"^{[C]} | 2017 | — | — | — | — | — | — | non-album singles |
| "Dance of the Lotus" | 2018 | — | — | — | — | — | — | AAARTH |
| "The Wrong Side" | 2018 | — | — | — | — | — | — | AAARTH |
| "The Better Me" | 2018 | — | — | — | — | — | — | AAARTH |
| "Into the Blue" | 2021 | — | — | — | — | — | — | Into the Blue |
| "Back to Nothing" | 2021 | — | — | — | — | — | — | Into the Blue |
| "Chimes" | 2021 | — | — | — | — | — | — | Into the Blue |
| "Interval" | 2021 | — | — | — | — | — | — | Into the Blue |
"—" denotes items which were not released in that country or failed to chart.

=== Promotional singles ===
List of promotional singles
| Title | Year | MEX Air. | Album |
|---|---|---|---|
| "Little Blimp" | 2012 | 47 | Wolf's Law |

Notes:

- ^{A} - These tracks were re-released in 2011 in promotion of The Big Roar.
- ^{B} - This track was included only on the Japanese and limited editions of The Big Roar
- ^{C} - These tracks were released as part of the Aruthrol singles collection, in which The Joy Formidable released a single, usually in Welsh, along with another Welsh band.
