= Ayad Al Adhamy =

Bahraini-American musician (born 1985)

- Born: 21 September 1985 (age 41); Manama, Bahrain
- Genres: Power pop, punk rock, synthpop
- Occupations: Multi-instrumentalist, A&R, remixer, record producer
- Instruments: Synthesizer, sampler, softsynth, vocals, bass guitar, percussion, guitar, keyboards
- Labels: Black Bell Records, Vice Records, Warner Bros. Records
- Formerly of: Passion Pit
- Website: Black Bell Records; Passion Pit

Ayad Al Adhamy (Arabic: إياد الأعظمي) is an American multi-instrumentalist, producer and record label owner based in Brooklyn, New York. He is the former synthesizer, sample, and percussion player of Passion Pit, and shared remix duties with Nate Donmoyer and Ian Hultquist.

He currently fronts the Brooklyn garage rock outfit Team Spirit, signed to Vice Records/Warner Bros. Records. They released their Self Titled Debut EP on April 4, 2013, and it was received positively. (Rolling Stone) Coupled with the EP, is an ongoing extreme-animated series of music videos, created by Swedish animation duo HannesJohannes about "...the idea of Damnation and Salvation."

In 2010, Ayad Al Adhamy, started Black Bell Records, an independent record label that released the debut EP of The Joy Formidable and singles by Dom, Girlfriends, Pretty & Nice and Reptar. Full Length releases include Secret Music, Stepdad and Guards.

Ayad Al Adhamy is an alumnus of the Berklee College of Music (2009). He is an official endorsed artist of Moog, Dave Smith and Korg instruments.

== Team Spirit releases ==
Title	Release date	Format
Killing Time	September 30, 2014	Digital Download, CD & 10" Vinyl Record
Love is for Suckers	Feb 14th 2012	Digital Download
Team Spirit	April 9, 2012	Digital Download, CD & 10" Vinyl Record

== Black Bell Records releases ==
Artist	Title	Format
The Joy Formidable	A Balloon Called Moaning	Digital Download, CD & 12" Vinyl Record
Dom	Bowl Cut ft. Madeline of Cults	Digital Single & 7" Single
Girlfriends	EATBP & Cave Kids	7" Single
Pretty & Nice	Fantastic Artifact	7" Single
Various Artists	Black Bell Records Vol 1.	12" Vinyl Record
Secret Music	Secret Music	Digital Download, CD & 12" Vinyl Record
Stepdad	Wildlife Pop	Digital Download, CD & 12" Vinyl Record
Guards	In Guards We Trust	Digital Download, CD & 12" Vinyl Record
Total Slacker	Slip Away	TBA

== Producer/engineer/mixer ==
Artist	Title	Label	Role
Yes Giantess	Tuff n Stuff/ You Were Young	Neon Gold Records	Producer / Engineer / Mixer
Aislyn	Aislyn EP	Self-Released	Mixer
Secret Music	Secret Music	Black Bell Records	Producer / Mixer
Dom	Bowl Cut ft. Madeline of Cults	Black Bell Records	Producer / Mixer / Bass
Miniature Tigers	Boomerang	Modern Art Records	Producer / Mixer
Tokyo Police Club	Champ (Acoustic) - Deluxe Edition	Mom + Pop	Mixer
We Barbarians	Strange Overtones	Beranimal	Producer / Mixer
Emil & Friends	Lo and Behold	Cantora Records	Additional Production
Fort Lean	Sunsick/Precinct Single	Black Bell Records/ Neon Gold Records	Producer
Rubbing Alcohol	EP	TBD	Producer / Mixer
Slam Donahue	EP	Cantora Records	Producer / Mixer
Double Standard	EP	Many Hats Distribution	Producer
Alexandros	Sleepless in Brooklyn	Universal J / RX-Records	Producer / Engineer / Mixer

== Remixes as Passion Pit ==
Original artist/band	Song
Marina and the Diamonds	"I Am Not a Robot"
Phoenix	"1901"
Chairlift	"Bruises"
OK Go	"This Too Shall Pass"
Paper Route	"Tiger Teeth"
Tegan and Sara	"Alligator"
The Ting Tings	"Hands"
Max Tundra	"Which Song"
ARMS	"Heat and Hot Water"
Two Door Cinema Club	"Undercover Martyn"
Beastie Boys	"Make Some Noise"
Cold War Kids	"Mine Is Yours"

== Remixes as Bo Flex ==
Original artist/band	Song
Passion Pit	"Sleepyhead"
Sheraff	"Born in Summer"
Mr Little Jeans	"Angel"
U.S. Royalty	"Keep It Cool"
Animal Kingdom	"Signs and Wonders"

== Remixes as Team Spirit ==
Original artist/band	Song
Blondfire	"Where the Kids Are"
