= Rountree =

Rountree may refer to:

- Rountree (surname)
- Rountree Township, Montgomery County, Illinois, U.S.
- 22082 Rountree, minor planet
- Rountree, Springfield, a neighborhood in Springfield, Missouri, U.S.

== See also ==
- Roundtree
- Rowntree (disambiguation)
