= Rountree (surname) =

Rountree is an English surname. The Dictionary of American Family Names suggests that it is a topographic name for someone who lived by a rowan tree. Its variants are Rowntree and Roundtree. Notable people with the surname include:

- Camilla Rountree, Australian actress and costume designer
- Christopher Rountree (born 1983), American conductor
- Frances Mitchell Rountree (1880–1956), American politician and newspaper editor
- Harry Rountree (1878–1950), British illustrator
- Helen C. Rountree (born 1944), American ethnohistorian of Native Americans
- J. L. Hunter "Red" Rountree (1911–2004), American folk hero
- Jim Rountree (1936–2013), American football player
- John H. Rountree (1805–1890), American judge, farmer, politician from Wisconsin
- Khalil Rountree (born 1990), American mixed martial artist
- Larry Rountree III (born 1998), American football player
- Lee J. Rountree (1868–1923), American politician and newspaperman
- Leonidas Johnson Rountree (1868–1923), American politician from Texas
- Lin Rountree (born 1971), American composer and record producer
- Martha Rountree (1911–1999), American journalist
- Mary Rountree (1922–2007), American baseball player
- Phyllis Rountree (1911–1994), Australian microbiologist and bacteriologist
- Ricky Rountree (born 1952), Irish clergyman and former Archdeacon of Glendalough (2009–2018)
- Tucker Rountree (born 1981), American songwriter
- Victor Rountree (born 1959), American politician from Nebraska
- Walter B. Rountree (1903–1980), American football player
- William J. Rountree (1882–?), American Shipping company owner
- William M. Rountree (1917–1995), American diplomat
