= Roarities =

EP by The Joy Formidable
- Released: 5 July 2011
- Genre: Alternative rock, indie rock, shoegazing, electronic
- Label: Atlantic

The Joy Formidable chronology
The Big Roar (2011)	Roarities (2011)	The Big More (2011)

Roarities is an extended play by Welsh alternative rock band the Joy Formidable. It was released on 5 July 2011 as a digital download and CD, the latter distributed exclusively through the band's website. The EP's title is a play on the title of their debut album, The Big Roar, and is composed of remixes and live performances.

== Track listing ==
No.	Title	Length
1.	"Austere (The Naked and Famous Remix)"	5:45
2.	"Whirring (Innerpartysystem Remix)"	5:46
3.	"A Heavy Abacus (Live at Koko)"	3:52
4.	"Llaw = Wall (Live at Koko)"	4:30
5.	"The Greatest Light Is the Greatest Shade (Live at Koko)"	6:29
