= Don't Let Me Know =

Don't Let Me Know may refer to:

- "Don't Let Me Know", song by the Joy Formidable from Hitch
- "Don't Let Me Know", song by Lucie Silvas
- "Don't Let Me Know", song by Cyrus
