= The Big More =

EP by The Joy Formidable
- Released: 14 October 2011
- Genre: Alternative rock, indie rock, shoegazing, dream pop
- Label: Atlantic

The Joy Formidable chronology
Roarities (2011)	The Big More (2011)	Wolf's Law (2013)

The Big More is an extended play by Welsh alternative rock band the Joy Formidable. It was released on 14 October 2011 as a digital download and CD; the latter was distributed exclusively through the band's website. The EP is composed of remixes, live performances and an original song, "Anemone".

== Track listing ==
No.	Title	Length
1.	"Cradle"	2:46
2.	"Cradle (Fang Island Remix)"	3:19
3.	"Anemone"	4:10
4.	"Whirring (Live at Koko)"	10:03
5.	"It's Over"	3:08

== Chart performance ==
Chart (2011)	Peak position
UK Physical Singles Chart (Official Charts Company)	32
