= Frances Mitchell Rountree =

American politician and newspaper editor (1880–1956)

Member of the Texas House of Representatives from the 26th district
- In office January 13, 1931 – January 10, 1933
- Preceded by: Wingate S. Barron
- Succeeded by: George Byron Butler

Personal details
- Born: Frances Mitchell; March 19, 1880 Llano, Texas, US
- Died: December 5, 1956 (aged 76) Bryan, Texas, US
- Party: Democratic
- Spouse: Leonidas Johnson Rountree (m. 1902–1923)
- Occupation: Politician, newspaper editor

Frances "Frannie" Mitchell Rountree (erroneously Francis; born Frances Mitchell; March 19, 1880 – December 5, 1956) was an American politician and newspaper editor. A Democrat, she was a member of the Texas House of Representatives. She was the wife of politician Leonidas Johnson Rountree.

== Early life and early career ==
Rountree was born on March 19, 1880, in Llano, Texas, the daughter of Thomas C. Mitchell and Lulu M. (née Clark) Mitchell. Some sources place her birthyear at some point in the 1870s, with The Bryan-College Station Eagle saying her exact birthdate was "shrouded in genteel mystery". She never revealed her birthdate, with her official birth certificate including a question mark next to the date of birth it gave.

Rountree grew up in Williamson County, Texas, primarily in Round Rock, with her attending the Round Rock Institute. She then studied at the Southwestern University. She may have graduated in 1900, though it is unknown whether or not she graduated.

On April 2, 1902, Rountree married politician Leonidas Johnson Rountree; they had no children together. After her marriage, she went by Mrs. Lee J. Rountree, with many not knowing her birth name.

Rountree later moved to Bryan and was a homemaker. In 1920, her husband purchased The Bryan Daily News, which she managed. Following her husband's death in 1923, she became its editor. She was one of the first women to manage a Texas newspaper. During Prohibition, she was treatened by a bootlegger not to publish an article covering him, which she ignored, for she was not dead when the time to publish it came. She was also a columnist, writing "Pavement Pick-Ups", which was about things she experienced while traveling the streets of Bryan.

== Political career ==
Rountree was a Democrat. She was a delegate to the of 1928, 1936, and 1944 Democratic National Conventions, being an alternate delegate in 1944. It is purported that she completed her husband's unexpired term following his death, which is false. She was a member of the Texas House of Representatives, from January 13, 1931, to January 10, 1933, representing the 26th district. She lost the following election.

While serving, Rountree was a member of the Committees on Appropriations; on Education; on Privileges, Suffrage and Elections; and on School Districts. She continued the legislation work of her husband regarding the Brazos River Authority, later serving on its board. She sponsored five bills, with two becoming law. One law allowed the Governor of Texas to change highways' rights of way, and the other created a firefighter's program for Texas A&M University. She opposed repealing Texas's blue laws.

Rountree was the first woman to represent Brazos County. She served in the 42nd Texas Legislature, during which four other women were legislators: Sarah T. Hughes, Helen Edmunds Moore, Margie Neal, and Cora Gray Strong; this was the highest representation of women in the Legislature in Texas history. She and Strong were the first two widows elected to the Legislature.

== Later career and death ==
After serving in the Legislature, Rountree resumed her work as editor and publisher of The Bryan Daily News, continuing to do so until her death. She was president of the Texas Press Association, the first woman to hold the position. She was also vice-president of the Texas Editorial Association. She was a member of the Texas Federation of Women's Clubs' board of executives. In 1925, she was the first woman to head the Bryan chamber of commerce. She typically worre black and gray dresses.

Rountree was a Methodist. In 1950, she suffered an severe illness, requiring her to move into the LaSalle Hotel. She died on December 5, 1956, aged 76, in Bryan. She died from a stroke she had sufferred while writing at her desk on November 26, being in a coma for the remainder of her life. According to her death certificate, she had died from sapremia, caused by unhealed burns caused by an x-ray c. 1942. She was buried at Bryan City Cemetery.
