= Family of Love =

Family of Love may refer to:

- Familia Caritatis, a Dutch Christian denomination founded in the 16th century by Henry Nicholis
- The Family International, formerly named The Family of Love, an American Christian new religious movement founded in 1968 by David Berg
- The Family of Love (play), a 1608 play by an anonymous author
- Family of Love (EP), a 2011 EP by Dom
