= Wildlife Pop =

Studio album by Stepdad
- Released: June 12, 2012
- Genre: Synthpop, electronic
- Length: 54:20
- Label: Black Bell Records
- Producer: Chris Zane

Stepdad chronology
| Ordinaire EP (2010) | Wildlife Pop (2012) | Strange Tonight EP (2014) |

Professional ratings
Review scores
| Source | Rating |
|---|---|
| AbsolutePunk | 88% |
| AllMusic | 3.5/5 stars |
| Chicago Tribune | 3/4 stars |
| Consequence of Sound | C+ |

Wildlife Pop is the debut studio album of electronic/pop group Stepdad, released in 2012.

== Critical reception ==
The Chicago Tribune wrote that "the pleasures crop up enough that this electro-pop tingles with the soothing energy of running a 5K and flopping onto a bed of cotton candy." The Detroit Metro Times wrote that the band "makes some of the weirdest, most fun and interesting 8-bit electro pop around."

== Track listing ==
| No. | Title | Length |
|---|---|---|
| 1. | "Must Land Running" | 3:30 |
| 2. | "Jungles" | 4:40 |
| 3. | "Show Me Your Blood" | 4:20 |
| 4. | "Mystery in the Faking" | 4:13 |
| 5. | "Will I Ever Dance Again" | 3:35 |
| 6. | "To Ribbons" | 3:47 |
| 7. | "My Leather, My Fur, My Nails" | 4:24 |
| 8. | "Pick & Choose" | 5:20 |
| 9. | "Starfriends On Earth" | 4:13 |
| 10. | "Treasure Hugs" | 6:20 |
| 11. | "Exploring" | 4:48 |
| 12. | "Warrior (Jungles Part 2)" | 5:08 |
| Total length: | | 54:12 |
