= The Happy Fits =

American indie rock band

- The Happy Fits at the 9:30 Club in Washington DC (2025)

Background information
- Origin: Pittstown, New Jersey, U.S.
- Genre: Indie rock
- Years active: 2016–present
- Members: Calvin Langman; Luke Davis; Nico Rose; Raina Mullen
- Past members: Ross Monteith
- Website: https://www.thehappyfits.com/

The Happy Fits are an indie rock band from Pittstown, New Jersey. The band was formed in 2016 by lead vocalist and cellist Calvin Langman and guitarist Ross Monteith, with the addition of Luke Davis as drummer following the release of their debut EP Awfully Apeelin'. After finding unexpected success on Spotify, the band members dropped out of college to record their first full-length album, Concentrate. They have since completed multiple headlining tours and released a sophomore album, What Could Be Better, in 2020, and a third album, Under the Shade of Green, in 2022. Their fourth album, Lovesick, was released in 2025.

== History ==
=== 2016–2017: Band formation ===
The band members attended the same New Jersey high school, North Hunterdon Regional High School in Clinton, NJ. There, Ross Monteith approached the classically trained Calvin Langman to play music together. By the close of their senior year, they had written four songs. As a graduation present, Monteith's parents paid for them to record the songs that would make their first EP. Two days before recording, they contacted Ross's older brother's friend, Luke Davis, to add a layer of percussion. Davis was attending William Paterson University, but he had graduated from their high school the year prior, described by his bandmates as the school's best drummer. Their band name was decided on the way to the studio.

Their first EP, Awfully Apeelin', was released in August 2016. While Langman and Monteith were attending the University of Delaware, "While You Fade Away" was listed on Spotify's Fresh Finds playlist, jumping from under 1,000 listens on the app to over 39,000. It reached #5 on the Top 50 Viral USA Spotify chart three days later and #17 on the Spotify’s Top 50 Viral Global Charts. Following the success of their EP, Davis joined as an official member, and in 2017, all three members dropped out of college to pursue the band full-time.

=== 2018–present: Concentrate and Under the Shade of Green ===
In 2018, the band released their debut album, Concentrate.

In February 2020, the band finished recording their second album and set out on a tour that was quickly cancelled due to the COVID-19 pandemic. Subsequently, the band focused on their social media presence, with weekly livestreams on YouTube. In August 2020, they released their second album, What Could Be Better. The album was named one of the ten best albums of the year by Fresh Air's Ken Tucker.

On January 24, 2024, the band announced on their Instagram that founding member Ross Monteith would be leaving the band; later that day, they announced Nico Rose and Raina Mullen as new full members of the band, having previously toured alongside Langman and Davis.

On October 22, 2026, the band live streamed their first episode of "The Happy Fits Take Cover" where they will be doing covers of songs. Episode 1 was focused on breaking down Expectations (Olivia Rodrigo song) into parts, listening for notes/chords, and learning to play it as a group.

== Discography ==
=== Studio albums ===
Title	Details
Concentrate	Released: June 15, 2018; Engineer and Producer: Ayad Al Adhamy & Joel Witenberg; Formats: CD, Vinyl, Digital Download, LP
What Could Be Better	Released: August 28, 2020; Engineer and Producer: Ayad Al Adhamy & Joel Witenberg; Mixed By Jim Stewart; Mastered By Dan Millice; Label: Diamond City Records; Formats: CD, Vinyl, Digital Download, LP
Under the Shade of Green	Released: August 26, 2022; Engineer and Producer: Ayad Al Adhamy; Mixed By Jim Stewart; Mastered By Dan Millice; Label: AWAL Recordings America, INC; Formats: CD, Vinyl, Digital Download, LP
Lovesick	Released: September 19, 2025; Producers: Ayad Al Adhamy & Calvin Langman; Engineered by: Carl Bespolka, Chris Bittner, Ayad Al Adhamy, Calvin Langman; Mixed By Danielle Warman & Jon Altschiller; Mastered By Craig Almquist; Formats: CD, Vinyl, Digital Download, LP

=== EPs ===
Title	Details
Tenderly	
Awfully Apeelin'	Released: August 26, 2016; Engineer and Producer: Matt Maroulakos; Formats: Digital Download, Vinyl

=== Singles ===
Title	Year	Album/EP
"Right Through"	2017	Awfully Apeelin'
"Another Try"	2021	Under the Shade of Green
"Changes"	2022	Under the Shade of Green
"Dance Alone"	2022	Under the Shade of Green
"Do Your Worst"	2022	Under the Shade of Green
"Around and Around"	2022	Under the Shade of Green
"Everything You Do"	2025	Lovesick
"Cruel Power"	2025	Lovesick
"Wild in Love"	2025	Lovesick
"Do You See Me?"	2025	Lovesick
"Black Hole"	2025	Lovesick
"Tenderly"	2026	

== Band members ==
Current

- Calvin Langman – lead vocals, cello
- Luke Davis – backing vocals, drums
- Nico Rose - backing vocals, guitar
- Raina Mullen - backing vocals, guitar

Former

- Ross Monteith – vocals, guitars

Timeline

== Awards ==
- Makin Waves Band of the Year (2022)

== Tours ==
- Lovesick Tour 2026
- Lovesick Tour 2025 (UK/EU/US Tour with multiple other bands)
- Do You Ever Wonder Tour 2024 (UK/EU tour with Bears in Trees)
- Under the Shade of Green Tour 2023
- Across the Pond Tour 2022
- Under the Shade of Green Tour 2022
- WCBB Tour 2022
- What Could Be Better Tour 2021
- The Happy Fits Spring Tour 2020 (cancelled due to the COVID-19 pandemic)
- The Happy Fits (2019)
- Little Light Tour 2019 (as support for This Wild Life)
- The Happy Fits & Deal Casino (2019)
- Eat Your Fruits Tour 2018
- The Happy Fits Spring Tour 2018
