= Joe Innes & The Cavalcade =

- Origin: London, England, UK
- Genres: Alternative, Folk
- Years active: 2011–present
- Website: www.joeinnes.com

Joe Innes is an English British singer and songwriter from London who plays solo and with his band The Cavalcade. Joe has previously played in several lineups including a band with drummer Matt Thomas from The Joy Formidable.

Their debut album The Frighteners was released in April 2012, receiving support from BBC Radio 6 Music DJs Tom Robinson, Steve Lamacq and Huw Stephens, and gaining coverage from webzines This is Fake DIY which described Joe as "a master of words", and Thank Folk For That who praised the album's "addictive wit". Their follow up EP Brian, I'm a Genius Too was released in June 2014, and their second album Foreign Domestic Policy was released in May 2017.
