= Sarah's Song =

"Sarah's Song" may refer to:

- "Sarah's Song", by Madness (2002)
- "Sarah's Song", by the Happy Fits (2025)
