= Rowntree (surname) =

Rountree is an English surname, a variant of Rountree.

Of note is the Rowntree family, founders of Rowntree's, a confectionery company in York, England. Notable people with the surname include:

=== Rowntree's company family and close relatives ===
- Arnold Stephenson Rowntree (1872–1951), Liberal MP for York
- Benjamin Seebohm Rowntree (1871–1954), sociologist and businessman, also known as Seebohm Rowntree
- Henry Isaac Rowntree (1837–1883), founder of the business
- John Stephenson Rowntree (1834–1907)
- John Wilhelm Rowntree (1868–1905), chocolate manufacturer and religious activist
- Joseph Rowntree (educationist) (1801–1859), education leader
- Joseph Rowntree (philanthropist) (1836–1925), cocoa and chocolate manufacturer and philanthropist
- Joshua Rowntree (1844–1915), social reformer
- Michael Rowntree (1919–2007), journalist and philanthropist
- Tessa Rowntree (1909–1999), aid worker in Czechoslovakia, 1938–1939

=== Other persons ===
- Joseph Rowntree (Canadian) pioneer of Thistletown, miller on the banks of the Humber River in 1843
- Fred Rowntree (1860–1927), Scottish architect
- Lester Gertrude Ellen Rowntree (1879–1979), American botanist and horticulturist
- Leonard Rowntree (1883–1959), Canadian physician and medical researcher
- Richard Rowntree (1884–1968), English-born New Zealand cricketer
- Norman Rowntree (1912–1991), British civil engineer
- Leslie Rowntree (1914–1975), Canadian political figure
- Diana Rowntree (1915–2008), British architect and writer
- Kenneth Rowntree (1915–1997), British artist
- Gil Rowntree (born 1934), Canadian racehorse trainer and owner
- Mark Rowntree (born c. 1956), British spree killer
- Dave Rowntree (born 1964), British musician
- Graham Rowntree (born 1971), English rugby union player and coach
- Catriona Rowntree (born 1971), Australian television personality

== See also ==
- Roundtree
