= Fred Hawthorne Minor =

American politician and lawyer (1888–1976)

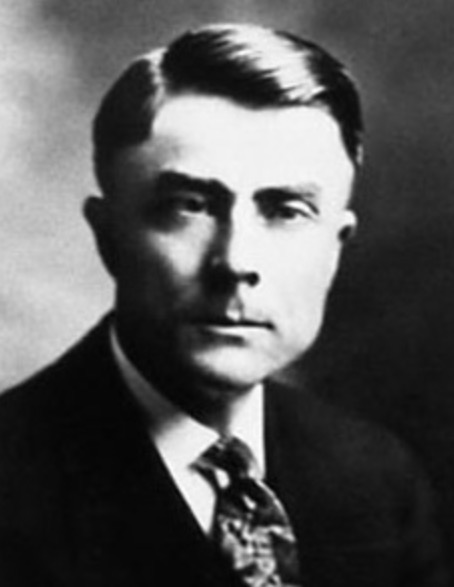
- Minor's portrait for the 40th Texas Legislature

Member of the Texas House of Representatives from the 49th district
- In office January 11, 1927 – January 10, 1933
- Preceded by: James Madison Coffey
- Succeeded by: Tom Bullock Hyder

Speaker of the Texas House of Representatives
- In office January 13, 1931 – January 10, 1933
- Preceded by: Wingate S. Barron
- Succeeded by: Coke R. Stevenson

Personal details
- Born: December 11, 1888 Lewisville, Texas, US
- Died: April 24, 1976 (aged 87) Denton, Texas, US
- Party: Democratic
- Occupation: Politician, lawyer

Fred Hawthorne Minor (December 11, 1888 – April 24, 1976) was an American politician and lawyer. A Democrat, he was a member of the Texas House of Representatives, including a term as Speaker of the House.

== Early life and education ==
Minor was born on December 11, 1888, near Lewisville, Texas, the son of John Rufus Minor and Elizabeth Matilda (née Boyd) Minor. Educated at local schools, he studied at the University of North Texas and earned a teaching certificate. North Texas later named him a distinguished alumnus.

For the four years that followed, Minor taught at an elementary school. He then studied at the University of Texas at Austin School of Law, graduating as valedictorian in 1916, with a Bachelor of Laws. He worked as a teaching assistant there for the following ywar.

== Career ==
Minor was chairman of the Denton County Democratic Party from 1918 to 1924. He was a member of the Texas House of Representatives, from January 11, 1927, to January 10, 1933, representing the 49th district. From January 13, 1931, to January 10, 1933, he was Speaker of the House, being unanimously elected after Wingate S. Barron left office due to illness.

While serving, Minor passed laws to protect the East Texas Oil Field, which he called his most important legislation. He was chairman of the Committee on the Judiciary, as well as a member of the Committees on Appropriations; on Claims and Accounts; on Education; and on Penitentiaries.

Minor was a delegate to the 1932 Democratic National Convention, and was an alternate delegate for the 1940 convention. From 1943, until his resignation on September 29, 1948, he was a member of the Texas Alcoholic Beverage Commission, serving as chairman in the final year and being appointed by Governor Coke R. Stevenson.

From 1917 until his death, Minor practiced law in Denton. From c. 1937, he was a lawyer from Denton County National Bank, becoming its president in 1956. He was a member of the Texas Judicial Council for two years. For eight years, he was a member of Denton City Council, and for sixteen years was a member of the Denton Board of Education; he was chairman of the City Council for one term, and was president of the Board of Education for twelve years.

== Personal life and death ==
In August 1920, Minor married Katherine Louise Johnson, with whom he had one child. He was a member of the Freemasons, Kiwanis, and the Knights of Pythias. He died on April 24, 1976, aged 87, in Denton, and was buried at Roselawn Cemetery, in Denton.
