= Tricky Nixon =

English pop rock band

- Origin: Manchester
- Genres: Indie rock, indie pop
- Years active: 2003–2006
- Label: Fuzzbox
- Past members: Rhydian Dafydd – vocals / guitar Ritzy Bryan – vocals / guitar Peter Gray – drums Joe Fairclough – bass

Tricky Nixon was a four-piece band from Manchester, England and was a former band of The Joy Formidable's vocalist/guitarist Ritzy Bryan and bassist Rhydian Dafydd. Their music has been described as "sleazy The Breeders guitar thrash and tasty harmonies, with sugar and spike boy-girl vocals and pummelling Pixies bass and drums." Their Welsh language song "Paid A Gofyn" ("Don't Ask") was citied by Hefin Thomas on the BBC Radio Cymru website as "one of their top 10 favourite Welsh tracks of the decade" in 2009.

== History ==
=== Formation ===
Tricky Nixon formed in summer 2003 as Super 8's after the three founder members vocalist/guitarist Rhydian Dafydd, bassist Joe Fairclough and drummer Peter Gray recruited Ritzy Bryan as the second guitarist.

=== Shows and early recordings ===
The band initially put out a demo made up of three songs "Taxman", "All Over You" and "In My Head" that the band had already recorded for an album length demo.

During the In the City festival in Manchester, 2003, the band name changed from Super 8's to Tricky Nixon.

In 2004 the first release from Tricky Nixon was an EP featuring three new tracks "Takin The Bait", "Jelly" and "You're So Money".

The EP was well received and the band were able to secure a national tour supporting Ariel X in April and several good support slots, most notably with Kaiser Chiefs.

During that summer the band recorded a cover of The Smiths' "Panic" for Concrete Recordings' Ten From Ten compilation album.

=== Mclusky tour and Kick EP ===
In November 2004 the band embarked on their highest profile tour to date supporting alternative rock band Mclusky.

The band's final release was six track Kick EP through Fuzzbox on 21 November 2005.

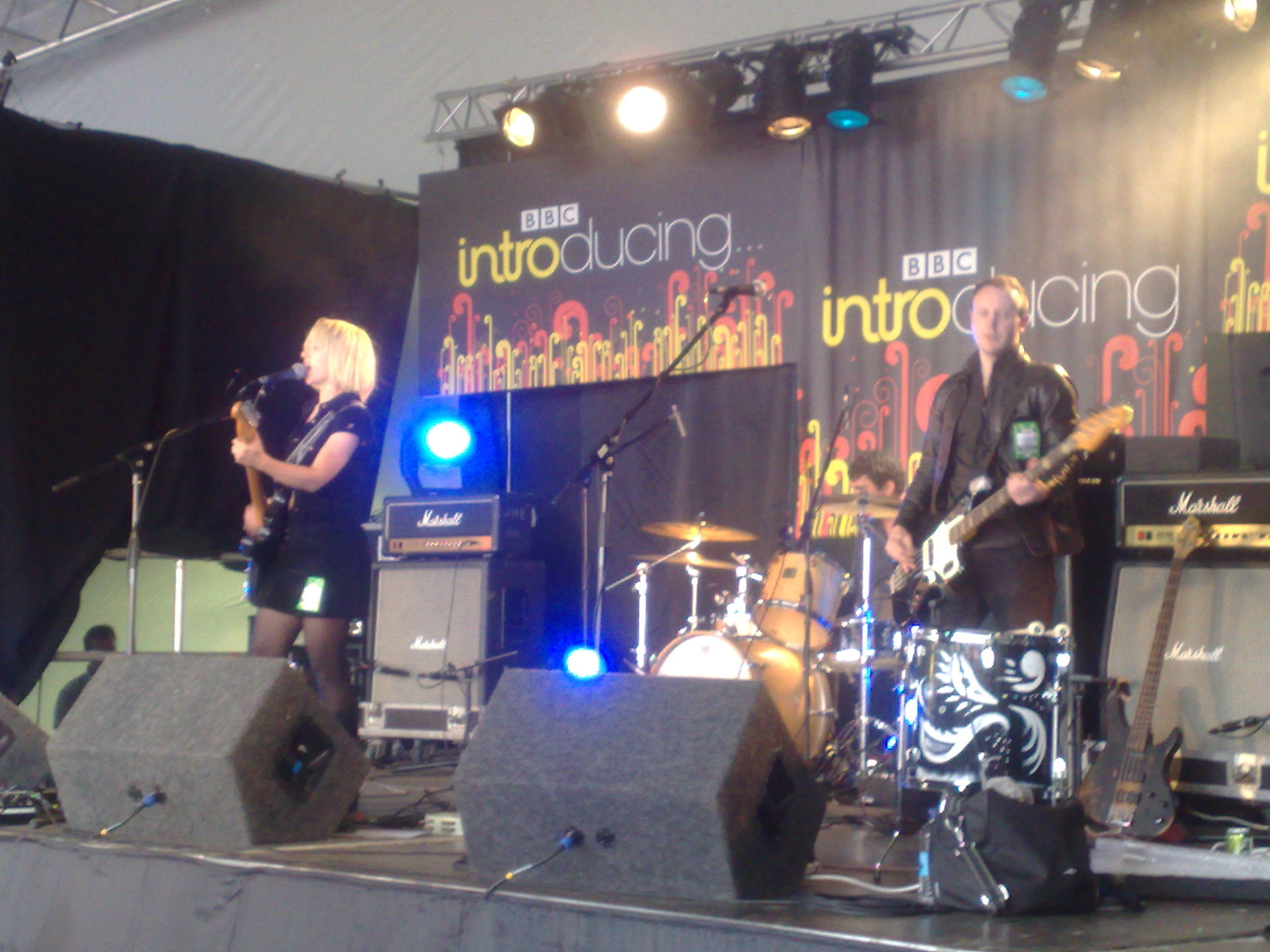
The Joy Formidable

=== Breakup and post-Tricky Nixon ===
In January 2006 drummer Peter Gray quit the band.

The remaining three members of the band formed new wave/post-punk band Sidecar Kisses and following Sidecar Kisses' dissolution, Ritzy Bryan and Rhydian Dafydd went on to form art rock/indie pop band The Joy Formidable.

Peter Gray joined surf music/sci-fi group The VCs and more recently Manchester band Letters To Fiesta.

== Discography ==
=== Demos ===
- Benedict (2003) (CD)
- Super 8's EP (2003) (CD)
- Takin The Bait EP (Jan 2004) (CD)

=== Compilations ===
- Panic (1 November 2004) (CD/vinyl/download)
- Paid a Gofyn (19 October 2005) (download)

=== Singles ===
- "Kick" (21 November 2005) (CD/download)
