= Rowntree =

Rowntree may refer to:

- Rowntree (surname)
- Rowntree's, a confectionery company in York, England previously owned by members of the Rowntree family
- Rowntree trusts
  - Joseph Rowntree Charitable Trust
  - Joseph Rowntree Foundation
- Rowntree Park, a 20-acre (8.1 ha), a park in York, England
