= Rountree, Springfield =

Neighborhood in Springfield, Missouri, U.S.

Coordinates: 37.201°N 93.270°W

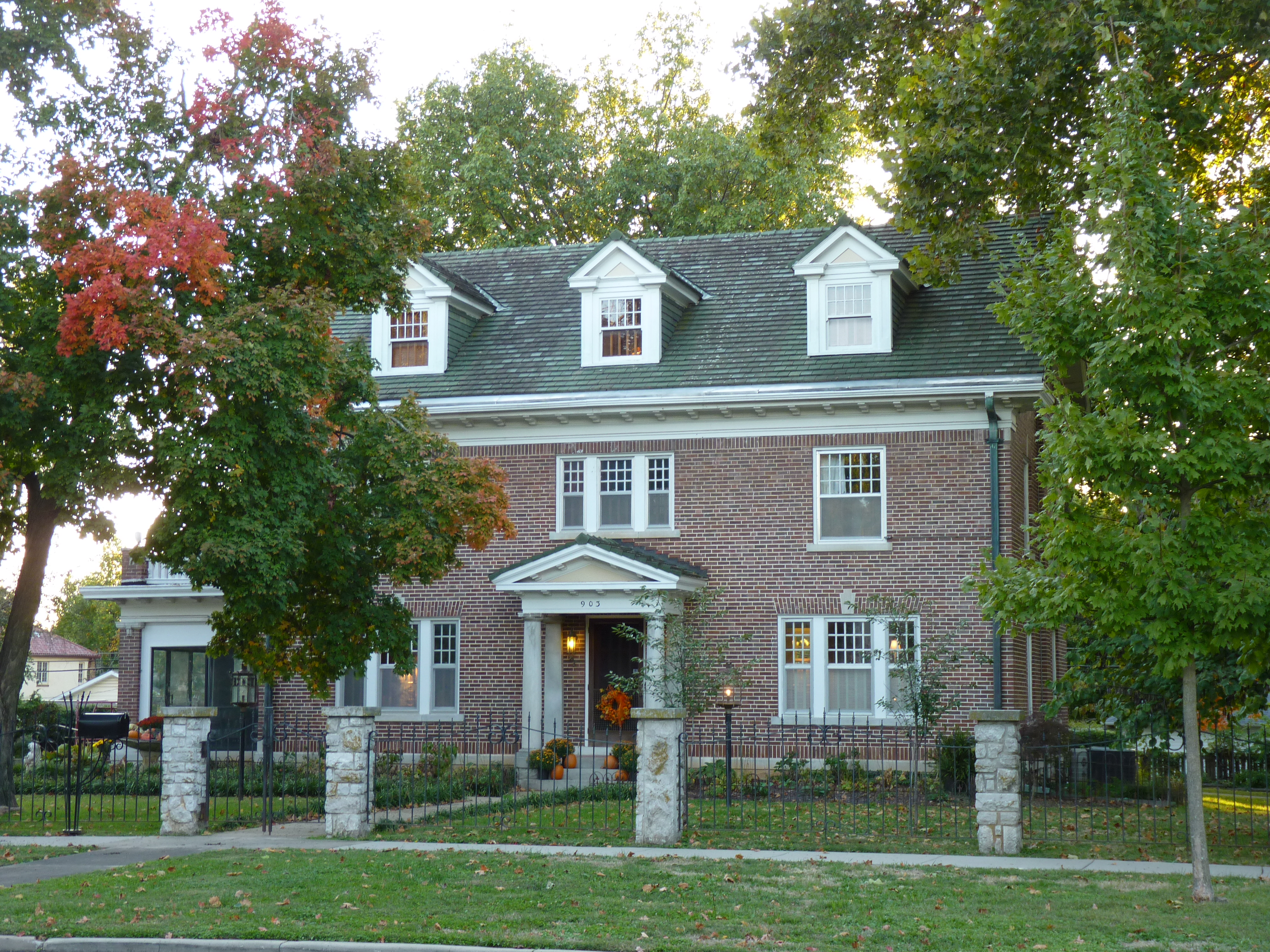
Edward M. and Della C. Wilhoit House located in Rountree was added to the National Register of Historic Places in 2004.

Rountree is a neighborhood in central Springfield, Missouri. The neighborhood's borders are marked by Missouri State University to the west, Glenstone Avenue to the east, Catalpa Street to the south, and Cherry Street to the north.

While predominantly a residential neighborhood, the neighborhood has a collection of restaurants, bakeries, and other businesses. Its northern "Pickwick Place" corridor has been labeled a model "complete neighborhood" by planners with the city of Springfield.

The neighborhood's name derives from the N.M. Rountree Elementary School, located within the neighborhood on Grand Street. The school, in turn, is named the founder of the historic Keet-Rountree store in Springfield. The neighborhood hosts annual Fourth of July and Halloween parades that draw hundreds from around the city. Rountree is regularly ranked by 417 Magazine as among Springfield's best neighborhoods.

The homes in Rountree were constructed during the 1910s and 1920s, and feature a diverse array of styles—including examples of Craftsman, Foursquare, and Federalist styles. One home, the brick Georgian Revival Edward M. and Della C. Wilhoit House, was added to National Register of Historic Places in 2004.

Rountree, like other neighborhoods in central Springfield, is markedly more liberal in its voting patterns than other parts of the city. This may be due to its close proximity to the Missouri State University campus.
