= E. M. Wilhoit Building =

- U.S. National Register of Historic Places
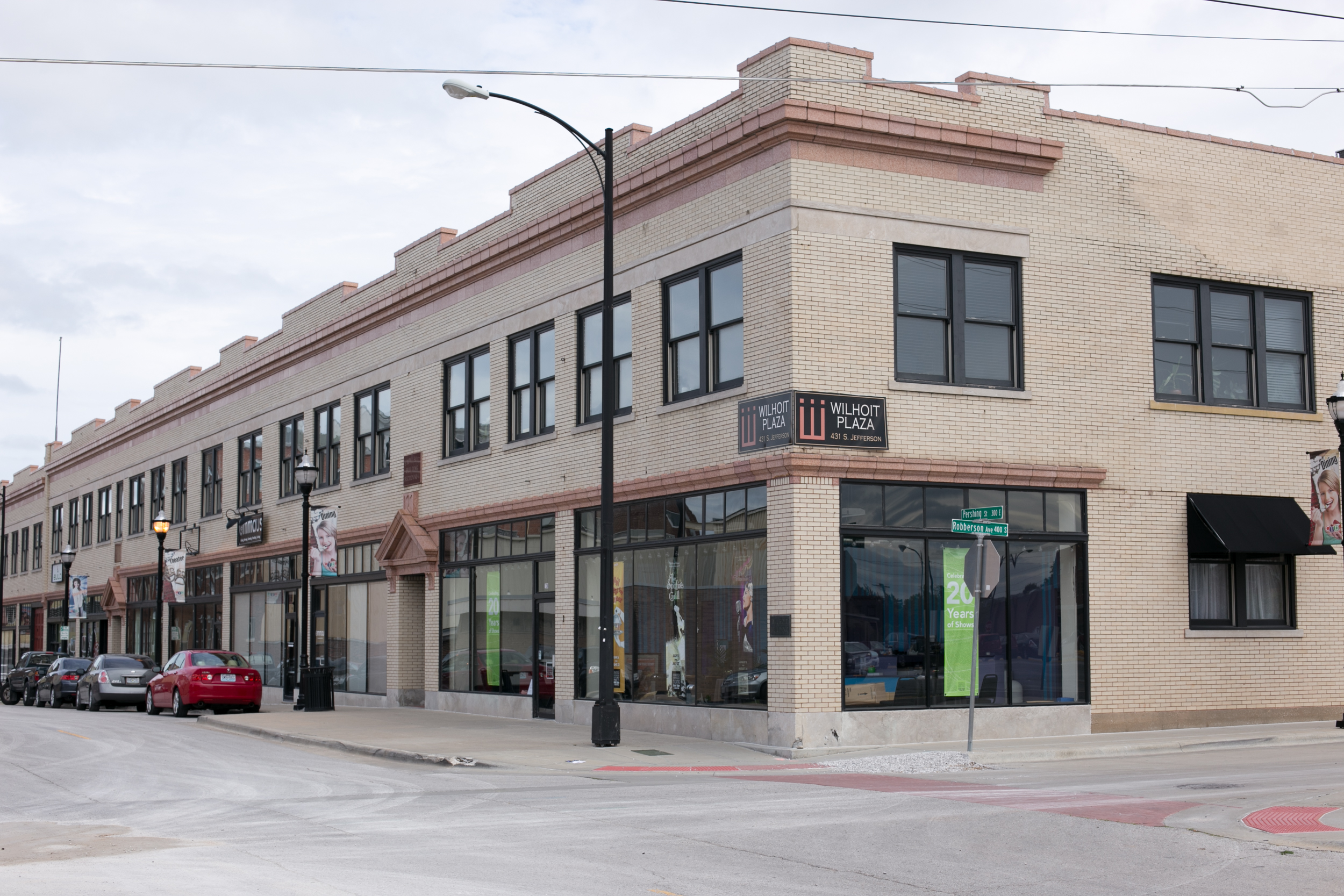
- E. M. Wilhoit Building, September 2014

- Location within Missouri Location within the United States
- Location: 300-330 E. Pershing St., Springfield, Missouri
- Coordinates: 37°12′29″N 93°17′25″W
- Area: 2.5 acres (1.0 ha)
- Built: 1926
- Architect: Reed, George F.
- Architectural style: Commercial Block
- MPS: Springfield, Missouri MPS (Additional Documentation)
- NRHP reference No.: 04001576
- Added to NRHP: January 31, 2005

E. M. Wilhoit Building is a historic commercial building located at Springfield, Greene County, Missouri. It was built about 1926, and is a two-story, tan brick and concrete commercial building. It has a flat roof and stepped parapet with terra cotta coping. It features Colonial Revival-style influences. It was built by Edward M. Wilhoit, who also built the Edward M. and Della C. Wilhoit House.

It was listed on the National Register of Historic Places in 2005.
