= Sun Bronzed Greek Gods =

Sun Bronzed Greek Gods EP

EP by Dom
- Released: February 15, 2010 re-released on April 5, 2010 re-released on February 11, 2011
- Recorded: 2010, Erik's apartment
- Genre: Indie rock, synthpop
- Length: 19:04
- Label: Burning Mill (2010); Astralwerks/Capitol (2011)

Dom chronology
Sun Bronzed Greek Gods EP (2010)	Family of Love (2011)

Professional ratings
Review scores
Source	Rating
AllMusic	2.5/5 stars
Pitchfork Media	(8/10)

Sun Bronzed Greek Gods is the debut EP by American indie pop band Dom, released in 2010 on Burning Mill Records.

On April 5, 2010, the album was re-released. On February 11, 2011, it was re-released again with a new cover, remastered audio and an iTunes bonus track, "Beth". The track "Living In America" was featured in the video game Grand Theft Auto V for its PlayStation 4 and Xbox One re-release on the in-game radio station Radio Mirror Park.

== Track listing ==
No.	Title	Length
1.	"Jesus"	2:05
2.	"Living in America"	3:06
3.	"Rude as Jude"	2:46
4.	"Bochicha"	2:21
5.	"Burn Bridges"	2:58
6.	"Hunny"	2:53
7.	"I Wonder"	2:55
Total length:		19:04
