= Ordinaire EP =

Ordinaire

EP by Stepdad
- Released: April 24, 2010; September 6, 2011 (re-release)
- Genre: Synthpop, electronic
- Length: 40:09
- Label: Quite Scientific
- Producer: Ryan McCarthy

Stepdad chronology
Ordinaire (2010)	Wildlife Pop (2012)

Professional ratings
Review scores
Source	Rating
Sputnikmusic	4/5 stars
PopMatters	7/10 stars

Ordinaire is the first EP by the pop band Stepdad. It was self-released on April 24, 2010 through Bandcamp, and re-released on September 6, 2011 by Quite Scientific Records.

The entire EP was recorded and mixed in Ryan McCarthy's bedroom.

The lead single, "My Leather, My Fur, My Nails", was named the seventh best song of the year by The Pop Sucker's top songs of 2010.

== Track listing ==
All tracks are written by ultramark and Ryan McCarthy.

No.	Title	Length
1.	"Jungles"	4:42
2.	"Squares"	4:12
3.	"Wolf Slaying as a Hobby"	3:44
4.	"My Leather, My Fur, My Nails"	4:27
5.	"Cutie Boots"	4:08
6.	"Baby Hammers"	3:51
7.	"Parrot"	3:29
8.	"Kings and Centipedes"	3:32
9.	"Find Love (Bonus Track)"	4:25
10.	"Magic Stones (Bonus Track)"	3:44
Total length:		40:09

== Notes ==
The songs, "Find Love" and "Magic Stones", only appear on the re-released version of the EP.
