= Lee J. Rountree =

American politician and newspaperman (1868–1923)

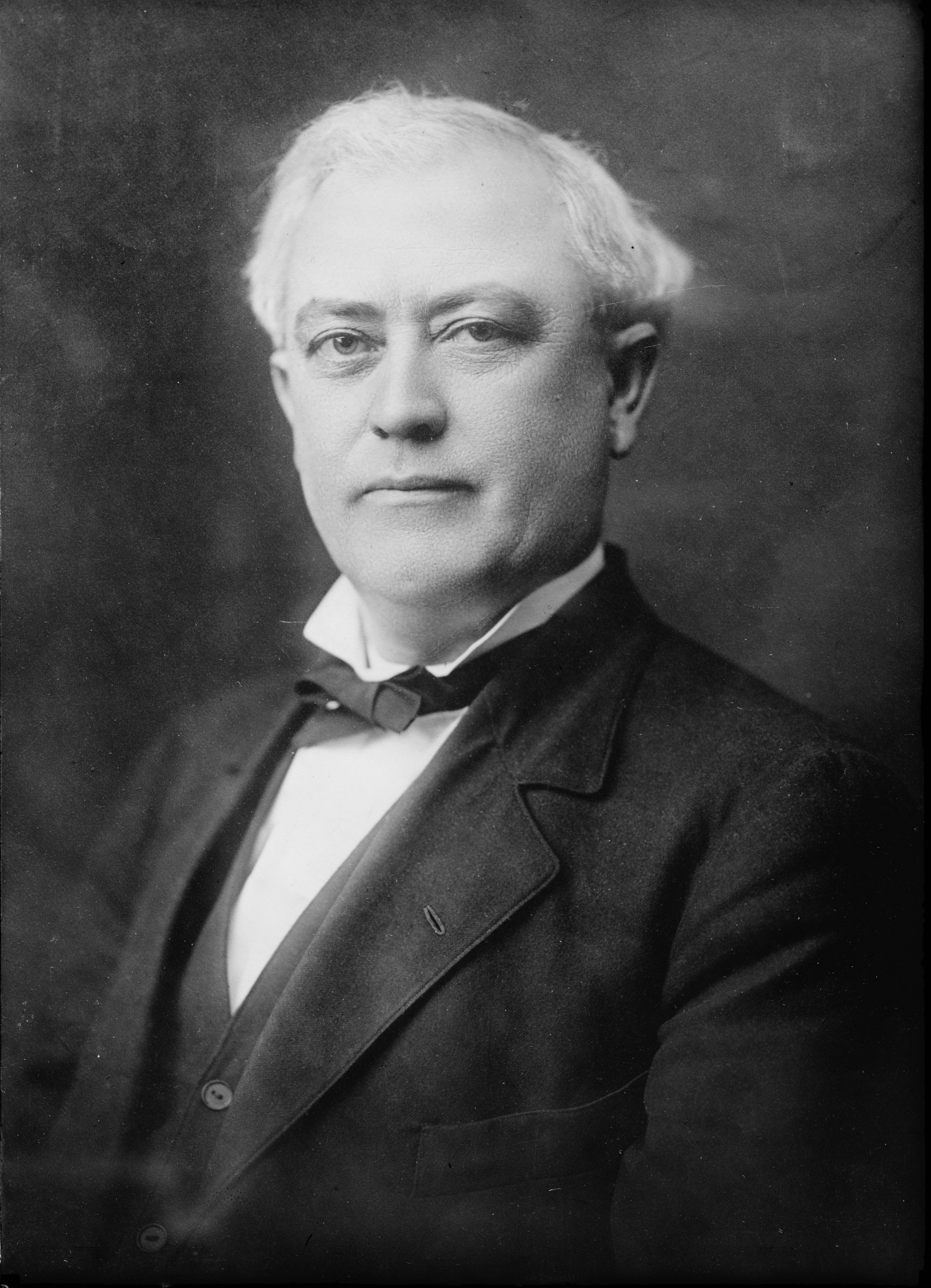
- Rountree c. 1910 – c. 1915, by George Grantham Bain

Member of the Texas House of Representatives
- In office January 11, 1921 – May 2, 1923
- Preceded by: James Green McDonald Jr.
- Succeeded by: Wingate S. Barron
- Constituency: 22nd district (1921–1923); 26th district (1923)

Personal details
- Born: Leonidas Johnson Rountree; July 15, 1868 Kyle, Texas, US
- Died: May 2, 1923 (aged 54) Austin, Texas, US
- Party: Democratic
- Spouse: Frances Mitchell Rountree (m. 1902–1923)
- Relations: Samuel Johnson (grandfather)
- Occupation: Politician, newspaperman

Leonidas Johnson Rountree (July 15, 1868 – May 2, 1923) was an American politician and newspaperman. A Democrat, he was a member of the Texas House of Representatives from 1921 until his death. He was the husband of Frances Mitchell Rountree.

== Early life ==
Rountree was born on July 15, 1868, in Kyle, Texas, though The Political Graveyard claims he was born in Dripping Springs. He was the grandson of Samuel Johnson. He was raised in Kyle, receiving his education and beginning his newspaper career, as an editor of a local paper. On April 2, 1902, he married Frances Mitchell Rountree; they had no children together.

== Career ==
Rountree was the Chief Clerk of the Texas House of Representatives for several terms. He then moved to Georgetown, founding The Georgetown Commercial. For between fifteen and twenty years, he managed and edited the paper.

Rountree then moved to Sulphur Springs, where he edited a paper for between several months to several years. In 1919 or 1920, he purchased The Bryan Daily Eagle, moving to Bryan. He was president of the National Newspaper Association for a term and was orator of the Texas Press Association for several years.

Rountree was a Democrat. He was a member of the Texas House of Representatives, from January 11, 1921, until his death. In his first term, he represented the 22nd district, and in his second term, the 26th. He was appointed to the office. Ideologically, he was progressive.

While serving, Rountree worked to improve the Brazos River Authority. He was chairman of the Committee on Conservation and Reclamation, and was a member of the Committees on Appropriations; on Congressional Districts; on Constitutional Amendments; on Municipal and Private Corporations; and on Revenue and Taxation.

Rountree was a proposed candidate in the 1924 Texas lieutenant gubernatorial election.

== Personal life and death ==
Rountree traveled Europe, South America, and the United States. He was a member of the Benevolent and Protective Order of Elks, the Freemasons (including the Knights Templar, the Shriners), the Independent Order of Odd Fellows, and the Knights of Pythias. He was Methodist.

Rountree died on May 2, 1923, aged 54, at the Texas State Capitol in Austin. He died from a stroke of apoplexy, three minutes after delivering the speech "Flowers to the Living", in which he thanked the surviving member of the Texas Brigade, who had sent him a boquet of flowers. He had complained of exhaustion in the days prior. He was buried on May 4, at the Bryan City Cemetery.
