= Wolf's Law =

- Album cover art by Martin Wittfooth

Studio album by The Joy Formidable
- Released: 21 January 2013 (UK); 22 January 2013 (US)
- Recorded: North Wales, London and Sebago Lake, Maine
- Genre: Alternative rock, shoegazing, dream pop
- Length: 52:52
- Label: Atlantic
- Producer: The Joy Formidable

The Joy Formidable chronology
The Big More (2011)	Wolf's Law (2013)	Hitch (2016)

Singles from Wolf's Law
- 1. "Cholla" Released: 6 September 2012; 2. "This Ladder Is Ours" Released: 9 October 2012; 3. "Silent Treatment" Released: 9 July 2013

Wolf's Law is the second full-length studio album from Welsh alternative rock band the Joy Formidable. The album was released on 21 January 2013 in the United Kingdom, and on 22 January 2013 in the United States, on Atlantic Records.

== Background and recording ==
Writing for Wolf's Law was primarily done on the road during the 12-month period that the band toured in support of their previous record, The Big Roar. Commenting on the writing process for the album, guitarist and lead vocalist Ritzy Bryan explained that the songs for the album were approached with vocals and one accompaniment (either guitar or piano) before being built upon, stating, "It's all about the lyrics, the voice and the melody". In regards to the band's writing process, bassist Rhydian Dafydd explained, "We always write what's close to our hearts. Every lyric on this album means something - the same as the last record". The album was recorded in various places, with vocals and guitars recorded in January 2012 in Sebago Lake, Maine, while drums and additional orchestral and choir pieces for the record were scored and recorded by the band in February 2012 in London. A total of 13 songs were recorded, of which 11 were included on the final album; the extra song, "A Minute's Silence", was issued as a limited edition 12" single on 20 April 2013 for Record Store Day. Mixing duties for the record were handled by Andy Wallace while the record's production was completed by the band.

The album title is a reference to Wolff's law, a scientific theory by Julius Wolff which posits that bones may become stronger in response to stress as a form of adaptation. According to Bryan, this relates to one of the major themes of the album, which is "relationships on the mend and feeling reinvigorated", and she said that the album feels like the band reconnecting with themselves emotionally and spiritually. The album was also said to have been partially influenced by nature, social issues and Native American mythology. "The Leopard and the Lung" was said to have been inspired by activist Wangari Maathai.

== Release and promotion ==
Three music videos were released to promote the album. The first video to be released was for the album's hidden title track. The song was made available for free download by joining the band's email list. Music videos for "Cholla" and "This Ladder Is Ours" were also released. The album was made available for streaming through Rolling Stone on 16 January 2013. On 22 January 2013, Wolf's Law was released worldwide by Atlantic Records on CD, digital download and limited-edition vinyl.

"Little Blimp" had previously been included on the soundtrack of Need for Speed: Most Wanted, released on 30 October 2012.

== Critical reception ==
Professional ratings
Aggregate scores
Source	Rating
Metacritic	73/100
Review scores
Source	Rating
Allmusic	4/5 stars
BBC	favorable
Consequence of Sound	3/5 stars
Drowned in Sound	6/10
Filter	80%
The Guardian	4/5 stars
NME	6/10
Pitchfork	7.2
Rolling Stone	3.5/5 stars
Slant Magazine	3/5 stars
Spin	7/10

The album has received mainly positive reviews from music critics. The aggregate review site Metacritic assigned an average score of 73 to the album based on 31 reviews, indicating "generally favorable reviews".

In a positive review by AP, reviewer Paul J. Weber characterized the album as "wonderfully noisy and hooky, shimmering with guitar-pop accessibility". Steven Hyden of Pitchfork compared the album to The Big Roar, stating, "If anything, Wolf's Law is a weirder, proggier record that explores a wider range of textures and sounds than the relatively monochromatic Roar". In a similar statement concerning the album's dynamics, Arnold Pan of Pop Matters commented, "The Joy Formidable proves on Wolf’s Law that it can create grandeur and awe by letting contrast and touch speak volumes more than overpowering brute force can". The lyrics on the album were also praised, with Noel Murray of The A.V. Club claiming that "...the most important trick that The Joy Formidable finesses is to take that sense of grandeur and apply it to today’s world, to ordinary people trying to cope with stress and loneliness".

In a somewhat mixed response, Jon Dolan of Rolling Stone expressed, "At times, it feels like they're glue-gunning hot ideas rather than writing fully realized songs, but they've come up with some fine Frankensteins nonetheless". Critiquing the album's production, Jeremy D. Larson of Consequence of Sound noted, "Wolf’s Law sounds like it was caught in the Muse Trap", explaining that "Bryan’s lacquered riffs on “Cholla” and “Bats” are so pop and polished there’s hardly any friction between her, Thomas, and bassist Rhydian Dafydd". Sam Shepherd of musicOMH similarly stated, "Everything is engineered to sound massive, even the ballads. It is polished to such a degree that it loses the edge that made the band’s earlier work so exciting".

== Commercial performance ==
In the United States, the album debuted at No. 51 on the Billboard 200, No. 16 on the Rock Albums and No. 11 on the Alternative Albums charts, with around 8,000 copies sold in its first week. The album has sold 25,000 copies in the US as of February 2016.

== Track listing ==
All tracks are written by Ritzy Bryan and Rhydian Dafydd of the Joy Formidable

No.	Title	Length
1.	"This Ladder Is Ours"	5:12
2.	"Cholla"	3:23
3.	"Tendons"	4:19
4.	"Little Blimp"	2:52
5.	"Bats"	3:48
6.	"Silent Treatment"	3:39
7.	"Maw Maw Song"	6:47
8.	"Forest Serenade"	4:22
9.	"The Leopard and the Lung"	6:00
10.	"The Hurdle"	3:59
11.	"The Turnaround" (includes hidden track, "Wolf's Law")	9:34
Total length:		52:52

== Personnel ==
Wolf's Law album personnel adapted from the CD liner notes.

The Joy Formidable

- Ritzy Bryan – composer, guitar, vocals
- Rhydian Dafydd – bass, composer, vocals
- Matt Thomas – drums

Additional album personnel

- Joy Smith – harp
- Tercia Realidad – strings
- Jorge Jimenez – violin, direction
- James O'Toole – violin
- Emma Alter – violin
- Henrik Persson – cello
- Xavier Stephenson – drum engineer, assistant string engineer
- Liam Nolan – assistant drum engineer, assistant string engineer
- Sam Wheat – string engineer
- Paul Suarez – ProTools engineer
- Neak Mentor – assistant engineer
- Brian Montgomery – assistant engineer
- Andy Wallace – mixing
- Bob Ludwig – mastering
- Steve Ralbovsky – A&R
- Martin Wittfooth – paintings, album artwork
- James Minchin III – photo (band photo)
- Alex R. Kirzhner – design

== Charts ==
Chart	Peak position
Billboard 200	51
Billboard Alternative Albums	11
Billboard Internet Albums	15
Billboard Rock Albums	16
Billboard Tastemaker Albums	5
UK Albums Chart	41
