= Wingate S. Barron =

American politician and lawyer (1889–1984)

- Barron's portrait for the 40th Texas Legislature

Member of the Texas House of Representatives from the 26th district
- In office January 13, 1925 – January 13, 1931
- Preceded by: Lee J. Rountree
- Succeeded by: Frances Mitchell Rountree

Speaker of the Texas House of Representatives
- In office January 8, 1929 – January 13, 1931
- Preceded by: Robert L. Bobbitt
- Succeeded by: Fred Hawthorne Minor

Personal details
- Born: Wingate Stuart Barron; February 6, 1889 Rock Prairie, Texas, US
- Died: December 2, 1984 (aged 95) Bryan, Texas, US
- Occupation: Politician, lawyer

Wingate Stuart Barron Sr. (February 6, 1889 – February 12, 1984) was an American politician and lawyer. A Democrat, he was a member of the Texas House of Representatives, including a term as Speaker of the Texas House of Representatives.

== Early life and education ==
Barron was born on February 6, 1889, in Rock Prairie, Texas, a settlement in Brazos County, the son of John Marion and Johnnie Frances (née Gilbert) Barron. In 1899, he and his family moved to Grimes County. Educated at the Allen Academy, he earned a teaching certificate from Sam Houston State University and a degree from the University of Texas at Austin School of Law.

== Career ==
Barron worked as an educator, and in 1910, he was the school superintendent of Grimes County. At some point he unsuccessfully ran for county attorney of Madison County. He began practicing law in 1914, in Anderson, moving to Bryan in 1917.

Barron was a Democrat. He was a member of the Texas House of Representatives, from January 13, 1925, to January 13, 1931, representing the 26th district. He was Speaker of the House, from January 8, 1929, to January 13, 1931, though his work as Speaker was limited by illness. While serving, he was a member of the Committees on Appropriations; on Insurance; on the Judiciary; on Penitentiaries; on Revenue and Taxation; on Rules; and on State Affairs. He pushed for improvements to public education.

Barron was recommended to run for statewide office, though he instead chose to return to practicing law. During the Great Depression, he was a local secretary and treasurer of the Farm Credit System, helping farmers obtain land loans. From 1940, until his retirement in 1955, he was judge of the 85th judicial district. From 1956 to 1959, he was a member of the State Bar of Texas board of directors.

== Personal life and death ==
By 1917, Barron was married to Ethel G. Sanders; they were recorded as having four children in the 1930 United States census. Before 1940, he married Bess DuBois. He was a Baptist and a Freemason. He died on February 12, 1984, aged 95, in Bryan, and was buried at Bryan City Cemetery. He was the longest-living Speaker of the Texas House.
