= We Barbarians =

US musical group

- Origin: Long Beach, California, United States
- Genres: Indie rock, Alternative rock
- Years active: 2007–present
- Members: David Quon; Derek Van Heule; Nathan Warkentin
- Website: Official site

We Barbarians were an American three-piece indie rock band based in Brooklyn, originally from Long Beach, California. The band consisted of David Quon, Derek VanHeule, and Nathan Warkentin. Their debut studio album, There's This There's That, was released on December 15, 2009. The band's latest EP, Headspace, was released August 30, 2011.

== History ==
We Barbarians were composed of three friends who grew up playing together in Long Beach, California. They formed in 2007 after their previous group, The Colour, disbanded. The band's indie bluesy-rock sound has often garnered comparisons to U2 and The Clash.

Their first EP, In The Doldrums, was released November 1, 2007. Their debut album, There's This There's That, followed on December 15, 2009.

On August 30, 2011, the band released their sophomore EP, Headspace. The album was produced by Dann Gallucci (of Modest Mouse and Murder City Devils) and received critical acclaim.

We Barbarians have toured with Foster the People, Cold War Kids, Local Natives, and Passion Pit. They performed at the 2011 SXSW Festival. The band has received praise for their live performances from numerous press outlets and is currently embarking on a headlining tour in support of Headspace.

During the summer of 2011, We Barbarians returned to Brooklyn, New York, where they were the opening act for White Rabbits.

Their latest LP, There's This There's That, Although alerting similarities of songs from bands such as U2 may run throughout the album, We Barbarians makes the traditional indie-rock band sound their own.

Early on in their career, before they relocated to Brooklyn, We Barbarians developed a reputation for its boisterous live shows and thus garnered praise from outlets including the Los Angeles Times and KEXP of Seattle.

With similar artists such as Razorlight, Cold War Kids, The Morning Benders, and Delta Spirit, We Barbarians is expanding its post-punk sound to other alternative and ambient tastes. The band is known to be influenced by The Strokes and The Spoon Benders.

== Discography ==
=== Studio album ===
- There's This There's That (December 2009)

=== EPs ===
- In The Doldrums (November, 2007)
- "We Barbarians Daytrotter Session" (March 2008, Daytrotter)
- Headspace (August 2011)
- Mexico, NY (June 2013)
