= Helen Edmunds Moore =

American politician (1881–1968)

Helen Edmunds Moore (January 3, 1881 – September 20, 1968) was a Texan suffragist who became president of the Texas League of Women Voters and served three terms in the Texas House of Representatives. The Moore Memorial Public Library in Texas City, Texas, is named after her.

== Early life and early days in Texas City ==
Born as Sepha Helen Edmunds, she was the daughter of mechanical engineer J. H. Edmunds. She was born in Black River Falls, Wisconsin, on January 3, 1881. She worked as a nurse in Kansas City, married a railroad man whom she had treated there, and moved with him to Texas City, Texas in late 1905. She continued to work as a nurse in Texas City, providing the town's only medical care until 1907, when a doctor moved to the town. She also founded a reading room, a precursor to the town library, in 1914, and became founder and first president of the Texas City Red Cross in 1916. Her Red Cross unit helped supply bandages to American soldiers in Europe.

== Suffrage and activism ==
Moore helped campaign for women's right to vote in Texas, working for a 1915 constitutional amendment that failed to pass. She became an officer in the Texas Equal Suffrage Association, which became the Texas League of Women Voters in 1919 after the passage of the Nineteenth Amendment to the United States Constitution giving women the right to vote nationally. In 1923, she became president of the Texas League of Women Voters. In the US presidential elections of 1924 and 1928 she was one of Texas's delegates to the national conventions, She was a supporter of Miriam A. Ferguson as Texas governor, in part because of Ferguson's anti-Ku Klux Klan position and in part for her progressive social politics. She also supported the 1928 presidential campaign of Al Smith.

== Legislature ==
She was elected to the Texas House of Representatives in 1928, 1930, and 1934, in the 17th district. She writes "I decided to run for the legislature in 1929 because I thought a woman could pass some good laws." Her defeat in the 1932 primary was caused in part by miscommunications regarding alcohol prohibition, and in the 1934 campaign she was victorious after taking a stand against prohibition. As a legislator she worked to establish a state mental hospital and remove the mentally ill from the jails, to improve the state hospital and orphanage systems, to found the state board of education, to outlaw child labor, and to reduce working hours for women from 54 hours per week to 48 hours.

== Death and legacy ==
Edmunds died on September 20, 1968. Her residence, the Col. Hugh B. and Helen Moore House in Texas City, is listed on the National Register of Historic Places.
