= 1924 Texas lieutenant gubernatorial election =

- November 4, 1924
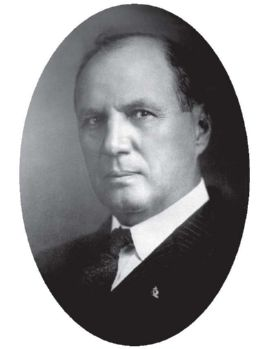

Nominee	Barry Miller	J. H. Kurth
Party	Democratic	Republican
Popular vote	526,100	175,546
Percentage	74.98%	25.02%
Lieutenant Governor before election
Thomas Whitfield Davidson
Democratic
Elected Lieutenant Governor
Barry Miller
Democratic

The 1924 Texas lieutenant gubernatorial election was held on November 4, 1924, in order to elect the lieutenant governor of Texas. Democratic nominee and former member of the Texas House of Representatives Barry Miller defeated Republican nominee J. H. Kurth.

== General election ==
On election day, November 4, 1924, Democratic nominee Barry Miller won the election by a margin of 350,554 votes against his opponent Republican nominee J. H. Kurth, thereby retaining Democratic control over the office of lieutenant governor. Miller was sworn in as the 28th lieutenant governor of Texas on January 20, 1925.

=== Results ===
Texas lieutenant gubernatorial election, 1924
Party	Candidate	Votes	%
Democratic	Barry Miller	526,100	74.98
Republican	J. H. Kurth	175,546	25.02
Total votes		701,646	100.00
Democratic hold			
