= Into the Blue (The Joy Formidable album) =

2021 studio album by the Joy Formidable

Studio album by The Joy Formidable
- Released: 20 August 2021
- Genres: Alternative rock, post-punk, alternative metal
- Length: 59:57
- Label: Hassle Records

The Joy Formidable chronology
AAARTH (2018)	Into the Blue (2021)

Alternative cover
- 2022 deluxe edition cover

Into the Blue
Review scores
Source	Rating
AllMusic	4/5 stars
The Revue	Favorable
The Line of Best Fit	8/10
Under the Radar	7.5/10
The A.V. Club	B−
DIY	2.5/5 stars

Into the Blue is the fifth studio album by the Welsh rock band The Joy Formidable. It was initially released on 20 August 2021, and was reissued in a deluxe edition with two additional songs on 14 September 2022. The album was written in the band's native Wales but recorded at their retreat in Utah, United States; the band described the setting in Utah as an inspiration for the album's sound and atmosphere.

== Critical reception ==
Upon its release, the album received generally favorable reviews from critics, but with some dissenters. AllMusic called the album "a shimmering batch of sun-baked, dune-high anthems" and a good example of the "poignant Zen alchemy that the Joy Formidable returns to time and again." The Revue noted that the album is a return to the band's roots while also sounding "more polished and mature" than their recent albums, concluding that "This LP showcases why The Joy Formidable are one of modern music's most powerful bands."

According to The Line of Best Fit, the album represents "a dynamic achieved without sacrificing the blisteringly euphoric appeal that has ensured their longevity." Under the Radar said of the album: "While not groundbreaking, Into the Blue is innovative in approach and original in delivery and listeners will certainly find some edgy and cool post-punk to latch on to."

A.V. Club issued a partially unfavorable review, opining that the band is in a "midlife crisis" and concluding that the album "strives against measure to rediscover the magic in the band's mix, yet continually gets caught trying to reconcile what's come before with a desire to see it all with fresh eyes." DIY Magazine also critiqued the album for adding little to the band's established sound.

== Track listing ==
All tracks are written by Ritzy Bryan and Rhydian Davies.

No.	Title	Length
1.	"Into the Blue"	5:21
2.	"Chimes"	3:54
3.	"Sevier"	3:57
4.	"Interval"	5:28
5.	"Farrago"	3:43
6.	"Gotta Feed My Dog"	5:19
7.	"Somewhere New"	2:56
8.	"Bring It to the Front"	4:00
9.	"Back to Nothing"	4:31
10.	"Only Once"	5:00
11.	"Left Too Soon"	6:14
12.	"Adored or Bored"	4:46
13.	"Csts"	4:55
Total length:		59:57

== Personnel ==
- Ritzy Bryan – lead vocals, guitar
- Rhydian Dafydd – bass, vocals
- Matt Thomas – drums
