= Edward M. and Della C. Wilhoit House =

Historic house in Missouri, United States

- U.S. National Register of Historic Places
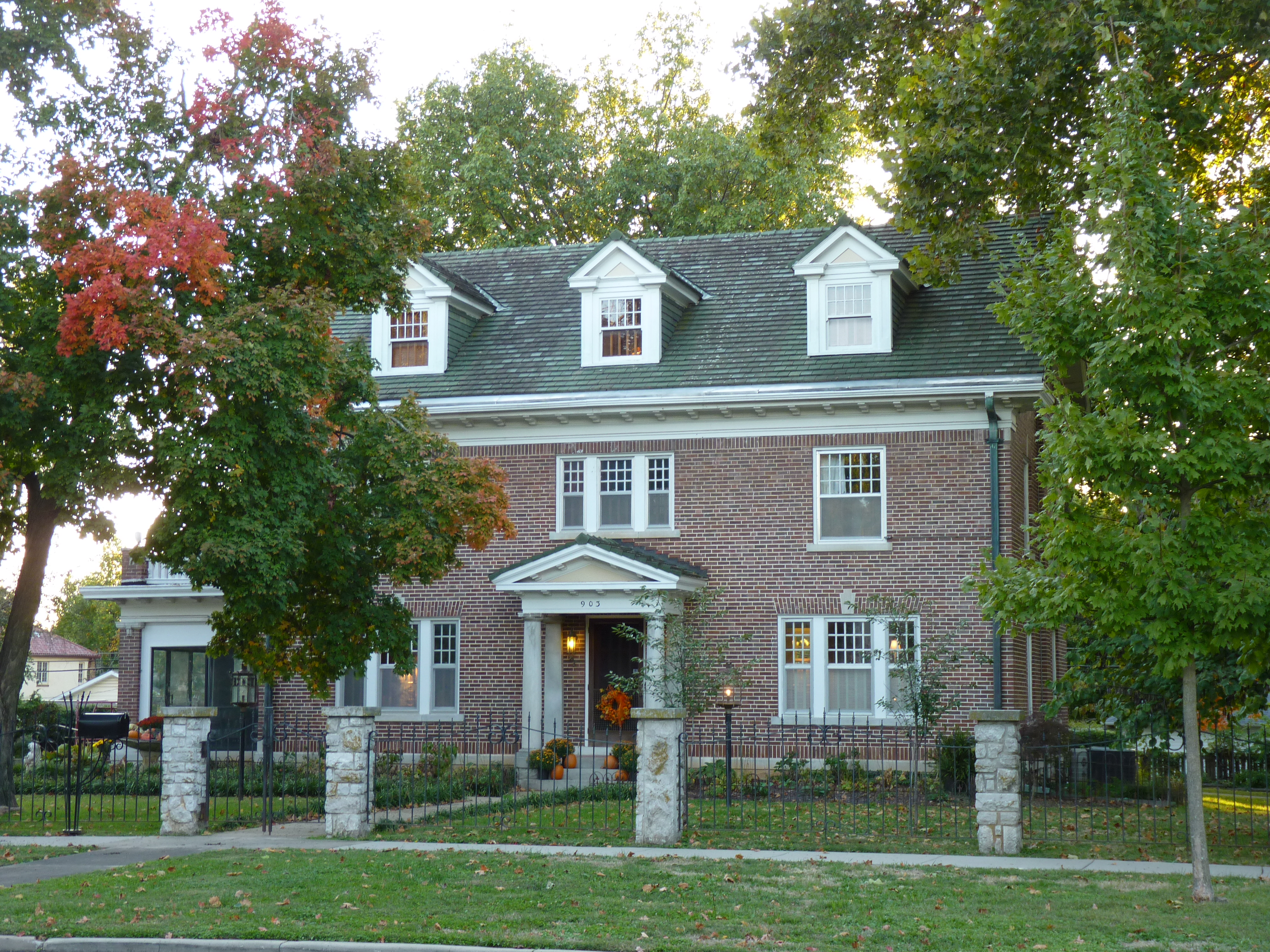
- Edward M. and Della C. Wilhoit House, October 2010

- Location within Missouri Location within the United States
- Location: 903 S. Weller Ave., Springfield, Missouri
- Coordinates: 37°12′0″N 93°16′7″W
- Area: less than one acre
- Built: 1916
- Architects: Reed, George F.
- Architectural style: Georgian Revival
- NRHP reference No.: 04001384
- Added to NRHP: December 23, 2004

Edward M. and Della C. Wilhoit House is a historic home located at Springfield, Greene County, Missouri. It was built in 1916, and is a 2 1/2-story, rectangular Georgian Revival style brick dwelling. It features a one-story gabled-roof portico with a triangular pediment supported by limestone pilasters and columns with Tuscan order capitals and a sun porch. Also on the property is he contributing one-story, three-bay brick garage. It was built by Edward M. Wilhoit, who also built the E. M. Wilhoit Building.

It was listed on the National Register of Historic Places in 2004.
