= Stepdad (band) =

American band

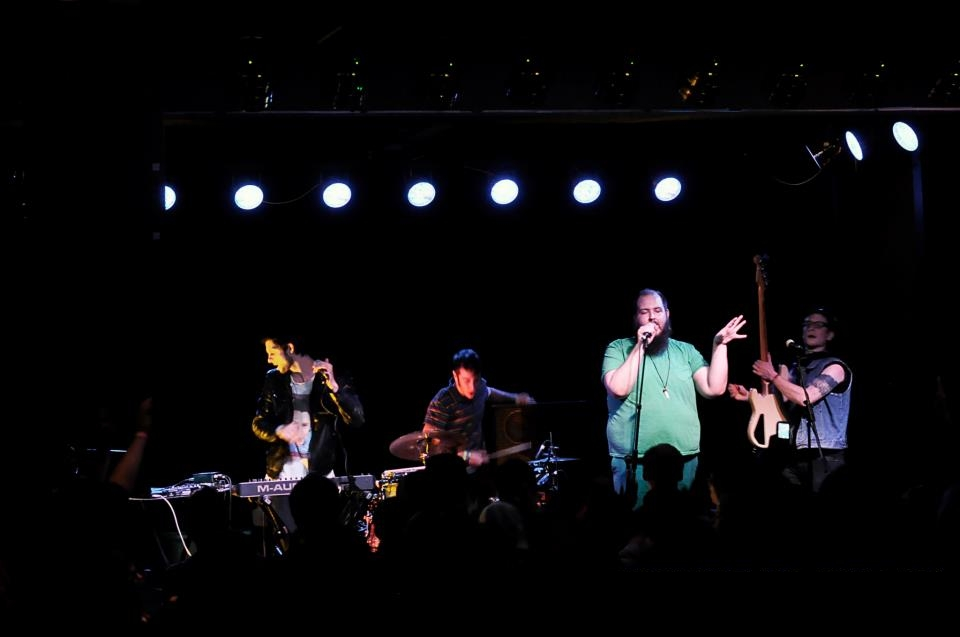
- Stepdad in 2011

Background information
- Origin: Grand Rapids, Michigan, United States
- Genres: Synthpop, electronic
- Years active: 2009–2016 (on hiatus)
- Labels: Quite Scientific; Black Bell Records; Warner Bros. Records
- Members: Mark "ultramark" Tafel; Ben Weissenborn; Nathan K.
- Past members: Jeremy Malvin; Alexander Fives; Ryan McCarthy

Stepdad is an American electronic/pop band based in Grand Rapids, Michigan.

== History ==
Originally a duo, Stepdad was formed in Chicago, Illinois during the summer of 2009 when Mark Tafel and Ryan McCarthy, who were roommates at the time, began writing songs together in their apartment. They initially gained exposure in early 2010 when they composed a theme song for the popular web comic Axe Cop. The duo's song became the official theme song for the Axe Cop comic and motion comic.

In April 2010, the band released their first EP, Ordinaire, independently via Bandcamp. The EP spawned two singles, "Jungles" and "My Leather, My Fur, My Nails".

In June 2012, Stepdad released their debut LP, Wildlife Pop, under Black Bell Records. The album was recorded with producer Chris Zane. This was followed by the EPs Strange Tonight in 2014 and Masterbeast Theatre in 2016. After releasing Masterbeast Theatre, the band went on hiatus.

In July 2026, the band announced on Facebook that Ryan McCarthy had died at the age of 38.

== Use in other media ==
- "My Leather, My Fur, My Nails" was featured in the series finale of the television show Weeds and the 2016 movie Beautiful Prison.
- "Jungles" appears in the EA Sports video game FIFA 13.
- "Warrior (Jungles pt2) was used in the rally film Easier Said Than Done.
- "Treasure Hugs" appears in the Ubisoft video game Steep.
- "Pick & Choose" and "Warrior" were featured in season 6, episode 4 of Gossip Girl.
- "Must Land Running" was featured in a national BMW TV commercial called "Moments" that began airing in December 2013.
- "Find Love" was featured in season 2, episode 14 of The Mindy Project.
- "Warrior" was featured in season 2, episode 7 of the MTV series Teen Wolf.
- "Parrot" and "Cutie Boots" have been used regularly as bump music on Adult Swim.

== Discography ==
- Ordinaire EP (2010)
- Wildlife Pop (2012)
- Strange Tonight EP (2014)
- Masterbeast Theatre EP (2016)
