= Diana Rowntree =

British architect and writer

- Born: 14 May 1915
- Died: 22 August 2008 (aged 93)
- Education: Somerville College, Oxford; Architectural Association School of Architecture
- Occupation: Architect
- Spouse: Kenneth Rowntree
- Practice: Jane Drew's firm

Diana Rowntree (14 May 1915 – 22 August 2008) was a British architect and architectural writer.

== Career and life ==
After graduating from Somerville College, Oxford and the Architectural Association School of Architecture in 1939, she joined Jane Drew's architecture practice, that at the time worked on a War Office scheme for faux factories designed to divert enemy bombers.

In the mid-1950s Rowntree took on jobs within architectural press, establishing a position as first architectural writer for The Guardian and acting as news editor for the Architectural Design magazine.

In 1964 she wrote Diana's Interior Design: A Penguin Handbook, called a pioneering work with an emphasis on minimalist rationality by The Guardian post mortem. By the mid-1960s she had resumed her own architectural practice in addition to her writing.

Her husband was painter Kenneth Rowntree, whom she married 1939.

== See also ==
- Women in architecture
