= Family of Love (EP) =

EP by Dom
- Released: August 9, 2011
- Recorded: 2011, Rare Book Room, Brooklyn, New York City
- Genre: Indie rock, synthpop
- Length: 16:22
- Label: Astralwerks
- Producer: Nicolas Vernhes

Dom chronology
Sun Bronzed Greek Gods (2010)	Family of Love (2011)

Professional ratings
Review scores
Source	Rating
Pitchfork	(8/10)
Slant Magazine	3.5/5 stars

Family of Love is the second EP by American indie pop band Dom, released on August 9, 2011 by Astralwerks.

== Track listing ==
No.	Title	Length
1.	"Telephone"	2:47
2.	"Family of Love"	4:32
3.	"Damn"	2:54
4.	"Happy Birthday Party"	3:59
5.	"Some Boys (featuring Emma)"	2:12
Total length:		16:22
