= AAARTH =

Studio album by The Joy Formidable
- Released: 28 September 2018
- Genre: Alternative rock, post-punk, alternative metal
- Length: 45:55
- Label: Seradom

The Joy Formidable chronology
Hitch (2016)	AAARTH (2018)	Into the Blue (2021)

Professional ratings
Review scores
Source	Rating
Allmusic	4.5/5 stars

AAARTH is the fourth studio album by Welsh rock band The Joy Formidable. It was released on 28 September 2018. The title references the Welsh word 'arth', which means 'bear'.

== Track listing ==
No.	Title	Length
1.	"Y Bluen Eira"	3:06
2.	"The Wrong Side"	3:35
3.	"Go Loving"	3:12
4.	"Cicada (Land on Your Back)"	3:10
5.	"All in All"	5:47
6.	"What For"	4:36
7.	"The Better Me"	3:51
8.	"Absence"	3:29
9.	"Dance of the Lotus"	4:08
10.	"You Can't Give Me"	5:14
11.	"Caught on a Breeze"	5:47
Total length:		45:55

== Charts ==
Chart (2018)	Peak position
Scottish Albums (OCC)	70
UK Albums (OCC)	93
