= I Don't Want to See You Like This =

Single by The Joy Formidable

from the album The Big Roar
- B-side: "Whirring (Instrumental Harp Version)"
- Released: 8 October 2010; 11 October 2010
- Recorded: 2009
- Genre: Alternative rock
- Length: 4:04
- Label: Atlantic Records
- Songwriter(s): The Joy Formidable
- Producer(s): The Joy Formidable

The Joy Formidable singles chronology
"Popinjay" (2010)	"I Don't Want to See You Like This" (2010)	"A Heavy Abacus" (2011)

EP Cover

"I Don't Want to See You Like This" is the second single from the Joy Formidable's debut album, The Big Roar, released by Atlantic Records on digital download and EP as well as a 7" picture disc. A music video for the song was released on 27 September 2010 and was directed by Martin Rhys Davies.

== Track listing ==
7"

1. I Don't Want to See You Like This – 4:04
2. Whirring (Instrumental Harp Version)

iTunes EP

1. I Don't Want to See You Like This – 4:04
2. While the Flies – 3:31
3. Popinjay – 3:04
4. Ostrich – 4:30

iTunes single

1. I Don't Want to See You Like This – 4:04
2. I Don't Want to See You Like This (Grouplove Remix) -3:42
3. Popinjay (live) – 3:19

== Personnel ==
- Ritzy Bryan – composer, guitar, vocals
- Rhydian Dafydd Davies – bass, composer, illustrations, vocals
- Matt Thomas – drums
