= Ricky Rountree =

The Ven Richard Benjamin Rountree B.A.

Archdeacon of Glendalough
- Incumbent
- Assumed office 2009

Personal details
- Born: 1952 (age 73–74)
- Education: National University of Ireland; Church of Ireland Theological College

Richard Benjamin (Ricky) Rountree (b 1952) is a Church of Ireland clergyman who previously served as the Archdeacon of Glendalough from 2009 until 2018.

Rountree was educated at the National University of Ireland and the Church of Ireland Theological College; and ordained in 1977. After curacies at Orangefield and Dublin he was the incumbent in Dalkey from 1983 until 1997. Since 1997, he has served at Powerscourt. He has served as the Treasurer of Christ Church Cathedral, Dublin since 2004.
