= Lovesick (album) =

Studio album by the Happy Fits
- Released: September 19, 2025
- Genre: Indie rock
- Length: 50:40

Lovesick is the fourth studio album by the Happy Fits, an American indie rock band from New Jersey. Released in 2025, it is the first album to follow significant personnel changes to the band; the band was originally a trio, until guitarist Ross Monteith announced his departure and the band added Nico Rose and Raina Mullen. Drummer Luke Davis took a break from the ongoing tour, but still recorded for the album.

Lovesick was described as a significant deviation from the band's previous work, while also incorporating much of that sound; its lyrical outlook is more pessimistic, focusing on the upsides and downsides of requited and unrequited love, and its sound is balanced between the band members rather than focusing primarily on lead singer Calvin Langman. Lovesick received praise from critics, particularly for the band's changes to its style.

== Background, production, and release ==
The Happy Fits was formed in 2016 by cellist and lead Calvin Langman with guitarist Ross Monteith; they quickly added drummer Luke Davis before recording their first extended play (EP). All three were high schoolers in New Jersey at the time. The trio recorded that EP and three albums together (Note: Awfully Apeelin' (2016); Concentrate (2018), What Could Be Better (2020), and Under the Shade of Green (2022).) over the course of six years, generally playing with joyful lyrics and a bright, enthusiastic pop-rock sound. After their third album, Monteith announced that he was leaving the Happy Fits, which significantly impacted both the fans and the band. The band added Nico Rose and Reina Mullen, while Davis took a break in the middle of tour to deal with alcoholism. His drumming does appear on the album, however; he fully returned shortly before Lovesick was privately premiered to fans in August 2025 at a concert in Bearsville Theater; Langman recounted it being difficult to premiere a fully new set of songs, saying they "ripped that band-aid off 11 times in a single night". The album was released on September 19, 2025, followed by the Lovesick Tour from September 24 to December 13; they have announced that they will tour again starting in March 2026.

== Content and analysis ==
Lovesick primarily focuses on requited and unrequited love, exploring the upsides and downsides of each. Langman describes the band's music as "a diary of my life", saying that Lovesick chronicled his experience ending a long-term relationship and then moving away. He continued: "I felt like a piece of shit for doing it, but at the same time there was freedom in knowing I was doing the right thing. That paradox is at the heart of 'The Nerve'. A lot of this record came from living with that duality."

Lovesick was described by music critics both as a significant departure from their previous work and as a partial continuation of it. Like previous albums, songs like "Do You See Me?" and "Lovesick #1 (Misery)" explore unrequited love, while songs like "Everything You Do" and "Shake Me" emulate the Happy Fits' previous pop-heavy sound with Langman's electric cello at the forefront. Other songs were a change from the Happy Fits' usual style; the replacement of Monteith with Rose and Mullen shifted the sonic balance between the members' voices, as well as their instruments. Previous Happy Fits works relied heavily on Langman's and vocals, plus the dynamic between Langman and Ross's vocals and guitar. With the introduction of Rose and Mullen, the Happy Fits became more of a four-part ensemble; Rose and Mullen's guitars figured in prominently on Lovesick and the vocal parts were split more evenly between the four members. One track, "Lovesick #1 (Misery)", heavily features Mullen's voice. The tone and focus of Lovesick also marked a departure for the Happy Fits; where previous albums typically had a bright sound and optimistic lyrics, Lovesick is more measured and weathered, although it is still energetic overall.

Unlike past Happy Fits recordings, the cover art of Lovesick does not feature a fruit, although one of the lead singles did; instead, the album cover depicts a large pair of lips floating in the sky. The cover art also includes a flower and butterflies.

All tracks are written by Langman, Davis, Rose, and Mullen, unless noted.

Lovesick track listing
No.	Title	Writer(s)	Length
1.	"Do You See Me?"		3:41
2.	"Everything You Do"		3:32
3.	"Cruel Power"		3:25
4.	"Lovesick #1 (Misery)"		3:42
5.	"The Nerve"		3:08
6.	"Miss You"		3:23
7.	"I Could Stare at You for Hours"		3:09
8.	"Sarah's Song"	Langman	3:03
9.	"Shake Me"		3:02
10.	"I Still Think I Love You"		3:21
11.	"Wild in Love"		2:48
12.	"Black Hole"		2:43
13.	"Superior"	Langman	3:25
14.	"Wrong About Me"	Langman	2:31
15.	"I Remember"		5:40
Total length:			50:40

== Reception ==
Lovesick received generally positive reviews from critics, especially for its departures from its previous sound. Raniel Santos of Earmilk said that the album "works better than it should", praising its lyrics and production. Max Gayler of The Line of Best Fit said that the band was "more collaborative, more self-aware, and more alive than ever". Emily McCormack of Melodic called their new sound "refreshing" and "innovative". Jim Testa of njarts.net praised the band for not relying on old formulas, with the caveat that "the momentum (and indeed, the fun) on this album feels front-loaded". "Lovesick #1 (Misery)" received particular praise – Raniel Santos said that "the band blows the roof off", while Emily McCormack said that she kept thinking back to Mullen's vocal performance throughout the rest of the album.
