= This Ladder Is Ours =

Single by The Joy Formidable

from the album Wolf's Law
- Released: 9 October 2012
- Recorded: 2012
- Genre: Alternative rock, shoegazing
- Length: 5:11
- Label: Atlantic
- Songwriter(s): The Joy Formidable
- Producer(s): The Joy Formidable

The Joy Formidable singles chronology
"A Heavy Abacus" (2011)	"This Ladder Is Ours" (2012)	"Cholla" (2012)

"This Ladder Is Ours" is a song by the Welsh alternative rock band the Joy Formidable, taken from the group's second album, Wolf's Law.

== Music video ==
An official music video for the song, directed by Greg Jardin, was released on 8 November 2012. Commenting on the concept of the video, Jardin stated, "I wanted the video to essentially be just like the song and band itself – aggressive but also ethereal. That notion, and the band’s recurring visual theme of the wilderness, inspired the idea of the band performing in some sort of elemental battle between man and nature; and thus, the idea for the dust storm was conceived."

== Track listings ==
- Digital download
1. This Ladder Is Ours - 5:11
2. Cholla - 3:24

== Charts ==
Chart (2012)	Peak position
US Alternative Songs (Billboard)	24
