= Roundtree =

Roundtree is a surname, a variant of Rountree. Still another variant is Rowntree. Notable people with the name include:

- Dovey Johnson Roundtree (1914–2018), American civil rights activist, minister, and attorney
- Raleigh Roundtree (born 1975), American football player
- Ray Roundtree (born 1966), American football player
- Richard Roundtree (1942–2023), American actor, best known for Shaft
- Roy Roundtree (born 1989), American football coach and former player
- Saudia Roundtree (born 1976), American basketball coach and former player
- Shay Roundtree (born 1977), American actor
