= LaSalle Hotel (Bryan, Texas) =

- U.S. National Register of Historic Places
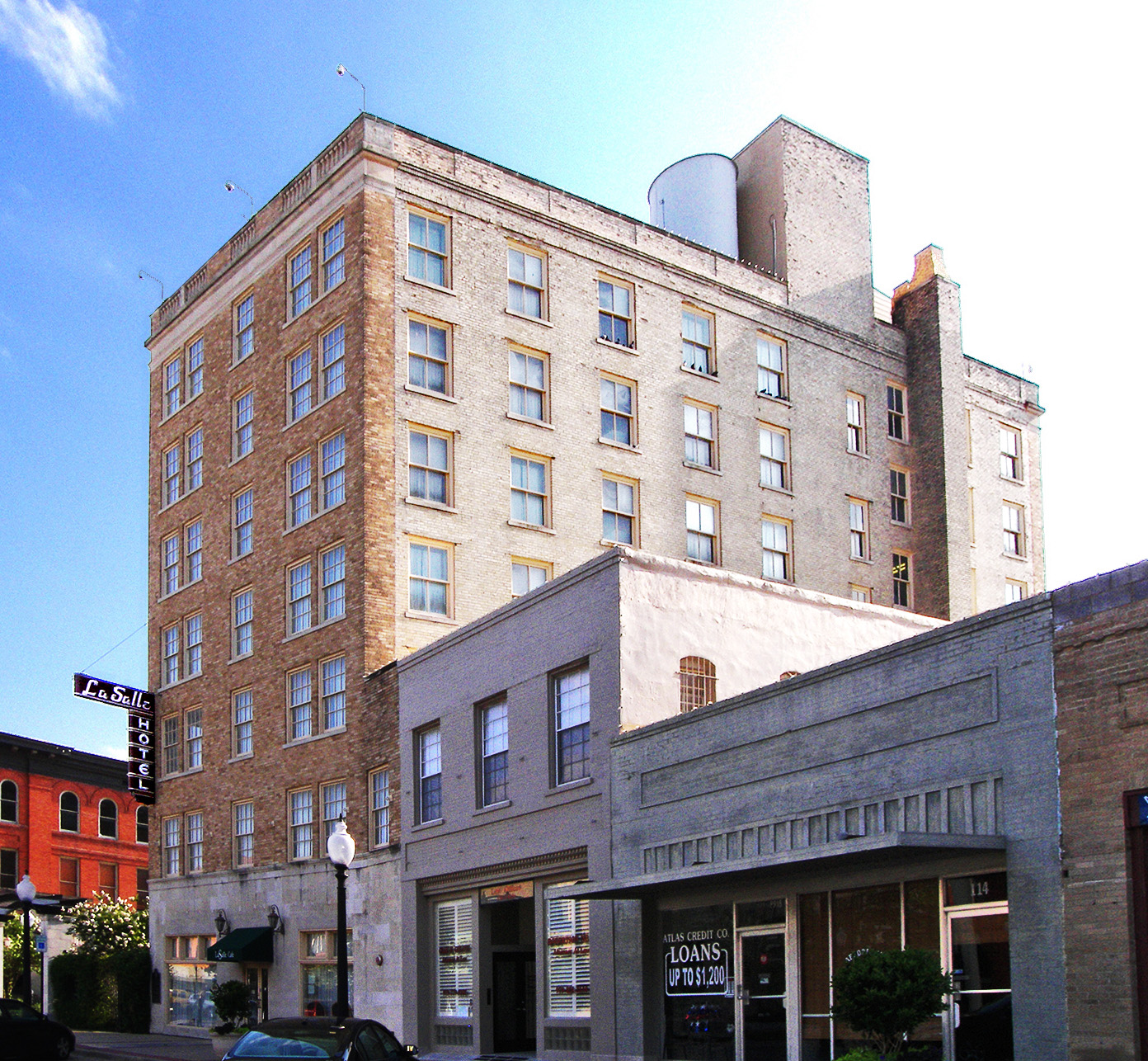
- The LaSalle Hotel in 2009.

- Location within Texas Location within the United States
- Location: 120 S Main St; Bryan, Texas
- Coordinates: 30°40′23″N 96°22′25″W
- Built: 1928
- NRHP reference No.: 00000555
- Added to NRHP: May 26, 2000

The LaSalle Hotel is a hotel located in downtown Bryan, Texas, United States, a Texas cultural district. (Note: Though the LaSalle's name is often see written as La Salle, including in the National Registry documents, the official name used by the hotel is written as one word.) The hotel was opened in 1928 and was added to the National Register of Historic Places on May 26, 2000.

At its opening in 1928, the seven-story hotel was the tallest building in Bryan. The LaSalle had one hundred guest rooms, a ballroom and meeting space (both have since been converted to guest rooms). Several businesses, including a tailor, a barber and a cafe were located on the first floor. Businessman and city leader R. W. Howell built the hotel and the Howell family owned the hotel for over thirty years. J. C. Jacques bought the property in 1959 and converted it into a nursing home. The home was open until 1975 and then became a resident hotel with small apartments until it closed in 1980. The LaSalle sat empty for seventeen years when a private developer with city backing began renovations. The hotel reopened in 2000, which started the revitalization of downtown Bryan. The hotel faltered though and the City of Bryan stepped in to keep it open.

The LaSalle currently has 55 rooms and suites and has been newly renovated into what it is now known as the LaSalle Hotel, a Tribute Portfolio Hotel by Marriott.
