= A Balloon Called Moaning =

2008 EP by the Joy Formidable

EP by The Joy Formidable
- Released: 17 December 2008
- Genre: Alternative rock, indie rock, shoegaze, dream pop
- Length: 29:18
- Label: Pure Groove (UK); Black Bell (US); Rallye (Japan)

The Joy Formidable chronology
A Balloon Called Moaning (2008)	The Big Roar (2011)

Singles from A Balloon Called Moaning
- 1. "Austere" Released: 10 January 2008; 2. "Cradle" Released: 2 February 2009; 3. "Whirring" Released: May 2009

A Balloon Called Moaning is the debut extended play by Welsh indie rock band the Joy Formidable. It was released exclusively in Japan in December 2008, then released with additional tracks in the UK the following month.

== Critical reception ==
The album was reviewed by NME, which rated it 8 out of 10, and by Pitchfork, which rated it 6.7 out of 10.

== Track listing ==
All music is composed by The Joy Formidable.

No.	Title	Length
1.	"The Greatest Light Is the Greatest Shade"	5:20
2.	"Cradle"	2:47
3.	"Austere"	3:05
4.	"While the Flies"	3:41
5.	"Whirring"	3:34
6.	"9669"	2:49
7.	"The Last Drop"	3:25
8.	"Ostrich"	4:37

Japanese edition
No.	Title	Length
1.	"The Greatest Light Is the Greatest Shade"	5:20
2.	"Cradle"	2:47
3.	"Austere"	3:05
4.	"While the Flies"	3:41
5.	"Whirring"	3:34
6.	"Cradle (Kyte Remix)"	3:24
7.	"The Last Drop (Totally Enormous Extinct Dinosaurs - Iguanodon Mix)"	6:18
