= DOM (band) =

American music project by Dominic Hus

DoM
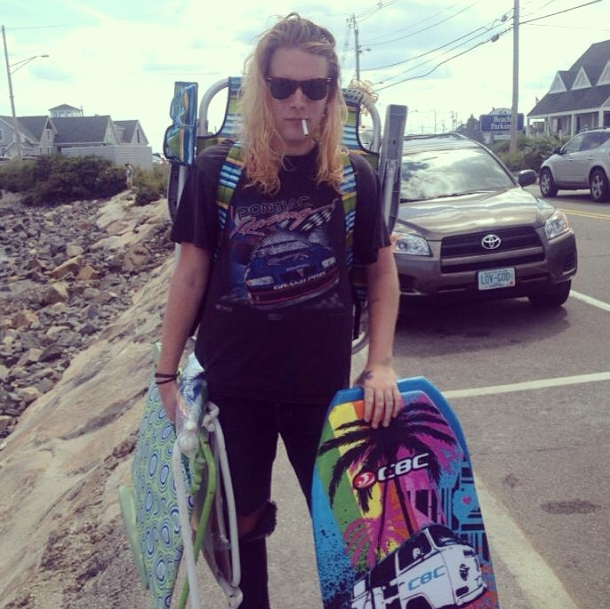

Background information
- Origin: Worcester, Massachusetts, US
- Genres: Indie rock, psychedelic pop, synthpop, lo-fi, electronic
- Years active: 2009–present
- Labels: Modular Recordings, Parlophone, Astralwerks, Black Bell Records Burning Mill Records
- Members: Dominic Cournoyer
- Past members: Bobby Kelley; Cosmo DiGiulio; John Mingsley; Kenny Brown; Erik Gonzalez

DoM is an American pop / electronic solo musical project by Dominic Cournoyer originating from Worcester, Massachusetts. With warped vocals, fuzzy lo-fi distortion, and broken Casio keyboard lines, Dom filters a DIY aesthetic through the upbeat, sunny rhythms of pop music.

== Career ==
DoM's debut, Sun Bronzed Greek Gods (EP), was released in March 2010, and received critical acclaim. It was picked up by Capitol Records/Astralwerks (US), Parlophone Records (UK), and Modular Records (AU).

DoM was asked to open for Ratatat on his first North-American tour. At the 2010 Boston Music Awards, DoM led in nominations including Artist of the Year, Song of the Year, Album of the Year and Best New Artist, taking home Song of The Year for "Living in America". The Rapper Gucci Mane later remixed the track. The Sun Bronzed Greek Gods EP also made many best of 2010 lists, including Pitchfork Media's Staff Picks: Best Albums of 2010 and Spin's 20 Best Songs of Summer.

In August 2011, DoM released his Family of Love EP. Co-produced by Nicolas Vernhes (Animal Collective, Björk), the EP was featured in Rolling Stone for making the Top 10 College Radio chart September 2011. DoM was again nominated at the Boston Music Awards 2011 for Song of The Year. After playing Lollapalooza 2011, DoM was asked by festival founder Perry Farrell to open for Jane's Addiction.

On Halloween in 2013, DoM released his debut electronic LP, Hyperfantasy XL, via his producer alias, Kiss 1o8, in New York City with support from Unicorn Kid, Com Truise and Pictureplane.

On February 10, 2014 DoM posted that he was collaborating with Mark Hoppus of Blink 182 and writing new material for a future Dom/Kiss1o8 release.

== Discography ==
=== EPs ===
- Sun Bronzed Greek Gods (2010)
- Family of Love (2011)

=== Albums ===
- Hyperfantasy XL (2012) (as Kiss 1o8)

=== Singles ===
- Living in America (2010)
- Bowl Cut (featuring Madeline of Cults) (2011)
- Gud Tymes (2017)
- History (2018)
- Love (2022)
- Vanilla (2022)
