= Kenneth Rowntree =

British artist (1915–1997)

- Born: 14 March 1915; Scarborough, Yorkshire, England
- Died: 21 February 1997 (aged 81); Hexham, Northumberland, England
- Occupation(s): Artist, teacher
- Notable work: Festival of Britain Freedom Mural
- Spouse: Diana Rowntree

Kenneth Rowntree (14 March 1915 – 21 February 1997) was an English artist.

== Career and life ==
Kenneth Rowntree was born in Scarborough, the son of Howard Doncaster Rowntree (1879-1974). He was educated at Bootham School, York.

He studied at the Ruskin School of Art, Oxford and went on to the Slade School of Fine Art. At the Slade he met Eric Ravilious and Edward Bawden, moving to north Essex to work more closely with them. They became known – with others – as the Great Bardfield Artists.

In 1939, he married architect Diana Rowntree (née Buckley) with whom he had two children.

During the Second World War, he worked for the War Artists' Advisory Committee. He was one of more than 60 artists commissioned by the Government and financed by the Pilgrim Trust to record the face of England and Wales before development or wartime destruction changed it. Recording Britain, as this project came to be known, covered a total of 36 counties. Kenneth Rowntree concentrated on capturing the essential character of old buildings and interiors in Bedfordshire, Essex, Yorkshire, Derbyshire and Wales.

After the war he joined the Royal College of Art as head of its mural painting studios.

In 1948, Penguin published A Prospect of Wales, including 40 of his illustrations.

In 1951, he completed a major mural, Freedom, for The Lion and the Unicorn Pavilion at the Festival of Britain.

In 1953, he painted scenes along the processional route of the Coronation, with the Queen later acquiring some of his works.

In 1959, he was appointed to succeed Lawrence Gowing as Professor of Fine Art at Newcastle University; it was one of the most progressive art schools in Britain, where the teaching staff included Victor Pasmore and Richard Hamilton. He held this post until his retirement in 1980.

It was at Newcastle that he became receptive to various modernist idioms, such as assemblage and constructivist forms, and incorporated them in his own work. Amongst many other achievements, Kenneth Rowntree worked with the architect Ernő Goldfinger to produce coloured glass panels in Goldfinger's Alexander Fleming House (now Metro Central Heights) in the Elephant and Castle.

Kenneth Rowntree died in Hexham on 21 February 1997.
