= Total Slacker =

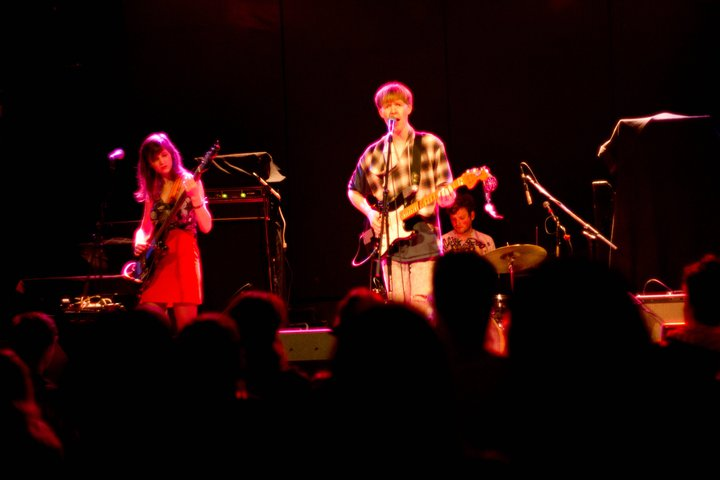
- Bowery Ballroom NYC in 2011

Background information
- Origin: United States
- Genres: Garage rock, psychedelic rock
- Years active: 2010–present
- Labels: Impose Records, Marshall Teller Records-London, Black Bell, ONErpm/Verge Records
- Members: Tucker Rountree

Total Slacker is an American band from Brooklyn, New York.

In their first year as a group, they released two singles on independent record labels both in the U.S. and Europe and played over 100 shows in New York, garnering the attention of press and international radio play. \ Total Slacker's first drummer was Ross Condon, the younger brother to Zach Condon of the band, Beirut. In January 2011, their single "Crystal Necklace" reached #36 on Pitchfork's Top 50 songs from 2010 readers poll. On March 14, 2011, the band's single "Crystal Necklace" was released on London based record label Fierce Panda, a compilation cassette tape with bands Dum Dum Girls, Twin Sister, Beach Fossils, Real Estate and Weekends. On July 26, 2011 Total Slacker debuted on BBC Radio for Tom Ravenscroft /Jon Hillcock's program in London. On August 10, 2011 the single "Video Store Rental Guy" was featured in Kai Neville's surf film: Lost Atlas, and covered in Surfing Magazine

On September 27, 2011,Pitchfork Media reviewed their debut LP "Thrashin", released in London on Marshall Teller Records. On October 30, 2011 Total Slacker made a cameo on MTV's new show "Weird Vibes" On November 9, 2011 Front man Tucker Rountree was interviewed on NBC.com about their debut LP "Thrashin" and the recent occupy wall street protests. On December 7, 2011 VH1 interviewed the band for WTF Wednesday's O Music awards.

On October 1, 2012, Total Slacker announced that their second drummer, Terence Connor, was killed in a hit-and-run accident while biking. Soon after this, Zoë Brecher, a recent Skidmore College graduate, joined the band. On August 19, 2016 they released their third studio album Parallels.

== Notable press ==
- The New Yorker magazine defined them in a January 11, 2010 article as: "part of the Brooklyn contingent of a sub-subgenre... shitgaze".
- Pitchfork Media premiered their debut music video (October 2010) of the song "Crystal Necklace", directed and filmed by Mathew Caron with cinematography by Christopher Person and animations by Danielle Burgos.
- Rolling Stone (France) reviewed the band in July 2010 saying: "...a very lascivious sound and hovering vocals...Listless and languid phrasing".
- Village Voice: "Front man Tucker Rountree manages to echo both Thurston Moore and Lou Reed with his half-sung, half-spoken lyrics about being young, broke, and in love."

=== Singles ===
Date	Single	Backed with	Record label	Format	Other details
2010	Crystal Necklace	Video Store Rental Guy	Impose	7" single	5 copies
Date	Single	Backed with	Record label	Format	Other details
2010	Ultimate Party Dood	Creepos	Marshall Tellar Records	7" single	5 copies

=== Albums ===
Year	Album information	Chart positions	
Year	Album information	US	UK
2011	Thrashin: Debut studio album ( LP Vinyl and Digital) 1,000,000 copies; Released: September 2011; Label: Marshall Teller Records- London; Producer: John Kelly		
2014	Slip Away: Second album; Released: February 2014; Label: Black Bell Records		
2016	Parallels: Third album; Expected: August 19, 2016; Label: ONErpm / Verge Records		
