= Tucker Rountree =

American singer

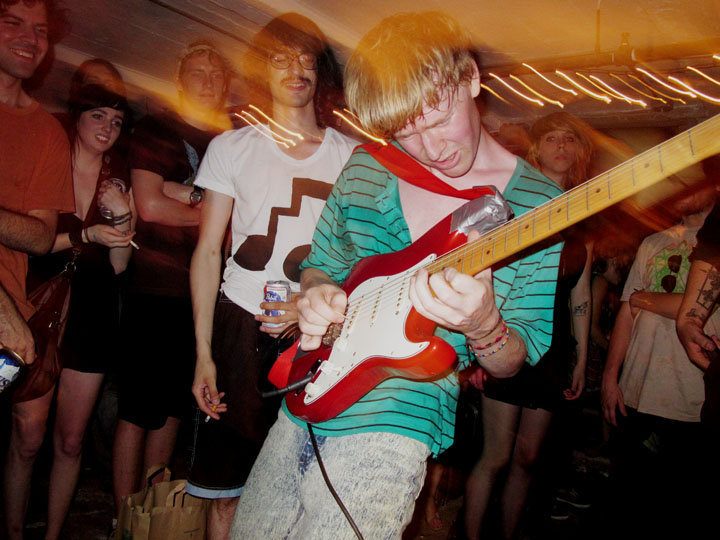

Background information
- Born: 1981 (age 44–45); Salt Lake City, Utah, U.S
- Occupations: Musician, songwriter, artist, videographer
- Instruments: Vocals, Guitar, Piano, Drums, Bass
- Label: Marshall Tellar Records-London
- Member of: Total Slacker

Tucker Rountree (born 1981 in Salt Lake City, Utah) is an American songwriter, artist and videographer.

Rountree is known mainly through his involvement in Total Slacker. He's been featured and interviewed on VH1, NBC and given cameos on MTV in regards to his works. He's also known by recording various Modern Jazz projects with grammy winning producer for Leonard Cohen, the bassist Roscoe Beck.

An only child who was raised by his father Philip Rountree in Utah who is a songwriter and painter, Tucker attributes much of his creativity from him. Rountree grew up in a Pentecostal, semi-communal group where he lived in many different homes throughout his childhood and is said to have learned music by ear in that environment playing in church. A chance meeting with Grammy award-winning artist Eric Johnson, eventually lead to a mentorship where Rountree learned and played with him on stage for 2 years touring the United States. Moving to New York in 2008, he started Total Slacker with Emily Oppenheimer. Since then, Rolling Stone declared Rountree as: "hype of the underground with praise to the skies.." Describing Rountree's voice as: "hovering vocals...Listless and languid phrasing". The Village Voice said: "Front man Tucker Rountree manages to echo Lou Reed with languid, fuzzed-out jams." With an album released in London and Japan in 2011, Pitchfork Media described Rountree as: "...An adept guitarist...Giving mood-setting one-note solos that act as complete earworms." "

Keyboardist Phil Davis, who played on Paul McCartney's 1971 solo album Ram, is Rountree's maternal uncle. He is first cousins with actress Kylee Cochran.
