= The Big Roar =

2011 studio album by the Joy Formidable

Studio album by The Joy Formidable
- Released: 24 January 2011
- Genres: Alternative rock; indie rock; shoegazing
- Length: 49:53
- Label: Atlantic
- Producers: The Joy Formidable, Rich Costey, Neak Menter

The Joy Formidable chronology
A Balloon Called Moaning (2008)	The Big Roar (2011)	Roarities (2011)

Singles from The Big Roar
- 1. "Popinjay" Released: 5 April 2010; 2. "I Don't Want To See You Like This" Released: 8 October 2010; 3. "A Heavy Abacus" Released: 8 July 2011

The Big Roar is the debut album by Welsh rock band the Joy Formidable, released in the UK on 24 January 2011 on Atlantic Records, with a US release following on 15 March 2011. The tracks "Austere", "Cradle", "Whirring" and "The Greatest Light Is the Greatest Shade" were originally featured on the band's debut mini album A Balloon Called Moaning. These songs were re-recorded for The Big Roar.

== Background and recording ==
In summer 2010, the band signed with Canvasback Records, a subsidiary of Atlantic. The band worked on writing and tracking the material for The Big Roar when they were not on tour. The album was recorded in London.

On the album, bassist Rhydian Dafydd said that "(it) covers a lot of emotional range. It's captured the battle between the eternal optimist and the manic depressive". Their debut was produced by the band, with help from engineer Neak Menter. The band traveled to Los Angeles to mix it with producer Rich Costey, who had worked with bands such as Mew, Muse, Foo Fighters and Glasvegas. The first single from those sessions, "I Don't Want to See You Like This", was released in the autumn of 2010. The Japanese release of the album contains three exclusive bonus tracks.

== Critical reception ==
Professional ratings
Review scores
Source	Rating
AbsolutePunk	(84%) link
Allmusic	link
Contactmusic	link
BBC Music	(very positive) link
Drowned in Sound	link
NME	8/10 link
Clash	link
The Guardian	link
Pitchfork	6.8/10 link
Spin	8/10 link

The Big Roar has received mostly positive reviews. The album currently has a 77 out of 100 on the review aggregate site Metacritic, which indicates "generally favorable reviews".

Reviewer Mike Haydock of BBC Music praised the album, calling it "a fantastic debut". Lisa Wright of NME also gave the album a positive review, writing, "The Big Roar is the kind of epic-yet-intimate debut that does exactly what its title makes out in the most tactful of styles; an LP that ultimately delivers on every count on the four years of promise leading up to it". In another positive review, Clash wrote of the album: "Bolt on an undeniably zealous execution, a set of simple yet well-written songs, add an element of confident adventure via some experimentation and diversity and the rebirth of indie may just have found its leading protagonists".

In a more mixed review, Stuart Berman of Pitchfork criticized the album for being excessive, writing, "There's no denying the Joy Formidable's passion, vigor, and pop smarts; it would just be easier to appreciate those qualities if The Big Roar didn't so often sound like a big blur". Jason Keller of Now Magazine agreed, writing, "The immediate criticism about this long-in-the-making debut... is that there's too much big, as the title suggests".

== Track listing ==
No.	Title	Writer(s)	Producer(s)	Length
1.	"The Everchanging Spectrum of a Lie"	Rhydian Davies, Ritzy Bryan	The Joy Formidable, Neak Menter	7:44
2.	"The Magnifying Glass"	Davies, Bryan	The Joy Formidable, Neak Menter	2:19
3.	"I Don't Want to See You Like This"	Davies, Bryan	The Joy Formidable, Neak Menter	4:18
4.	"Austere"	Davies, Bryan	The Joy Formidable, Neak Menter	3:30
5.	"A Heavy Abacus"	Davies, Bryan	The Joy Formidable, Neak Menter	3:40
6.	"Whirring"	Davies, Bryan	Rich Costey	6:47
7.	"Buoy"	Davies, Bryan	The Joy Formidable, Neak Menter	4:51
8.	"Maruyama"	Davies, Bryan	The Joy Formidable, Neak Menter	1:46
9.	"Cradle"	Davies, Bryan	Rich Costey	2:46
10.	"Llaw = Wall"	Davies, Bryan	The Joy Formidable, Neak Menter	3:44
11.	"Chapter 2"	Davies, Bryan	The Joy Formidable, Neak Menter	3:08
12.	"The Greatest Light Is the Greatest Shade"	Davies, Bryan	The Joy Formidable, Neak Menter	5:20

Japanese edition bonus tracks
No.	Title	Writer(s)	Producer(s)	Length
13.	"My Beerdrunk Soul Is Sadder Than a Hundred Christmas Trees"	Davies, Bryan	The Joy Formidable	4:56
14.	"Popinjay"	Davies, Bryan	The Joy Formidable, Neak Menter	3:15
15.	"Chwyrlio"	Davies, Bryan	The Joy Formidable	4:12

Limited edition bonus CD: It's Just a World Apart
No.	Title	Writer(s)	Producer(s)	Length
1.	"Greyhounds In the Slips" (featuring Paul Draper)	Davies, Bryan	The Joy Formidable	3:25
2.	"My Beerdrunk Soul Is Sadder Than a Hundred Christmas Trees"	Davies, Bryan	The Joy Formidable	4:56
3.	"Popinjay"	Davies, Bryan	The Joy Formidable, Neak Menter	3:15
4.	"Chwyrlio"	Davies, Bryan	The Joy Formidable	4:12
5.	"The Butterfly's Last Spell"	Davies, Bryan	The Joy Formidable	3:21
6.	"Wide Eyed"	Davies, Bryan	The Joy Formidable	2:43

Limited edition bonus DVD: One Shape Under the Magnifying Glass: Live at the Mercury Lounge
No.	Title	Writer(s)	Producer(s)	Length
1.	"The Greatest Light Is the Greatest Shade"	Davies, Bryan	John Ashby
2.	"Cradle"	Davies, Bryan	Ashby
3.	"The Last Drop"	Davies, Bryan	Ashby
4.	"Austere"	Davies, Bryan	Ashby
5.	"Ostrich"	Davies, Bryan	Ashby
6.	"Greyhound In the Slips"	Davies, Bryan	Ashby

Limited edition bonus DVD: A Bridge Splits November's Sky
No.	Title	Length
1.	"To Worms Head" (includes "My Beerdrunk Soul Is Sadder Than a Hundred Christmas Trees", "The Magnifying Glass", "Whirring", "I Don't Want to See You Like This", "Austere", "The Everchanging Spectrum of a Lie")
2.	"Austere" (music video)
3.	"Cradle" (music video)
4.	"Whirring" (music video)
5.	"Popinjay" (music video)
6.	"I Don't Want to See You Like This" (music video)

== Personnel ==
The Joy Formidable

- Ritzy Bryan – Vocals, guitar
- Rhydian Dafydd – Bass, vocals (10)
- Matt Thomas – Drums

Production

- Rich Costey – Mixing, producer
- Neak Menter – Mixing, producer

Design personnel

- Rhydian Dafydd - Illustrations
- Jeremy Cowart – Photography
- Danny North – Photography
- Alex Kirzhner – Layout

== Charts ==
Chart (2011)	Peak position
Billboard Heatseekers Albums	8
UK Albums Chart	31
