= Austere (song) =

- 2009 cover

Single by The Joy Formidable

from the EP A Balloon Called Moaning and the album The Big Roar
- Released: 18 August 2008; 10 January 2011
- Recorded: 2008
- Genre: Alternative rock, shoegazing
- Length: 3:15
- Label: Atlantic Records, Another Music=Another Kitchen
- Songwriter(s): The Joy Formidable
- Producer(s): The Joy Formidable

The Joy Formidable singles chronology
"Austere" (2008)	"Cradle" (2009)

"Austere" is the debut single by Welsh alternative rock band The Joy Formidable. It was originally released in August 2008 on 7" vinyl on the Another Music=Another Kitchen label. The song and band gained much exposure when YouTube removed a fan-made music video. An official video was put together featuring the band playing pass the parcel. The single was re-released for their debut album The Big Roar and a new video was made, featuring the band performing the song.

In a short review of the track The Times described it as "dreamy indie pop", and the track appeared in trailers for SSX (2012 video game) as well as Channel 4's Skins.

== Track listing ==
Original

1. Austere

Re-release

1. Austere
2. Austere (Oh Matt Thomas Bamalam Remix)

== Personnel ==
2009 version

- Ritzy Bryan - Vocals, Guitar
- Rhydian Dafydd - Bass
- Justin Stahley - Drums

2011 version

- Ritzy Bryan - Vocals, Guitar
- Rhydian Dafydd - Bass
- Matt Thomas - Drums
