= Hitch (album) =

Studio album by The Joy Formidable
- Released: 25 March 2016
- Recorded: Wales
- Genres: Alternative rock, shoegazing, dream pop
- Length: 66:02
- Labels: C'mon Let's Drift (UK), Caroline (US)
- Producer: The Joy Formidable

The Joy Formidable chronology
Wolf's Law (2013)	Hitch (2016)	AAARTH (2018)

Singles from Hitch
- 1. "The Last Thing on My Mind" Released: 26 January 2016

Professional ratings
Review scores
Source	Rating
AllMusic	3.5/5 stars
The Guardian	3/5 stars

Hitch is the third studio album by the Welsh alternative rock band the Joy Formidable. The album was released on 25 March 2016 by the C'mon Let's Drift label in the UK, and Caroline Records in the US.

== Background and recording ==
In comparison to the band's prior album, Wolf's Law, which was mainly written on the road while touring, Hitch was recorded in lead singer Ritzy Bryan's old family home, outside Mold in Wales.

== Release and promotion ==
A music video for the single "The Last Thing on My Mind" was released on 26 January 2016.

On 22 March 2016, the band previewed a stream of the entire album on their SoundCloud page.

== Track listing ==
No.	Title	Length
1.	"A Second in White"	3:56
2.	"Radio of Lips"	6:23
3.	"The Last Thing on My Mind"	6:20
4.	"Liana"	5:42
5.	"The Brook"	5:50
6.	"It's Started"	5:06
7.	"The Gift"	3:20
8.	"Running Hands with the Night"	6:56
9.	"Fog (Black Windows)"	4:45
10.	"Underneath the Petal"	5:45
11.	"Blowing Fire"	4:22
12.	"Don't Let Me Know"	7:37

Web store exclusive digital bonus track
No.	Title	Length
13.	"Passerby"	6:42

== Charts ==
Chart	Peak position
Billboard Alternative Albums	15
Billboard Independent Albums	14
Billboard Rock Albums	22
UK Indie Albums Chart	12
