= A Heavy Abacus =

Single by The Joy Formidable

from the album The Big Roar
- Released: 8 July 2011
- Recorded: 2009
- Genre: Alternative rock, shoegazing
- Length: 3:40
- Label: Atlantic Records
- Songwriter: The Joy Formidable
- Producer: The Joy Formidable

The Joy Formidable singles chronology
| "I Don't Want to See You Like This" (2010) | "A Heavy Abacus" (2011) | "This Ladder Is Ours" (2012) |

"A Heavy Abacus" is the third and final single from Welsh alternative rock band The Joy Formidable's debut album The Big Roar, released in July 2011. A music video for "A Heavy Abacus" was directed by Christopher Mills. The song charted at number 25 on the Billboard Alternative Songs, and stayed on chart for fifteen weeks.

== Track listing ==
- Digital download
1. A Heavy Abacus – 3:40

== Personnel ==
- Ritzy Bryan – composer, guitar, vocals
- Rhydian Dafydd Davies – bass, composer, illustrations, vocals
- Matt Thomas – drums

== Charts ==
| Chart (2011) | Peak position |
|---|---|
| US Alternative Songs (Billboard) | 25 |
