= The Joy Formidable =

Welsh rock band

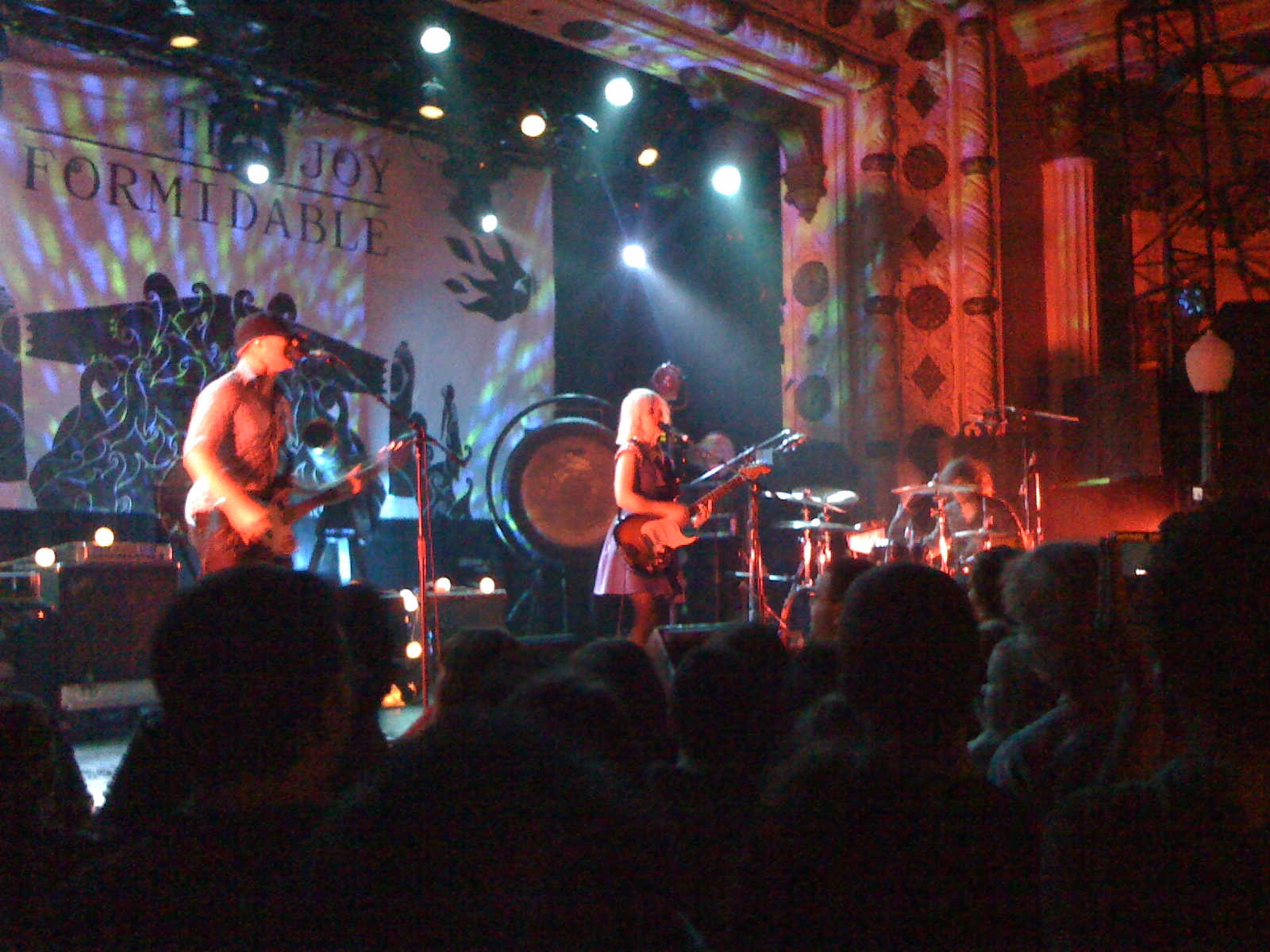
- The Joy Formidable, performing at Metro in Chicago on 14 December 2011. Left to right: Rhydian Dafydd, Ritzy Bryan, Matt Thomas.

Background information
- Origin: Mold, Flintshire, Wales
- Genres: Alternative rock, dream pop, shoegazing, indie rock, post-punk
- Years active: 2007–present
- Labels: Canvasback Music, Atlantic Records, Warner Music Group, Black Bell Records
- Members: Rhiannon "Ritzy" Bryan; Rhydian Dafydd Davies
- Past members: Justin Stahley; Matt Thomas
- Website: www.thejoyformidable.com

The Joy Formidable are a Welsh alternative rock band, formed in 2007 in Mold, Flintshire, and currently based in London, England. The band consists of Rhiannon "Ritzy" Bryan (lead vocals, guitar) and Rhydian Dafydd (bass, vocals). The album, Into the Blue, was released in 2021.

== History ==
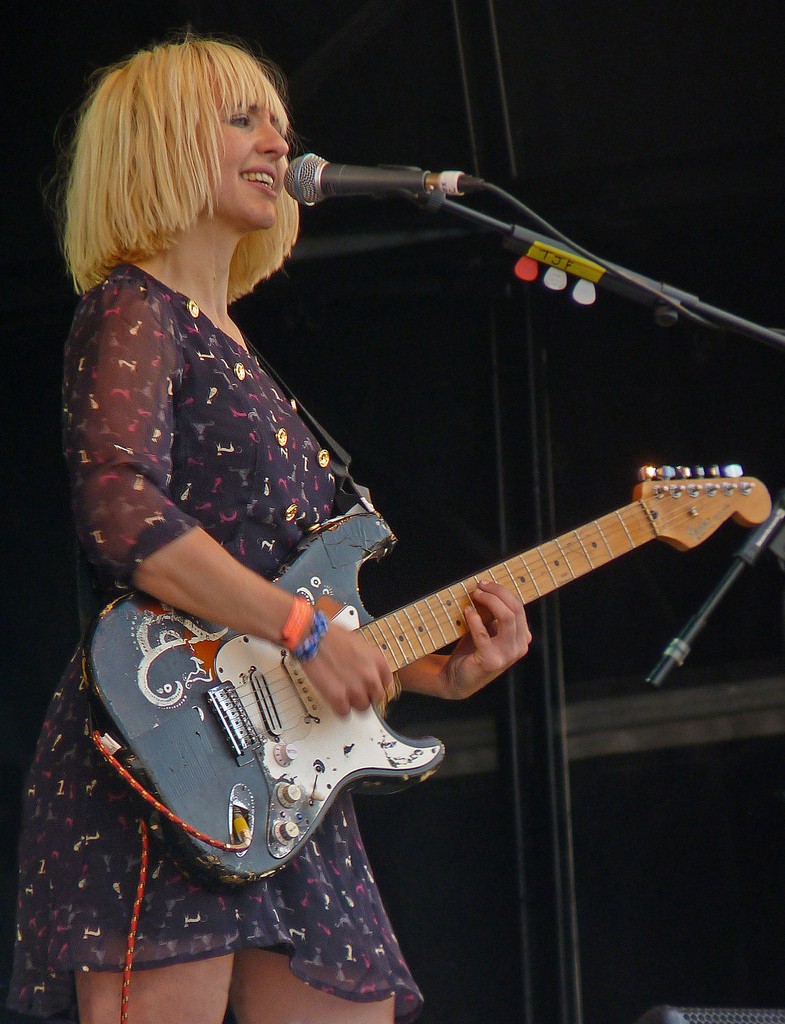
Ritzy Bryan performing at Glastonbury Festival in 2010.

=== Early career ===
Childhood friends and then couple Ritzy Bryan and bassist Rhydian Dafydd originally played together as part of Manchester band Tricky Nixon, which later reformed into Sidecar Kisses. After Sidecar Kisses split up in 2007, they regrouped, returning to their Welsh home town of Mold, and formed the Joy Formidable with Justin Stahley on drums. In July 2008, they released their first official single, "Austere". It was followed by a Christmas single, "My Beerdrunk Soul Is Sadder than a Hundred Dead Christmas Trees", issued as a 2008 digital download, and the "Cradle" double 7" in 2009. The band's debut EP A Balloon Called Moaning was released exclusively in Japan on 17 December 2008, followed by a UK release in March 2009.

In 2009, Stahley was replaced with Matt Thomas. That April, they teamed with a new label started by Passion Pit's Ayad Al Adhamy, Black Bell Records, to release A Balloon Called Moaning in the U.S., earning favourable reviews from NME, The Guardian, The Times, Spin and Pitchfork.

=== 2010–2020 ===
In 2010, the band signed to Canvasback Records, a subsidiary of Atlantic, and began work on their debut album, The Big Roar, which was recorded in London. Dafydd said that "(it) covers a lot of emotional range. It's captured the battle between the eternal optimist and the manic depressive". The album was produced by the Joy Formidable with help from engineer Neak Menter. The band traveled to Los Angeles to mix it with producer Rich Costey, who had worked with bands such as Mew, Muse, Foo Fighters and Glasvegas.

The Big Roar was released on 24 January 2011 and included early singles "Austere", "Cradle" and "Whirring" as well as two further singles, "I Don't Want to See You Like This" and "A Heavy Abacus" ("Whirring" was later sampled by the Lonely Island on "YOLO"). In July 2011, they released an EP through their website entitled Roarities. In November 2011, their song "Endtapes" was featured on The Twilight Saga: Breaking Dawn film soundtrack. They also joined a US tour with the Foo Fighters and Social Distortion.

On 23 August 2012, the song, "Wolf's Law", was released as a free download from their then-upcoming second studio album of the same title. Two official singles, "This Ladder Is Ours" and "Cholla", were released in late 2012, the former peaking at no. 24 on the US Alternative Songs chart. The band's second studio album, Wolf's Law, was officially released on 21 January 2013 in the UK, and the following day in the U.S.

Most of the writing for Wolf's Law was done on the road during the 12-month tour in support of their previous record, The Big Roar. Commenting on the writing process for the album, Bryan explained that the songs for the album were approached with vocals and one accompaniment (either guitar or piano) before being built upon, stating, "It's all about the lyrics, the voice and the melody". The vocals and guitars were recorded in January 2012 in Maine, while drums and additional orchestral and choir pieces for the record were scored and recorded by the band in February 2012 in London. Mixing duties for the record were handled by Andy Wallace while the record's production was completed by the band. The album title referred to Wolff's law, a scientific theory by Julius Wolff which posits that bones may become stronger in response to stress as a form of adaptation. According to Bryan, this related to one of the major themes of the album, which is "relationships on the mend and feeling reinvigorated"; she continued that the album felt like the band reconnecting with themselves emotionally and spiritually.

For Record Store Day on 20 April 2013, the Joy Formidable released a limited-edition 12" single of "A Minute's Silence", an outtake from Wolf's Law, backed by a live cover of Bruce Springsteen's "Badlands". "Silent Treatment" was later released as the album's third and final single in July 2013. In July 2014, the band began releasing monthly vinyl singles, titled Aruthrol, consisting of songs sung in their native Welsh language released as a double A-side with a contribution by another artist. Three singles, "Yn Rhydiau'r Afon", "Tynnu Sylw" and "Y Garreg Ateb", were released exclusively on 7" vinyl in collaboration with Colorama, White Noise Sound and Bloom & Heavy Petting Zoo.

The band released their third studio album, Hitch, on 25 March 2016. The band also uploaded a new song titled "The Last Thing on My Mind", accompanied by a self-produced montage music video consisting of clips of scantily clad or nude men, which Bryan explained to be in response to the over-sexualisation of women in modern media, stating "We don't condone objectification in general, the point here is, when the media representation is imbalanced, if we're mostly seeing women sexualised or objectified, from a male perspective or otherwise, it's limited, it's damaging and frankly; it's boring too".[sic] The band released their fourth album, AAARTH, on 28 September 2018. The band also joined Foo Fighters for a short tour.

=== 2021–present ===
The band released their fifth album, Into the Blue, on 1 October 2021. The single "Into the Blue" was written in Wales but recorded in Utah, where they are residing. It was released in March 2021 in advance of the album. On 4 June 2022, the band began their world tour, starting in their home town of Mold, Wales, UK at the Rhosesmor Village Hall, Mold, Wales, before setting off to the US and back to many cities in Europe. On 11 October 2024, it was announced that drummer Matt Thomas had left the band.

== Discography ==
- The Big Roar (2011)
- Wolf's Law (2013)
- Hitch (2016)
- AAARTH (2018)
- Into the Blue (2021)
