= Black Bell Records =

- Founded: 2010
- Founder: Ayad Al Adhamy
- Distributor: ILG/Alternative Distribution Alliance
- Genre: Rock, pop
- Country of origin: United States
- Location: Brooklyn, New York

Black Bell Records is an independent record label based in New York City. The label was started in 2010 and is owned by Ayad Al Adhamy, who is member of the synthpop band, Passion Pit.

== History ==
The label was started to release the 8-track EP A Balloon Called Moaning by The Joy Formidable in the U.S. Jon Pareles of The New York Times praised the EP and its "cryptic lyrics that glint with urgency." The album also earned critical raves from Spin and Pitchfork.

Black Bell Records followed up with a one-off single with Dom that also featured Madeline from Cults and was produced by Ayad Al Adhamy. This was the first 7" single in a series that included Boston garage-pop band Girlfriends, Hardly Art alumni Pretty & Nice and duo Secret Music. In support of Record Store Day a limited run of 12" vinyl was made that included tracks by The Joy Formidable, ARMS, Normandy, and Soundcheck (a 50's rock and roll cover band started by Ayad Al Adhamy) Secret Music, Pretty & Nice and Dom.

Black Bell Records signed a distribution deal with ILG/Alternative Distribution Alliance in 2011 shortly after signing Secret Music, whose record would be Black Bell's first full-length album release on March 6, 2012.

== Artists ==
- Dom
- Girlfriends
- The Joy Formidable
- Pretty & Nice
- Secret Music
- Total Slacker
- Stepdad
