= Whirring =

2009 single by the Joy Formidable

Single by The Joy Formidable

from the EP A Balloon Called Moaning and the album The Big Roar
- Released: May 2009 (Original); 16 April 2011 (Re-release)
- Genre: Alternative rock, shoegazing
- Length: 6:47 (Album); 3:17 (Radio edit)
- Label: Atlantic
- Songwriter: The Joy Formidable
- Producers: The Joy Formidable, Rich Costey, Neak Menter

The Joy Formidable singles chronology
"I Don't Want to See You Like This" (2010)	"Whirring" (2009)	"A Heavy Abacus" (2011)

"Whirring" is a song by the Welsh alternative rock band the Joy Formidable. Written by the band, it was originally released on the band's debut EP, A Balloon Called Moaning, in 2009 before being re-released on the band's debut full-length album, The Big Roar, in 2011.

== Reception ==
Pitchfork ranked the song No. 68 on its list of the Top 100 Tracks of 2011, with author Amy Phillips writing: "The Joy Formidable aren't headlining soccer stadiums quite yet, but you wouldn't know it from listening to 'Whirring'. An aerobic rush of a song that builds to the kind of explosive alt-rock chorus that would've blown the roof off of '120 Minutes' circa 1995, it's the kind of thing that gets you pumped to run up a steep hill, lift heavy objects, or defeat Bob Dole's Presidential run."

== Music video ==
The original music video for "Whirring", directed by Dain Bedford, was released in 2009 and was filmed in Northern Wales. A second music video, directed by Christopher Mills, was released on 8 March 2011 on MTV's website. The 2011 version is a surrealist music video featuring the band exploring a house full of cats and them descending deeper and deeper through the house's layers.

The 2011 music video was the first video the air on the premiere episode of 120 Minutes with Matt Pinfield.

== In popular culture ==
A sample of "Whirring" was used for the Lonely Island song "YOLO", airing as an SNL Digital Short on 26 January 2013. "Whirring" is also featured on the soundtrack of the videogame Hi-Fi Rush, released in 2023.

== Track listings ==
All songs written by Ritzy Bryan and Rhydian Dafydd.

2009 7" Vinyl, Limited Edition

1. "Whirring" - 2:37
2. Chwyrlio - 3:52

US Record Store Day 2011 exclusive

1. Whirring - 3:17
2. Chwyrlio - 4:09

== Charts ==
=== Weekly charts ===
Chart (2011)	Peak position
US Alternative Songs (Billboard)	7
US Rock Songs (Billboard)	21

=== Year-end charts ===
Chart (2011)	Position
US Alternative Songs (Billboard)	25
