= SNL Digital Short =

Video shorts

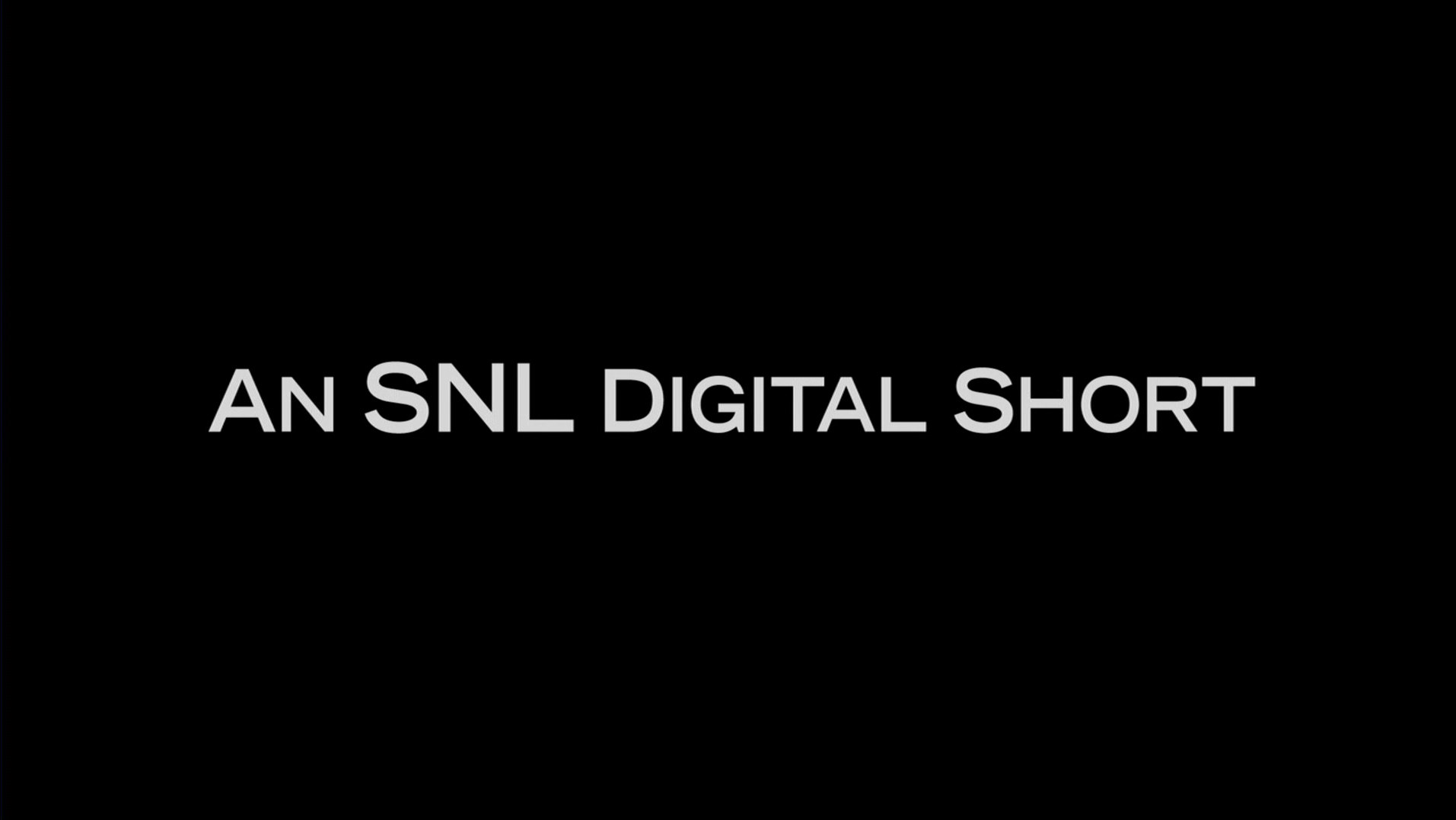
The opening title that appears before most shorts.

An SNL Digital Short is one in a series of comedic and often musical video shorts created for NBC's Saturday Night Live. The origin of the Digital Short brand is credited to staff writer Adam McKay, who created content for the show in collaboration with SNL hosts, writers, and cast members. The popularity of these segments exploded following the addition of the Lonely Island (Jorma Taccone, Akiva Schaffer, and Andy Samberg) to the show, and it is to them that credit is given for ushering SNL "into the age of digital online content in a time when it needed to tap into that relevance more than ever." The Lonely Island's digital shorts were originally recorded with consumer grade digital video cameras and edited on personal computers. It is typical for the show's hosts and musical guests to take part in that week's Digital Short (the latter on rarer occasions), and several shorts have included appearances by celebrities who were not scheduled to appear in any of that episode's live sketches.

The shorts generally took fewer than five days to complete. Schaffer directed a majority of them, with Taccone as occasional director or co-director. Taccone also produced music for the shorts as necessary, along with his brother, Asa.

Following Samberg's departure from SNL in 2012, it was speculated that the era of videos branded "An SNL Digital Short" had come to an end. A total of eight new Digital Shorts from The Lonely Island have aired since then: two that featured the episode's respective hosts (Adam Levine in Season 38 and Natalie Portman in Season 43); two that aired when Samberg hosted the Season 39 finale in 2014; one created for the Saturday Night Live 40th Anniversary Special in February 2015 (featuring Samberg & Adam Sandler); one that aired during the Season 41 finale in May 2016 to promote The Lonely Island's feature film, Popstar: Never Stop Never Stopping; and three that aired in Season 50, with one being in the Saturday Night Live 50th Anniversary Special.

In 2024, Samberg, Schaffer, and Taccone, alongside Seth Meyers, began The Lonely Island and Seth Meyers Podcast, a rewatch podcast covering the production of every digital short.

== List of shorts ==
=== 2005–2006: Season 31 ===
A total of 11 SNL Digital Shorts were created for the 2005–2006 season.

Title	Written by	Directed by	Original airdate	Order	Description
Lettuce	Will Forte	Akiva Schaffer	December 3, 2005	1	In what is revealed to be a commercial for the vegetable, two friends (Forte, Andy Samberg) discuss the death of an unnamed friend while taking large bites out of heads of lettuce. Written and filmed in November 2005 and originally cut after airing during the dress rehearsal of the Eva Longoria episode. Currently banned on YouTube in many regions including the US.
Lazy Sunday	Andy Samberg; Akiva Schaffer; Jorma Taccone; Chris Parnell	Akiva Schaffer	December 17, 2005	2	Parnell and Samberg perform rap about going out to see The Chronicles of Narnia: The Lion, the Witch and the Wardrobe on a typical Sunday, while also getting themselves food and acing the pre-film trivia questions. The short became a viral video online. Music produced by Jorma Taccone.
Young Chuck Norris	Harper Steele	Akiva Schaffer	January 21, 2006	3	A Chuck Norris fan (Jason Sudeikis) sings a rock ballad about the action star (Samberg) before he became famous. There are cameos by Fred Armisen as a criminal mugging a woman, played by Amy Poehler, and Taccone as a man being robbed by Bill Hader.
The Tangent	Bill Hader	Akiva Schaffer	February 4, 2006	4	Joel (Armisen) rambles endlessly about a restaurant he visited to his friend Liz (Kristen Wiig) at first, and becomes so involved in the story that he fails to notice that he is discovered by talent scouts (Hader, Parnell), stars in a movie with Scarlett Johansson, becomes a national phenomenon, and then loses it all when his movie flops at the box office. Brian Williams, MTV correspondent Gideon Yago, and Conan O'Brien also make cameo appearances. This short was filmed the week of the Johansson episode, but was cut after dress rehearsal from both that episode and the Peter Sarsgaard episode before finally airing on the Steve Martin/Prince episode.
Close Talkers	Will Forte	Akiva Schaffer	February 4, 2006	5	Two old friends from school (Forte, Steve Martin) meet up after years apart, greeting each other loudly while standing with their faces only an inch apart.
Natalie's Rap	Andy Samberg; Akiva Schaffer; Jorma Taccone; Asa Taccone	Akiva Schaffer	March 4, 2006	6	Natalie Portman is interviewed about her life and responds with a rap proving she is a "badass bitch", poking fun at her clean and intellectual image. She slaps Seth Meyers and throws a chair at Parnell. Samberg appears as Carl, a character dressed as Flavor Flav. Music produced by Jorma Taccone and Asa Taccone, and mixed by Ben Lovett.
Doppleganger	Andy Samberg; Akiva Schaffer; Jorma Taccone	Akiva Schaffer	March 11, 2006	7	Meyers, Forte, and Samberg are on a lunch break and start to notice that each one has a doppelgänger nearby. After Meyers and Forte say that a large bum (Horatio Sanz) is Samberg's doppelgänger, they kill the real Samberg in an evil twin scenario.
Laser Cats!	Andy Samberg; Lorne Michaels; Bill Hader	Akiva Schaffer	April 15, 2006	8	In a frame story, Hader and Samberg pitch their new ultra low-budget Digital Short, Laser Cats! to SNL executive producer Lorne Michaels. In the Laser Cats! short itself (a short within a short), Hader and Samberg play the heroes Nitro and Admiral Spaceship in a post-nuclear war world in which cats can shoot lasers from their mouths and are used as weapons. They are saving the princess (Lindsay Lohan) from the evil Robotron (Will Forte). Rachel Dratch makes an appearance, disguising herself as the princess/Lohan. Jorma Taccone appears in the opening credits for Laser Cats!. Fred Armisen also makes a cameo. Laser Cats! is shot in the SNL offices with gleeful haphazardness because, according to Samberg in the special Saturday Night Live in the 2000s, “it’s supposed to suck.”
My Testicles	Unknown	Akiva Schaffer	May 6, 2006	9	Friends in the early 1990s (Kenan Thompson, Forte, and Parnell) discuss the music video by pop stars Ariel (Samberg) and Efrim (Tom Hanks), where we see the lyrics consist of constantly begging for their testicles not to be harmed, in a parody of Right Said Fred's "I'm Too Sexy" and C+C Music Factory's "Gonna Make You Sweat". Armisen plays the guitar player, Taccone appears as a backup dancer, and Poehler and Maya Rudolph are women in the video.
Peyote	Andy Samberg; Akiva Schaffer; Jorma Taccone; Will Forte	Akiva Schaffer	May 13, 2006	10	A distraught man (Samberg), pressed against the side of a building, threatens to jump to his death. A second man (Forte), using a bullhorn, tries to talk him out of it. After a bit of dialogue, it is revealed that the distraught man is safely on the ground and his friend is kneeling mere inches away from him. The short ends after it is revealed to be a commercial for peyote. Peyote was written and filmed after Lettuce had aired, making it the second SNL Digital Short made by The Lonely Island. It was deemed "too similar" to Lettuce to be aired right away, however, so the group produced Lazy Sunday to showcase other aspects of their comedic range.
Andy Walking	Andy Samberg	Akiva Schaffer	May 20, 2006	11	Samberg asks factual questions of passers-by outside NBC Studios in the style of the Jay Leno bit Jaywalking, instead laughing off correct answers as false. John Lutz (a then-writer for SNL) makes a cameo as a man walking that Andy ridicules.

=== 2006–2007: Season 32 ===
A total of 12 SNL Digital Shorts were created for the 2006–2007 season.

Title	Written by	Directed by	Original airdate	Order	Description
Cubicle Fight	John Lutz; Bill Hader	Akiva Schaffer	September 30, 2006	12	New office employee Gary (Bill Hader) gets into a fight to the death with incumbent cubicle holder Steve (episode host Dane Cook). Jason Sudeikis appears as the boss and Andy Samberg, Will Forte, Fred Armisen, Kenan Thompson, Amy Poehler and Kristen Wiig are other employees cheering on the fight.
Harpoon Man	Andy Samberg; Akiva Schaffer; Jorma Taccone	Akiva Schaffer	October 21, 2006	13	Harpoon Man (episode host John C. Reilly), a suave action hero and parody of Shaft, tracks down an insulting announcer dressed as a whale (Samberg), who is narrating his life in a theme song. There are appearances by Jorma Taccone, who plays a man getting robbed, and Bill Hader, who plays the man robbing Taccone.
Pep Talk	Fred Armisen; John Lutz	Akiva Schaffer	December 9, 2006	14	A fast food boss (Armisen) gives his employees (Forte, Matthew Fox, Poehler, Samberg, Thompson) a pep talk and has trouble controlling his anger until one of his employees (Forte) comes in late. It originally was scheduled to air on the episode hosted by Matthew Fox (which explains his appearance), but ended up airing on the following episode hosted by Annette Bening.
Dick in a Box	Andy Samberg; Akiva Schaffer; Jorma Taccone	Akiva Schaffer	December 16, 2006	15	A Christmas song about two men (Justin Timberlake and Samberg) giving their lovers (Kristen Wiig and Maya Rudolph) a box with their genitalia inside as presents, in a style reminiscent of early 1990s R&B sex ballads made popular by acts such as Bell Biv Devoe, Color Me Badd, and R. Kelly. Won a 2007 Creative Arts Primetime Emmy for Outstanding Music and Lyrics. Music created in part by Asa Taccone, Jorma Taccone and Katreese Barnes. It was the first official single from The Lonely Island's debut album, Incredibad.
Laser Cats! 2	Andy Samberg; Akiva Schaffer; Jorma Taccone; Bill Hader	Akiva Schaffer	January 13, 2007	16	In the same frame-story format, Hader and Samberg apologize to Lorne Michaels for the original Laser Cats! claiming to understand where they went wrong: not enough politics. They then introduce Laser Cats! 2, based on the same premise, now set in the Iraq War which has gone nuclear and caused the feline mutations. This time, Dr. Scientist (Jake Gyllenhaal) has stolen the cure that turns Laser Cats back into regular cats. Jorma Taccone appears in the opening credits for Laser Cats! 2 (Which is the same as Laser Cats!), and Fred Armisen and Amy Poehler are the scientists who created the cure.
Nurse Nancy	Matt Murray	Akiva Schaffer	January 20, 2007	17	Scott Garbaciak (Samberg) is the multi-role star in a commercial for the fictional film Nurse Nancy, in parody of Eddie Murphy films such as Norbit and The Nutty Professor.
Body Fuzion	Amy Poehler; Maya Rudolph; Kristen Wiig	Akiva Schaffer	February 3, 2007	18	Drew Barrymore is Desiree, host of a 1986 sexually suggestive, low-impact, high-result exercise video Body Fuzion, with "her friends" Donna, Michelle, and Donna M. (Rudolph, Wiig, and Poehler respectively).
Andy Popping Into Frame	Andy Samberg; Akiva Schaffer; Jorma Taccone	Akiva Schaffer	February 10, 2007	19	Samberg quietly pops into view as the camera cuts to different locations and landmarks. Forte begins doing the same, before being forced out by Samberg at gunpoint. Samberg wears his "Andy" shirt from the failed sketch show Awesometown created by The Lonely Island.
Business Meeting	Jorma Taccone; Seth Meyers	Jorma Taccone	February 24, 2007	20	A corporate executive (Rainn Wilson) leads a meeting to brainstorm ideas on how to save his failing company, fielding suggestions from an increasingly bizarre set of employees, including a gigantic turkey sub and musical guest Arcade Fire. Upon reaching the end of the meeting, Wilson receives a phone call, seemingly informing him that the office building is about to be blown up. The office building explodes, presumably killing all of the people inside. Amy Poehler, Bill Hader, Jason Sudeikis, Kristen Wiig, Will Forte, Darrell Hammond, Fred Armisen, Maya Rudolph and Andy Samberg all play employees of Wilson's, and Kenan Thompson plays a water delivery guy.
Dear Sister	Andy Samberg; Akiva Schaffer; Jorma Taccone	Akiva Schaffer	April 14, 2007	21	In a spoof of The O.C. episode "The Dearly Beloved", a man (Hader) writes a letter to his sister, he is shot by his friend (Samberg), leading to a series of overly dramatic, slow-motion shootings set to "Hide and Seek" by Imogen Heap, including their roommate (Shia LaBeouf), the sister (Wiig), and two police officers (Sudeikis, Armisen).
Roy Rules!	Andy Samberg; Jorma Taccone	Jorma Taccone	April 21, 2007	22	Samberg performs a rhyme about how much he likes his brother in-law named Roy (SNL writer Bryan Tucker).
Talking Dog	Andy Samberg; Akiva Schaffer; Jorma Taccone	Akiva Schaffer	May 19, 2007	23	While meeting the owner of an apartment (Zach Braff) that is available for sublet, a potential candidate (Samberg) is shocked to find out that the owner's dog (voiced by Taccone) not only can talk, but has fallen in love with him. He finds out later that the dog was using him to get a plate of ham. The owner implies that this happens regularly, but the dog convinces the man that it's still something more, and the man ends up French kissing the dog.

=== 2007–2008: Season 33 ===
A total of 11 SNL Digital Shorts were created for the 2007–2008 season.

Title	Written by	Directed by	Original airdate	Order	Description
Iran So Far	Andy Samberg; Akiva Schaffer; Jorma Taccone	Akiva Schaffer	September 29, 2007	24	Samberg sings a love song for Mahmoud Ahmadinejad (Armisen), along with Adam Levine from Maroon 5, sampling "Avril 14th" by Aphex Twin, with a chorus based on the 1982 A Flock of Seagulls hit "I Ran (So Far Away)". Jake Gyllenhaal has a cameo, owing to the observation that Ahmadinejad looks like "a very hairy Jake Gyllenhaal".
People Getting Punched Just Before Eating	Andy Samberg	Akiva Schaffer	October 13, 2007	25	In a style similar to the Season 32 Digital Short Andy Popping Into Frame, Samberg sneaks up on people and punches them just as they are about to start eating their respective foods, then gleefully dances afterwards. His victims include Forte, Armisen, Sudeikis, Taccone, episode host Jon Bon Jovi, and Taylor Hawkins and Dave Grohl of the Foo Fighters. The victims, who have turned into zombies, show up en masse and chase Samberg around the world before breaking out into the Zombie Dance. The shorts ends with a close-up shot of Samberg's face above a graphic that reads, "Believe in Your Dreams".
Brian Diaries	Akiva Schaffer; Brian Williams	Akiva Schaffer	November 3, 2007	26	Brian Williams describes his daily routine, which includes watching footage of himself, meditating while the disembodied head of Bono praises him, and dropping pennies out a window onto Al Roker and Matt Lauer during The Today Show.
Grandkids in the Movies	Andy Samberg; Akiva Schaffer; Bill Hader	Akiva Schaffer	February 23, 2008	27	An old man presents a series of DVDs that are designed to help old people feel more at ease while watching today's films by having his grandsons (Hader and Samberg) digitally inserted in the films. Featuring clips from No Country for Old Men, Michael Clayton, Juno, Transformers (referred to as "The Transforming Robots"), and There Will Be Blood.
The Mirror	Andy Samberg; Akiva Schaffer	Akiva Schaffer	March 1, 2008	28	A girl (Elliot Page) wakes up from a nightmare and begins seeing a goofy ghoul (Samberg) in her bathroom mirror, which turns out to be the nightmare of the ghoul, a wolf man (Forte), and a woman named Debbie Lieberstein (Wiig) who is married to Dracula (Sudeikis). After several nightmares, the camera returns to Page waking up from a nightmare, and as the short ends, the ghoul pops up at their bedside.
Hero Song	Andy Samberg; Akiva Schaffer	Akiva Schaffer	March 8, 2008	29	An apparently wealthy man (Samberg) sings about crime infecting the city, then turns into a superhero (à la Batman) and tries to save a woman (Amy Adams) from being mugged, only to have the mugger (Sudeikis) beat him to death.
Andy's Dad	Andy Samberg; Akiva Schaffer; Jonah Hill	Akiva Schaffer	March 15, 2008	30	Episode host Jonah Hill confesses to Samberg that he has fallen in love with his father, Ben Samberg (played by longtime SNL writer Jim Downey). Hader also confesses the same thing.
Laser Cats! 3D	Andy Samberg; Akiva Schaffer	Akiva Schaffer	April 5, 2008	31	Samberg and Hader interrupt Lorne Michaels' dinner with Christopher Dodd (appearing as himself) to attempt to pitch Laser Cats! again, this time with a scene enhanced by 3D glasses. The plot revolves around a ban on all laser cats and a battle against the corrupt Mayor Top-Hat (Thompson). Christopher Walken appears as a general.
Daiquiri Girl	Andy Samberg; Akiva Schaffer	Akiva Schaffer	April 12, 2008	32	Samberg appears in an amateur, early-90s music video about a girl who loves to drink daiquiris. Meanwhile, text scrolls up the screen explaining that the producers apologize for airing the video because a certain musical guest (Gnarls Barkley) failed to appear for the shooting of a digital short, despite an agreement to do otherwise.
Best Look in the World	Andy Samberg; Akiva Schaffer	Akiva Schaffer	May 10, 2008	33	Samberg and host Shia LaBeouf sing a high-energy country song for an infomercial about Samberg's new dress shirt, black socks, no pants look (the best look in the world). Armisen, Forte, Thompson, Sudeikis, and Hader all appear as people following the trend (a dad, a husband, two cops, and an illiterate genie).
The Japanese Office	John Lutz; Marika Sawyer	Akiva Schaffer	May 17, 2008	34	Ricky Gervais presents a clip from a Japanese show that was his inspiration for The Office, featuring Japanese versions of Michael (Steve Carell), Dwight (Hader), Jim (Sudeikis), Pam (Wiig), and Stanley (Thompson). Additionally, Darrell Hammond plays Regis Philbin in a tampon commercial. At the end of the episode, Gervais comments "It's funny 'cause it's racist."

=== 2008–2009: Season 34 ===
A total of 17 SNL Digital Shorts were created for the 2008–2009 season.

Title	Written by	Directed by	Original airdate	Order	Description
Space Olympics	Andy Samberg; Akiva Schaffer; Jorma Taccone	Akiva Schaffer	September 13, 2008	35	Samberg, dressed in a white pompadour wig and spangled jumpsuit, sings a song promoting a low-budget, ill-planned, ultimately doomed athletic competition held in space in the year 3022. Athletes are portrayed by Sudeikis, Casey Wilson, Hader, and episode host Michael Phelps.
Hey! (Murray Hill)	Akiva Schaffer; Jorma Taccone	Jorma Taccone	September 20, 2008	36	In this spoof of teen dramas, a young man (James Franco) is talked to by a girl (Kristen Wiig). Some small talk is made, until the subject of his small "ding-dong" comes up. Then another girl (an uncredited cameo by future season 35 host Blake Lively) comes up to him and tells him she has a small "ding-dong", too.
Extreme Activities Challenge	Andy Samberg; Akiva Schaffer; Jorma Taccone	Akiva Schaffer	October 4, 2008	37	Samberg and Wiig compete in nonsensical activities, from arm wrestling to human ATM. Forte is the pathetic referee, Thompson is an ATM customer, and Anne Hathaway appears when Samberg wins the "become Jane" (Austen) challenge.
Jam the Vote	Unknown	Akiva Schaffer	October 23, 2008	38	Samberg walks around New York City asking people if they're registered to vote, which Wiig's character points out had ended two weeks prior. Meanwhile, Samberg also fights back vomiting a spicy hot dog he stole. (Aired with the official "An SNL Digital Short" title card during the third episode of the show's limited-run series Weekend Update Thursday.)
Ras Trent	Andy Samberg; Akiva Schaffer; Jorma Taccone	Akiva Schaffer	October 25, 2008	39	Samberg plays a college student legalist who has converted to Rastafari, who sings boastfully (and stereotypically) about the culture, while being aware that he is not fit for it when he walks by a group of actual Rastas. Wiig and Wilson appear in the short as backup singers; the actual backup vocals were recorded by Joanna Newsom and Maya Rudolph. Music produced by Sly & Robbie.
Everyone's A Critic	Andy Samberg; Akiva Schaffer; Jorma Taccone	Akiva Schaffer; Jorma Taccone	November 15, 2008	40	In a clip from Paul Rudd's new movie, Samberg romantically paints him nude and then Rudd returns the favor (A parody of the film Titanic). While selling the painting at an auction, it is shown to be so graphic that everyone who sees it begins convulsing violently, vomiting, bleeding from the eyes, and committing violent acts of suicide. Fred Armisen appears as the auctioneer, Bill Hader and Kristen Wiig as Indiana Jones and Marion Ravenwood respectively (parodying the ending of Raiders of the Lost Ark), and Casey Wilson as the interviewer.
Virgania Horsen's Pony Express	Kristen Wiig	Akiva Schaffer	December 6, 2008	41	Kristen Wiig reprises her role as Virgania Horsen in a crudely made commercial for her new business, which consists of mail delivery by horse. (The first short featuring Wiig in this role, Virgania Horsen’s Hot Air Balloon Rides, originally aired on February 23, 2008 without the official "An SNL Digital Short" title card.)
Jizz in My Pants	Andy Samberg; Akiva Schaffer; Jorma Taccone	Akiva Schaffer	December 6, 2008	42	Samberg and Taccone rap about their personal experiences with premature ejaculation, often at the slightest provocation. Schaffer plays the role of a DJ who mixes beats for the other two as they perform. Molly Sims, Jamie-Lynn Sigler, and Justin Timberlake make cameo appearances. The third single from The Lonely Island's debut album, Incredibad, and the first music video featuring all three members. Portions of the video also appear in the James Franco 2010 documentary, Saturday Night, which was filmed during this December 1-6, 2008 production week.
Cookies	James Anderson; Fred Armisen	Akiva Schaffer	December 13, 2008	43	A corporate executive (Hugh Laurie) announces to the department heads that things are not going well and drastic steps may need to be taken. As the others ask questions and fret about their futures, Marcus (Armisen) becomes increasingly distracting as he stretches himself out to reach a plate of cookies on the table. At the end of the skit, another executive (Thompson) reveals that the "cookies" are really laxatives. Jason Sudeikis, Will Forte, Bobby Moynihan, and Abby Elliott appear as the other department heads.
Doogie Howser Theme	Akiva Schaffer; Jorma Taccone	Akiva Schaffer	January 10, 2009	44	Neil Patrick Harris and the entire SNL cast perform the theme to Doogie Howser, M.D.. Harris wears a tuxedo while everyone else is dressed as Doogie Howser in blonde wigs, lab coats with a picture ID of Doogie on them, dress shirts, colorful ties, acid washed jeans, and Nike hi-tops (Armisen and Samberg wear green sunglasses as well). Harris plays keyboard; Wilson, Elliott, and Michaela Watkins play violin; Moynihan plays tuba; Thompson plays harp; Hader plays saxophone; Hammond plays trumpet; Wiig plays electric guitar; Sudeikis plays double bass; Forte plays drum kit; Armisen plays synthesizer; and Samberg plays an Akai MPC 2000XL drum machine. At the end of the performance, Harris sheds a single tear.
A Couple of Homies	Andy Samberg; Akiva Schaffer; Will Forte	Akiva Schaffer	January 17, 2009	45	Samberg and Fred Armisen casually talk in a break room while Forte sings about every little thing that they're doing (giving each other a high five, reading magazines, drinking soda, and wearing dresses). At the end, it's revealed to actually be a commercial for the D.A.R.E. program. It was originally cut from the Ben Affleck dress rehearsal.
Laser Cats! 4 Ever	Andy Samberg; Akiva Schaffer; Jorma Taccone	Akiva Schaffer	January 31, 2009	46	Episode host Steve Martin walks into the office of Lorne Michaels and asks if he could air a short video that he and "some film people" made, which turns out to be yet another installment of Laser Cats!. It becomes evident that Samberg and Bill Hader have put Martin up to the task of presenting the short, crediting him as Executive Producer as well. A "half human, half Laser Cat, half RoboCop" named Cyber-Face (Kenan Thompson) is presented to a group of scientists by their colleague (Will Forte) but quickly goes haywire. Admiral Spaceship (Samberg) and Nitro (Hader) intervene to put an end to its killing spree, and are shocked to find out that Cyber-Face is Admiral Spaceship's estranged father (Martin) right before he is gunned down by police officers. Cyber-Face apologizes for being a deadbeat dad and reveals that Spaceship and Nitro are brothers before self-destructing. Michaels kicks everyone out of his office in disgust.
I'm on a Boat	Andy Samberg; Akiva Schaffer; Jorma Taccone	Akiva Schaffer	February 7, 2009	47	Samberg wins a prize from a cereal box for a boat trip for three people and selects Schaffer and, to Taccone's surprise and dismay, T-Pain to join him. The short then cuts to the lucky trio performing an "aggressive" and expletive-laden rap about their boat ride (the word "fuck" is used 17 times), with occasional shots of Taccone having a miserable time back on land. The fourth single from The Lonely Island's debut album, Incredibad.
Property of the Queen	Andy Samberg; Akiva Schaffer; Jorma Taccone	Akiva Schaffer Jorma Taccone	February 14, 2009	48	Samberg blackmails the Jonas Brothers with a videotape of them as an '80s band called Property of the Queen. Samberg ultimately wants to know how they stayed young for 25 years and it is revealed that the wizard featured in one of their music videos (Bill Hader) kept them young. Kenan Thompson, Will Forte, and Bobby Moynihan appear as band members.
Party Guys	Andy Samberg; Akiva Schaffer; Jorma Taccone; Bill Hader	Akiva Schaffer	March 14, 2009	49	Samberg and Hader are at a party where everyone and everything is a literal representation of a slang term (i.e., a "serial rapist" (Forte) is shown having sex with a box of cereal, a group of "motherfuckers" are men with their mothers, a group of "sons of bitches" are a litter of puppies, a "numbnuts" is a man (John Lutz) shown sitting on a block of ice with his pants around his ankles, a group of "jokers" are dressed as different incarnations of The Joker from The Dark Knight, a knucklehead is a hand with plastic eyes glued on it, etc.). When Samberg and Hader discover "two douchebags", however, it's revealed that they're looking at themselves in a mirror.
Like a Boss	Andy Samberg; Akiva Schaffer; Jorma Taccone	Akiva Schaffer; Jorma Taccone	April 4, 2009	50	During a performance review conducted by episode host Seth Rogen, Samberg raps about his typical day as the boss of a large company. The first few activities he names are what one might expect, such as approving memos and micromanaging his staff (John Mulaney). His actions become increasingly erratic, however, after a subordinate (Kristin Wiig) rejects his advances and he is consequently denied a promotion. The boss's description ends with him turning into a jet, crashing into the sun, and dying. Rogen leaves the performance review in apparent disgust as Samberg repeatedly reminds him, "I'm the boss." The fifth single from The Lonely Island's debut album, Incredibad, Rogen's voice replaces Schaffer's as the company evaluator, though Schaffer does appear in the short as a hooded gun dealer. Taccone also makes a cameo appearance as the man who hands Samberg a notice about a harassment lawsuit filed by Wiig. Additional cameos from Bobby Moynihan, Casey Wilson, SNL writer Paula Pell, Jason Sudeikis, and Bill Hader.
Motherlover	Andy Samberg; Akiva Schaffer; Jorma Taccone	Akiva Schaffer; Jorma Taccone	May 9, 2009	51	Five months after the events of "Dick in a Box," Samberg and Timberlake's characters (who have just been released from prison) sing about special gifts for Mother's Day, with Susan Sarandon and Patricia Clarkson appearing as their mothers. They decide the best present for them would be for them to have sex with the other's mother. They proclaim it is the second best idea they have ever had. The song was originally omitted from sessions for the album Incredibad, as produced by Asa Taccone and Drew Campbell. The fourth single from The Lonely Island's second album, Turtleneck & Chain.

=== 2009–2010: Season 35 ===
A total of 19 SNL Digital Shorts were created for the 2009–2010 season.

Title	Written by	Directed by	Original airdate	Order	Description
The Date	Will Forte; John Solomon	John Solomon	September 26, 2009	52	A man (Forte) with a strained voice discusses his life commanding a SWAT team and raising lambs for slaughter with an increasingly fascinated date (Megan Fox).
Megan's Roommate	Andy Samberg; Akiva Schaffer; Jorma Taccone	Akiva Schaffer	September 26, 2009	53	Andy Samberg is brought home by Megan Fox, and meets her hostile roommate "Optimus Prime" (Moynihan), a man wearing a bathing robe and a mask of the Transformers character. Cameo by Brian Austin Green as "Bumblebee".
Threw It On The Ground	Andy Samberg; Akiva Schaffer; Jorma Taccone	Akiva Schaffer	October 3, 2009	54	A beatnik (Samberg) performs slam poetry about how he fights "the system" by throwing objects on the ground. His actions quickly become bizarre as he throws a child's birthday cake, his girlfriend's cellphone, and a fish bowl on the ground for no apparent reason. Things take a turn for the worse when the beatnik attacks Ryan Reynolds and Elijah Wood (both appearing as themselves) during their dinner by flipping their table. An incensed Wood and Reynolds chase down the beatnik and taser him "in the butthole." The 15th track on The Lonely Island's second album, Turtleneck & Chain.
Brenda & Shaun	Akiva Schaffer; Fred Armisen	Akiva Schaffer	October 10, 2009	55	A 1990s commercial for two amateur laser magicians (played by Fred Armisen and episode host Drew Barrymore). They announce they are suitable for any occasion such as birthday parties, but disrupt events such as graduations, engagements, and people meeting their biological parents. As the video progresses, the two fall on hard times and are arrested for harassing people on the street.
Firelight	Akiva Schaffer; Seth Meyers	Akiva Schaffer	November 7, 2009	56	In this parody of the movie adaptation of Twilight, a high school girl (played by host and musical guest Taylor Swift) falls for Frankenstein's monster (played by Bill Hader).
Get Out!	Andy Samberg; Fred Armisen	Akiva Schaffer	November 14, 2009	57	A man (Armisen) keeps barging in on his roommate (Samberg) sitting on the toilet – even when Armisen is at the gym, on an elevator, and walking outside of Studio 8H at 30 Rockefeller Center.
Reba (Two Worlds Collide)	Andy Samberg; Akiva Schaffer; Jorma Taccone	Akiva Schaffer	November 21, 2009	58	Andy Samberg sings a very raunchy techno/hip-hop ballad about his love, Reba McEntire. Samberg seems completely unaware that "Reba" is actually just a homeless man (played by Kenan Thompson) who found a red wig in a dumpster and is masquerading as the country superstar despite looking and sounding nothing like her. Bonus track on Lonely Island's new album, Turtleneck and Chain.
Shy Ronnie	Andy Samberg; Akiva Schaffer; Jorma Taccone	Akiva Schaffer	December 5, 2009	59	Rihanna and a redheaded nerd named Shy Ronnie (Samberg) perform an uplifting song for a classroom full of children, but the song is ruined by Shy Ronnie's weak singing (and bladder control). Rihanna eventually leaves, at which point Ronnie mouths off to the kids. This short was nominated for an Emmy for outstanding music.
The Tizzle Wizzle Show (Jammy Shuffle)	Andy Samberg; Akiva Schaffer; Jorma Taccone	Akiva Schaffer; Jorma Taccone	December 19, 2009	60	James Franco guest stars on a children's show about wearing "jammies," and performs the "jammy shuffle." The background singers then announce that it is time for the cast to take pills and attack each other in the dark with knives. When the lights come back on, only a horrified, blood-covered Franco is left alive; the singers dub him the "king" as he screams for help.
Booty Call	Andy Samberg	Jonathan Krisel	January 9, 2010	61	Alicia Keys makes a late-night phone call to a flamboyant, yet socially awkward man (Samberg), who is talking to her during an intervention for his heroin-addicted friend.
James Cameron's Laser Cats 5	Andy Samberg; Bill Hader; Jonathan Krisel	Jonathan Krisel	January 16, 2010	62	Samberg and Hader once again try to persuade Lorne Michaels with another Laser Cats! movie with some "help" from James Cameron (appearing as himself). The short includes many references to James Cameron's films, including Aliens (Sigourney Weaver reprises her role as Ellen Ripley), The Terminator, Titanic, and Avatar.
The Curse	Andy Samberg	Jonathan Krisel	January 30, 2010	63	In a loose parody of Sam Raimi's Drag Me to Hell, a young businessman (Samberg) is cursed by a homeless shaman (Fred Armisen) to be haunted by a sexy, shirtless saxophonist named Sergio (played by host Jon Hamm) after stepping on the shaman's dreamcatcher and not paying for it. The saxophonist is loosely based on a scene from the 1987 film The Lost Boys featuring musician Timmy Cappello.
Flags of the World	Andy Samberg; Akiva Schaffer; Jonathan Krisel	Jonathan Krisel	February 27, 2010	64	Samberg raps about the many different flags of the world, including the American flag, "Spain-ish" flag, "We Love Betty White" flag (referring to the campaign on Facebook to get her to host the show), "No You Didn't" flag, and a "Black Flag" based on the band of the same name. Episode host Jennifer Lopez makes a cameo.
Zach Drops By the Set	Zach Galifianakis	Jonathan Krisel	March 6, 2010	65	Zach Galifianakis shows up on the sets of various NBC shows (with fictional scenes and archival footage) either talking to the actors, or just standing in the background, finishing with a clip from a 1984 SNL episode hosted by Robin Williams showing a bearded child (supposedly Galifinakis) and the words: "Zack Galifinakis: on TV for over 30 years." The NBC Website has posted this as a Digital Short, despite that it didn't have the "SNL Digital Short" title screen on the televised version.
Boombox	Andy Samberg; Akiva Schaffer; Jorma Taccone; Asa Taccone	Akiva Schaffer	March 13, 2010	66	A music video for the song "Boombox" featuring Samberg and Julian Casablancas. The second verse from the album version of the song was not included in the video. Cameos by Schaffer (dancing with two cops), Fred Armisen (the Spanish guy doing the Bartman), and Bobby Moynihan (the orderly in the old folks' home who steals one of the resident's money). The eighth track on The Lonely Island's first album, Incredibad.
The Other Man	Andy Samberg; Akiva Schaffer; Jorma Taccone; John Mulaney	Akiva Schaffer	April 17, 2010	67	A man named Kyle (Ryan Phillippe) keeps knocking on his loved ones' (ex-girlfriend, best friend, parents, etc.) doors to find that they are romantically involved with a man with a bizarre European accent (Samberg). Eventually, the European man shows up at Kyle's house, wanting to have sex with him. But Kyle reveals that he's already having sex with the European's twin brother.
Cherry Battle	Andy Samberg; Akiva Schaffer; Jorma Taccone	Akiva Schaffer; Jorma Taccone	April 24, 2010	68	Gabourey Sidibe and Andy Samberg (dressed in kimono) spit cherries at each other in rapid succession, catching the ones the other throws. At the end, Samberg spits one last cherry at Sidibe. The cherry sings dramatic music in midair before Sidibe just misses catching it in her mouth. They bow.
Golden Girls' Theme	Andy Samberg; Akiva Schaffer	Akiva Schaffer; Jonathan Krisel	May 8, 2010	69	Samberg shows Betty White how grateful the entire SNL cast is to have her host by having the cast and guest stars (Rachel Dratch, Tina Fey, Ana Gasteyer, Amy Poehler, Maya Rudolph, and Molly Shannon) sing the theme song from The Golden Girls. White likes it but then shows her own version to the cast: a death metal trash rock version, with the cast members being attacked by leather-clad mosh pit dancers.
Great Day	Andy Samberg; Akiva Schaffer; Jorma Taccone	Jorma Taccone; Akiva Schaffer	May 15, 2010	70	An unemployed cocaine addict named Dennis (Samberg) goes on drug binge while singing an elaborately choreographed Disneyesque musical-theater number about how it is going to be a great day. The more cocaine he snorts, the faster he sings, and the more disjointed and surreal the song becomes. Eventually the whole experience is revealed to be a vivid, cocaine-induced hallucination. Cameos by Bobby Moynihan as Mailman Fred, Taccone as Dennis's friend who asks about his pledge to run with the bulls in Spain, episode host Alec Baldwin and musical guest Tom Petty as themselves, and Bill Hader and Nasim Pedrad as a neighborhood couple walking by a hallucinating Dennis. Fred Armisen also appears briefly as Dennis's boss. Featured on the DVD accompanying The Lonely Island's second album, Turtleneck & Chain.

=== 2010–2011: Season 36 ===
A total of 17 SNL Digital Shorts were created for the 2010–2011 season.

Title	Written by	Directed by	Original airdate	Order	Description
Boogerman	Andy Samberg; Akiva Schaffer; Jonathan Krisel	Akiva Schaffer; Jonathan Krisel	September 26, 2010	71	Katy Perry sings at an Academy Awards-like ceremony the theme song from the superhero film Boogerman (played by Peter Sarsgaard). Features most of the cast including episode host Amy Poehler.
Rescue Dogs 3D App	Andy Samberg; Akiva Schaffer; Jonathan Krisel	Akiva Schaffer; Jonathan Krisel	October 2, 2010	72	A man (Samberg) tries to call 911 to report a home invasion on his iPhone using the app "911 Emergency," but is bombarded with ads for the movie Rescue Dogs 3D. At the end, Samberg is caught by the burglars, only to be saved by Rescue Dog. Helen Mirren appears as the police chief in the trailer for Rescue Dogs 3D.
Relaxation Therapy	Andy Samberg; Akiva Schaffer; Jonathan Krisel	Akiva Schaffer; Jonathan Krisel	October 9, 2010	73	A man (Samberg) is the subject of a bizarre therapy session conducted by his psychiatrist (played by episode host Jane Lynch) who inserts herself in his self-conscious images of peace and tranquility.
I Broke My Arm	Andy Samberg; Akiva Schaffer; Jonathan Krisel	Akiva Schaffer	October 23, 2010	74	A girl (played by episode host Emma Stone) sings in her school's cafeteria about breaking her arm by slipping on grape jelly. Her situation only worsens as each verse ends with her falling again, breaking a new appendage until she ends up paralyzed, a wheelchair user, and only able to talk through a computer program a la Stephen Hawking. The grape jelly (Andy Samberg) comes to life and claims not to be the cause of the girl's broken appendages.
Shy Ronnie 2: Ronnie and Clyde	Andy Samberg; Akiva Schaffer	Akiva Schaffer	October 30, 2010	75	Shy Ronnie (Samberg) and Clyde (Rihanna) team up for a second time to rob a bank. Unfortunately, Ronnie's social awkwardness puts the heist in jeopardy and forces Clyde to do most of the work. He raps aggressively when Clyde leaves. Cameo by episode host Jon Hamm as a bank customer-turned-hostage. The ninth track on the Lonely Island's second album, Turtleneck & Chain.
What Was That?	Andy Samberg; Akiva Schaffer; Jorma Taccone	Akiva Schaffer	November 13, 2010	76	Having won a competition, a Model United Nations team present their thoughts on world history to the General Assembly at the U.N. headquarters in New York. The presentation is a rap (performed by Samberg portraying a student) that chastises the diplomats for past and present atrocities, such as the Holocaust and Darfur. Musical guest Arcade Fire appear as themselves.
Party at Mr. Bernard's	Andy Samberg; John Mulaney; John Solomon	Akiva Schaffer	December 4, 2010	77	A parody of the movie Weekend at Bernie's, in which two men (Hader and Samberg) find the corpse of their boss (played by episode host Robert De Niro) and attempt to make him look alive during a party at his beach house. In contrast to the film, the party guests find out right away that Mr. Bernard is dead. Chaos erupts as the men continue their scheme regardless, so they are arrested and put on trial. However, they are proven innocent by Mr. Bernard's video will, asking for the exact actions the two had taken as well as promoting them. The men then celebrate with everyone in the courtroom and Mr. Bernard's skeleton.
Stumblin'	Andy Samberg; Mike O'Brien; John Solomon	John Solomon; Akiva Schaffer	December 11, 2010	78	A parody of the Dolly Parton song 9 to 5, throughout which Andy Samberg and episode host Paul Rudd stumble throughout the city. Musical guest Paul McCartney and celebrity chef Mario Batali appear in the short as well.
I Just Had Sex	Andy Samberg; Akiva Schaffer; Jorma Taccone; Jerrod Bettis; Justin Franks	Akiva Schaffer	December 18, 2010	79	Andy Samberg, Jorma Taccone, and rapper Akon celebrate just having had sex with women (Blake Lively and Jessica Alba respectively), despite the fact that the women found the sex to be mediocre. Lonely Island's Akiva Schaffer shows up at various points during the video congratulating them on having sex, he also mouths the chorus at the end of the song. There is a brief cameo by John McEnroe. The first single off the Lonely Island's second album, Turtleneck and Chain.
Andy and Pee-wee's Night Out	Andy Samberg; John Solomon	Jorma Taccone; John Solomon	January 15, 2011	80	Samberg has some shots with none other than Pee-wee Herman (Paul Reubens). After beating Anderson Cooper (who appears as himself) over the head with a chair, Samberg and Pee-wee are caught by the police, to which they escape by hitting the officer with a chair. When they return to Samberg's apartment, they come to an intervention with Cooper (bandaged up from being hit in the face with a chair by Pee-wee and Samberg), Samberg's friends (Fred Armisen, Kristen Wiig, and Kenan Thompson), and Pee-wee's Playhouse friends Chairry, Pterri, and Conky, who plead with Andy and Pee-wee never to be friends again. Andy and Pee-wee reluctantly agree, and everybody celebrates the breakup with more shots.
The Creep	Andy Samberg; Akiva Schaffer; Jorma Taccone; Nicki Minaj; Scott Jung	Akiva Schaffer	January 29, 2011	81	The Lonely Island and Nicki Minaj pose as middle aged stalkers and rap about the latest dance craze (The Creep). John Waters also appears in the short. The second single from The Lonely Island's second album, Turtleneck & Chain.
The Roommate	Unknown	Unknown	February 5, 2011	82	A movie trailer parodying its namesake, in which a college student (Justin Bieber) believes his increasingly bizarre and obsessive roommate (Samberg) is planning to kill him.
Zach Looks for a New Assistant	Unknown	John Solomon	March 12, 2011	83	Zach Galifianakis interviews young children as possible candidates for being his assistant.
Laser Cats 6: The Musical!	Andy Samberg; Akiva Schaffer; Jorma Taccone	Akiva Schaffer; Jorma Taccone	April 2, 2011	84	Hader and Samberg again use a celebrity (Tom Hanks) to pitch a new Laser Cats film to Lorne Michaels; this time, a musical version which includes parodies of Cats and Spider-Man: Turn Off the Dark. It is revealed that Hader and Samberg have stolen Wilson the volleyball to blackmail Hanks. Episode host and musical guest Elton John portrays the villain and Carmelo Anthony plays a security guard.
Helen Mirren's Magic Bosom	Nasim Pedrad; Sarah Schneider; Heather Anne Campbell (original sketch); Andy Samberg; Akiva Schaffer; Jorma Taccone (final short)	Akiva Schaffer	April 9, 2011	85	Nasim wants to be inspired, so she finds Helen Mirren in her dressing room, where Pedrad dreams she is in "Helen Mirren's Titties", a place beyond space and time, and a sequence of shots involving happy things like two leaders shaking hands, flowers, etc.
Jack Sparrow	Andy Samberg; Akiva Schaffer; Jorma Taccone; Michael Woods	Akiva Schaffer	May 7, 2011	86	A music video for the song of the same name from The Lonely Island's Turtleneck and Chain album featuring Michael Bolton, who writes and performs a "big, sexy hook" for a new hip-hop track that The Lonely Island are recording. The hook's lyrics reveal Bolton's love for the Pirates of the Caribbean films, as well as Forrest Gump, Erin Brockovich, and Scarface.
3-Way (The Golden Rule)	Andy Samberg; Akiva Schaffer; Jorma Taccone; Justin Timberlake	Akiva Schaffer; Jorma Taccone	May 21, 2011	87	The "Dick in a Box" and "Motherlover" characters (Timberlake and Samberg) return in a song about how any sexual contact between them does not count as a homosexual act, as long as there is also a woman (Lady Gaga) involved. Susan Sarandon and Patricia Clarkson have cameos in the opening scene. Released as a standalone single in 2011 and featured on The Wack Album.

=== 2011–2012: Season 37 ===
A total of 14 SNL Digital Shorts were created for the 2011–2012 season.

Title	Written by	Directed by	Original airdate	Order	Description
Stomp	Andy Samberg; Jorma Taccone	Jorma Taccone	October 1, 2011	88	Two cops (Hader and Samberg) bored at work find music in everyday life (parody of Stomp). The entire precinct gets involved, but things turn aggressive when The Blue Man Group (played by Fred Armisen [who actually was a member before becoming an SNL cast member] and Paul Brittain) show up to play along until they get shot by everyone.
V-Necks	Andy Samberg; John Solomon	John Solomon	October 8, 2011	89	At a clothing store, a man (Samberg) is unconvinced that the V-neck shirt he is trying on is for him, despite his girlfriend's (Pedrad) assurances. But when the store owner (episode host Ben Stiller), wearing a deeper V enters, Samberg attempts to one-up him and asks a clerk for "something deeper" starting an impromptu V-neck battle, ending with the store clerk getting arrested for indecent exposure.
Drake Interview	Andy Samberg; John Solomon	John Solomon	October 15, 2011	90	Andy conducts several short and increasingly bizarre interviews with actor-singer Drake. Each segment follows a very literal theme as described by a title card (announced by Don Pardo) that appears onscreen before each interview. Some of the interviews included are: An Extremely Sarcastic Interview, A Racist Interview (which is cut short before Samberg can say anything racist), A Wordless Seduction, A Matching Sweaters Interview, and a Dark Interview.
Wish It Would Rain	Andy Samberg; Akiva Schaffer; Jorma Taccone	Jorma Taccone	November 12, 2011	91	A depressed singer (Samberg) sings about how his girlfriend left him for another man (Armisen). Samberg gestures towards the sky, hoping it will rain, but it doesn't (and gets urinated on by a man on the roof). Samberg begins complaining to the crew that he can't do the music video without rain, making insulting remarks about the producer (Vanessa Bayer) and his big-butted assistant (played by host Emma Stone)
Seducing Women Through Chess	Andy Samberg; John Solomon	John Solomon	November 19, 2011	92	In an early '80s-style instructional video, a nerdy man dressed like Carl Sagan (Samberg) shows viewers how to seduce women by playing chess, but the first two women (played by Nasim Pedrad and Abby Elliott) beat him. The instructor then changes the game to checkers and still gets beaten by a woman (Kristen Wiig). He tries Jenga, but ends up knocking the tower over. He tries eating glass, but ends up scaring the woman he's trying to seduce (played by special guest Olivia Wilde). The instructor (with his lips and mouth now bandaged up) gives up and lectures on how to hire a prostitute. The prostitute (played by episode host Jason Segel) offers sex to him for $5000, but the instructor only has $60. The instructor is stabbed and robbed of his money. Before dying, the prostitute comes back and beats him at chess.
Batman	Andy Samberg; John Solomon	John Solomon	December 3, 2011	93	Commissioner Gordon (Steve Buscemi) keeps getting stalked by Batman (Samberg). Paul Brittain and Kristen Wiig appears as Aquaman and the Riddler respectively.
Best Friends	Andy Samberg; Jorma Taccone	Jorma Taccone	December 10, 2011	94	Katy Perry and Samberg become best friends, then meet up with a "handsome drug addict" (Matt Damon) and "brilliant lunatic" (Val Kilmer) who want to be best friends too. Perry and Samberg become more and more frightened until Perry abandons the three when the drug addict shoots himself during a game of Russian roulette. The lunatic then builds a time machine, retrieving two cavemen, Marilyn Monroe (played by Nasim Pedrad), Amelia Earhart (played by Vanessa Bayer), Abraham Lincoln (played by John Solomon), and Julius Caesar from the past, who, along with Samberg, the lunatic, and the lunatic's "failed bird-man experiment" (who briefly left the duo to have sex with a white girl at the mall) wish the audience a merry Christmas and a Happy New Year.
Convoluted Jerry	Unknown	Unknown	January 7, 2012	95	A fake commercial for a CD collection featuring Convoluted Jerry (Andy Samberg), a singer whose lyrics are wordy and confusing, with songs including "Quit not Being My Lover," "Backwards Day" and "Jerry Explains the Movie Inception". Host Charles Barkley guest stars as Marvin "Gay" Jackson, who sings a duet with Convoluted Jerry.
Afros	Andy Samberg; Jorma Taccone; John Solomon	Jorma Taccone; John Solomon	March 3, 2012	96	A man (Samberg) and woman (Wiig) dressed in '70s-style clothing declare their love for each other in song. As the camera pulls back we can see that they are connected by their shared enormous afro. An unexplained man in janitor's clothing (Kenan Thompson) appears in between every verse and plays one riff on a strange instrument such as conch shell or didgeridoo. When the camera has pulled all the way back, revealing the full, massive afro, the couple invites the viewer to come to their wedding, whereupon the video is revealed to be a Save the Date. RSVP options "Yes" and "No" appear. "No" is clicked.
Tennis Balls	Andy Samberg	Jake Szymanski	March 10, 2012	97	To test the effects of stress on the human heart, a man (Jonah Hill) is hit repeatedly in the testicles by tennis balls fired from a tennis ball machine. Things get more bizarre as he continues to get hit even though the machine is turned off. A ghost hunter (Kenan Thompson) reveals to the host of Science Finders (Andy Samberg) that a ghost (Taran Killam) is the one hurling balls at the man. The man flatlines and a doctor (Fred Armisen) uses hits to the groin to revive the man.
Laser Cats 7	Andy Samberg; Jorma Taccone	Jorma Taccone	April 14, 2012	98	Despite Lorne Michaels' objections, Hader and Samberg show him the latest Laser Cats short – this time directed by Steven Spielberg (appearing as both himself and a "Hitchcockian" cameo in the short), which contains many references to his films, including E.T. the Extra-Terrestrial, Close Encounters of the Third Kind, and Raiders of the Lost Ark. Host Josh Brolin appears as a "Space Nazi."
Gotye Backstage	Andy Samberg; Taran Killam	Jake Szymanski	April 14, 2012	99	Samberg and Taran Killam visit Gotye in his dressing room, then stalk him by appearing in nothing but body paint and black wigs (as seen in the "Somebody That I Used To Know" music video).
100th Digital Short	Andy Samberg; Akiva Schaffer; Jorma Taccone	Jorma Taccone	May 12, 2012	100	The Lonely Island celebrate their 100th Digital Short by revisiting many digital short favorite characters (Shy Ronnie, Dennis the Drug Addict, Michelle the Body Fuzion Lady, The "Dick in a Box" singers, etc.), clips from previous Digital Shorts, and fresh footage from numerous celebrities, including: Justin Bieber (who is standing in for Akiva Schaffer and was tricked into appearing in this short), Julian Casablancas (from the "Boombox" Digital Short), Natalie Portman, Michael Bolton as Captain Jack Sparrow, Jon Hamm as Sergio (the shirtless saxophone player), Justin Timberlake (as one half of the "Dick in a Box" singers), Lorne Michaels, Usher, and Will Ferrell (who congratulates himself on his own popular recurring SNL sketches, such as the Spartan Cheerleaders, Harry Caray, and Celebrity Jeopardy).
Lazy Sunday 2	Andy Samberg; Akiva Schaffer; Jorma Taccone; Chris Parnell	Jorma Taccone	May 19, 2012	101	Samberg and Parnell do another "Lazy Sunday" rap for Sister Act: The Musical.

=== 2013–present: Additional shorts ===
After Andy Samberg's departure, the digital shorts reappeared over the years. Two of them appeared in the Season 39 finale which Samberg hosted.

Season	Title	Written by	Directed by	Music produced by	Original airdate	Order	Description
38	YOLO	The Lonely Island; Rhiannon Bryan; Rhydian Davies; Khari Cain	The Lonely Island	Needlz	January 26, 2013	102	The Lonely Island, Adam Levine, and Kendrick Lamar sing about the virtues of staying safe in daily life (flipping the intended meaning of YOLO with "You Ought to Look Out"), and become increasingly paranoid of everything. Danny McBride cameos as a man attempting to do cocaine in a nightclub. The second single from The Lonely Island's third album, The Wack Album.
39	When Will The Bass Drop?	The Lonely Island; Jonathan Smith; Sam Fishman	Matt Villines & Oz Rodriguez	SAM F	May 17, 2014	103	In a parody of stereotypical electronic dance music performers, the DJ Davvincii (Samberg) performs a number of unrelated activities rather than actually mixing music. Lil Jon and the entire Season 39 cast also appear.
39	Hugs	The Lonely Island; Pharrell Williams; Nathan Payton	The Lonely Island	Tommy Hittz	May 17, 2014	104	Samberg, Jorma Taccone, and Pharrell sing about how their hugs are the best but they won't lead to any kind of romantic commitment. Tatiana Maslany and Maya Rudolph (as Oprah Winfrey) make cameo appearances, as does Akiva Schaffer (who does not have any vocals on this track). This video was included on the DVD accompanying The Lonely Island's third album, The Wack Album.
SE	That's When You Break	The Lonely Island	Akiva Schaffer; Jake Szymanski		February 15, 2015	105	Samberg and Adam Sandler sing about times when people broke character on the show. Chris Parnell and Bill Hader also appear. This short was written and produced for the SNL 40th Anniversary Special.
41	Finest Girl (Bin Laden Song)	The Lonely Island; Michael Woods; Kevin White; Nash Overstreet	Akiva Schaffer; Jorma Taccone	Michael Woods; Kevin White; Nash Overstreet; Greg Kurstin	May 21, 2016	106	Conner4real (Samberg) sings about hooking up with a girl (Vanessa Bayer) who used the assassination of Osama bin Laden (episode host Fred Armisen) as an example of the kind of sex she wanted to have. Cast member Jay Pharoah also makes a cameo appearance as Barack Obama. From the soundtrack for The Lonely Island's feature film, Popstar: Never Stop Never Stopping.
43	Natalie's Rap 2	The Lonely Island; Asa Taccone; JMIKE	Paul Briganti	JMIKE	February 3, 2018	107	A sequel to the original Natalie's Rap from Season 31, Natalie Portman is interviewed by Beck Bennett, to which she responds with a rap about motherhood and the Star Wars prequels (holding Alex Moffat at gunpoint while dressed as her character Padmé Amidala). At the end, she impales Bennett's head with a Time's Up pin and throws him out of the window. Andy Samberg appears as his character from the first installment, Carl, with his scenes filmed in Los Angeles outside the ArcLight Hollywood. The day after the episode aired, The Lonely Island confirmed that they wrote the sketch.
50	Sushi Glory Hole	The Lonely Island	Mike Diva; Akiva Schaffer	DJ Nu-Mark	October 5, 2024	108	Two men (Samberg and Schaffer) pitch their newest invention: a bathroom stall glory hole through which you are served high-grade sushi.
50	Here I Go	The Lonely Island	Mike Diva	Asa Taccone	November 16, 2024	109	A man (Samberg) and his wife (Charli XCX) sing about the joys of calling the police on their white neighbors.
SE	Anxiety	Mike Diva; Andy Samberg	Mike Diva	Asa Taccone; Mike Diva	February 16, 2025	110	When Bowen Yang doesn't want to attend the SNL anniversary special because of his anxiety, Andy Samberg takes him through the history of the show to show that virtually every cast member had anxiety and irritable bowel syndrome. Sarah Sherman, Chris Parnell, Ana Gasteyer, Molly Shannon, Will Forte, Taran Killam, Beck Bennett, James Austin Johnson, Kyle Mooney, and Kenan Thompson also appear. This short was written and produced for the SNL 50th Anniversary Special, and was branded as "An SNL 50 Digital Short"

== Dress rehearsal shorts ==
These shorts were filmed and shown to the studio audience during the weekly SNL dress rehearsal, but were not included in the live show and did not air.

Title	Written by	Directed by	Date Intended to Air	Description
Handlebar and Lobster Claw	Seth Meyers	Unknown	April 8, 2006	In a parody of 1970s police shows, a theme song (by The Go! Team) introduces two police officers, Handlebar (Meyers) who has a handlebar moustache and Lobster Claw (Samberg) who has lobster claws for hands, as well as The Chief (Banderas). The sketch cuts to the two police officers at a diner, where Handlebar reads a newspaper with a wanted headline and Lobster Claw struggles to eat his meal. The wanted ninja from the newspaper (Taccone) walks in to the diner and sits at a table. After an intense staredown between Handlebar and the ninja, Handlebar provides Lobster Claw with a straw. First shown during the Antonio Banderas dress rehearsal. It was shown again during the remaining rehearsals of the 2005–2006 season.
Gawker Hopefuls	Unknown	Unknown	October 28, 2006	Samberg and Armisen attempt to get noticed by Gawker.com, paparazzi, and Us Weekly. They even go to the Us Weekly and Gawker offices. It was only shown during the Hugh Laurie dress rehearsal.
The Sun's Day Off	Unknown	Unknown	September 27, 2008	An animated short. Samberg plays a sun who tries to brighten up Anna Faris, Bill Hader, and Will Forte's days. Only shown in the Faris dress rehearsal.
Guys In Sunglasses Lookin' Dope	Unknown	Unknown	April 11, 2009	Short features close-ups of male castmembers, Jason Sudeikis, Fred Armisen, Will Forte, Kenan Thompson and Zac Efron (host) posing in their designer shades. They keep proclaiming they're lookin dope, camera cuts to Andy who is posing in some cheap shades. Shown to audiences only during the Efron dress rehearsal.
Will's Secret Weapon	Unknown	Unknown	May 16, 2009	Will Ferrell has a puppet that looks like a kangaroo and keeps attacking cast members like Bobby Moynihan, Kenan Thompson and Andy Samberg. Shown only during the Ferrell dress rehearsal.
Traveling With PJ	Unknown	Unknown	October 17, 2009	Kristen Wiig visits New York City. At first, she's impressed but in the end realizes that she misses her hometown. Shown during the Gerard Butler and James Franco dress rehearsals.

== Other Lonely Island shorts on SNL ==
Produced by The Lonely Island, and/or labeled Digital Shorts on official YouTube postings, these shorts aired on an SNL episode but not with the official "An SNL Digital Short" title card. As with the Digital Shorts, these are directed by Akiva Schaffer. However, according to The Lonely Island's official website, the majority of the MacGruber shorts are directed by Jorma Taccone.

Title	Written by	Directed by	Original airdate	Description
An SNL Movie Trailer Re-Cut: Apocalypto	Matt Murray	Akiva Schaffer	December 9, 2006	The trailer for Mel Gibson's film Apocalypto is newly subtitled, implying that the Jews destroyed the Maya civilization, in reference to Gibson's anti-semitic remarks in 2006.
MacGruber (Parts 1, 2, and 3)	Will Forte; Jorma Taccone; John Solomon	Jorma Taccone	January 20, 2007	In three parodies of MacGyver, the titular hero (Forte) demands odd objects of his disgusted sidekicks (Jeremy Piven, Rudolph) in his attempts to stop catastrophic events that are mere seconds away. The episodes invariably end with his failure to stop the event.
Sloths!	Unknown	Jorma Taccone	February 10, 2007	A Staten Island Zoo worker (Wiig) introduces Staten Island Tech High School student's crude and vile documentary on sloths before previewing it herself.
United Way	Seth Meyers; Akiva Schaffer	Akiva Schaffer	March 24, 2007	Super Bowl MVP Peyton Manning takes time out to be a mentor to kids, but ends up being physically, mentally, and verbally abusive to them (a parody of his public service announcements for the United Way during 2001–05).
MacGruber 2	Will Forte; Jorma Taccone; John Solomon	Jorma Taccone	May 12, 2007	In three more segments, the titular hero (Forte), after 15 years of sobriety, begins drinking just as his sidekicks (Molly Shannon, Rudolph) need his bomb-defusing skills most. MacGruber's behavior evolves into a parody of David Hasselhoff's hangover video.
MacGruber 3	Will Forte; Jorma Taccone; John Solomon	Jorma Taccone	October 6, 2007	In three more segments, the titular hero (Forte) becomes obsessed with his recent plastic surgeries just as his sidekicks (Seth Rogen, Rudolph) need his bomb-defusing skills most.
Virgania Horsen's Hot Air Balloon Rides	Unknown	Akiva Schaffer	February 23, 2008; February 14, 2009	A fake commercial about a woman (Kristen Wiig) offering free hot air balloon rides to combat the long lines and intrusive searches at airports. There was a 2nd part to this commercial, in which Horsen flies over New York and Montreal, that was cut for time from the original airing. Both parts aired during Alec Baldwin's 2008–2009 appearance.
MacGruber 4	Will Forte; Jorma Taccone; John Solomon	John Solomon	March 15, 2008	MacGruber (Forte) feels insecure when his assistant (Jonah Hill) says that he cannot do his job when he and Vicky (Wiig) need his bomb-defusing skills the most. Only two segments aired. In the third segment (which is available on some video websites), Hader appears as MacGruber's life coach.
MacGruber 5	Will Forte; Jorma Taccone; John Solomon	John Solomon	May 10, 2008	MacGruber and his son, Merrill (Shia LaBeouf), team up together. However, in the process of escaping, Merrill inadvertently confesses that he's gay (by showing anal lubricant, a vibrating dildo, and his boyfriend Scott (Samberg) showing up) leaving MacGruber to make him straight again by reciting Bible verses and forcing him to kiss Vicky (Wiig).
MacGruber 6	Will Forte; Jorma Taccone; John Solomon	Jorma Taccone	October 18, 2008	MacGruber discovers he lost all his money in the stock market and seeks desperate ways for cash just as his sidekicks (Josh Brolin, Wiig) need his bomb-defusing skills most.
Giraffes!!	Jorma Taccone	Jorma Taccone	November 1, 2008	A sequel to the "Sloths" video, only with Jason Sudeikis as the head of the Staten Island Zoo instead of Kristen Wiig. The same students create a video that proclaims giraffes are from outer space and will destroy mankind.
MacGruber (Pepsi commercials)	Will Forte; Jorma Taccone; John Solomon	Jorma Taccone	January 31, 2009	MacGruber is helped by MacGyver (Richard Dean Anderson) and keeps trying to promote Pepsi, changing his name to "Pepsuber" and eventually replaces every word in his sentences with the word "Pepsi". These shorts were paid for by Pepsi as advertisements; as a result they aired during commercial breaks, not as part of the show itself, and did not air at all on the Canadian simsub on Global. The second of the three shorts was replayed as an ad during Super Bowl XLIII the next day.
MacGruber 7	Will Forte; Jorma Taccone; John Solomon	Jorma Taccone	March 7, 2009	MacGruber is once again joined by MacGyver (Richard Dean Anderson), who reveals that he's MacGruber's long-lost father (MacGruber's full name is actually "MacGruber MacGyver"), who left MacGruber's mother (Abby Elliott) for a stripper.
An SNL Movie Trailer Re-Cut: Palin 2012	Unknown	John Solomon; Colin Jost	November 21, 2009	In another installment of An SNL Movie Trailer Re-Cut, the trailer for the disaster film 2012 is changed into a political horror about Sarah Palin's possible election as U.S. President that year.
MacGruber 8	Will Forte; Jorma Taccone; John Solomon	Jorma Taccone	January 9, 2010	When MacGruber gets an African-American sidekick (Charles Barkley), he inadvertently reveals that he is a racist.
MacGruber 9	Will Forte; Jorma Taccone; John Solomon	Jorma Taccone	May 8, 2010	MacGruber works with his grandma (Betty White), who embarrasses him by telling Vicki stories about his past.
Beastly	Unknown	Unknown	March 5, 2011	A handsome high school student obsessed with his good looks (Samberg, portraying Gene Hackman as the protagonist) is cursed by a witch (Nasim Pedrad), who transforms him into the same nerd that Samberg played in the previous Digital Short The Roommate. Having been informed by the witch that he has one year to find someone to love him "or stay like this forever", he falls in love with a girl (played by episode host Miley Cyrus) who seemingly attempts to find his inner beauty, albeit unsuccessfully. The second consecutive Digital Short to parody a then-recent Hollywood release, it appears to be the origin story for The Roommate character, implying that he was unable to break the witch's curse.

== Reception ==
The short "Lazy Sunday", which aired on December 17, 2005, was viewed more than five million times on YouTube alone before it was removed due to copyright infringement. In late 2006, however, NBC began uploading SNL shorts on YouTube themselves. As of October 6, 2023, the upload currently available on the show's YouTube channel has received over four million views.

The short "Dick in a Box", which aired on December 16, 2006, was viewed more than 28 million times on YouTube. The uncensored version was available on YouTube with a special warning, stating that the sketch contained explicit language that was censored from the television version. The song also won a Creative Arts Emmy Award in 2007 for Outstanding Original Music and Lyrics. Songs from five other Digital Shorts received Emmy nominations for Outstanding Original Music and Lyrics: "Motherlover" in 2009; "Shy Ronnie" in 2010; and "I Just Had Sex", "Jack Sparrow", and "3-Way (The Golden Rule)" in 2011.

== The Shooting ==
Samberg in The Shooting.

The Shooting, also known as Dear Sister, was broadcast during an episode aired April 14, 2007. The short satirizes the final scene of The O.C.'s second-season finale. The Lonely Island had the idea for the short before even being hired by Saturday Night Live and had previously recorded their own version of the short. The NBC network, which usually uploads Saturday Night Live digital shorts to its official site and YouTube channel immediately following broadcast, did not do so for Dear Sister due to music clearance issues. It nevertheless became immensely popular on YouTube with artists making parodies, re-enactments and other references.

=== Plot ===
Keith (Bill Hader) writes a letter to his sister, as Dave (Andy Samberg) asks what he is doing. As Keith responds, explaining he has not seen his sister in a long time, Dave suddenly and inexplicably shoots him. In the following overly dramatic, slow-motion death overdubbed by a cue of "Hide and Seek" by Imogen Heap, Dave is seen visibly shaken as Keith, in shock, collapses. As Dave gathers his bearings, Keith suddenly shoots him, having recovered from his injury long enough to exact his revenge to the same music cue.

Another man, Eric (Shia LaBeouf), enters looking for them. Dave comes back to life to shoot Eric in the stomach; he collapses, once again to the same music. The sister herself (Kristen Wiig) enters the scene, and begins to read the letter, until she too is shot several times by each of the three men on the ground, with the music cue restarting with every shot.

The short ends with two police officers (Jason Sudeikis and Fred Armisen) observing the crime scene. One (Armisen) finds the letter, left on the table near the brother's body, and begins to read. The letter is revealed to be a prediction of each shooting, in detail, and ends claiming that two police officers will come across the letter and then shoot each other after reading it. While the reading officer laughs it off, his partner turns and shoots him, as the reading officer shoots his partner as well, to overlapping "Hide and Seek" cues.

=== Controversy ===
On April 16, 2007, two days following the initial air date of the sketch, the Virginia Tech shooting occurred and became the deadliest school shooting in modern U.S. history at the time. Noam Cohen of The New York Times criticized fans of the short for insensitivity when they continued to make YouTube videos based on it.
