= The Lonely Island and Seth Meyers Podcast =

American comedy rewatch podcast

- Podcast artwork
- Genre: Rewatch; comedy
- Country of origin: United States
- Language: American English

Cast and voices
- Hosted by: Andy Samberg; Akiva Schaffer; Jorma Taccone; Seth Meyers

Music
- Theme music composed by: Greg Chun

Production
- Production: Rabbit Grin Productions
- Length: 41-72 minutes

Technical specifications
- Audio format: MP3

Publication
- Original release: April 8, 2024 – present
- Updates: Weekly

Related
- Related shows: Saturday Night Live

The Lonely Island and Seth Meyers Podcast is an ongoing American rewatch podcast hosted by Andy Samberg, Akiva Schaffer, Jorma Taccone, and Seth Meyers. In each episode, the hosts discuss the origins and legacy of an SNL Digital Short. The first episode was released on April 8, 2024, and has since featured numerous guests including Jonah Hill, Jake Tapper, Lin Manuel Miranda, Questlove and Jon Hamm as well as SNL's former writers and cast members who worked on these sketches, such as Mike O'Brien, Will Forte, John Solomon, Amy Poehler, Bill Hader, Fred Armisen, Maya Rudolph and Michael Schur.

== Format ==
Each week, Samberg, Schaffer, Taccone, and Meyers discuss the production process and the legacy of a digital short, in addition to having broader discussions about the Saturday Night Live episode in which the short appears. Some episodes feature "Seth's Corner", a segment where Meyers, then head writer of the show, will discuss sketches he wrote and other memories of that week.

Episodes unrelated to digital shorts have also been released. Subjects covered include movies involving Lonely Island members, albums produced by the trio, and listener Q&As.

The show heavily features running gags, with some fans having created reference guides (referred to in the podcast as the "AlmaNick") dedicated to cataloging terms used by the hosts.

Some frequently used terms include:

Term	Definition
"The Bee"	Refers to the New York Times Spelling Bee.
"Burrito Brain"	Being driven crazy due to excessive burrito consumption.
"Criterion"	The designation given to a high quality short. A reference to The Criterion Collection.
"Hauser"	Someone who dislikes the podcast. A reference to Douglas Quaid's alter ego in Total Recall.
"Hit us in the tittus"	A call for listeners to leave their opinions in the YouTube comment sections.
"J.A.W.B"	A body similar to that of Jeremy Allen White.
"Quaid/Quaid Army"	A fan/fans of the podcast. A reference to the protagonist of the film Total Recall portrayed by Arnold Schwarzenegger.
"Quibi"	Refers to the "Queen Bee" rank in the New York Times Spelling Bee.
"Qump"	A "Quaid-bump", or the increase in a short's view count after having been featured on the podcast.
"Righteous Kill"	The response phrase used by the hosts after someone identifies themselves as being part of the "Quaid Army". A reference to the 2008 film Righteous Kill.

== Reception ==
The podcast has received positive reviews from critics. Ethan Anderson, writing for SlashFilm, described the podcast as a "must listen" for fans of Saturday Night Live. In a year end ranking list published by HuffPost, the podcast was described as feeling "like reconnecting with an old friend and picking up right where you left off".Time ranked it as the second best podcast of 2024.

The series has received two consecutive Webby Awards for "Best Co-Hosts: People's Voice Winner".

== Episodes ==
No.	Title	Original release date
1	"The Lonely Island Beginnings"	April 8, 2024
2	"Lettuce"	April 15, 2024
3	"Lazy Sunday"	April 17, 2024
4	"Young Chuck Norris"	April 22, 2024
5	"The Tangent and Close Talkers"	April 29, 2024
6	"Natalie's Rap"	May 6, 2024
7	"Family Trips: Andy Samberg had a Closet for a Room"	May 8, 2024
Promotional episode for Meyers' Family Trips podcast; co-hosted by Josh Meyers
8	"Doppleganger"	May 13, 2024
9	"Laser Cats!"	May 20, 2024
10	"My Testicles & Peyote"	May 27, 2024
11	"Andy Walking"	June 3, 2024
12	"Hot Rod"	June 10, 2024
13	"Hot Rod (Again)"	June 17, 2024
14	"Cubicle Fight"	June 24, 2024
15	"Harpoon Man"	July 1, 2024
16	"Dick in a Box"	July 8, 2024
17	"Laser Cats! 2"	July 15, 2024
18	"Business Meeting, Nurse Nancy, and Andy Popping Into Frame"	July 22, 2024
19	"The MacGruber Episode"	July 29, 2024
Guest hosts: Will Forte and John Solomon
20	"United Way Ad"	August 5, 2024
21	"Dear Sister"	August 12, 2024
22	"Roy Rules"	August 12, 2024
23	"Talking Dog"	August 26, 2024
24	"Iran So Far Away"	September 2, 2024
25	"People Getting Punched Just Before Eating"	September 9, 2024
26	"Brian Diaries"	September 16, 2024
27	"Listener Q&A #1"	September 23, 2024
28	"Strike Episode!"	September 23, 2024
–	"A Special Message From The Lonely Island and Seth Meyers"	September 30, 2024
Episode cancelled due to filming of "Sushi Glory Hole"
29	"Sushi Glory Hole"	October 7, 2024
30	"Grandkids in the Movies"	October 14, 2024
31	"The Mirror"	October 28, 2024
32	"Hero Song"	November 4, 2024
33	"Andy's Dad"	November 11, 2024
34	"Laser Cats! 3D"	November 18, 2024
35	"Here I Go"	November 25, 2024
36	"Daiquiri Girl"	December 2, 2024
37	"The Best Look in the World"	December 9, 2024
38	"Japanese Office"	December 16, 2024
39	"The Criterion Episode"	December 23, 2024
Guest hosts: Jake Tapper, Michael Schur, and Alan Sepinwall
40	"Listener Q&A Episode 2"	December 30, 2024
41	"Listener Q&A Episode 3"	January 6, 2025
–	"A Message From Seth: No Episode This Week"	January 13, 2025
Recording cancelled due to the 2025 Palisades Fire
42	"Family Trips: Jorma Taccone Wanted to Ride in a Limosine"	January 20, 2025
Promotional episode for Meyers' Family Trips podcast; co-hosted by Josh Meyers
43	"Breaking Down Mike O'Brien's SNL Digital Shorts"	January 27, 2025
Guest host: Mike O'Brien
44	"Incredibad Part 1"	February 3, 2025
45	"Incredibad Part 2"	February 10, 2025
46	"Space Olympics"	February 17, 2025
47	"Listener Q&A Episode 4"	February 24, 2025
48	"The SNL 50th Recap"	February 28, 2025
49	"Hey!, Extreme Challenge, and Jam the Vote"	March 3, 2025
50	"Ras Trent"	March 11, 2025
51	"The Jon Hamm Episode"	March 18, 2025
52	"Everyone's a Critic"	March 25, 2025
53	"Jizz in My Pants and Virgania Horsen's Pony Express"	April 1, 2025
54	"Listener Q&A Episode 5"	April 8, 2025
55	"MacGruber: Remembering Val Kilmer"	April 16, 2025
Guest hosts: Will Forte and John Solomon
56	"Listener Q&A Episode 6"	April 22, 2025
57	"Cookies w/ Amy Poehler"	April 30, 2025
Guest host: Amy Poehler
58	"Doogie Howser Theme"	May 7, 2025
59	"A Couple of Homies"	May 13, 2025
60	"Laser Cats! 4-ever"	May 20, 2025
61	"I'm on a Boat"	May 27, 2025
62	"Property of the Queen"	June 3, 2025
63	"Party Guys"	June 10, 2025
64	"Like a Boss"	June 17, 2025
65	"The Zac Efron Episode"	June 24, 2025
66	"The Lonely Island Beginnings (Repost)"	July 1, 2025
Re-release of episode #1
67	"Motherlover"	July 8, 2025
68	"My Secret Weapon & Mugless"	July 15, 2025
69	"Movie Awards"	July 22, 2025
70	"The Naked Gun: A Preview"	July 30, 2025
71	"The Date and Megan's Roommate"	August 5, 2025
72	"Listener Episode #1 (Repost)"	August 12, 2025
Re-release of episode #25
73	"Threw it on the Ground"	August 19, 2025
74	"Brenda and Shaun"	August 26, 2025
75	"Firelight (Taylor Swift)"	September 2, 2025
76	"Get Out!"	September 9, 2025
77	"Listener Q&A Episode 7"	September 16, 2025
78	"Two Worlds Collide"	September 23, 2025
79	"Shy Ronnie"	September 30, 2025
80	"Tizzle Wizzle Show"	October 7, 2025
81	"Booty Call"	October 14, 2025
82	"Laser Cats 5"	October 21, 2025
Guest host: Bill Hader
83	"The Curse"	October 28, 2025
Guest host: Jon Hamm
84	"Flags of the World"	November 4, 2025
85	"Zach Drops By the Set"	November 11, 2025
86	"Boombox"	November 18, 2025
87	"Jorm Thanks You"	November 25, 2025
Also released in video format; guest host: Dr. Shirvinda Wijesekera
88	"The Other Man"	December 2, 2025
89	"Listener Q&A Episode 8"	December 9, 2025
90	"Cherry Battle"	December 16, 2025
91	"Listener Q&A Episode 9"	December 23, 2025
92	"The Criterion Episode (2024 Re-release)"	December 30, 2025
Re-release of episode #39
93	"The 2025 Criterion Episode"	January 6, 2026
Guest hosts: Lin-Manuel Miranda and Questlove
94	"Golden Girls Theme"	January 13, 2026
95	"Listener Q&A Episode 10"	January 20, 2026
96	"Listener Q&A Episode 11 aka Snow Day"	January 28, 2026
97	"Great Day"	February 3, 2026
98	"Talkin' Ads/Turtleneck & Chain Part 1"	February 11, 2026
99	"Just 2 Guyz"	February 17, 2026
100	"Episode 100: Turtleneck & Chain Part 2"	February 24, 2026
101	"Episode (Channel) 101"	March 3, 2026
102	"The Heist & Ka-Blamo!"	March 10, 2026
103	"The Taccones Live at SXSW"	March 18, 2026
104	"Boogerman Part 1&2"	March 26, 2026
105	"Rescue Dog 3D & Relaxation Therapy"	April 2, 2026
106	"I Broke My Arm"	April 8, 2026
107	"Shy Ronnie 2: Ronnie & Clyde"	April 16, 2026
108	"Over Your Dead Body"	April 22, 2026
109	"Listener Q&A Episode 12"	April 29, 2026
110	"What Was That?"	May 5, 2026
111	"We Like Sportz"	May 13, 2026
112	"Episode 112 (Note: Retroactively referred to as "The Bullshit List")"	May 20, 2026
113	"Party at Mr. Bernard’s"	May 27, 2026
114	"A Sleepy Lil Ep"	June 3, 2026
115	"Stumblin'"	June 10, 2026
116	"I Just Had Sex (Part 1)"	June 18, 2026
117	"I Just Had Sex (Part 2)"	June 24, 2026
118	"Listener Q&A #13"	June 30, 2026
119	"Popstar 10th Anniversary Q&A"	July 7, 2026
120	"Andy and Pee-wee's Night Out"	July 14, 2026
121	"Listener Q&A #14"	July 22, 2026
122	"Nintendo Cartoon Hour"	July 29, 2026
123	"The Creep"	August 5, 2026
124	"The Roommate"	August 11, 2026
125	"Beastly"	August 18, 2026
126	"Turtleneck & Chain Part 3"	August 26, 2026
127	"Turtleneck & Chain Part 4: Trouble on Dookie Island"	September 3, 2026
128	"Turtleneck & Chain Part 5: Japan"	September 9, 2026
129	"Zach Looks for a New Assistant"	September 17, 2026
130	"After Party"	September 23, 2026
131	"Snuff Box: F**k You"	October 1, 2026
132	"Laser Cats 6: The Musical!"	October 8, 2026
133	"We'll Kill U"	October 16, 2026
134	"The Helen Mirren Episode"	October 22, 2026
135	"Bill Hader"	October 29, 2026
Guest Host: Bill Hader
136	"Seth, You're A Bad Boy"	November 6, 2026
137	"Helen Mirren's Magical Bosom"	November 13, 2026
138	"Jack Sparrow (JK Dennis Franz Butt Deep Dive)"	November 20, 2026

== See also ==
- SNL Digital Short
- List of film and television podcasts
- List of rewatch podcasts
