= Saturday Night Live in the 2000s: Time and Again =

Documentary television special

- Written by: Kenneth Bowser
- Directed by: Kenneth Bowser
- Music by: Dean Landon
- Country of origin: United States
- Original language: English

Production
- Producers: Declan Baldwin; Kenneth Bowser
- Cinematography: Teodoro Maniaci
- Editor: Jamie Kirkpatrick
- Running time: 120 minutes

Original release
- Network: NBC
- Release: April 15, 2010

Saturday Night Live in the 2000s: Time and Again is a two-hour documentary television special that showcases the years of Saturday Night Live from 2000 to 2009. It features interviews with the cast and crew from those years, and aired on NBC on April 15, 2010. It was nominated for a Primetime Emmy Award for Outstanding Nonfiction Special.

Topics discussed include Jimmy Fallon and Tina Fey as the new Weekend Update anchors after the departure of Colin Quinn, how SNL became popular for its spoofs on the 2000 United States presidential election, and how the show's humor survived the 9/11 attacks and the anthrax scare. Other topics discussed include Will Ferrell's departure at the end of season 27 and the search for a replacement cast member to play George W. Bush, Jimmy Fallon's departure from the show, coverage of the 2008 presidential election and Tina Fey's impersonation of Sarah Palin, the ascent of female cast members such as Amy Poehler, Tina Fey, and Kristen Wiig in what was traditionally seen as a male-dominated show, the hiring of Bill Hader and Andy Samberg, and SNL regaining its popularity with the Digital Shorts.

Fred Armisen, Alec Baldwin, Rachel Dratch, Abby Elliott, Jimmy Fallon, Steve Higgins, Will Ferrell, Tina Fey, Will Forte, Bill Hader, Darrell Hammond, Chris Kattan, Marci Klein, John McCain, Seth Meyers, Lorne Michaels, Tracy Morgan, Bobby Moynihan, Chris Parnell, Amy Poehler, Maya Rudolph, Andy Samberg, Horatio Sanz, Akiva Schaffer, Molly Shannon, Michael Shoemaker, Jason Sudeikis, Jorma Taccone, Kenan Thompson, Justin Timberlake, Christopher Walken and Kristen Wiig provided comments for the special.

== Other SNL specials ==
A special called The Women of Saturday Night Live was planned to air on NBC before the 2000s decade special. Instead, it would later air in November 2010, reuniting past female cast members. Additional "decade" specials were Live from New York: The First 5 Years of SNL, Saturday Night Live in the '80s: Lost and Found (2005), and Saturday Night Live in the '90s: Pop Culture Nation (2007). These highlighted past cast members and skits from the show and were interspersed with clips of musical guests.
