= Here I Go (The Lonely Island song) =

Song by The Lonely Island and Charli XCX
- Released: November 16, 2024
- Length: 3:01
- Songwriters: Andy Samberg, Asa Taccone, Akiva Schaffer
- Producer: Asa Taccone

The Lonely Island and Charli XCX singles chronology
"Sushi Glory Hole" (2024)	"Here I Go" (2024)

"Here I Go" is a song and SNL Digital Short by American comedy troupe The Lonely Island and British singer Charli XCX. The song was written by Andy Samberg, Asa Taccone, and Akiva Schaffer, with production by Taccone. It was released on November 16, 2024, when it premiered on episode seven, season 50 of Saturday Night Live. Primarily performed by Andy Samberg and host Charli XCX, the song and accompanying music video follow the two as they each report their white neighbors for various petty crimes.

The song received praise from critics.

== Release and reception ==
The song first aired during the seventh episode of Saturday Night Live's 50th season.

Writing for Paste, Matt Mitchell praised the song and its production value. Mitchell added that it was better than the previous digital short, "Sushi Glory Hole".
