= Seth Meyers =

American comedian and TV host (born 1973)

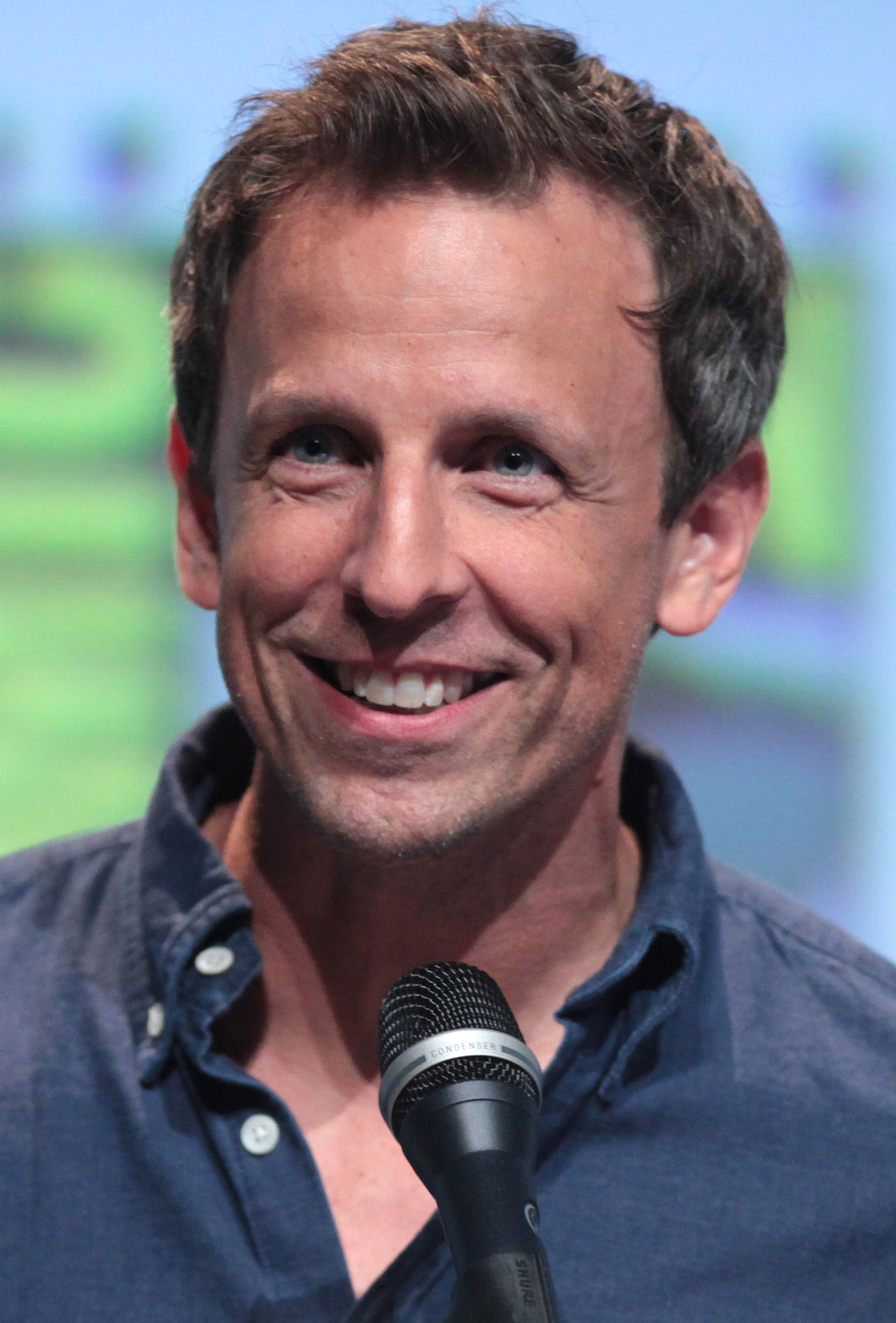
- Meyers in 2015
- Born: Seth Adam Meyers; December 28, 1973 (age 52); Evanston, Illinois, U.S.
- Education: Northwestern University (BA)
- Spouse: Alexi Ashe (m. 2013)
- Children: 3
- Relatives: Josh Meyers (brother)

Comedy career
- Years active: 2001–present
- Medium: Stand-up; television; film; books; podcast
- Genres: Political/news satire; improvisational comedy; sketch comedy; blue comedy; insult comedy; deadpan
- Subjects: American culture; American politics; current events; mass media/news media; pop culture

Seth Adam Meyers (/ˈmaɪərz/; born December 28, 1973) is an American comedian, television host, writer, actor, and producer. He has hosted Late Night with Seth Meyers, a late-night talk show on NBC since 2014. Prior to hosting Late Night, he was a cast member on NBC's sketch comedy series Saturday Night Live (SNL) from 2001 to 2014. He served as SNL's head writer, as well as an anchor of the news parody segment Weekend Update, from 2006 until his departure from the show.

== Early life and education ==
Meyers was born on December 28, 1973, in Evanston, Illinois. When he was four, his family moved to Okemos, Michigan, where he lived until he was ten. After that, he grew up in Bedford, New Hampshire. Seth's mother, Hilary Claire (née Olson), was a French teacher and his father, Laurence (Larry) Meyers Jr., worked in finance. At one point, his mother and fellow Saturday Night Live co-star John Mulaney's grandmother Carolyn Stanton performed together in a hospital benefit show in Marblehead, Massachusetts, called Pills A-Poppin' directed by Tony Award-winning choreographer Tommy Tune. Seth's younger brother, Josh Meyers, is an actor and comedian.

Meyers's paternal grandfather was an Ashkenazi Jewish immigrant from Kalvarija near Marijampolė in modern-day Lithuania. The rest of Seth's ancestry is Czech, Austrian, Croatian (from his paternal grandmother), Swedish (from his maternal grandfather), English, and German. Seth discovered on the show Finding Your Roots that his family's original surname, Trakianski, was changed by his great-grandfather to Meyers, after his own father Mejer Trakianski.

Meyers attended Edgewood Elementary School in Okemos. He graduated from Manchester High School West in Manchester, New Hampshire. He graduated in 1996 from Northwestern University in Evanston, where he was in the Phi Gamma Delta fraternity. His college roommate was fellow actor Peter Grosz. Meyers majored in film and television production. In 2011, he was the grand marshal for the school's homecoming parade. In 2016, he delivered the commencement address at Northwestern's graduation.

== Career ==
While a student at Northwestern University, Meyers began performing improv comedy as a member of the university's improv sketch group the Mee-Ow Show. He continued his career at ImprovOlympic with the group Preponderate as well as overseas as a cast member of Boom Chicago, an English language improv troupe based in Amsterdam, where his brother was also a cast member. Seth references living in Amsterdam during Late Night with Seth Meyers. When a Boom Chicago show he developed was mounted in Chicago, Saturday Night Live talent scouts noticed him and invited him to audition for SNL.

=== Saturday Night Live ===
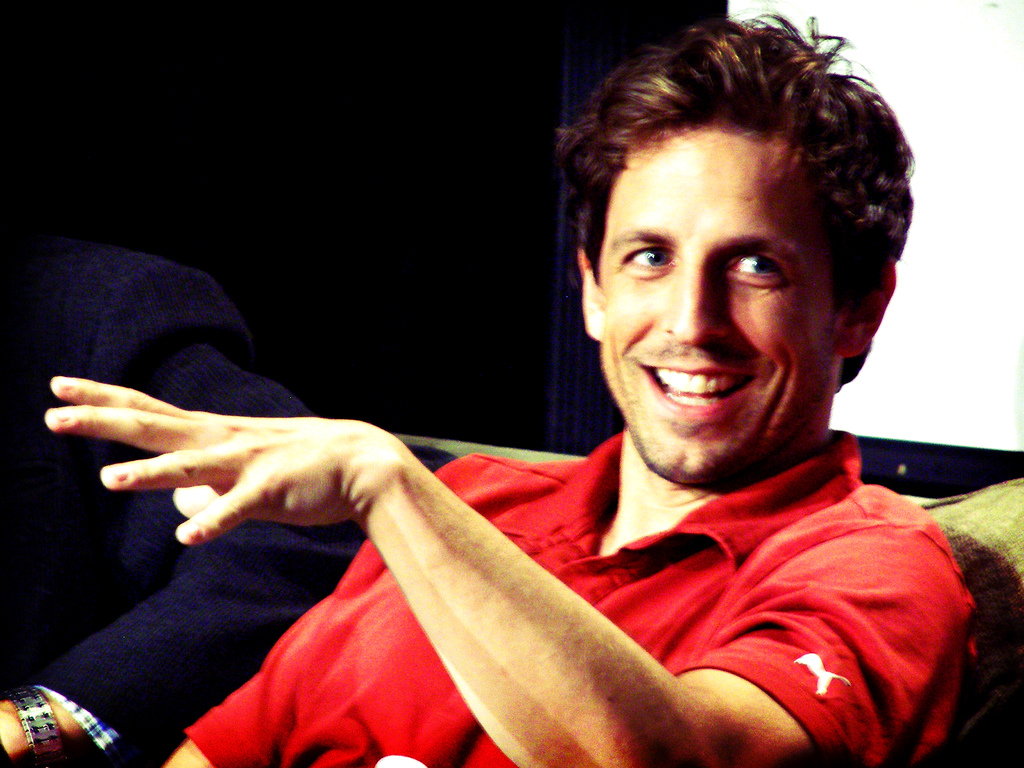
Meyers in 2007

Meyers joined the Saturday Night Live cast in 2001. In 2005, he was promoted to writing supervisor and, in January 2006, became a co-head writer, sharing the role with Tina Fey and Harper Steele. In 2004, Meyers auditioned to co-anchor Weekend Update with Fey, but Amy Poehler was selected. With Fey's departure, Meyers became head writer for the 2006–2007 season and assumed the role of Weekend Update co-anchor with Amy Poehler, although his cast contract was up around this time. He was asked to sign a contract agreeing to be just the head writer if he didn't get Weekend Update, but he declined to sign the contract, and waited to see what the plans for Update were. He considered leaving SNL altogether if he wasn't added to Update. After Poehler's departure, he was a solo anchor from 2008 to 2013. In fall 2009, Meyers co-anchored two episodes of Saturday Night Live Weekend Update Thursday with Poehler. In the 2013–2014 season, Cecily Strong joined Meyers as co-anchor until his mid-season departure.

On SNL, Meyers impersonated such figures as John Kerry, Michael Caine, Anderson Cooper, Carrot Top, Prince Charles, David Beckham, Ryan Seacrest, Sean Penn, Stone Phillips, Tobey Maguire, Peyton Manning, Ben Curtis (also known as the Dell Dude), Ty Pennington, Bill Cowher, Brian Williams, Nicollette Sheridan, Wade Robson, Donald Trump Jr., Tom Cruise, and Kevin Federline. His recurring characters included Zach Ricky, host of the kids' hidden camera show "Pranksters"; Nerod, the receptionist in the recurring sketch "Appalachian Emergency Room"; David Zinger, a scientist who often insults his fellow workers; DJ Johnathan Feinstein, the DJ on the webcam show "Jarett's Room"; Dan Needler, half of a married couple "that should be divorced," (opposite Amy Poehler); William Fitzpatrick, from the Irish talk show "Top o' the Morning," and Boston Powers (one of the comedians in the "Original Kings of Catchphrase Comedy" series). In the season 29 episode hosted by Lindsay Lohan, he portrayed Ron Weasley in a parody of Harry Potter.

Meyers received critical praise for his part in several iconic SNL sketches during his tenure. During the 2008 United States presidential election, he wrote the sketches for former SNL cast member Tina Fey, who returned as a guest star to impersonate Republican vice presidential candidate Sarah Palin. He created the famed if inaccurate phrase uttered by Fey's Palin, "I can see Russia from my house." While they were hosts on Weekend Update, Meyers and Poehler had a popular recurring bit, "Really!?! with Seth and Amy." Both hosts would take turns mocking people in the news, ending each point with a heavily sarcastic "Really!?!", which Rolling Stone writer Jon Blistein characterized as a "torrent of exasperation and bewilderment." Following Poehler's departure from the show in 2008, they revived the "Really!?!" segment several times when she returned as a guest. After Meyers left the show for his own talk show, Poehler made a surprise appearance on Late Night with Seth Meyers in June 2015 to join Meyers in mocking Sports Illustrated sportswriter Andy Benoit, after he disparaged women's sports as "not worth watching."

Additionally, the "Abe Lincoln" sketch Meyers wrote for Louis C.K., done in the style of his sitcom, Louie, and the Girls parody, starring Tina Fey as the new Albanian "girl", were praised by critics as among the best sketches Meyers contributed to SNL. Meyers supported and picketed during the 2007–08 Writers Guild of America strike. When interviewed, he said, "We all know how lucky we are to have the jobs we have. We're not asking for much. You have to change the rules because people are watching TV in a different way." Even so, he mentioned in interviews that he regretted missing much of the presidential election primary season.

Meyers performed in his final episode of SNL on February 1, 2014. Strong, Poehler, Bill Hader (in character as Stefon), Andy Samberg, and Fred Armisen (as former New York state governor David Paterson) joined him at the Weekend Update desk. Meyers returned to host the show in 2018 with Paul Simon as the musical guest.

=== Late Night ===
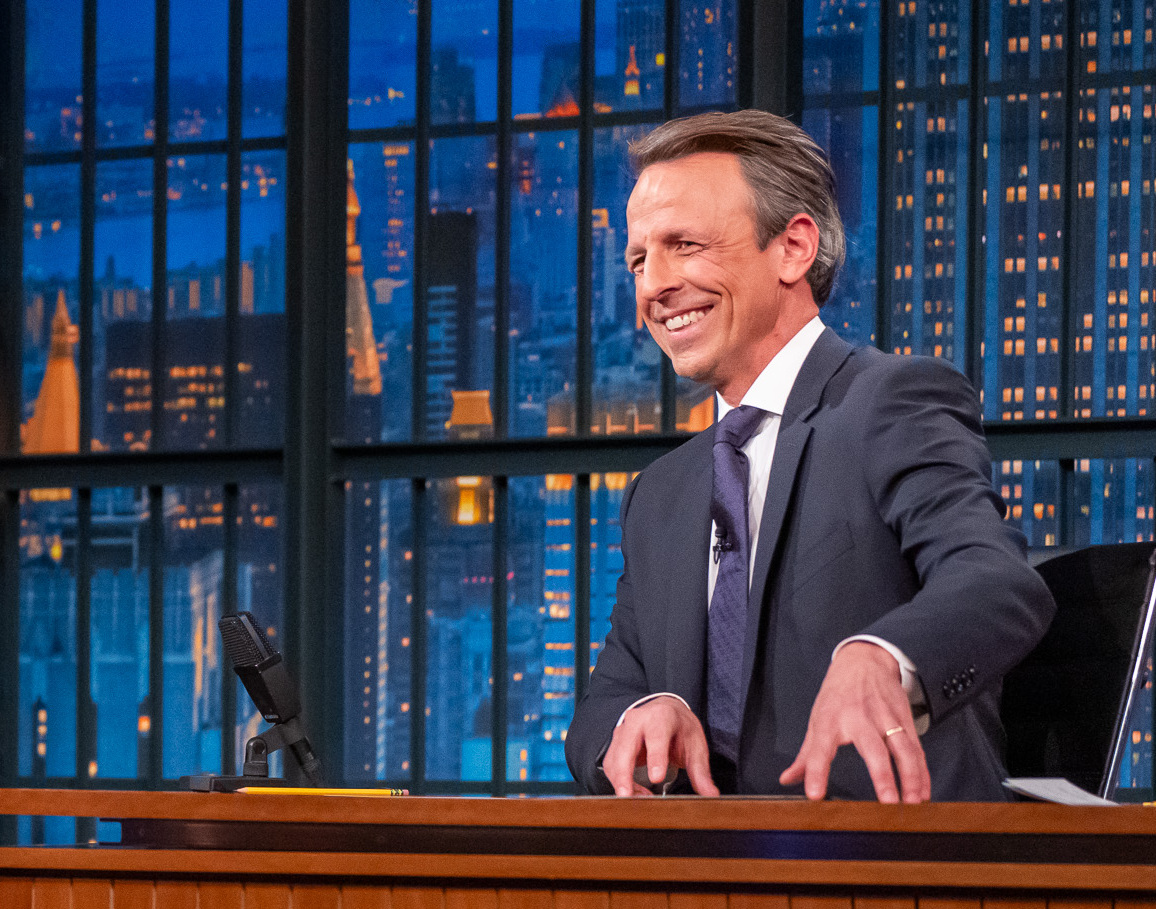
Meyers on the set of Late Night in 2024

NBC announced on May 12, 2013, that Meyers would be the new host of Late Night in 2014, succeeding Jimmy Fallon, as Fallon became host of The Tonight Show. Meyers assumed his role on Late Night on February 24, 2014, and his first guest was former SNL castmate and Weekend Update anchor Amy Poehler. Meyers announced February 10, 2014, that the bandleader for his house band "The 8G Band" would be his former SNL colleague Fred Armisen. More recently, he and his Sethmaker Shoemeyers Productions company signed an overall deal with NBCUniversal.

== Other pursuits ==
Meyers won the third season of Bravo's Celebrity Poker Showdown in 2004, and donated the $100,000 prize to the Boston-based Jimmy Fund. Meyers and SNL castmate Bill Hader penned a Spider-Man one-off entitled The Short Halloween. It was illustrated by Kevin Maguire and was published May 29, 2009. Benjamin Birdie of Comic Book Resources gave the work three and a half stars on a scale of five. Meyers, along with Mike Shoemaker of SNL, created an animated half-hour series titled The Awesomes, produced by Lorne Michaels's company, Broadway Video, that aired on Hulu beginning August 2013.

Seth and his brother Josh host a podcast called Family Trips with the Meyers Brothers; the first episode was released on June 27, 2023. From August 30 to October 10, Meyers hosted the comedy podcast Strike Force Five with Jimmy Fallon, Jimmy Kimmel, Stephen Colbert, and John Oliver to support their staff members out of work due to the 2023 Writers Guild of America strike. He also hosts The Lonely Island and Seth Meyers Podcast with The Lonely Island (Andy Samberg, Akiva Schaffer, and Jorma Taccone) which discusses the comedy group's SNL Digital Shorts.

=== Awards hosting ===
Meyers hosted the Webby Awards twice, in 2008 and 2009. In 2009, he hosted the Microsoft Company Meeting at Safeco Field in Seattle. He hosted the 2010 and 2011 ESPY Awards on ESPN. He was the keynote speaker at the 2011 White House Correspondents' Dinner. During his introductory remarks, he made a joke about Osama bin Laden's actions while in hiding; namely, that bin Laden was hosting his own afternoon television show on C-SPAN. Meyers was unaware at the time that US intelligence had indeed actually located bin Laden and the Navy SEALs planned an attack on his location for the very next day. In the same speech, he mocked Donald Trump (who was in attendance) for his attempts in finding then US president Barack Obama's birth certificate. He also mocked Trump's intention of running for president, which many later jokingly said was the reason for Trump's later candidacy in the 2016 U.S. presidential election. In 2014, Meyers hosted the 66th Primetime Emmy Awards. In 2018, he hosted the 75th Golden Globe Awards.

== Influences ==
Meyers says that his comedy influences are David Letterman, Monty Python, Steve Martin, Dennis Miller, Mel Brooks, Woody Allen, Richard Pryor, P. G. Wodehouse, Conan O'Brien, Norm Macdonald, and Jon Stewart.

== Personal life ==
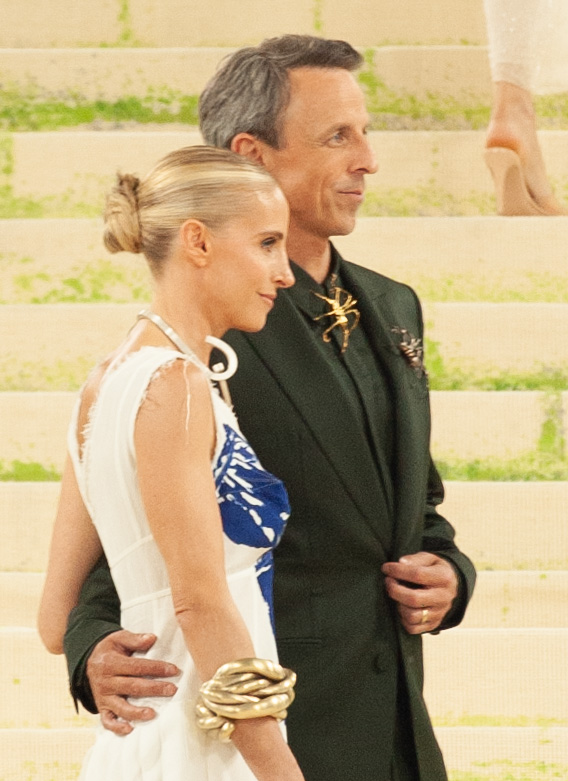
Alexi Ashe and Seth Meyers at the 2026 Met Gala

Meyers and his girlfriend of five years, attorney Alexi Ashe, were engaged in July 2013. They married in a Jewish wedding on September 1, 2013, on Martha's Vineyard. Their first son was born at Lenox Hill Hospital, in Manhattan, New York City, on March 27, 2016. On April 8, 2018, the couple's second son was delivered, unplanned, in the lobby of their apartment building. On November 24, 2021, Meyers announced the bathtub home birth of his daughter during Late Night's Corrections segment. The family had an Italian Greyhound named Frisbee. Frisbee died in August 2025 at the age of 14.

While interviewing Jake Tapper on the December 4, 2018, episode of Late Night, Meyers said that while he does not consider himself Jewish (despite his Ashkenazi Jewish heritage on his paternal side), his wife is Jewish, and their children are being raised in that faith. Their second son's middle name is the surname of Alexi's Holocaust-survivor grandparents. Beginning in July 2013, Alexi worked as an assistant district attorney in Brooklyn, assigned to the Sex Crimes Bureau. Since then, she joined Sanctuary for Families as an advocate for victims of gender violence.

During an interview on The Late Show With Stephen Colbert, Meyers said that he did not believe in an afterlife.

Meyers's children, dressed as "murder hornets," made a quick appearance during one COVID-19 episode of A Closer Look, filmed in the attic of the family's country home. He is a fan of U.S. sports teams including the Boston Red Sox, Boston Celtics, Pittsburgh Steelers, Pittsburgh Pirates, Pittsburgh Penguins (his father being a Pittsburgh native), Northwestern Wildcats (Seth's alma mater), and two European soccer teams, the Netherlands national football team and the Premier League club West Ham United.

A fan of comics, Meyers has cited Joe Hill's supernatural Locke & Key as one of his favorite comic book series. IDW Publishing gave him some of the replica keys they licensed.

== Filmography ==
=== Film ===
Year	Title	Role	Notes
2004	See This Movie	Jake Barrymore	
2004	Maestro	Tim Healy	Short
2004	Thunder Road	Voice-over	Short
2005	Perception	Steven	
2005	The Adventures of Big Handsome Guy and his Little Friend	Disgruntled Dork	Short
2006	American Dreamz	Chet Krogl	
2007	Hot Rod	none	Co-producer
2008	Journey to the Center of the Earth	Professor Alan Kitzens	
2008	Nick and Norah's Infinite Playlist	Drunk Guy in Yugo	
2009	Spring Breakdown	William Rushfield	
2010	MacGruber	none	Executive producer
2011	I Don't Know How She Does It	Chris Bunce	
2011	New Year's Eve	Griffin Byrne	
2014	The Interview	Himself	Cameo
2019	Late Night	Himself	Cameo
2022	Bros	Harvey Milk	
2024	Will & Harper	Himself	Documentary
2026	Lorne	Himself	Documentary

=== Television ===
Year	Title	Role	Notes
2001	Spin City	Doug	Episode "Rain on My Charades"
2001–2014	Saturday Night Live	Himself / Various	also head writer
2008–2012	Saturday Night Live Weekend Update Thursday	Himself	also head writer
2010	2010 ESPY Awards	Himself (host)	TV special
2011	2011 White House Correspondents' Dinner	Himself (host)	TV special
2011	2011 ESPY Awards	Himself (host)	TV special
2012–2016	The Mindy Project	Matt / Himself	2 episodes
2013	The Office	Himself	Episode: "Finale"
2013–2015	The Awesomes	Prock (voice)	30 episodes; also creator, writer, executive producer
2014–present	Late Night with Seth Meyers	Himself (host)	Also writer
2014	66th Primetime Emmy Awards	Himself (host)	TV special
2015	4th NFL Honors	Himself (host)	TV special
2015	Portlandia	Chad Koop	Episode: "Dead Pets"
2015	Difficult People	Dog Park Guy	Episode: "Premium Membership"
2016	Lady Dynamite	Himself	Episode: "Mein Ramp"
2016	This Is Us	Himself	Episode: "The Best Washing Machine in the Whole World"
2018	75th Golden Globe Awards	Himself (host)	TV special
2018	Saturday Night Live	Himself (host)	Episode: "Seth Meyers/Paul Simon"
2019	Crashing	Himself	Episode: "The Viewing Party"
2023	American Auto	Himself	Episode: "Most Hated CEO"
2024	Good One: A Show About Jokes	Himself	Mike Birbiglia documentary, also producer
2024–2026	The Late Show with Stephen Colbert	Himself	5 episodes, including the series finale
2025	Digman!	Chortles Collins (voice)	Episode: "Jack and Rose"

=== Podcasts ===
Year	Title	Studio
2016–present	Late Night with Seth Meyers Podcast	NBC
2023–2026	Strike Force Five	Spotify
2024–present	The Lonely Island and Seth Meyers Podcast	Rabbit Grin Productions
2024–present	Family Trips with the Meyers Brothers	Rabbit Grin Productions

=== Specials ===
Year	Title	Studio
2019	Seth Meyers: Lobby Baby	Netflix
2024	Seth Meyers: Dad Man Walking	HBO/Max

=== Writing credits ===
Year	Title	Writer	Executive Producer	Notes
2013	70th Golden Globe Awards	Yes	No	TV special
2014	71st Golden Globe Awards	Yes	No	TV special
2015	72nd Golden Globe Awards	Yes	No	TV special
2015–2022	Documentary Now!	Yes	Yes	27 episodes; also co-creator
2018–2021	A.P. Bio	No	Yes	42 episodes
2020	Mapleworth Murders	No	Yes	12 episodes
2020–2022	The Amber Ruffin Show	No	Yes	36 episodes

== Bibliography ==
- Meyers, Seth; Hader, Bill (May 28, 2009). Spider-Man: The Short Halloween. Marvel Comics.
- Meyers, Seth (March 15, 2022). I'm Not Scared, You're Scared. Penguin Books. ISBN 978-0593352403.

== Awards and nominations ==
Year	Award	Nominated work	Result	Ref.
2007	Writers Guild of America Award for Comedy/Variety (including talk) series	Saturday Night Live	Won	
2008	Writers Guild of America Award for Comedy/Variety (including talk) series	Saturday Night Live	Nominated	
2008	Primetime Emmy Award for Outstanding Writing for a Variety, Music, or Comedy Series	Saturday Night Live	Nominated	
2009	Writers Guild of America Award for Comedy/Variety (including talk) series	Saturday Night Live	Won	
2009	Peabody Award	Saturday Night Live	Won	
2009	Primetime Emmy Award for Outstanding Writing for a Variety, Music, or Comedy Series	Saturday Night Live	Nominated	
2010	Writers Guild of America Award for Comedy/Variety (including talk) series	Saturday Night Live	Won	
2010	Primetime Emmy Award for Outstanding Writing for a Variety Series	Saturday Night Live	Nominated	
2011	Writers Guild of America Award for Comedy/Variety (including talk) series	Saturday Night Live	Nominated	
2011	Primetime Emmy Award for Outstanding Writing for a Variety, Music, or Comedy Series	Saturday Night Live	Nominated	
2011	Primetime Emmy Award for Outstanding Writing for a Variety Special	The Women of SNL	Nominated	
2011	Primetime Emmy Award for Outstanding Original Music and Lyrics	Saturday Night Live for "Justin Timberlake Monologue"	Won	
2012	Writers Guild of America Award for Comedy/Variety (including talk) series	Saturday Night Live	Nominated	
2012	Golden Raspberry Award for Worst Screen Ensemble	New Year's Eve	Nominated	
2012	Primetime Emmy Award for Outstanding Writing for a Variety Series	Saturday Night Live	Nominated	
2012	Primetime Emmy Award for Outstanding Original Music and Lyrics	Saturday Night Live for "I Can't Believe I'm Hosting"	Nominated	
2013	Writers Guild of America Award for Comedy/Variety (including talk) series	Saturday Night Live	Nominated	
2013	Primetime Emmy Award for Outstanding Writing for a Variety Series	Saturday Night Live	Nominated	
2013	Primetime Emmy Award for Outstanding Writing for a Variety Special	Saturday Night Live Weekend Update Thursday	Nominated	
2013	Primetime Emmy Award for Outstanding Writing for a Variety Special	70th Golden Globe Awards	Nominated	
2014	Writers Guild of America Award for Comedy/Variety (including talk) series	Saturday Night Live	Nominated	
2014	Primetime Emmy Award for Outstanding Writing for a Variety Special	71st Golden Globe Awards	Nominated	
2015	Writers Guild of America Award for Comedy/Variety (Including Talk) – Series	Saturday Night Live	Nominated	
2015	Writers Guild of America Award for Comedy/Variety (Music, Awards, Tributes) – Specials	71st Golden Globe Awards	Won	
2015	Primetime Emmy Award for Outstanding Writing for a Variety Special	72nd Golden Globe Awards	Nominated	
2015	Primetime Emmy Award for Outstanding Writing for a Variety Special	Saturday Night Live 40th Anniversary Special	Nominated	
2016	Writers Guild of America Award for Comedy/Variety (Music, Awards, Tributes) – Specials	Saturday Night Live 40th Anniversary Special	Nominated	
2016	GLAAD Media Award for Outstanding Talk Show Episode	Late Night with Seth Meyers	Nominated	
2016	Primetime Emmy Award for Outstanding Variety Sketch Series	Documentary Now!	Nominated	
2016	Primetime Emmy Award for Outstanding Writing for a Variety Series	Saturday Night Live	Nominated	
2017	Writers Guild of America Award for Comedy/Variety – Talk Series	Late Night with Seth Meyers	Nominated	
2017	Writers Guild of America Award for Comedy/Variety – Sketch Series	Saturday Night Live	Won	
2017	Writers Guild of America Award for Comedy/Variety – Sketch Series	Documentary Now!	Nominated	
2017	GLAAD Media Award for Outstanding Talk Show Episode	Late Night with Seth Meyers	Nominated	
2017	Primetime Emmy Award for Outstanding Variety Sketch Series	Documentary Now!	Nominated	
2017	Primetime Emmy Award for Outstanding Writing for a Variety Series	Late Night with Seth Meyers	Nominated	
2018	Dorian Award for TV Current Affairs Show of the Year	Late Night with Seth Meyers	Nominated	
2018	Writers Guild of America Award for Comedy/Variety – Talk Series	Late Night with Seth Meyers	Nominated	
2018	TCA Award for Outstanding Achievement in Sketch/Variety Shows|	Late Night with Seth Meyers	Nominated	
2018	Primetime Emmy Award for Outstanding Writing for a Variety Series	Late Night with Seth Meyers	Nominated	
2018	Primetime Emmy Award for Outstanding Variety Special (Live)	75th Golden Globe Awards	Nominated	
2019	Writers Guild of America Award for Comedy/Variety – Talk Series	Late Night with Seth Meyers	Nominated	
2019	TCA Award for Outstanding Achievement in Sketch/Variety Shows	Late Night with Seth Meyers	Nominated	
2019	Primetime Emmy Award for Outstanding Variety Sketch Series	Documentary Now!	Nominated	
2019	Primetime Emmy Award for Outstanding Writing for a Variety Series	Documentary Now!	Nominated	
2019	Primetime Emmy Award for Outstanding Writing for a Variety Series	Late Night with Seth Meyers	Nominated	
2019	Primetime Emmy Award for Outstanding Original Music and Lyrics	Documentary Now! for "Holiday Party (I Did a Little Cocaine Tonight)"	Nominated	
2020	Writers Guild of America Award for Comedy/Variety – Talk Series	Late Night with Seth Meyers	Nominated	
2020	Critics' Choice Television Award for Best Talk Show	Late Night with Seth Meyers	Won	
2020	Critics' Choice Television Award for Best Comedy Special	Seth Meyers: Lobby Baby	Nominated	
2020	TCA Award for Outstanding Achievement in Sketch/Variety Shows	Late Night with Seth Meyers	Nominated	
2020	Primetime Emmy Award for Outstanding Writing for a Variety Series	Late Night with Seth Meyers	Nominated	
2020	Primetime Emmy Award for Outstanding Writing for a Variety Special	Seth Meyers: Lobby Baby	Nominated	
2021	Writers Guild of America Award for Comedy/Variety – Talk Series	Late Night with Seth Meyers	Nominated	
2021	Critics' Choice Television Award for Best Talk Show	Late Night with Seth Meyers	Won	
2021	TCA Award for Outstanding Achievement in Sketch/Variety Shows	Late Night with Seth Meyers	Nominated	
2021	Primetime Emmy Award for Outstanding Short Form Comedy, Drama or Variety Series	Late Night with Seth Meyers: CORRECTIONS	Nominated	
2021	People's Choice Award for The Nighttime Talk Show of 2021	Late Night with Seth Meyers	Nominated	
2022	Critics' Choice Television Award for Best Talk Show	Late Night with Seth Meyers	Nominated	
2022	GLAAD Media Award for Outstanding Talk Show Episode	Late Night with Seth Meyers	Nominated	
2022	TCA Award for Outstanding Achievement in Sketch/Variety Shows	Late Night with Seth Meyers	Nominated	
2022	Primetime Emmy Award for Outstanding Talk Series	Late Night with Seth Meyers	Nominated	
2022	Primetime Emmy Award for Outstanding Short Form Comedy, Drama or Variety Series	Late Night with Seth Meyers: CORRECTIONS	Nominated	
2022	People's Choice Award for The Nighttime Talk Show of 2022	Late Night with Seth Meyers	Nominated	
2023	Writers Guild of America Award for Comedy/Variety – Talk Series	Late Night with Seth Meyers	Nominated	
2023	Critics' Choice Television Award for Best Talk Show	Late Night with Seth Meyers	Nominated	
2023	TCA Award for Outstanding Achievement in Sketch/Variety Shows	Late Night with Seth Meyers	Nominated	
2023	Primetime Emmy Award for Outstanding Talk Series	Late Night with Seth Meyers	Nominated	
2023	Primetime Emmy Award for Outstanding Writing for a Variety Series	Late Night with Seth Meyers	Nominated	
2024	People's Choice Award for The Nighttime Talk Show of the Year	Late Night with Seth Meyers	Nominated	
2024	Writers Guild of America Award for Comedy/Variety – Talk Series	Late Night with Seth Meyers	Nominated	
2024	Critics' Choice Television Award for Best Talk Show	Late Night with Seth Meyers	Nominated	
2024	TCA Award for Outstanding Achievement in Sketch/Variety Shows	Late Night with Seth Meyers	Nominated	
2024	Primetime Emmy Award for Outstanding Talk Series	Late Night with Seth Meyers	Nominated	
2024	Primetime Emmy Award for Outstanding Short Form Comedy, Drama or Variety Series	Late Night with Seth Meyers: CORRECTIONS	Nominated	
2025	Golden Globe Award for Best Performance in Stand-Up Comedy on Television	Seth Meyers: Dad Man Walking	Nominated	
2025	Webby Award for Best Co-Hosts, Podcasts, People's Voice Winner	The Lonely Island and Seth Meyers Podcast	Won	
2025	Las Culturistas Culture Award for 'Best Vibe, Hands Down'	Seth Meyers	Won	
2025	GLAAD Media Award for Outstanding Talk Show Episode	Late Night with Seth Meyers	Nominated	
2025	Astra Award for Best Comedy or Standup Special	Seth Meyers: Dad Man Walking	Nominated	
2025	TCA Award for Outstanding Achievement in Sketch/Variety Shows	Late Night with Seth Meyers	Nominated	
2025	Primetime Emmy Award for Outstanding Short Form Comedy, Drama or Variety Series	Late Night with Seth Meyers: CORRECTIONS	Nominated	
2025	Primetime Emmy Award for Outstanding Writing for a Variety Special	Saturday Night Live 50th Anniversary Special	Won	
2026	Webby Award for Best Co-Hosts, Podcasts, People's Voice Winner	The Lonely Island and Seth Meyers Podcast	Won	

Media offices
Preceded by Jimmy Fallon	Host of Late Night; 2014-present	Succeeded by Incumbent
Preceded by Tina Fey and Amy Poehler	Weekend Update anchor with Amy Poehler; 2006–2008	Succeeded by Seth Meyers; Solo
Preceded by Seth Meyers and Amy Poehler	Weekend Update anchor Solo; 2008–2013	Succeeded by Seth Meyers and Cecily Strong
Preceded by Seth Meyers; Solo	Weekend Update anchor with Cecily Strong; 2013–2014	Succeeded by Cecily Strong and Colin Jost
Preceded by Tina Fey	SNL Head Writer with Tina Fey; 2005–2006	Succeeded by Seth Meyers; Solo
Preceded by Tina Fey and Seth Meyers	SNL Head Writer; Solo; 2006–2012	Succeeded by Seth Meyers and Colin Jost
Preceded by Seth Meyers; Solo	SNL Head Writer with Colin Jost; 2012–2014	Succeeded by Colin Jost
