= Natalie's Rap 2.0 =

Single by The Lonely Island

Single by The Lonely Island featuring Natalie Portman with Beck Bennett and Alex Moffat
- Released: February 3, 2018
- Recorded: 2018
- Genre: Comedy hip hop
- Length: 2:52
- Label: Self-released
- Songwriters: Andy Samberg; Akiva Schaffer; Jorma Taccone
- Producer: The Lonely Island

The Lonely Island singles chronology
"Finest Girl (Bin Laden Song)" (2016)	"Natalie's Rap 2.0" (2018)	"Sushi Glory Hole" (2024)

Music video
- "Natalie's Rap 2.0" on YouTube

"Natalie's Rap 2.0" is a song written and recorded by American comedy hip-hop group The Lonely Island and features Natalie Portman with Beck Bennett and Alex Moffat. It is the sequel to the 2006 single "Natalie's Rap" from the band's first album Incredibad. The music video premiered on the February 3, 2018, edition of Saturday Night Live (SNL) which Portman hosted, with the single being released to online services after the broadcast.

== Recording ==
SNL first contacted Samberg about a potential sequel to the original song three days before Portman was due to host her Saturday Night episode. In a brainstorm session on the Thursday before the show, The Lonely Island planned out the song over the phone between shooting breaks in Samberg's schedule, with Schaffer recording a rough demo later that day. The group continued to write late into Thursday night, and by Friday, they had recorded Portman's vocals with the group watching through FaceTime, with the remainder of the vocals picked up on the morning of the show. The recording was completed later that day, just in time for mixing and syncing with the music video.

The group had considered bringing back Chris Parnell to play the role of the interviewer, but due to him not being available in New York, they opted to bring in Beck Bennett in his place. Alex Moffat's portion of the video references Portman's role as Padmé Amidala in the Star Wars prequels.

== Composition ==
The song makes several cultural references and parodies current events such as the rise of the Me Too movement and the consumption of Tide Pods internet meme within the lyrics and music video. The song structure is similar to that of the original rap with Portman engaging in a mock interview. Claiming to have changed since the last interview, she states, "I was going through a really weird time then. But...I've matured a lot" before reverting to a similar pattern of described behaviors. When the interviewer appears to mock the quality of the Star Wars prequels, Portman (dressed as Padmé Amidala, whom she portrayed in the prequels, in the music video) takes a man hostage and coerces compliments from him to appease Jar Jar Binks.

== Music video ==
Natalie Portman "snacking" on Tide Pods in the official music video.

The music video was directed by Paul Briganti and made its premiere on the February 3, 2018, edition of SNL. The video was recorded the day before the television broadcast and before the song had been completely recorded, with Portman having to lip sync on the video recording to the rough demo which featured the voices of the band. Samberg's part of the video was written and recorded in Los Angeles within an hour that day and was sent over to New York to be edited into the cut.

The video follows the narrative of the song with Portman going through the events of her life since the last time she appeared on the show 12 years prior, including motherhood and her Oscar win. The video features a cameo from Kenan Thompson as a doctor interrupting Portman "giving birth".

The video has been viewed over seven million times through the band's VEVO and the official SNL accounts on YouTube.

== Track listing ==
All lyrics are written by The Lonely Island; all music is composed by JMIKE

Download, Streaming
No.	Title	Length
1.	"Natalie's Rap 2.0"	2:52

== Release history ==
Country	Date	Format	Label
Worldwide	February 3, 2018	Digital download	The Lonely Island (B079YJ5VSH)
