= Saturday Night Live Weekend Update Thursday =

Television series

- Also known as: Weekend Update: Special Edition (2009–2012); Weekend Update: Summer Edition (2017)
- Genre: Comedy; Satire; News Parody
- Created by: Lorne Michaels
- Written by: Seth Meyers (head writer)
- Directed by: Don Roy King
- Presented by: Amy Poehler; Seth Meyers; Colin Jost; Michael Che
- Starring: Fred Armisen; Will Forte; Bill Hader; Darrell Hammond; Bobby Moynihan; Andy Samberg; Jason Sudeikis; Kenan Thompson; Kristen Wiig; Casey Wilson; Abby Elliott; Nasim Pedrad; Tim Robinson; Jay Pharoah; Taran Killam; Kate McKinnon; Vanessa Bayer; Aidy Bryant; Cecily Strong; Pete Davidson; Mikey Day; Leslie Jones; Alex Moffat
- Narrated by: Don Pardo; Darrell Hammond
- Theme music composer: Jeff Richmond
- Country of origin: United States
- Original language: English
- No. of seasons: 4
- No. of episodes: 11

Production
- Executive producer: Lorne Michaels
- Producers: Steve Higgins; Marci Klein
- Running time: 30 minutes

Original release
- Network: NBC
- Release: October 9, 2008 – August 24, 2017

Related
- Saturday Night Live

Saturday Night Live Weekend Update Thursday is an American limited-run series broadcast on NBC. It is a political satire news show spin-off from Saturday Night Live, featuring that show's Weekend Update segment. It initially ran for three 30-minute episodes in October 2008, during the lead-up to the 2008 United States presidential election.

On March 14, 2017, NBC ordered a three-episode fourth iteration to be hosted by Michael Che and Colin Jost, premiering August 10, 2017, and going by the title Weekend Update: Summer Edition.

== Production history ==
=== Fall 2008 ===
The show premiered on Thursday, October 9, 2008, at 9:30 p.m. ET, after The Office. The remaining episodes aired in the same timeslot on October 16 and 23.

The format consists of a topical cold open sketch similar to most episodes of SNL, followed by an extended Weekend Update for the remaining time. The series is essentially a continuation of the short-form "primetime extra" specials which have aired intermittently since the 2000–2001 season, when NBC needed to fill time following "supersized" 40-minute episodes of Friends.

Several former Saturday Night Live alumni returned to this show: Will Ferrell reprised his role as President George W. Bush, while Tina Fey appeared as vice presidential candidate Sarah Palin, in a continuation of her much-publicized appearances on the regular show. During the first show, Bill Murray appeared as himself, one of the undecided voters at the second presidential debate sketch. Chris Parnell appeared in the first two episodes as the moderators of the debates, Tom Brokaw and Bob Schieffer.

=== Fall 2009 ===
Although originally intended to be a limited-run series, NBC announced on May 4, 2009, that they had ordered six new episodes of the show, making it the only show NBC introduced at the beginning of the 2008–2009 fall season to survive into a second term.

Darrell Hammond made guest appearances in the first three episodes, despite no longer being an SNL cast member. Former cast member Amy Poehler also returned as a special guest to co-anchor the first two episodes of the season. Although six were announced, the spring 2010 episodes were scrapped.

=== Fall 2012 ===
NBC announced two SNL specials to be broadcast on 8 p.m. Thursday beginning September 20, 2012. This time around, the show was listed as "SNL Primetime Election Special" in some TV listings, but the actual on-air program retained its original title.

=== Summer 2017 ===
On March 14, 2017, NBC announced a three-episode run of the series beginning August 10, 2017. This time, the program takes on the title of Saturday Night Live Weekend Update: Summer Edition and, with the exception of the third episode, completely does away with the cold open sketch and goes right into the news.

== Episodes ==
| Season | Episodes | Originally released | |
| Season | Episodes | First released | Last released |
|---|---|---|---|
| 1 | 3 | October 9, 2008 | October 23, 2008 |
| 2 | 3 | September 17, 2009 | October 1, 2009 |
| 3 | 2 | September 20, 2012 | September 27, 2012 |
| 4 | 3 | August 10, 2017 | August 24, 2017 |

=== Season 1 (2008) ===
| No. overall | No. in season | Original air date | Special guest(s) | US viewers (millions) |
|---|---|---|---|---|
| 1 | 1 | October 9, 2008 | Bill Murray and Chris Parnell | 10.9 |
Cold opening sketch features Darrell Hammond as Sen. John McCain and Fred Armisen as Sen. Barack Obama in the middle of the 2nd Presidential Debate.; Chris Parnell guest appears to reprise his Tom Brokaw impression and moderated the debate. Bill Murray also appears as townsperson "William Murray" asking a question.
| 2 | 2 | October 16, 2008 | Chris Parnell | 8.8 |
Cold opening sketch focuses the 3rd Presidential debate between McCain and Obama. Chris Parnell guest appears as Bob Schieffer and moderated the debate.; A new segment named "We Liked It" debuts.
| 3 | 3 | October 23, 2008 | Will Ferrell and Tina Fey | 8.8 |
The opening sketch features George W. Bush's (Will Ferrell) endorsement of a proud Sarah Palin (Tina Fey) and rather reluctant John McCain (Darrell Hammond).

=== Season 2 (2009) ===
Despite Lorne Michaels saying that three episodes would be airing in Fall 2009, then another three in early 2010, and three in Spring 2010, there were only three Weekend Update Thursday installments that occurred in Fall 2009.

| No. overall | No. in season | Original air date | Special guest(s) | US viewers (millions) |
|---|---|---|---|---|
| 4 | 1 | September 17, 2009 | Amy Poehler and Darrell Hammond | 5.70 |
Amy Poehler returns as a special guest to co-anchor Update alongside Seth Meyers.; Darrell Hammond appears as Jimmy Carter.
| 5 | 2 | September 24, 2009 | Amy Poehler, Megan Fox, and Darrell Hammond | 4.66 |
Amy Poehler returns to co-anchor Update alongside Seth Meyers.; Darrell Hammond appears as Bill Clinton.; Bill Hader appears as Keith Morrison.; Megan Fox appears to parody the finale of the soap opera Guiding Light.
| 6 | 3 | October 1, 2009 | Darrell Hammond and Maya Rudolph | 5.08 |
Darrell Hammond appears as Dennis Franz.; Maya Rudolph appears as Oprah Winfrey.

=== Season 3 (2012) ===
| No. overall | No. in season | Original air date | Special guest(s) | US viewers (millions) |
|---|---|---|---|---|
| 7 | 1 | September 20, 2012 | N/A | 5.15 |
| 8 | 2 | September 27, 2012 | N/A | 4.67 |

=== Season 4 (2017) ===
| No. overall | No. in season | Original air date | Special guest(s) | US viewers (millions) |
|---|---|---|---|---|
| 9 | 1 | August 10, 2017 | Bill Hader | 6.5 |
Bill Hader appears as Anthony Scaramucci.
| 10 | 2 | August 17, 2017 | Jimmy Fallon, Seth Meyers, and Tina Fey | 5.8 |
Jimmy Fallon and Seth Meyers appear as George Washington and Thomas Jefferson, respectively.; Tina Fey appears to comment on the 2017 Charlottesville attack.
| 11 | 3 | August 24, 2017 | Alec Baldwin | 5.8 |
Alec Baldwin appears as Donald Trump in the cold open.
