= Sushi Glory Hole =

Single by The Lonely Island
- Released: October 7, 2024
- Genre: Comedy rap
- Length: 2:22
- Label: Self-released
- Songwriters: Andy Samberg; Jorma Taccone; Akiva Schaffer
- Producer: DJ Nu-Mark

The Lonely Island singles chronology
"Natalie's Rap 2.0" (2018)	"Sushi Glory Hole" (2024)

Music video
- "Sushi Glory Hole" on YouTube

"Sushi Glory Hole" is a song and SNL Digital Short by American comedy troupe The Lonely Island. The song premiered on Saturday Night Live on October 5, 2024, their first digital short since 2018's Natalie's Rap 2.0. The song, performed by Andy Samberg and Akiva Schaffer, portrays two businessmen attempting to pitch a sushi delivery service that utilizes glory holes. The song was released on streaming platforms on October 7, 2024.

== Background ==
During the 2024 United States presidential election season, Samberg returned to Saturday Night Live to portray Doug Emhoff opposite Maya Rudolph's Kamala Harris. Schaffer and Samberg had previously written the song during the 2023 Writers Guild of America strike, and viewed Samberg's return as the perfect opportunity to create the short. The song was produced by DJ Nu-Mark, a frequent collaborator of the trio.

== Music video ==
The music video stars Schaffer (also director) and Samberg as two businessmen struggling to pitch a glory hole based sushi delivery app to a group of skeptical investors (Maya Rudolph, Bowen Yang, and Kenan Thompson). The video also features cast members James Austin Johnson, Andrew Dismukes, Chloe Fineman, Devon Walker, and Mikey Day as users of the app.

A man (James Austin Johnson) receiving a piece of nigirizushi through a glory hole.
