= Nicolas Jaar discography =

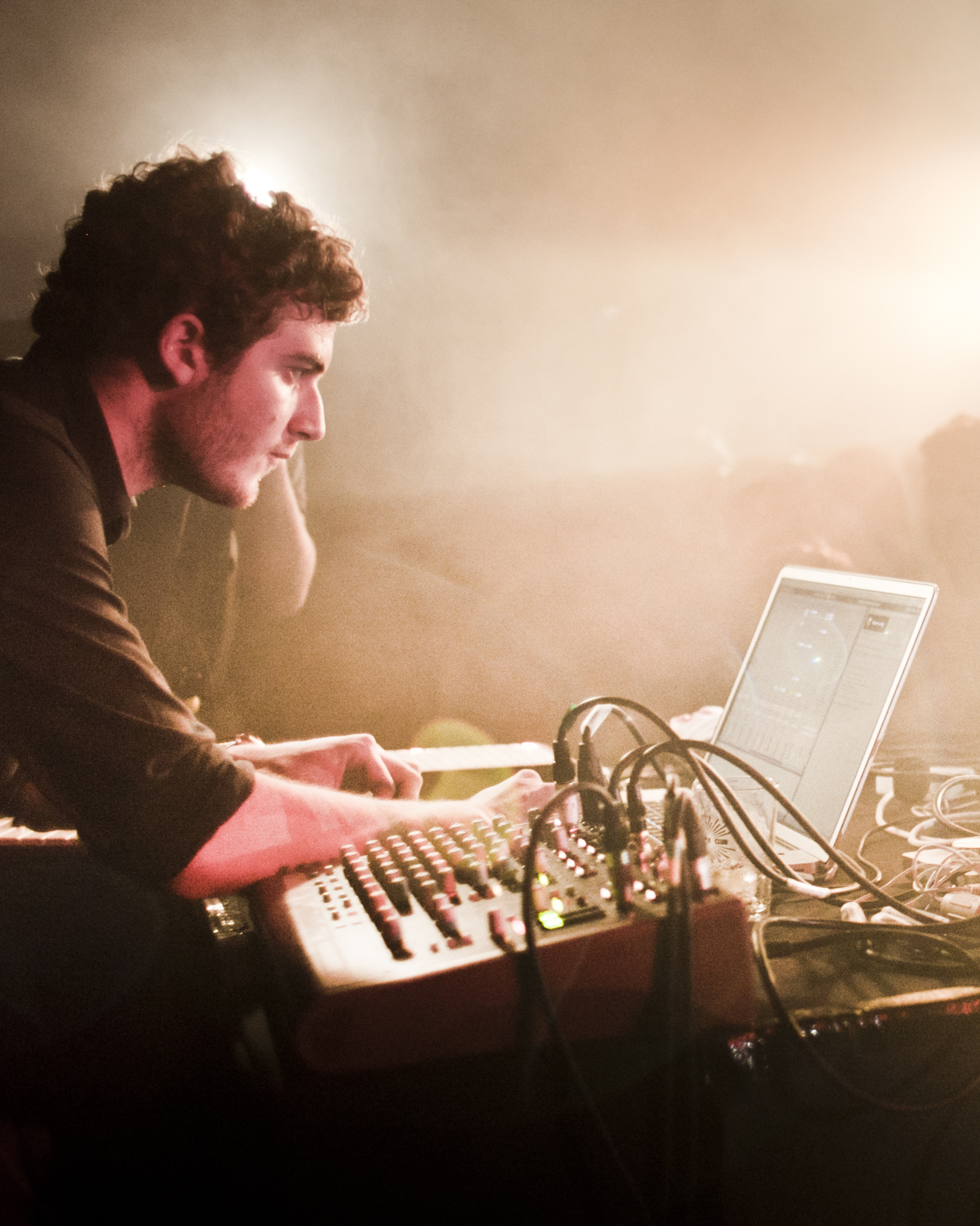
- Jaar performing live in Paris in April 2011
- Studio albums: 8
- EPs: 10
- Soundtrack albums: 3
- Compilation albums: 2
- DJ mixes: 11
- Production credits: 28

The discography of Nicolas Jaar includes eight studio albums, ten extended plays, three official soundtracks, and many mixes and production credits. In addition to releasing music under his birth name, Jaar also releases music under the alias Against All Logic, sometimes shortened to A.A.L., as well as under the name Nico.

== Albums ==
Year	Album details	Peak chart positions
Year	Album details	FRA
2011	Space Is Only Noise: Released: January 31, 2011; Label: Circus Company; Formats: CD, digital download, LP	—
2015	Pomegranates: Released: February 22, 2015; Label: Other People; Format: streaming video (YouTube); Introduced as the soundtrack to The Color of Pomegranates (1969)	—
2016	Nymphs: Released: September 23, 2016; Label: Other People; Formats: digital download, LP	—
2016	Sirens: Released: September 30, 2016; Label: Other People; Formats: CD, digital download, LP	164
2020	Cenizas: Released: March 27, 2020; Label: Other People; Formats: digital download, LP	—
2020	Telas: Released: July 17, 2020; Label: Other People; Formats: digital download, LP	

=== Collaborative albums ===
Year	Details
2023	Intiha (with Ali Sethi): Scheduled: November 17, 2023; Label: Other People; Formats: digital download, LP
2025	Crashing waves dance to the rhythm set by the broadcast journalist revealing the tragedies of the day (with Charbel Haber and Sary Moussa): Released: July 4, 2025; Formats: digital download, cassette

=== Against All Logic ===
Year	Details
2018	2012–2017: Released: February 17, 2018; Label: Other People; Formats: digital download, LP
2020	2017–2019: Released: February 7, 2020; Label: Other People; Formats: digital download, LP

== Extended plays ==
Year	Details
2008	The Student: Released: April 5, 2008; Label: Wolf + Lamb Music
2009	Democracy EP: New Friends Vol. 2 (Soul Keita featuring Nicolas Jaar): Released: December 21, 2009; Label: Greta Cottage Workshop
2010	Marks & Angles: Released: May 17, 2010; Label: Circus Company
2010	A Time for Us / Mi Mujer: Released: January 25, 2010; Label: Wolf + Lamb Music
2010	Love You Gotta Lose Again: Released: October 5, 2010; Label: Double Standard Records
2010	Remixes Vol. 1: Released: July 1, 2010; Label: Circus Company
2011	Nico's Bluewave Edits (as Nico): Released: July 10, 2011; Label: W+L Black
2011	Don't Break My Love: Released: November 1, 2011; Label: Clown & Sunset; Re-released as Nymphs I in 2015 on Other People
2015	Nymphs II: Released: May 11, 2015; Label: Other People
2015	Nymphs III: Released: June 29, 2015; Label: Other People

=== Against All Logic ===
Year	Details
2014	Issue #9: Released: February 1, 2014; Label: Other People

== Compilations ==
Title	Details
Edits LP	Released: September 17, 2010; Label: Wolf + Lamb Music; Formats: Digital download

== Singles ==
Year	Details
2010	"Russian Dolls": Released: March 5, 2010; Label: Clown and Sunset
2010	"Wouh": Released: January 3, 2010; Label: Clown and Sunset
2015	"Fight (Nymphs IV)": Released: October 7, 2015; Label: R&S

=== Against All Logic ===
Year	Details
2014	"Stand Up" / "So Far": Released: July 29, 2014; Label: Other People
2014	"You Are the One": Released: October 7, 2014; Label: Other People
2015	"I Never Dream": Released: May 31, 2015; Label: Other People
2015	"Rave on You": Released: December 31, 2015; Label: Other People
2020	"Illusions of Shameless Abundance": Released: January 31, 2020; Label: Other People

== Soundtracks ==
Year	Details
2015	Dheepan: Official soundtrack to Dheepan (2015); Released: May 22, 2015; Production company: Why Not Productions, France 2, Page 114; Awards: Palme d'Or at 2015 Cannes Film Festival.
2019	Ema: Official score to Ema (2019); Released: August 30, 2019; Production Company: Fabula; Awards: Best Score at Miami International Film Festival
2020	Beginning: Official soundtrack to Beginning (2019); Released: 11 September 2020; Production Company: First Picture / OFA

== Remixes ==
Year	Artist	Track	Title
2009	No Regular Play	"Owe Me"	Nicolas Jaar Mix
2010	Azari & III	"Into the Night"	Nicolas Jaar Remix
2010	DJ T.	"Gorilla Hug"	Nicolas Jaar Remix
2010	Ellen Allien	"Flashy Flashy"	Nicolas Jaar Remix
2010	Guillaume & The Coutu Dumonts	"Walking The Pattern"	(unreleased)
2010	Kasper Bjørke	"Heaven"	Nicolas Jaar Remix
2010	Maceo Plex	"Gravy Train"	Nicolas Jaar Remix
2010	Matthew Dear	"You Put a Smell On Me"	Nicolas Jaar Remix
2010	The Bees	"Winter Rose"	Nicolas Jaar Remix
2011	Architecture in Helsinki	"W.O.W"	Nicolas Jaar Remix
2011	Ceo	"Illuminata"	Nicolas Jaar Remix
2011	Sneaky Sound System	"Big"	Nicolas Jaar's Always By Your Side Version
2011	When Saints Go Machine	"Fail Forever"	Nicolas Jaar Remix
2012	Cat Power	"Cherokee"	Nicolas Jaar Remix
2012	Chet Faker	"Terms and Conditions"	Nicolas Jaar Remix
2012	Shlohmo	"Rained the Whole Time"	Nicolas Jaar Remix
2013	Brian Eno	"Lux"	Nicolas Jaar Remix
2013	Grizzly Bear	"Sleeping Ute"	Nicolas Jaar Remix
2014	Kanye West	"Blood on the Leaves"	(unreleased)
2015	Florence and the Machine	"What Kind of Man"	Nicolas Jaar Remix
2015	Lydia Lunch	"American Invasion"	Weasel Walter and Nicolas Jaar Remix

=== Edits ===
Year	Artist	Track	Title	Release notes
2010	Bailey & Bridges	"Come and Get It"	Come N Get It	Edits LP
2010	Dave Brubeck Quartet	"Calcutta Blues"	Mini Calcutta	Edits LP
2010	Michael Jackson	"Billie Jean"	Nico's Rework	Free download via Wolf+Lamb
2010	New Order	"Blue Monday"	The Beach	Edits LP
2010	Nina Simone	"Feeling Good"	Nico's Feelin Good	Edits LP
2010	Grateful Dead	"Shakedown Street"	Shakedown	Edits LP
2010	The Searchers	"Love Potion No. 9"	Stay in Love	Edits LP
2011	Mike & The Censations	"There's Nothing I Can Do About It"	What My Last Girl Put Me Through	Nico’s Bluewave Edits
2011	Missy Elliott	"Work It"	Work It (Nico's Bluewave Edit)	Nico’s Bluewave Edits
2011	The Blow	"Hey Boy"	Hey Boy (Nico's Bluewave Edit)	Nico’s Bluewave Edits
2014	The Hellen Hollins Singers	"Consolation"	Consolation (Nicolas Jaar Edit)	Free download via Other People

=== Unreleased edits ===
Year	Artist	Track	Title	Appearance
2009	Geraldine Hunt	"Can't Fake the Feeling"	Nico's Edit	Get the Curse podcast
2009	Mulatu Astatke	"Yèkèrmo Sèw"	Nico's Edit	Get the Curse podcast
2009	Stretch	"Why Did Ya Do It"	Nico's Edit	Get the Curse podcast
2010	Tinariwen	Amassakoul 'N' Ténéré	Nicolas Jaar Edit	BSR Radio mix
2011	Nicolas Jaar	"Materials"	Nico's Bluewave Edit	XLR8R Podcast 184
2011	The Enticers	"Thief"	Nicolas Jaar Live Set Edit	XLR8R Podcast 184
2011	Wendy Rene	"After Laughter Comes Tears"	Nicolas Jaar Edit	XLR8R Podcast 184
2012	LaShun Pace	"It's Me Oh Lord (Acapella Praise)"	Nicolas Jaar Edit	BBC's The Essential Mix
2012	Luca C & Brigante	"Lucio"	Nicolas Jaar & Dave Harrington Edit	
2012	NSYNC	"It Makes Me Ill"	Nicolas Jaar Edit	BBC's The Essential Mix
2012	The Electric Prunes	"Holy Are You"	There Is No God Edit	BBC's The Essential Mix
2012	The Grass Roots	"Let's Live For Today"	Learn to Live Edit	BBC's The Essential Mix
2012	Vera November	"Last Night Together"	You're Coming Back Edit	BBC's The Essential Mix
2017	Obbatuké	"Elegua"	Nicolas Jaar Edit	Departamento DJ set
2017	Piero	"Mi Viejo"	Nicolas Jaar Edit	Performed live on South America tour

== Miscellaneous tracks ==
Year	Track	Date	Release details
2008	New York	December 23, 2009	Unreleased, Modyfier's Process 083
2009	Deleuze's Will	February 13, 2009	"Extraction" on AirDrop Records
2009	Disco Loco	December 23, 2009	Unreleased, Get The Curse podcast
2009	El Bandido	March 8, 2009	"Significant Others" on Wolf + Lamb Records
2009	La Bohème	May 5, 2009	Unreleased, MWT Soul Clap Podcast
2009	Little Seth	December 23, 2009	Unreleased, Get The Curse podcast
2009	Love Teacher	October 30, 2009	"Snuggle & Slap" on Circus Company
2009	Your Waltz	October 30, 2009	"Snuggle & Slap" on Circus Company
2010	Dubliners	November 4, 2010	"Inès" on Clown and Sunset
2010	Goin' Bad (with Soul Keita)	November 4, 2010	"Inès" on Clown and Sunset
2010	John the Revelator	July 29, 2010	Self-released
2010	Now Listen	November 30, 2010	Unreleased, Beats in Space mix
2010	Marcy	February 16, 2010	Unreleased, BSR Radio mix
2010	Mwashah	February 16, 2010	Unreleased, BSR Radio mix
2010	Show Me The Way To The Fire (Tired of the Smoke)	October 7, 2010	Unreleased, Breezeblock mix
2010	Tribute to My Mother	November 4, 2010	"Inès" on Clown and Sunset
2010	You Are The Cure For My	November 30, 2010	Unreleased, Beats in Space mix
2011	Avalanche (Tribute to Leonard Cohen)	February 8, 2011	XLR8R Podcast 184
2011	Can't See What Is Burning There	March 1, 2011	"DJ-Kicks: Wolf + Lamb vs. Soul Clap" on !K7 Records
2012	And I Say (featuring Scout LaRue & Will Epstein)	January, 2012	Self-released
2012	Encore	March 31, 2012	Free download on Clown and Sunset site
2012	Ishmael (with Will Epstein)	November 19, 2012	"Don't Break My Love" on Clown and Sunset
2012	Never Have I Ever (with Dave Harrington & Will Epstein)	November 19, 2012	"Don't Break My Love" on Clown and Sunset
2012	Play the Drums for Me	November 12, 2012	"Get Lost V Mixed by Acid Pauli" on Crosstown Rebels
2012	The Ego (with Theatre Roosevelt)	November 23, 2012	Self-released
2012	What's the Name	June 15, 2012	Unreleased, Sonar Lab in Barcelona
2013	Break My Love	September 2, 2013	"Trust" on Other People
2013	Marquises	July 1, 2013	"Sunset of a Clown, Vol. 2" on Clown and Sunset
2013	Take Me Out Of The Dark Rain	July 1, 2013	Unreleased, DJ Set at Clown & Sunset Takeover, Boiler Room
2014	The Boy Who Asked Too Much	September 9, 2014	"Work" on Other People
2014	The President's Answering Machine	September 9, 2014	"Work" on Other People
2020	Playing with Fire	September 4, 2020	"Nisf Madeena" on Ma3azef
2024	ESCL8	May 31, 2024	"Enough!" on Dreaming Live

== Mixes ==
Year	Details
2008	Live at the Marcy Hotel
2010	Resident Advisor 211: Released: June 14, 2010
2011	XLR8R Podcast 184: Released: February 8, 2011
2012	Live at Sonar, Barcelona: Released: June 15, 2012
2012	BBC Radio 1 Essential Mix: Released: May 18, 2012; Won BBC Radio 1's Essential Mix Of The Year
2013	Boiler Room NYC, Clown & Sunset Takeover: Released: April 27, 2013
2013	OUR WORLD: Released: December 8, 2013
2015	Resident Advisor 500: Released: December 28, 2015
2016	The Network on NTS Radio: Released: September 8, 2016
2017	TRANSITION, Boiler Room Aviv: Released: May 31, 2017

== Production credits ==
Albums

- Facepaint by Buzzy Lee (2018)
- Spoiled Love by Buzzy Lee (2021)

Tracks

Title	Year	Artist(s)	Album	Credits	Written with	Produced with
"Call Out My Name"	2018	The Weeknd	My Dear Melancholy	Co-writer	The Weeknd, Frank Dukes	–
"Thousand Eyes"	2019	FKA Twigs	Magdalene	Co-writer, producer, mixing engineer	FKA Twigs	FKA Twigs, Noah Goldstein
"Home with You"	2019	FKA Twigs	Magdalene	Additional producer, vocal producer, programmer	—	FKA Twigs, Noah Goldstein
"Sad Day"	2019	FKA Twigs	Magdalene	Co-writer, producer, drums, synths	FKA Twigs, Koreless, Benny Blanco, Cashmere Cat, Skrillex, Noah Goldstein	FKA Twigs, Koreless, Benny Blanco, Cashmere Cat, Skrillex, Noah Goldstein
"Mary Magdalene"	2019	FKA Twigs	Magdalene	Co-writer, producer, piano, drums	FKA Twigs, Cashmere Cat, Benny Blanco	FKA Twigs, Cashmere Cat, Benny Blanco, Koreless, Noah Goldstein
"Fallen Alien"	2019	FKA Twigs	Magdalene	Co-writer, producer, drums, programmer	FKA Twigs, Ethan P. Flynn, Cy An, Arthur Timothy Jones, Milton Biggham	FKA Twigs
"Mirrored Heart"	2019	FKA Twigs	Magdalene	Drums	—	—
"Cellophane"	2019	FKA Twigs	Magdalene	Additional programmer, additional percussion	—	—
