= Kids Aflame =

Studio album by ARMS
- Released: 9 June 2008
- Genre: Pop
- Length: 41:12
- Label: Melodic Records; Gigantic Music

ARMS chronology
| Kids Aflame (2008) | EP (2010) |

ARMS studio album chronology
| Kids Aflame (2008) | Summer Skills (2011) |

Singles from Kids Aflame
- 1. "Whirring" Released: 30 April 2007

Kids Aflame is the debut album by American indie band ARMS. It was released on 9 June 2008 by Melodic Records in the United Kingdom and on 27 October 2009 by Gigantic Music in the United States.

== Critical reception ==
Professional ratings
Aggregate scores
| Source | Rating |
|---|---|
| Metacritic | 74/100 |
Review scores
| Source | Rating |
| AllMusic | 3.5/5 stars |
| Pitchfork Media | 6.1/10 |
| PopMatters | 8/10 |

Kids Aflame received generally favorable reviews; aggregating website Metacritic reports an average score of 74 out of 100, based on 6 reviews.

== Track listing ==
All tracks are written by Todd Goldstein.

Kids Aflame
| No. | Title | Length |
|---|---|---|
| 1. | "Sabretooth Typist" | 0:43 |
| 2. | "Whirring" | 4:08 |
| 3. | "Construction" | 3:13 |
| 4. | "Kids Aflame" | 3:15 |
| 5. | "Tiger Tamer" | 2:55 |
| 6. | "Sad, Sad, Sad" | 3:49 |
| 7. | "Shitty Little Disco" | 3:49 |
| 8. | "The Frozen Lake" | 1:55 |
| 9. | "Fall" | 2:57 |
| 10. | "John the Escalator" | 3:05 |
| 11. | "Eyeball" | 4:03 |
| 12. | "Pocket" | 2:56 |
| 13. | "Ana M" | 4:32 |
| Total length: | | 41:12 |

Kids Aflame (bonus version)
| No. | Title | Length |
|---|---|---|
| 14. | "Tokyo Moon" | 2:30 |
| 15. | "Gunsmoke Legend" | 2:06 |
| 16. | "Whirring [Acoustic]" | 4:23 |
