= 2012–2017 =

Studio album by Against All Logic
- Released: February 17, 2018
- Recorded: 2012–2017
- Genre: House
- Length: 66:35
- Label: Other People
- Producer: Nicolas Jaar

Nicolas Jaar chronology
Sirens (2016)	2012–2017 (2018)	2017–2019 (2020)

2012–2017 is an album by Against All Logic, an alias sometimes used by American electronic music artist Nicolas Jaar, which released on February 17, 2018. Considered by some to be a compilation, it is Jaar's third studio album, and the first under the "Against All Logic" name, which he has used since 2013. It was published by his own label Other People.

The album is a collection of house tracks Jaar had produced within the titular years. Some publicly debuted with its release, while others were on a mix he put out in 2016. 2012–2017's compositions are usually built around chopped soul and funk samples that repeat for much of the songs' run times. Jaar made strong use of production effects like clipping, filters, and fades, creating sonic "textures" that play alongside the main instrumentals. The album is less experimental and more upbeat than his prior works.

Jaar uploaded the album to Other People's website with almost no warning or promotion from him or the label, which continued after release. Pitchfork publicized its existence a week later, writing that "almost nobody" had noticed it existed. 2012–2017 then received critical acclaim, being listed by many outlets as one of the best albums of 2018. In 2020, Jaar released a follow-up under the Against All Logic name, 2017–2019.

== Background ==
Electronic music artist Nicolas Jaar had developed a reputation for "stormy, fractured dance music" prior to his 2018 album 2012–2017. That year, Billboard writer Andy Cush said that Jaar has an "omnivorous musical appetite" that makes him frequently change the influences behind his music. Jaar released two studio albums under his own name prior to 2018: Space Is Only Noise (2011), a sound collage of microhouse beats and recordings of nature; and Sirens (2016), which features elements of synth-punk and avant-garde classical music.

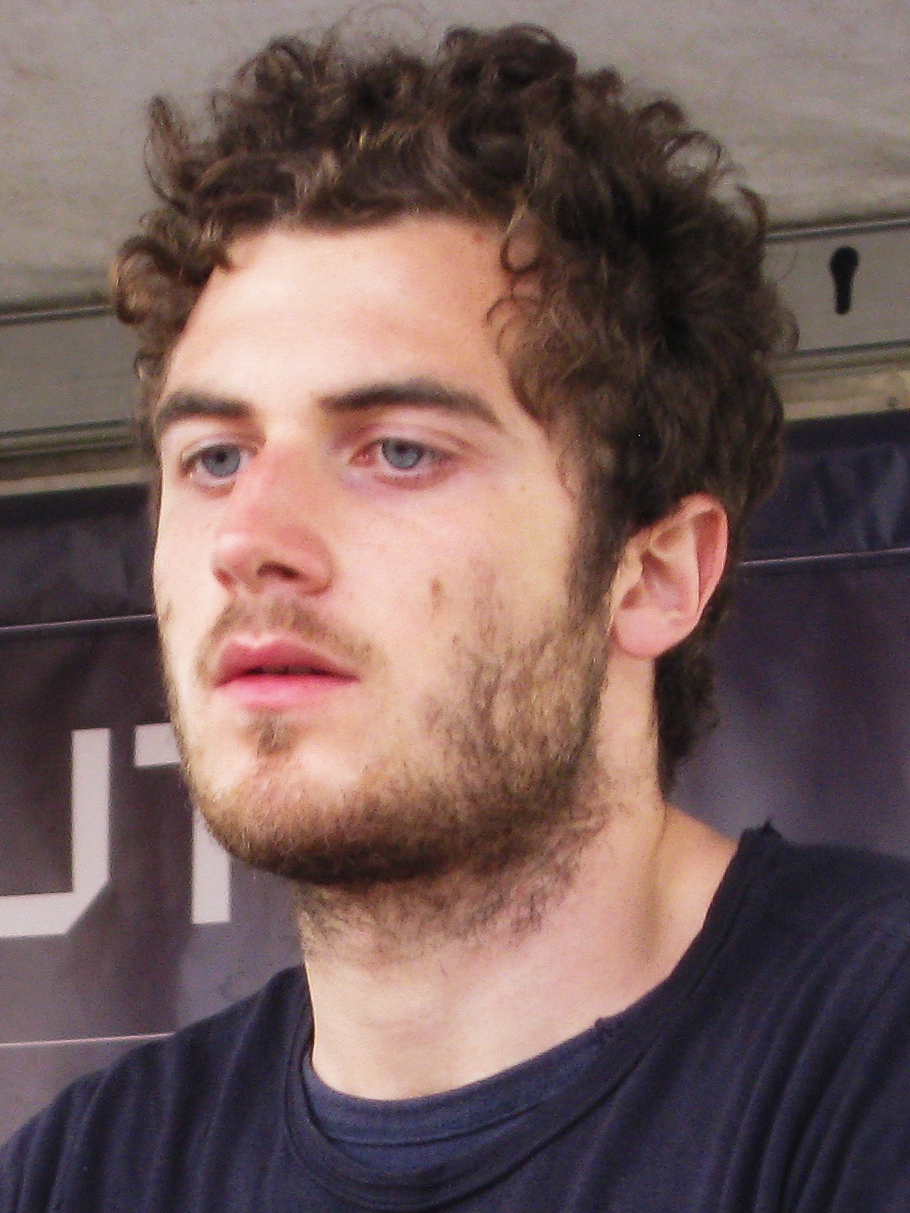
Nicolas Jaar in 2012

At the start of Jaar's career, his music was published by the Wolf + Lamb label, but he later began releasing under his own label, Other People. He has performed or released works not just under his own name, but also under certain aliases, such as "Iva Gocheva". Darkside, his band, used the alias "Daftside" for their remix of Daft Punk's album Random Access Memories (2013). Jaar has stated that this causes music outlets to make mistakes in summarizing his discography: "I always find it funny when announcements say something is ‘the first Nicolas Jaar single in three years,’ as I’ve put out work under many different names". Since 2013, he has also released music as "Against All Logic", but the alias' discography was "[not] known to most casual fans" of Jaar until 2012–2017.

== Music ==
The eleven songs on 2012–2017 are house tracks produced by Jaar during the titular years. Some of the tracks publicly debuted with the album's release, while the rest were part of a mix he put out under the Against All Logic name in 2016. Certain outlets thus consider the album to be a compilation. Unlike Jaar's releases (such as Sirens) that came shortly prior to it, 2012–2017 has a mostly upbeat atmosphere—similar to his material under Wolf + Lamb. After the album's release, many outlets stated that it might be one of Jaar's most "accessible" works to general audiences. The back of its vinyl release even states: "If you don't know jack about house, then you'll love this!"

2012–2017 contains dance, techno, soul, and funk influences. The songs' musical elements are built around samples of various artists' works, usually those in the soul and funk genres. They have consistently quick tempos, and are decorated with strong sonic "textures"—like sudden bursts of noise—that make them "crackle and munch in the mix". All were produced by Jaar, while their mastering was done by Mike Bozzi.

=== Tracks 1–5 ===
The first song, "This Old House Is All I Have", is a "hypnotic strut" that samples David Axelrod's 1970 song "The Warning Talk (Part II)"—used in many hip-hop and dance tracks—and a song by Mike James Kirkland. Its opening notes have intentional clipping, which goes away when it "opens up" into a soul groove. Jaar eventually introduces his own vocals. KEXP-FM writer Dusty Henry describes the song's atmosphere as being "like the opening scroll to a [1970s] cop flick mixed with a sweaty, underground dance party." Some outlets describe the next track, "I Never Dream", as one of the happiest songs in Jaar's discography. It has a run time of six minutes, throughout which he loops funk breakbeats and joyous synths. These are built around filtered and chopped vocal samples that fade in and out, sometimes "twisting and turning in on themselves". The third track, "Some Kind of Game", has a looping soul sample and heavy kicks. A "brooding" atmosphere is introduced with the song "Hopeless". It is followed by "Know You", which has a repetitive soul instrumental like "Some Kind of Game". It features intense electronic drums, and an aura of "silliness" stemming from a "wildly chirpy" refrain of Jaar's own vocals.

=== Tracks 6–11 ===
"Such a Bad Way", a disco track, is sixth on the album. It samples Kanye West's screaming on the 2013 song "I Am a God", which contrasts with the joyous tone of Jaar's instrumental. The seventh track, "Cityfade", has a long run time, and features vocal refrains over repeating piano chords. Similar refrains are found on the following "Now U Got Me Hooked". They play in between the song's rhythmic sections, and the composition alternates between minimalist and maximalist styles. It samples a song by The Dramatics. "Flash in the Pan", the ninth song, features hard-hitting funk drums, a powerful bassline, "queasy" synths, and is produced with a "banged up", low-fidelity style. The penultimate track is "You're Going to Love Me and Scream". It features a "digital" sound that Jaar eventually "tears open" to introduce a more intense atmosphere. "Rave on U" is the album's closer, and has a run time of ten minutes. During the song, Jaar emotionally builds upon a repeating melody by introducing other musical elements, such as punchy synths and a "shaking" audio effect applied to the production.

== Release ==
2012–2017 debuted on Other People's website on February 17, 2018. This was done with almost no warning or promotion from Jaar or the label, and that continued after release. Andy Cush theorized this was intentional, noting that Jaar's name does not appear on the album's cover, and that its entry on the label's online store did not have a description. On February 23, Pitchfork writers Matthew Strauss and Amanda Wicks reported on the album's existence, writing: "Nicolas Jaar quietly dropped an album last week, and almost nobody noticed". The article brought it to people's attention. Other People eventually released 2012–2017 as a double album on vinyl. The album's cover and packaging were designed by Jena Myung.

== Reception and legacy ==
Professional ratings
Aggregate scores
Source	Rating
Metacritic	82/100
Review scores
Source	Rating
AllMusic	4/5 stars
Clash	8/10
Pitchfork	8.8/10
Resident Advisor	2.8/5

2012–2017 received almost universal acclaim. On Metacritic, which assigns a normalized rating out of 100 to reviews from mainstream publications, it received an average score of 82, based on 5 reviews.

Randall Colburn of Consequence of Sound described the album as "pretty great". Andrew Gaerig praised its samples for Pitchfork, saying Jaar had "excellent taste" and a talent for finding them; the site awarded the album "Best New Music"—what they consider the single best music release of any week. They similarly gave "Best New Track" to "I Never Dream". Pitchfork's Kevin Lozano said the song was 2012–2017's "immediate highlight", and that it showed that Jaar was as good as chopping up samples as legendary hip-hop producer J Dilla. Writing for AllMusic, Fred Thomas said it was easily the "most inviting" of Jaar's work. For Clash, Matthew Cooper wrote that Jaar eschewing his usual avant garde style and unusual time signatures for "something much more predictable" made 2012–2017 give "an instant impact" to listeners. The Young Folks' Hunter Church positively noted that the album does contain experimentation on every track, but that all the tracks contain "at least one section that could easily play at a club."

Andrew Ryce of Resident Advisor gave a rare negative review of the album, calling it an "unflattering" pastiche of other house and disco works which only has "brief flashes of inspiration". He disliked the repetition in songs like "Cityfade", saying their musical foundations are "soulful and rapturous", but rarely ever become "transcendent".

2012–2017 was listed as one of the best electronic albums of 2018 by Pitchfork and Treble, and as one of the best in any genre that year by Treble and Rolling Stone. In 2020, The Young Folks listed it as an essential record to get into the IDM genre. The album made Jaar's "Against All Logic" alias a "known quantity". In January 2020, he released a two-song EP and an album under the name. The latter, 2017–2019, is a follow-up album—another collection of electronic tracks produced within its titular period, but featuring a "warped" techno sound instead of its predecessor's "warmer" house music.

== Track listing ==
All tracks are produced by Nicolas Jaar.

No.	Title	Length
1.	"This Old House Is All I Have"	3:38
2.	"I Never Dream"	6:45
3.	"Some Kind of Game"	6:47
4.	"Hopeless"	5:40
5.	"Know You"	4:24
6.	"Such a Bad Way"	4:53
7.	"Cityfade"	5:40
8.	"Now U Got Me Hooked"	5:51
9.	"Flash in the Pan"	7:27
10.	"You're Going to Love Me and Scream"	5:35
11.	"Rave on U"	9:55
