= Ladell McLin =

American bluesman

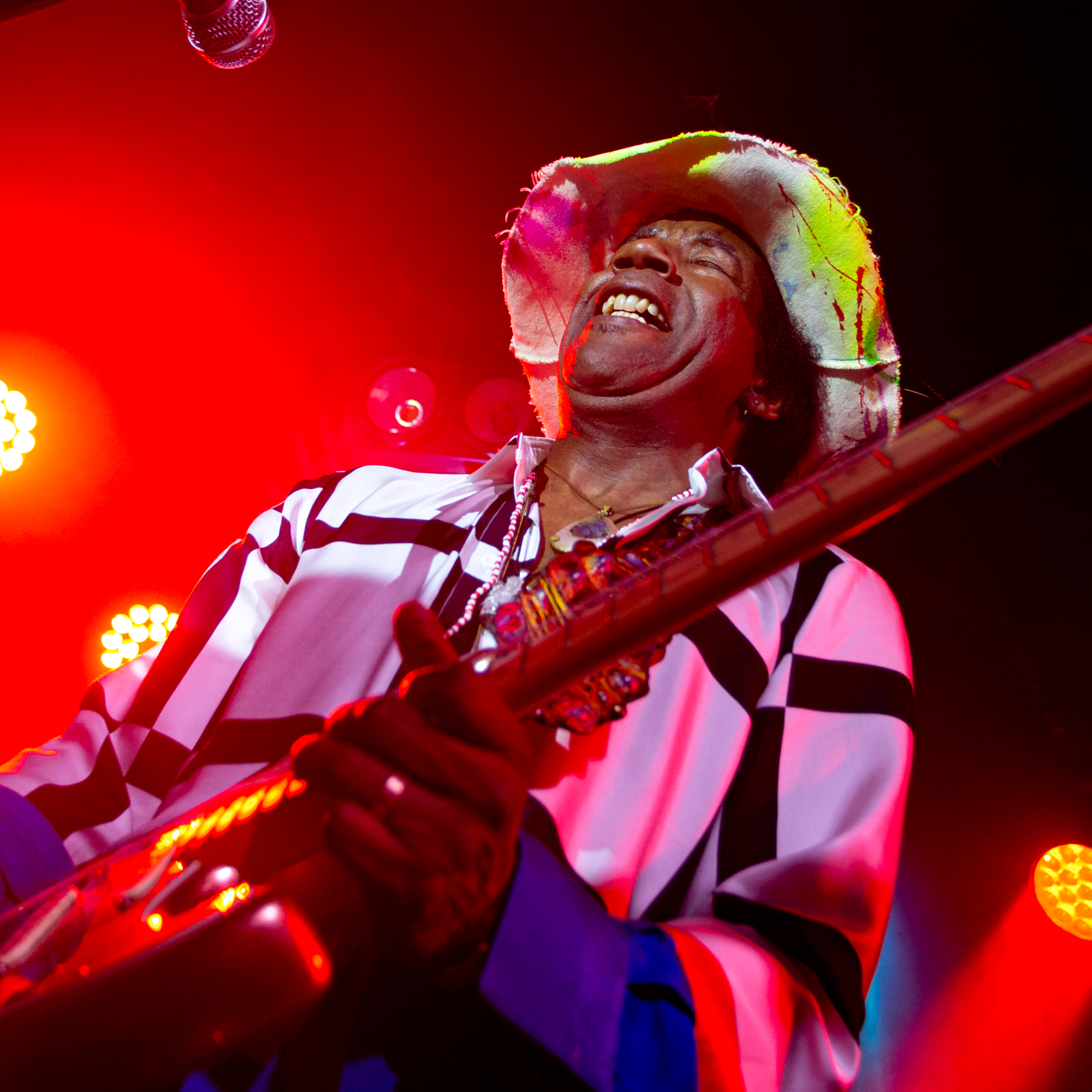
- McLin in March 2026

Ladell McLin is an American blues musician.

== Life ==
McLin was born on the Southside of Chicago, Illinois, to a family of musicians. His mother, singer Marsha McLin, and his father, musician Lamont Braswell, instilled music in Ladell's life from a young age. Braswell, coming from the doo-wop era, had roots with the South Side, Chicago singer bands including The Chi-Lites, of which his cousin, Marshall Thompson, was a founding member. In addition, Braswell worked as a music composer, as well as a jazz drummer, playing with Muddy Waters and Howlin' Wolf. McLin's grandfather was jazz trumpeter Woodrow Braswell who played for Billie Holiday.

== Musical career ==
Beginning around the age of 11, McLin joined with his brother, drummer Andre Cotton, at musical shows at Teresa’s Lounge in Chicago and The Checkerboard Lounge. Cotton taught McLin how to play the drums. McLin himself began making music at the age of 11. This is where McLin learned to play the blues from musicians including Lefty Dizz, Junior Wells, Johny Dollar and Eddie Butler. He played his first concerts in Chicago with Cotton. At the age of 16, McLin began touring with Willie Dixon, and played with Junior Wells, A.C. Reed, and many others. Appearances at the Chicago Blues Festival and the Checkerboard Lounge followed. The guitar became McLin's instrument of choice, and by age 19 he was hired to play with Eddie Burks. McLin subsequently performed in blues venues throughout the Midwest, and continued to learn onstage from those such as Koko Taylor, John Primer, and Buddy Guy. He began playing with Buddy Guy's Legends (1997-1999), Buddy Miles, Vernon Reid, Paul Schafer, John Primer, Johnny Guitar Watson, and for Darryl McDaniels aka "DMC" (Run-D.M.C.) and others. He appeared at New York's Apollo Theater, at the Montreux Jazz Festival with Carlos Santana, B. B. King, and Robert Randolph, and at the Paris Sons d'hiver jazz festival.

In 2001, McLin contributed to the Grammy Award nominated, James Blood Ulmer's album, Memphis Blood: The Sun Sessions.

== Discography ==
=== Albums ===
- 2003: Ladell Mclin & the Lazy Americans – Live at the Bamboo Room (Download-Album)
- 2004: Stand Out (Gigantic Music)
- 2014: I am King (Aztec Music)

=== Compilation contributions ===
- 2006: Stand Out on Relix–February 2006 (Supplement to Relix Magazine)

== Filmography ==
- 2011: The Blues Highway: Part 1
- 2011: The Blues Highway: Part 2
