= The Storm Before the Calm =

Studio album by Alanis Morissette
- Released: June 17, 2022
- Genre: Ambient
- Length: 106:38
- Label: Epiphany; Thirty Tigers
- Producer: Dave Harrington

Alanis Morissette chronology
| Such Pretty Forks in the Mix (2020) | The Storm Before the Calm (2022) | Last Christmas (2023) |

Singles from The Storm Before the Calm
- 1. "Safety—Empath in Paradise" Released: May 18, 2022

The Storm Before the Calm (stylized in all lowercase) is the tenth (and eighth international) studio album by Canadian-American singer-songwriter Alanis Morissette, released June 17, 2022, via Epiphany Music and Thirty Tigers, as well as by RCA Records in Europe. Described as a meditation album, the ambient project was co-written with and produced by Dave Harrington, known for his work in the electronic music duo Darkside. The album is hosted on streaming services and the meditation app Calm.

== Style ==
The Arts Desk's Katie Colombus noted Morissette's "musical journey of self-discovery and healing", going as far back as songs such as "Thank U" from Supposed Former Infatuation Junkie and multiple cuts from Flavors of Entanglement and Havoc and Bright Lights, leading up to the singer "remov[ing] her ego completely" with The Storm, with an album "comprised of long pieces between five and 12 minutes as guidance through our internal machinations." Lead single "Safety—Empath in Paradise" is described as "a guidance for us to think and clarify, as well as feel connected and supported on our own journeys" with "a soothing rhythmic pattern of drumming and a gentle sense of connection in the swell of euphoric voices that join together", while album opener "Light—The Lightworker's Lament" and mid-album cut "Awakening—In Between Thoughts" are "gentler, with sounds of gongs, synthesis and contemplative guitar." Colombus closed by calling the album "calming", "strong in its vulnerability", and "music that traverses the landscape of the self." Uncut's Wyndham Wallace noted "Space—Pause on Violence" as "recalling Julianna Barwick's The Magic Place and called "Mania—Resting in the Fire" "indulgently noisy prog-jazz".

== Reception ==
The Storm Before the Calm ratings
Review scores
| Source | Rating |
|---|---|
| AllMusic | 3/5 stars |
| The Arts Desk | 3/5 stars |
| Clash | 7/10 |
| Uncut | 7/10 |
| Financial Times | 3/5 stars |
| Plattentests.de | 6/10 |
| The Times | 2/5 stars |

Clash's Isabella Miller wrote that while The Storm Before the Calm "may be an unexpected project from one of the worlds [sic] much loved vocalists", the album "is proof that Alanis Morissette offers more than catchy melodies, clever lyricism and reminding us how 'life has a funny way of helping you out when you think everything's gone wrong'" and the artist "exhibits genius musicianship and knows exactly the right way to evoke emotion." Financial Times's Ludovic Hunter-Tilney wrote that "rather than angry songcraft, the results are some really quite decent ambient works" with "a hint of krautrock's cosmic music in 'Safety—Empath in Paradise'" and "Restore—Calling Generation X" being a "chill-out peace offering to the snarky generation of apathetic ironists that Morissette was anomalously born into."

The Times's Will Hodgkinson wrote that meditation "is meant to turn you into a calmer, happier, more accepting person", but that listening to the album "has left me a gibbering, miserable, judgmental wreck" and that the album contains "seemingly endless slabs of ambient ponderousness that wax, wane and go nowhere".

== Track listing ==
All tracks are written by Alanis Morissette and Dave Harrington. All tracks produced by Harrington. All track names stylized in all lowercase.

The Storm Before the Calm track listing
| No. | Title | Length |
|---|---|---|
| 1. | "Light—The Lightworker's Lament" | 5:28 |
| 2. | "Heart—Power of a Soft Heart" | 7:46 |
| 3. | "Explore—The Other Side of Stillness" | 12:01 |
| 4. | "Space—Pause on Violence" | 12:51 |
| 5. | "Purification—The Alchemical Crunch" | 9:10 |
| 6. | "Restore—Calling Generation X" | 9:47 |
| 7. | "Awakening—In Between Thoughts" | 9:42 |
| 8. | "Ground—I Want to Live" | 11:43 |
| 9. | "Safety—Empath in Paradise" | 11:02 |
| 10. | "Mania—Resting in the Fire" | 7:22 |
| 11. | "Vapor—Amplified in Stillness" | 9:46 |
| Total length: | | 106:38 |

== Personnel ==
- Alanis Morissette – vocals, percussion, flute
- Dave Harrington – electric and acoustic guitar, pedal steel guitar, bass, piano, organ, moog, mellotron, drums, congas, percussion, bells, ghaita, sampler, electronics
- Stuart Bogie – clarinet, contralto clarinet, flute, tenor sax, baritone sax
- Mauro Refosco – surdo, tympani, concert toms, synare, udu, tamburelo, tabla, gongs, percussion
- Spencer Zahn – acoustic and electric bass, vibraphone, moog
- Andrew Fox – Korg MS20, electronics (6, 9)
- Tim Mislock – guitar, electronics (1, 4, 10)
- Samer Ghadry – gongs, crystal bowl, himalayan bowls (2)
- Cedric Lemoyne – electric bass (10)
- Victor Indrizzo – drums, percussion, bowed cymbals (10)
- Taylor Deupree – mastering
- Phil Weinrobe – mixing
- Kiukl Adelbai, Tyler Karmen, Chris Dugan – additional engineering
- Rob Prior – cover art

== Charts ==
Chart performance for The Storm Before the Calm
| Chart (2022) | Peak positions |
|---|---|
| Swiss Albums (Schweizer Hitparade) | 26 |
| UK Album Sales (OCC) | 85 |
