= Piedras 1 =

Studio album by Nicolas Jaar
- Released: October 25, 2024
- Length: 45:25
- Label: Other People

Nicolas Jaar chronology
Telas (2020)	Piedras 1 (2024)	Piedras 2 (2024)

Piedras 1 is a studio album by Chilean-American composer and producer Nicolas Jaar. It was released as part of a double album on October 25, 2024, by Other People.

== Background ==
Piedras 1 and its counterpart, Piedras 2, are a collection of tracks used in Jaar's radio play Archivos de Radio Piedras. Its title track "Piedras" (transl. "Stones") was written in advance of a concert performance at the Museum of Memory and Human Rights in Santiago, Chile. It evolved from a commemorative project honoring the victims of the Augusto Pinochet military dictatorship, to an alternative historical fiction narrative complete with a score. Tracks from the double album, primarily Piedras 1, are presented as original works by the main character within the play.

== Track listing ==
All tracks are written by Nicolas Jaar.

No.	Title	Length
1.	"Cangilón"	6:58
2.	"Piedras"	4:37
3.	"Aquí"	4:41
4.	"Agua pa fantasmas"	5:27
5.	"Rio de las tumbas"	5:31
6.	"Viento"	6:55
7.	"Mi viejita"	6:44
8.	"Song of hope"	4:29

== Critical reception ==
Pitchfork gave the double album a score of 8.3 of 10, and its designation of "Best New Music". The Line of Best Fit rated the album 8/10.
