= ARMS (band) =

Indie rock band

- Origin: New York, NY
- Genres: Indie rock Alternative rock
- Years active: 2004–present
- Labels: Melodic Records; Gigantic Music
- Members: Todd Goldstein; Tlacael Esparza; Matty Fasano
- Past members: Brian Betancourt; Joe Posner; Jeff Wood; Dave Harrington
- Website: https://arms.bandcamp.com

ARMS is an American indie rock band from New York in 2004. Originally a solo project created by ex-Harlem Shakes guitarist Todd Goldstein, ARMS has since evolved into a four-piece band, with the inclusion of drummer Tlacael Esparza, bassist Matty Fasano and keyboardist Dave Harrington. Goldstein handles guitar and vocal duties.

== History ==
Goldstein originally started ARMS as a musical outlet for himself when he first moved to Brooklyn. When he joined Harlem Shakes in 2006, ARMS became his side-project, put on the back burner so he could focus on guitar and songwriting duties for his new band. However, he continued to write and record ARMS music in his bedroom during the band's downtime, handling all instrumentation duties himself. Over the course of three years, these single microphone and laptop recording sessions ultimately became ARMS' full-length debut, Kids Aflame. After its release, with Goldstein going into the studio with his bandmates to work on what would become Harlem Shakes' full-length debut and the promotional tour that followed the release of that record, there was little opportunity to promote Kids Aflame. But, despite the lack of promotion, the record still garnered a fair amount of positive attention from critics. It was featured on Paste's list of Eight Criminally Underrated Albums From 2009 and praised for "perfectly encapsulating the daunting search for identity and authenticity."

When Harlem Shakes broke up in the summer of 2009, Goldstein shifted his focus back to his side-project, recruited a band of musicians and, for the first time, ARMS became a collaborative endeavor. This new incarnation of ARMS began writing music together immediately and, in March 2010, released their first EP (aptly titled 'EP') free in digital format online. One of the tracks from the EP, Heat & Hot Water, was remixed by Electropop group, Passion Pit.

ARMS has also opened for Passion Pit in addition to The Walkmen, Japandroids, and White Rabbits. Members of the band performed with LCD Soundsystem at their final concert at Madison Square Garden on April 2, 2011. The band's studio album, 'Summer Skills', was released in November 2011.

Goldstein was also one-half of the now seemingly defunct folk duo, The Sea & The Gulls, which he formed with his friend, Leah Beeferman. Together, they released one album, Things That Fly.

== Discography ==
=== Albums ===
- Kids Aflame (Melodic UK, 2008; later re-released on Gigantic, 2009)
- Summer Skills (released November 8, 2011)
- Patterns (Paper Garden Records, released June 3, 2016)

=== Singles and EPs ===
- Shitty Little Disco EP (self-released, 2006)
- Whirring 7-inch (Melodic, 2007)
- EP (self-released, 2010)
- "EP 2" (Paper Garden Records, 2013)
