= Dave Harrington (musician) =

American musician (born 1985)

- Born: December 31, 1985 (age 40)
- Genres: Electronic, experimental, downtempo, jazz, ambient
- Years active: 2009–present
- Labels: Other People, Matador
- Website: harringtone.com

Dave Harrington is an American multi-instrumentalist, producer and one third of the electronic music trio Darkside, along with Nicolas Jaar and Tlacael Esparza. Harrington attended Brown University where he studied modern culture and media. He played in numerous Brooklyn indie-rock bands including ARMS, Thunder And Lightning, and Translations (which featured Andrew Fox of Visuals). Harrington also scored the 2010 documentary about Pablo Escobar which aired on the BBC. Harrington is based in Los Angeles.

== History ==
=== Early projects ===
Before meeting Jaar, Harrington played in two psychedelic bands, El Topo and Bladerunner Trio which is a break-off band of El Topo. Jaar and Harrington first met while they were both students at Brown University. Harrington was recommended to Jaar by frequent collaborator Will Epstein while he was looking for a third musician for his live band; the three then toured together to support Jaar's 2011 album Space Is Only Noise. Darkside first formed during a Berlin stop on this tour. Jaar and Harrington were writing in their hotel room together when their converter plug popped, filling their room with smoke and forcing them to finish the song in the hallway on a laptop. After returning to New York, they continued to write together and developing their sound in their Brooklyn studio. They released their first collaboration, the self-titled Darkside EP, on 2011 via Jaar's own Clown & Sunset imprint.

Harrington, along with Jaar, released their second Darkside collaboration Random Access Memories Memories on June 21, 2013. The project was uploaded to their SoundCloud account under the pseudonym DaftSide, is a remix of Daft Punk's 2013 album Random Access Memories in its entirety.

=== Influences ===
In a July 28, 2014 interview with Rolling Stone, Harrington mentions that he "grew up in a house where jazz was the musical language." He started out as a jazz bassist, taking lessons at the Harlem School of the Arts from Kelvin Bell of Eighties downtown favorites Defunkt and former Ornette Coleman and Marc Ribot sideman Brad Jones. Harrington notes that his guitar playing is inspired by jazz musicians including Bill Frisell, David Torn, John Zorn, and Jerry Garcia, as well as bands such as King Crimson. He has expressed an affinity for the Grateful Dead's use of MIDI technology in the late 1980s and early 1990s. In 2014, Harrington bonded with Joe Russo at the Brooklyn Is Dead event in New York and the duo have since performed together in numerous configurations.

=== Psychic ===
Darkside's debut album Psychic was released on October 4, 2013. The album was recorded over the course of two years between Jaar's home in New York City, Harrington's family barn in Upstate New York, and a space in Paris where they would stay between tours. The album received critical praise amongst publications and made it on Pitchfork's 2014 "The Top 100 Albums of the Decade" list.

=== Before This There Was One Heart But a Thousand Thoughts ===
On May 12, 2014, Harrington released his first solo EP titled Before This There Was One Heart But a Thousand Thoughts via Nicolas Jaar's Other People imprint. The Village Voice noted that the EP is "concrete and cinematic, reminiscent of the work of Philip Glass and the soundtrack to 2001: A Space Odyssey, as well as more familiar Darkside touchstones like progressive rock and drone."

=== Become Alive ===
Harrington released Become Alive under the Dave Harrington Group name in April 2016. The record was produced by Dave Harrington, Andrew Fox, Samer Ghadry, and Nicolas Jaar; it features several instrumental compositions for ensembles from two to eleven musicians, and covers a variety of genres.

=== Remixes ===
In September 2013, Harrington remixed Nicolas Jaar's "Why Didn't You Save Me" off his 2011 Don't Break My Love EP. Also in 2013, Harrington remixed Tame Impala 's hugely successful "Feels Like We Only Go Backwards" as a "Paradise Edit." Alongside Nicolas Jaar Harrington remixed Daft Punk's Random Access Memories under the pseudonym Daftside and released it on June 21, 2013 as Random Access Memories Memories on Darkside's SoundCloud

At the beginning of 2014, Harrington collaborated with Nicolas Jaar on a "Modcast" mixtape for Modular Recordings. In May 2014, Harrington remixed Small Black's Frankie Rose and assisted on "Lines of Latitude", a single. Other notable remixes by Harrington include Bear in Heaven's "World of Feakout," ILLUMNTR's "RM Butterfly," and his remix of St. Vincent's "Digital Witness" as Darkside.

== Discography ==
with the Dave Harrington Group

- Become Alive (2016)
- Pure Imagination, No Country (2019)

Solo

- Before This There Was One Heart But a Thousand Thoughts EP (2014)
- Skull Dream (2024)

with Darkside

- Darkside (2011)
- Psychic (2013)
- Spiral (2021)
- Nothing (2025)

with Lights Fluorescent

- The Oldest Sons of the Oldest Sons (2019)

with Alanis Morissette

- The Storm Before the Calm (2022)

with Taper's Choice

- Choice Tapes Vol. 1 (May 3, 2022)
- Choice Tapes Vol. 2 (May 3, 2022)
- Choice Tapes Vol. 3 (June 7, 2022)
- Choice Tapes Vol. 4 (July 26, 2022)
