= Technicolor Health =

Studio album by Harlem Shakes
- Released: 24 March 2009
- Genre: Indie
- Label: Gigantic Music

Harlem Shakes chronology
Burning Birthdays (2007)	Technicolor Health (2009)

Technicolor Health is the first and only full-length album from indie band Harlem Shakes.

== Track listing ==
1. "Nothing But Change Part II"
2. "Strictly Game"
3. "TFO"
4. "Niagara Falls"
5. "Sunlight"
6. "Unhurried Hearts (Passaic Pastoral)"
7. "Winter Water"
8. "Natural Man"
9. "Radio Orlando"
10. "Technicolor Health"
