= Harlem Shakes =

American indie rock band

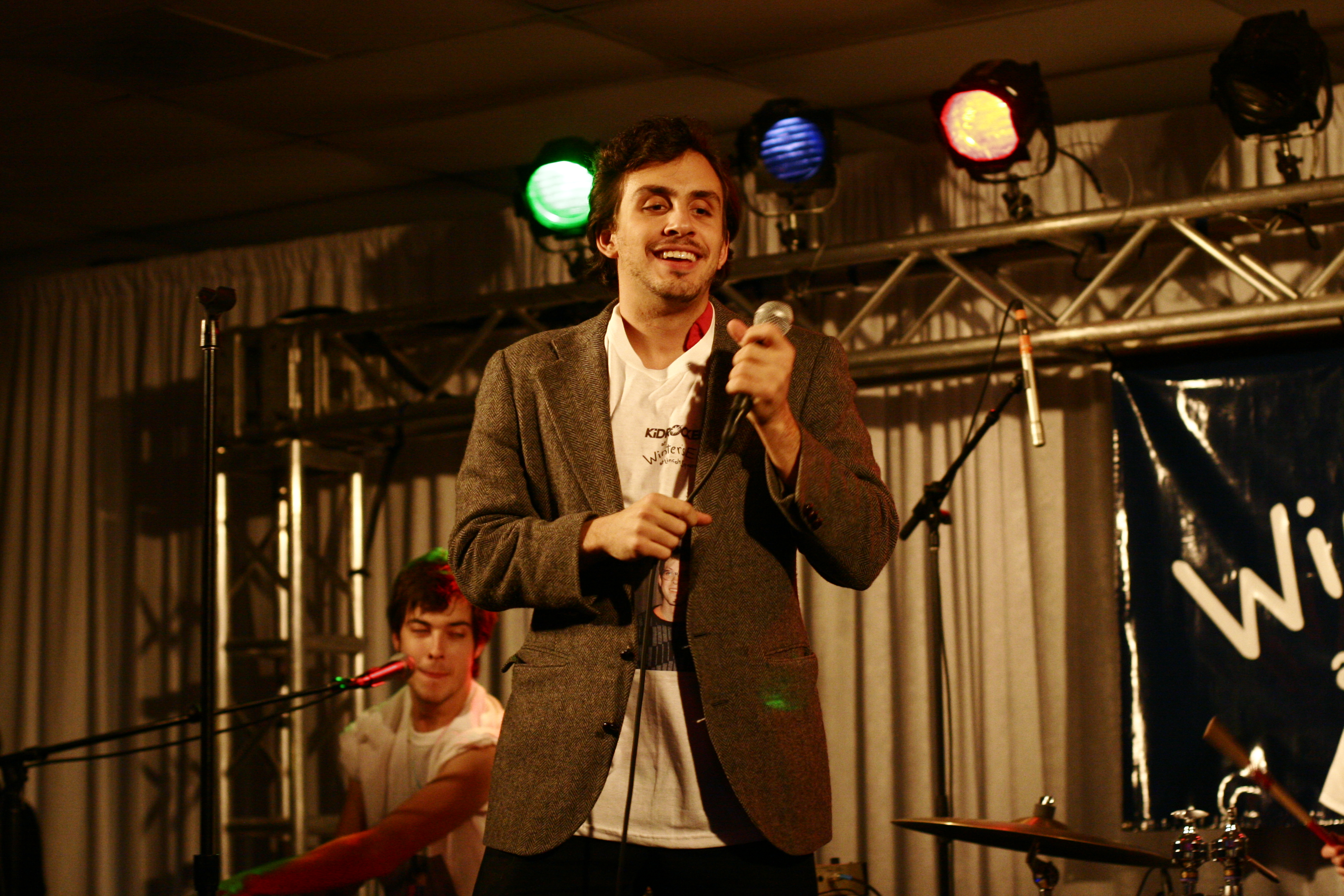
- Harlem Shakes performing in 2007

Background information
- Origin: New York, NY
- Genres: Alternative rock; indie rock
- Years active: 2006–2009
- Labels: Gigantic Music
- Members: Lexy Benaim; Todd Goldstein; Jose Soegaard; Kendrick Strauch; Brent Katz

Harlem Shakes were an American indie rock band from New York, formed in 2006 and signed to Gigantic Music. Prior to their signing, they released the 2007 EP Burning Birthdays. The band disbanded in September 2009 after a hiatus following the release of their first full-length album, Technicolor Health.

The group's guitarist, Todd Goldstein, is still actively producing music under the name ARMS. The group's drummer, Brent Katz, is also still actively involved in the indie music scene. Katz continues to produce music in his solo/side-project, Thunder & Lightning, which has released an album entitled Kangaroo Court.

== Discography ==
=== Studio albums ===
- Technicolor Health (2009)

=== EPs ===
- Burning Birthdays (2007)
