= Nothing (Darkside album) =

Studio album by Darkside
- Released: February 28, 2025
- Studio: La Fabrique (St-Rémy-de-Provence); Henson (Los Angeles); Whitaker 64 (Los Angeles); Loom (Paris)
- Genre: Electronic; art rock
- Length: 44:24
- Label: Matador
- Producer: Darkside

Darkside chronology
Spiral (2021)	Nothing (2025)

Singles from Nothing
- 1. "Graucha Max" Released: 21 October 2024; 2. "S.N.C" Released: 8 January 2025; 3. "Are You Tired? (Keep on Singing)" Released: 6 February 2025; 4. "Hell suite, Pt. II" Released: 25 February 2025

Nothing is the third studio album by the American electronic music trio Darkside, released on February 28, 2025 via Matador Records. It is their first album to feature Tlacael Esparza, who joined the band as the third member.

== Background ==
Following the release of Spiral in 2021, Darkside recruited drummer Tlacael Esparza to become a full-time member. In 2022, Darkside began rehearsing material for Nothing in a Los Angeles storefront dubbed "The Spiral House".

== Critical reception ==
Professional ratings
Aggregate scores
Source	Rating
Metacritic	75/100
Review scores
Source	Rating
Pitchfork	7.8/10
musicOMH	4.5/5 stars
The Skinny	4/5 stars

On the review aggregate site Metacritic, Nothing has a rating of 75 out of 100 based on 7 reviews, indicating "generally favorable" reviews.

== Track listing ==
All tracks are written by Dave Harrington, Nicolás Jaar, and Tlacael Esparza.

Nothing track listing
No.	Title	Length
1.	"SLAU"	5:21
2.	"S.N.C"	5:55
3.	"Are You Tired? (Keep on Singing)"	6:44
4.	"Graucha Max"	5:35
5.	"American References"	6:01
6.	"Heavy Is Good for This"	3:56
7.	"Hell Suite, Pt. I"	3:22
8.	"Hell Suite, Pt. II"	3:48
9.	"Sin El Sol No Hay Nada"	3:38
Total length:		44:24

== Personnel ==
Credits adapted from the album's liner notes.

=== Darkside ===
- Dave Harrington – production, electric guitars, acoustic guitars, bass, congas, sampler, electronics, Hammond organ, Fender Rhodes, synthesizers
- Nicolás Jaar – production, sequencing, editing, sampling, arrangement, vocals, Fender Rhodes, Wurlitzer, synthesizers
- Tlacael Esparza – production, drum set, sensory percussion, bongos, percussion, model training, sound design

=== Additional contributors ===
- Pantxo Bertin – co-production, mastering, engineering
- Daniel Cayotte – engineering
- Tyler Karmen – engineering
- Robin Cordier – engineering
- Caroline Whitaker – engineering assistance
- Jed DeMoss – photography
- Alison Fielding – design
