= Spiral (Darkside album) =

Studio album by Darkside
- Released: July 23, 2021
- Genre: Electronic
- Length: 51:46
- Label: Matador
- Producer: Darkside

Darkside chronology
Psychic (2013)	Spiral (2021)	Nothing (2025)

Singles from Spiral
- 1. "Liberty Bell" Released: December 21, 2020; 2. "The Limit" Released: April 8, 2021; 3. "Lawmaker" Released: June 2, 2021

Spiral is the second studio album by electronic music duo Darkside, consisting of Nicolás Jaar and Dave Harrington, released on July 23, 2021 via Matador Records. It was one of Pitchfork's 41 Most Anticipated Albums of 2021.

== Production ==
Following the critically-successful Psychic in 2014 and a tour that concluded at Brooklyn Masonic Temple during September of that same year, Darkside members Harrington and Jaar branched individual pursuits – Harrington focusing as composer for two albums made under Dave Harrington Group and Jaar pursuing two collections as Against All Logic and five solo releases.

Reconvening, the album was written and recorded in 2018, with six of the songs largely made through an extended week-long session during the summer in Flemington, NJ. It would take another year and half for the entire album to coalesce completely.

Harrington discussed the idiosyncratic interactions that take place when the two converge together, stating "it felt like it was time; we do things in this band that we would never do on our own". Agreeing, Jaar explained the gravitation that they had shared toward the collaborative project: "we couldn't wait to jam together again".

== Release ==
In December 2020, Darkside announced their second album would be released in the spring of 2021. At that time, they also released the song "Liberty Bell", which was their first studio release since 2014, breaking a six-year hiatus.

The album was ultimately pushed back to July 23, 2021, and Matador published another song "The Limit" in April 2021. In June, a third song "Lawmaker" was released.

== Critical reception ==
Professional ratings
Aggregate scores
Source	Rating
AnyDecentMusic?	7.7/10
Metacritic	79/100
Review scores
Source	Rating
AllMusic	4/5 stars
Exclaim!	9/10
The Line of Best Fit	7/10
Loud and Quiet	8/10
NME	4/5 stars
Paste	8.2/10
Pitchfork	6.8/10
PopMatters	6/10
The Skinny	4/5 stars
Slant Magazine	3/5 stars

Upon its release, Spiral received generally favorable reviews. At Metacritic, which assigns a weighted average score out of 100 to reviews and ratings from mainstream critics, the album has received a metascore of 79, based on 16 reviews, indicating "generally favourable reviews".

== Track listing ==
All tracks are written by Nicolás Jaar and Dave Harrington.

Spiral track listing
No.	Title	Length
1.	"Narrow Road"	6:15
2.	"The Limit"	5:21
3.	"The Question Is to See It All"	5:08
4.	"Lawmaker"	5:49
5.	"I'm the Echo"	5:08
6.	"Spiral"	4:58
7.	"Liberty Bell"	4:02
8.	"Inside Is Out There"	8:35
9.	"Only Young"	6:30
Total length:		51:46

== Personnel ==
Darkside

- Dave Harrington
- Nicolás Jaar

Additional personnel

- Rashad Becker – mixing
- Heba Kadry – mastering

== Charts ==
Chart performance for Spiral
Chart (2021)	Peak position
Belgian Albums (Ultratop Flanders)	40
Belgian Albums (Ultratop Wallonia)	74
Dutch Albums (Album Top 100)	82
Scottish Albums (Official Charts)	76
Swiss Albums (Schweizer Hitparade)	24
