= W. H. Lung =

- Origin: Manchester, England
- Genre: Rock
- Label: Melodic Records
- Member of: Joseph E, Tom S, Tom P
- Website: whlung.bandcamp.com

W. H. Lung is a British dance-rock and synth-pop band from Manchester, England (named after a local Chinese supermarket)

== History ==
W. H. Lung's debut album Incidental Music, was released on 5 April 2019, selling out both its limited clear vinyl and its DINKED edition. The debut album received positive reviews from Loud & Quiet, Q Magazine, Mojo, Uncut and The Guardian. The record was named #1 Album of the year by UK record shops Piccadilly Records and Resident.

Vanities, the second album from W. H. Lung was released to acclaim from outlets including Stereogum, The Times and Paste.

== Critical reception ==
Writing for The Guardian, Michael Hann wrote that the band "blur[s] high and low culture" and was able to "create songs that are fresh and exciting yet familiar-sounding and accessible."
