= The Builders and the Butchers =

American folk rock band

The Builders and The Butchers
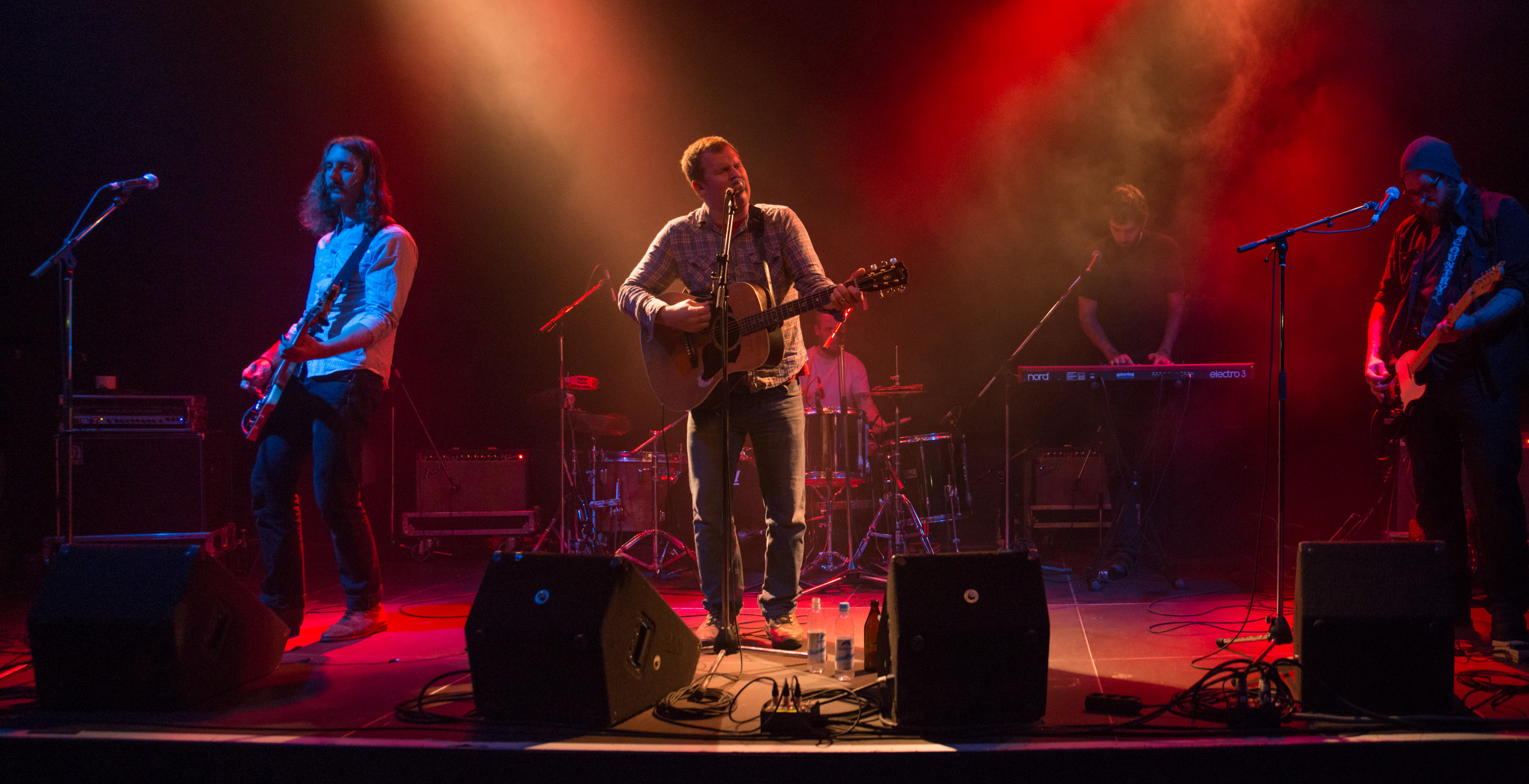
- The Builders and the Butchers playing live 2014 in Munich.

Background information
- Origin: Portland, Oregon, United States
- Genres: Folk rock, indie folk, Americana, roots rock
- Years active: 2005–present
- Labels: Bladen County Records, Gigantic Music, Badman Recording Co., Song, by Toad Records
- Members: Justin Baier; Willy Kunkle; Ray Rude; Ryan Sollee; Harvey Tumbleson
- Past members: Alexander Ellis; Brandon Hafer; Adrienne Hatkin; Paul Seely
- Website: TheBuildersAndTheButchers.com

The Builders and The Butchers are a folk rock band based in Portland, Oregon, United States. It is fronted by singer/guitar player Ryan Sollee. The other members of the band are Willy Kunkle (bass guitar, vocals, percussion), Justin Baier (drums, backup vocals, percussion), Ray Rude (drums, piano, clarinet, backup vocals, percussion), and Harvey Tumbleson (mandolin, banjo, guitar, vocals, percussion).

The band's debut self-titled album was released in 2007 by Bladen County Records.

To date, the band has six full-length albums, two live albums and two EP splits.

== History ==
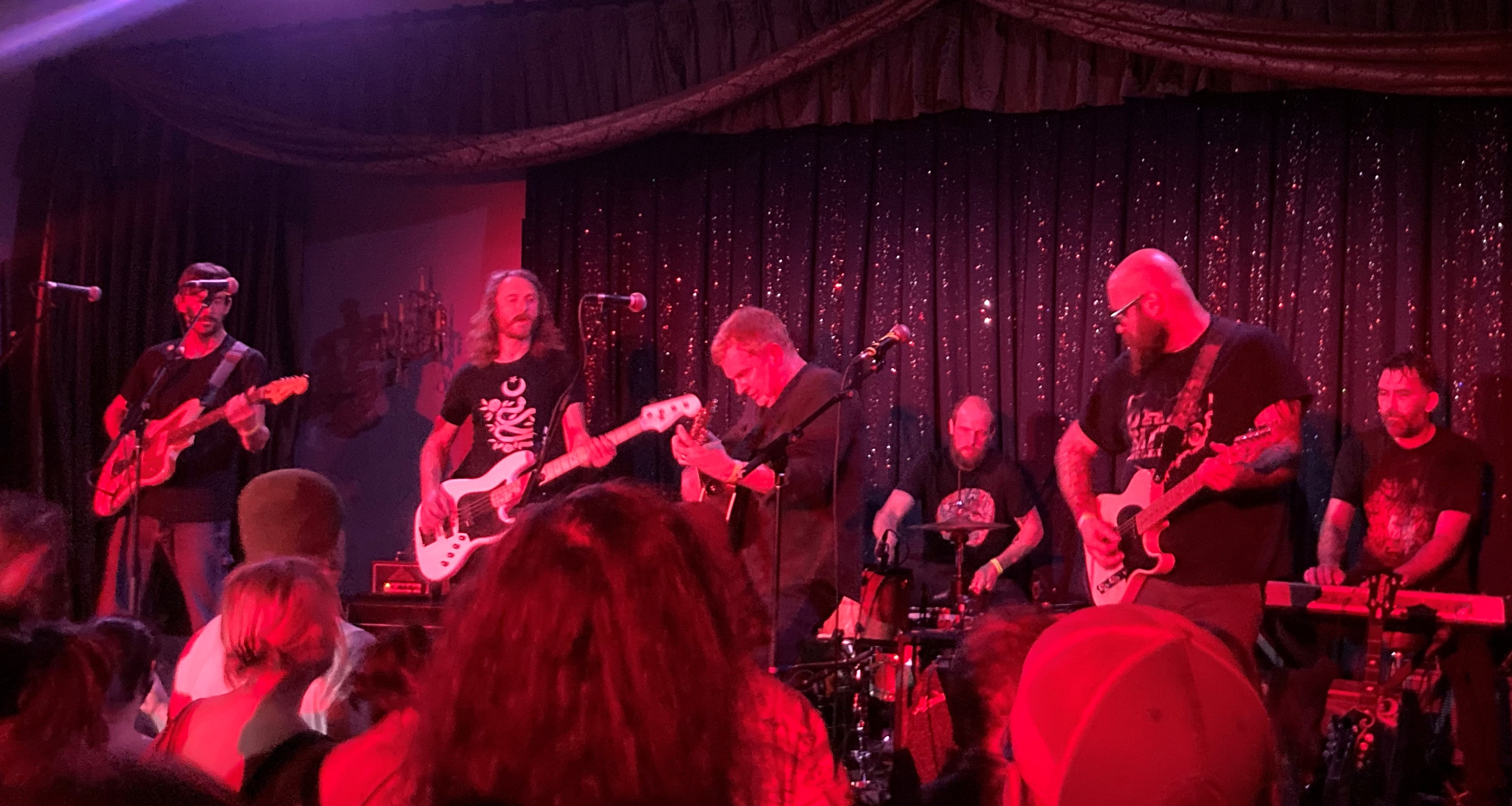
Polaris Hall, 2022

The Builders and The Butchers formed on October 31, 2005. They came together because "a lot of bands were all breaking up around the same time, and we were looking to get into something new—so it just worked out."

Each member is originally from Anchorage, Alaska and migrated separately to Portland, Oregon to start a career in music.

Initially they called themselves "The Funeral Band", performing in the streets and outside of music venues. The name eventually changed to The Builders and The Butchers, "for no other reason than it was the only name all five members liked." The first year of acoustic performances were mostly street shows until opening for the experimental band Man Man in 2006. "We very slowly started plugging [our instruments] in." Sollee says, but the group had to figure out how to use its two percussionists on stage. They found that by splitting one drum kit between Seely and Rude, with one handling the kick drum and another playing the snare, they developed what the group calls a "deconstructed" drumming style.

The band's song-writing process involves Sollee writing the lyrics out and presenting it to the other members, who then start playing and putting the music around these lyrics.

In May 2008 the band won the Willamette Week's "Best New Band of 2008" and Seattle Sound's "Best Live Performers 2008".

In late 2010, The Builders and the Butchers signed with Badman Recording Co. and released their third album, Dead Reckoning on February 22, 2011.

== Artwork ==
The Builders and The Butchers' album artwork is produced by Portland, Oregon artist Lukas Ketner.

== Members ==
=== Current ===
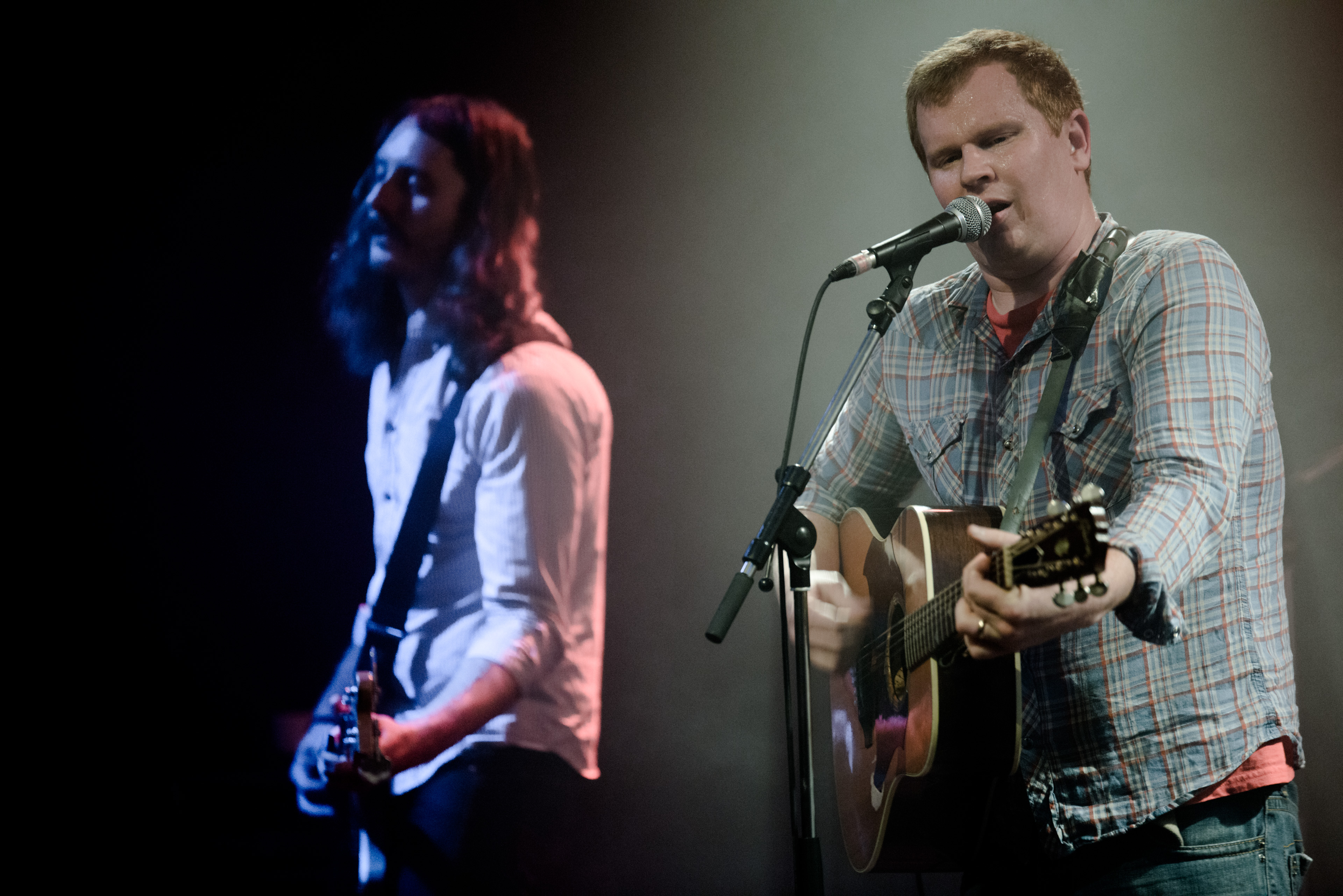
Willy Kunkle (left) and Ryan Sollee, Live in Munich 2014

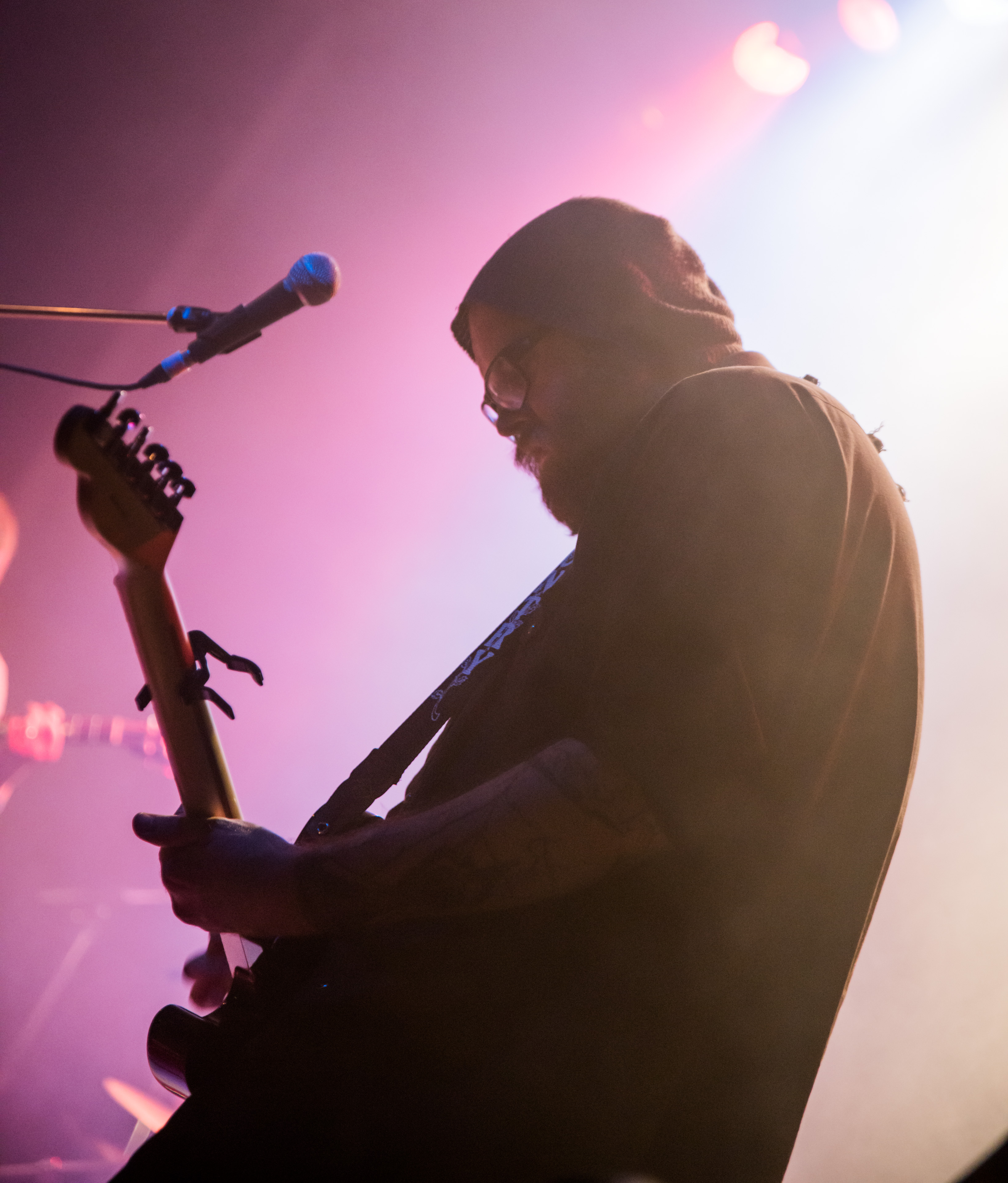
Harvey Tumbleson, Live in Munich 2014

- Justin Baier (drums, backup vocals, percussion)
- Willy Kunkle (bass guitar, vocals, percussion)
- Ray Rude (drums, piano, clarinet, backup vocals, percussion)
- Ryan Sollee (lead vocals, guitar, percussion)
- Harvey Tumbleson (mandolin, banjo, guitar, vocals, percussion)

=== Former ===
- Alex Ellis (bass guitar, vocals, percussion) – "The Builders and The Butchers", "Loch Lomond/The Builders and The Butchers" 12-inch Split, "Salvation is a Deep Dark Well","Dead Reckoning"
- Brandon Hafer (drums, trumpet, melodica, backup vocals, percussion)
- Adrienne Hatkin (mandolin, banjo, accordion, vocals, percussion) – live shows
- Paul Seely (drums, trumpet, melodica, backup vocals, percussion) – "The Builders and The Butchers", "Loch Lomond/The Builders and The Butchers" 12-inch Split, "Salvation is a Deep Dark Well"

=== Guests ===
- Annalisa Tornfelt (violin, backup vocals) for "The Builders and The Butchers", "Loch Lomond/The Builders and The Butchers" 12-inch Split, "Salvation is a Deep Dark Well"
- Emily Tornfelt (cello) for "Salvation is a Deep Dark Well"
- Tyler Tornfelt (cello) for "Loch Lomond/The Builders and The Butchers" 12-inch Split
- Skip Von Kuske (cello) for "Loch Lomond/The Builders and The Butchers" 12-inch Split
- Douglas Jenkins (cello) for "Salvation is a Deep Dark Well"
- Justin Kagen (cello) for "Salvation is a Deep Dark Well"
- Joe Bowden (backup vocals) for "Salvation is a Deep Dark Well"
- Sean Flynn (backup vocals) for "Salvation is a Deep Dark Well"
- Jesse Bettis (backup vocals) for "Salvation is a Deep Dark Well"
- Scott Magee (bass clarinet, backup vocals) for "Salvation is a Deep Dark Well"
- Sebastian Bibb Barrett (trumpet) for "Salvation is a Deep Dark Well"
- Victor Nash (trumpet, French horn) for "Salvation is a Deep Dark Well"
- Amanda Lawrence (viola) for "Salvation is a Deep Dark Well"
- Chris Funk ([backup vocals]) for "Salvation is a Deep Dark Well"
- Mike Anzalone (castanets, backup vocals)for "Loch Lomond/The Builders and The Butchers" 12-inch Split, "Salvation is a Deep Dark Well"
- The Flash Choir for "Salvation is a Deep Dark Well"
- The Gospel Choir for "Salvation is a Deep Dark Well"
- The Portland Cello Project – live shows

== Discography ==
=== Albums ===
Title	Date	Label
The Builders and The Butchers	2007	Bladen County Records
Loch Lomond/The Builders and the Butchers Split 12-inch	2007	Bladen County Records(USA) / Song, by Toad Records(UK)
Salvation Is a Deep Dark Well	2009	Gigantic Music
Where the Roots All Grow	2010	Self Released
Dead Reckoning	2011	Badman Recording Co.
Murder By Death/The Builders and The Butchers Split 7-inch	2011	Self Released
Western Medicine	2013	Badman Recording Co.
The Spark	2017	Badman Recording Co.
Live from Doug Fir	2017	None (Released by Banana Stand Media)
Hell & High Water	2022	Badman Recording Co.
No Tomorrow	2026	Badman Recording Co.
