= Gringo Star =

American indie rock group

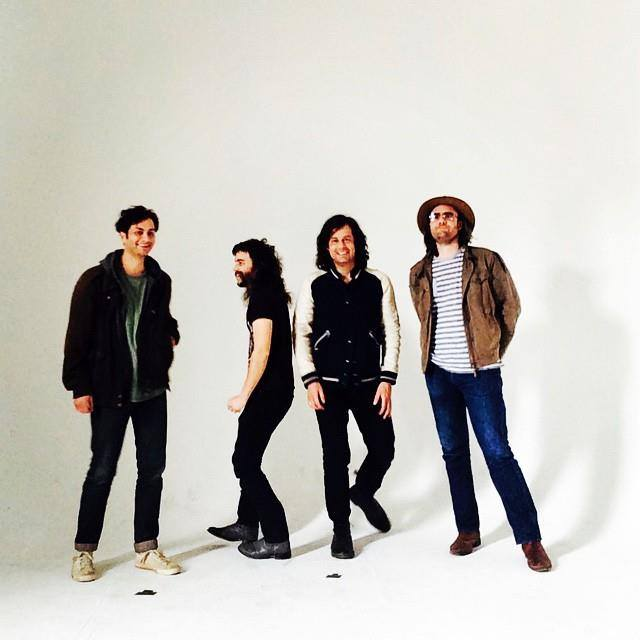
- Gringo Star

Background information
- Origin: Atlanta, Georgia, U.S.
- Genres: Indie rock
- Years active: 2008–present
- Labels: Nevado; Gigantic; Cargo; My Anxious Mouth, Inc.; Dizzybird
- Members: Nicholas Furgiuele; Peter Furgiuele; Jonathan Bragg ("JB"); Josh Longino
- Past members: Peter Delorenzo; Matt McCalvin; Christopher Kaufmann; Lightnin' Ray Jackson
- Website: gringostar.net

Gringo Star is an American indie rock group from Atlanta, Georgia.

== Career ==
The Furgiuele brothers were born in Atlanta to Peggy Mendel and Sam Furgiuele. They grew up in Boone, North Carolina, before returning to the city after High School in 2002. The group was founded in late 2007 by brothers Nicholas and Peter Furgiuele, previously of A Fir-Ju Well. They were joined by Peter Delorenzo and Matt McCalvin. This line-up recorded a self-titled EP.

Gringo Star's debut album All Y'all was self-released in 2008 and subsequently distributed in Europe by Cargo Records in 2010. It was produced by Ben H. Allen. The album was described in by Pitchfork as "the songs are strong, but it's the sweat that will need to do the convincing" while PopMatters found it resembling The Kinks.

The band signed to Brooklyn-based record label Gigantic Music for Count Yer Lucky Stars, released on October 25, 2011. It was also produced by Allen and engineered by James Salter. Rolling Stone called it "modern garage-rock" with "newfound psychedelic, meandering impulses". Popmatters found it "lacks the sense of fun", while Consequence of Sound described the album as having "simple, driving hooks and catchy songwriting". The album made many lists for one of the best albums of the year. The song "Shadow" from Count Yer Lucky Stars was featured on NPR's All Songs Considered in its 2011 Fall Music Preview.

The band was featured in a 2011 documentary, Hurry up and Wait. McCalvin was replaced by Christopher Kaufmann soon afterwards. Delorenzo left the band in the following year.

The band released the album Floating Out To See which they recorded, mixed, and produced themselves at Studio 234 Atlanta, released on October 22nd, 2013, on their own label: My Anxious Mouth Records. This album also garnered positive attention, with some music writers picking it as one of the 10 best albums of the year and one saying that it was a "testament of what can be done if you take a risk or simply use your imagination." Their song "Find a Love" from Floating Out to See was featured as the "Song of the Day" by KEXP. Amazing for a self-released album from an independent band, the album reached #29 on the CMJ Top 200 charts and #13 on the FMQB Submodern Charts. Kaufmann left the band in 2013.

In 2014, Gringo Star released a 7-inch vinyl record issued by Dizzybird Records out of Grand Rapids, Michigan, featuring "Long Time Gone" and "World of Spin," the latter premiered by Paste Magazine on September 18, 2014.

Gringo Star announced in March 2015 the band had completed its fourth full-length album. It previewed a single from the album, "Undone," on May 22, 2015 on Pop Matters. During its annual pilgrimage to SXSW in 2016, Gringo Star signed with Nevado Music. The full album, "The Sides and In Between," was released on August 26, 2016. The first video release from the album, the song "Rotten," is currently on view at Pure Volume.

Gringo Star has been profiled in Spin and several times has recorded at Daytrotter and Paste Magazine.

In 2013, Nicholas Furiuele married Julia while Peter is married to Anna Barattin, both are members of the band Shantih Shantih.

== Style ==
Paste magazine described the band as a "tapestry of (..) psychedelia, garage rock (and) surf pop".

== Live performances ==
Early in their career, the band performed as a backing band for Aria Cavaliere. Gringo Star has shared the stage with numerous other groups and musicians, including Best Coast, the Black Lips, and J Roddy Walston and the Business. In 2012, the band played the Super Bowl Village. Gringo Star has played many music festivals, including Lollapalooza, Secret Stages, Bunbury, Forecastle, SunFest, Northside Festival, and Big Guava Festival. The band toured in April and May 2015 in support of Brian Bell's (Weezer) band, The Relationship, subsequently co-headlining with Dreamers in May and June 2015. The band headlined the Candler Park, Atlanta "Fallfest" in October 2015. It was featured at Harvestfest in Ocala, Florida in November 2015. Gringo Star opened two shows for The Zombies. They regularly perform at SXSW. On August 10, 2016, Gringo Star embarked on a three-month nationwide tour, beginning in Charlotte, North Carolina on August 10, 2016.

== Personnel ==
Current

- Nicholas Furgiuele
- Peter Furgiuele
- Josh Longino
- Mario Colangelo

Past

- Peter Delorenzo
- Matt McCalvin
- Christopher Kaufmann
- Nick Klar
- Lightnin' Ray Jackson
- JT Hall
- Jonathon Bragg aka JB

== Discography ==
Albums

- All Y'all (2008)
- Count Yer Lucky Stars (2011) (Worldwide 2012)
- Floating Out to See (2013)
- The Sides and In Between (2016)
- Back to the City (2018)
- On and On and Gone (2023)
- Sweethearts (2025)

EP's, Singles & live albums

- Gringo Star (6 songs, 5 of which are unique to this EP, and an early version of "Transmission") (2007)
- "Long Time Gone"/"World of Spin" (2 non-LP songs) (2014)
- Controlled Burn (Live in Atlanta) (2019)
- "Shot in the Back" (non-LP instrumental single) (2021)
