= Psychic (album) =

Studio album by Darkside
- Released: October 4, 2013
- Genre: Electronic
- Length: 45:08
- Label: Matador; Other People
- Producer: Darkside

Darkside chronology
| Psychic (2013) | Spiral (2021) |

Singles from Psychic
- 1. "Heart" Released: November 18, 2013; 2. "Paper Trails" Released: March 17, 2014

Psychic is the debut studio album by electronic music duo Darkside, consisting of Nicolás Jaar and Dave Harrington. It was released on October 4, 2013, on Matador Records.

== Critical reception ==
Professional ratings
Aggregate scores
| Source | Rating |
|---|---|
| AnyDecentMusic? | 7.8/10 |
| Metacritic | 79/100 |
Review scores
| Source | Rating |
| AllMusic | 3.5/5 stars |
| The Guardian | 4/5 stars |
| The Irish Times | 4/5 stars |
| Mixmag | 4/5 |
| Mojo | 4/5 stars |
| NME | 7/10 |
| The Observer | 3/5 stars |
| Pitchfork | 9.0/10 |
| Resident Advisor | 3.5/5 |
| Spin | 8/10 |

Upon its release, Psychic received critical acclaim. At Metacritic, which assigns a weighted average score out of 100 to reviews and ratings from mainstream critics, the album has received a metascore of 79, based on 22 reviews, indicating "generally favorable reviews".

=== Accolades (Year-end) ===
| Publication | Country | Accolade | Rank | (out of) | Link |
|---|---|---|---|---|---|
| Bleep | UK | Albums of the Year 2013 | N/A | (47) | |
| Consequence of Sound | US | Consequence of Sound's Top 50 Albums of 2013 | 21 | (50) | |
| Crack | UK | Albums of the Year | 15 | (100) | |
| Line of Best Fit | UK | Best Fit Fifty: Albums of 2013 | 47 | (50) | |
| Pitchfork | US | The Top 50 Albums of 2013 | 11 | (50) | |
| Pitchfork | US | 2013 Readers Poll Results | 12 | (50) | |
| Pretty Much Amazing | | PMA's 40 Best Albums of 2013 | 39 | (40) | |

N/A denotes that the albums are unranked in the list.

=== Accolades (Decade) ===
Additionally, the album was listed in some full decade lists of best albums in the 2010s.

| Publication | Country | Accolade | Rank | (out of) | Link |
|---|---|---|---|---|---|
| Noisy by Vice | CAN / US | The 100 Best Albums of the 2010s | 82 | (100) | |

== Track listing ==
All tracks are written by Nicolás Jaar and Dave Harrington.

| No. | Title | Length |
|---|---|---|
| 1. | "Golden Arrow" | 11:21 |
| 2. | "Sitra" | 1:23 |
| 3. | "Heart" | 4:58 |
| 4. | "Paper Trails" | 4:50 |
| 5. | "The Only Shrine I've Seen" | 7:56 |
| 6. | "Freak, Go Home" | 6:37 |
| 7. | "Greek Light" | 2:55 |
| 8. | "Metatron" | 5:08 |
| Total length: | | 45:08 |

== Personnel ==
Credits adapted from the liner notes of Psychic.

Darkside

- Dave Harrington – production, writing, guitars, bass, acoustic bass, organ, electric piano, pianet, synthesizers, clarinet, drum machines, percussion, electronics, effects
- Nicolás Jaar – production, writing, vocals, sequencing, drum programming, synthesizers, wurlitzer, mellotron, drum machines, percussion, electronics, effects, mixing

Additional personnel

- Brian Gardner – mastering
- Matt de Jong – design, layout
- Jed DeMoss – photography

== Charts ==
| Chart (2013) | Peak position |
|---|---|
| UK Independent Albums (OCC) | 21 |
| US Billboard 200 | 163 |
| US Top Dance/Electronic Albums (Billboard) | 6 |
