= Eddie Burks (blues musician) =

American musician

- Also known as: Jewtown Eddie
- Born: September 17, 1931; Greenwood, Mississippi
- Died: January 27, 2005 (aged 73) Miller, Indiana
- Genres: Blues
- Instruments: singing, harmonica
- Years active: 1960s–2000s

Eddie Burks (September 17, 1931 – January 27, 2005) was an American blues harmonica player and singer, well known for playing in Maxwell Street Market, Chicago, in the 1960s and 1970s, whose later career included a number of album releases, frequent touring, and work on the festival circuit.

== Life and career ==
Burks was born on September 17, 1931, near Greenwood, Mississippi, the 14th and youngest child in a family of sharecroppers. When he was a child one of his brothers was lynched by the Ku Klux Klan.

After moving to Chicago in 1946 he worked in a steel mill. While he did not perform blues because of his religious beliefs, he often attended clubs on the West Side of Chicago. In addition to his steel mill job, Burks was a minister in the Apostolic faith and had a storefront church, but he switched to playing blues full-time after the riots precipitated by the assassination of Martin Luther King Jr. in April 1968.

He played so often on Maxwell Street Market in the late 1960s and 1970s that he became known as "Jewtown Eddie", after the local name for the area. During this period he also worked as a sideman with the likes of Eddie Shaw and Jimmy Dawkins. He released his first single, "Lowdown Dog", in 1977, and this was followed up by two further releases. However, Burks remained largely unknown outside Chicago until 1990 when he released his debut album Vampire Woman on Rising Son Records (later renamed Rising Son Blues), a label he founded with his wife Maureen Walker. Following this, his solo career took off, and he released further albums, toured frequently, and gained steady work on the festival circuit. In 1994 he appeared in the Academy Award nominated documentary Blues Highway.

After his 70th birthday his health declined as a result of diabetes, but he continued to play in the Chicago clubs until his death in a car accident near Miller, Indiana on January 27, 2005.
