= Darkside (band) =

American electronica band

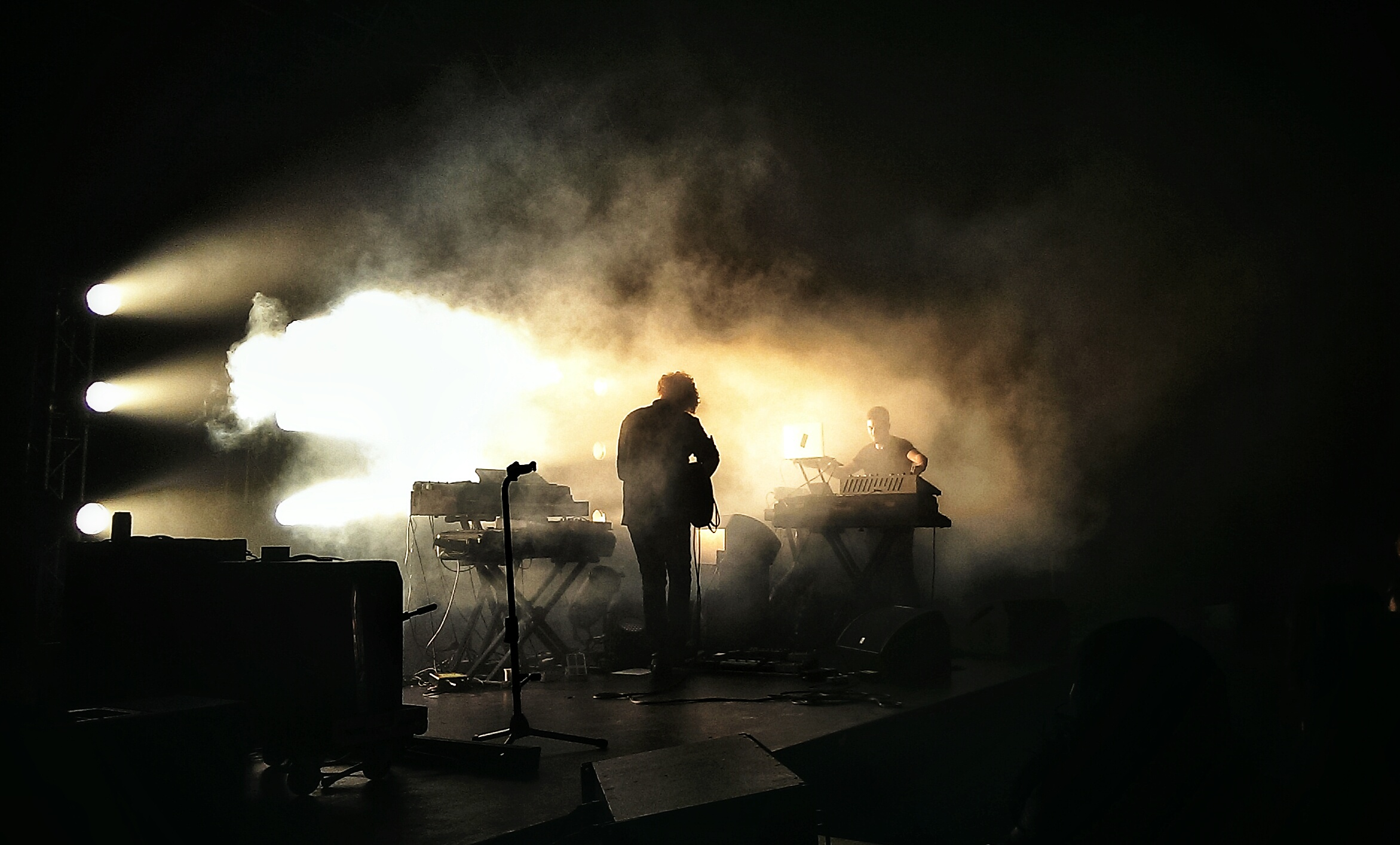
- Darkside performing in Singapore in April 2014

Background information
- Origin: Providence, Rhode Island, U.S.
- Genres: Electronica, experimental, downtempo, ambient
- Years active: 2011–2014; 2018–present
- Labels: Clown & Sunset, Other People, Matador, Modular, Hostess
- Members: Nicolás Jaar; Dave Harrington; Tlacael Esparza
- Website: www.darksidetheband.com

Darkside (often stylized as DARKSIDE) is an American band based in New York City. The band was formed in Providence, Rhode Island in 2011 by electronic musician Nicolás Jaar and multi-instrumentalist Dave Harrington, both of whom were students at Brown University at the time. Their debut studio album, Psychic, was released in 2013 and was followed up by Spiral, released in 2021 after a lengthy hiatus.

In 2022, the band added drummer and percussionist Tlacael Esparza to its core line-up, ahead of the release of Live at Spiral House, an album consisting of improvised material recorded at the band's Los Angeles-based rehearsal space. Their first studio album as a trio, Nothing, was released in February 2025.

== History ==
=== 2011–2014: Origins, Darkside and Psychic ===
Jaar and Harrington first met while they were both students at Brown University. Harrington was recommended to Jaar by frequent collaborator Will Epstein when Jaar was looking for a third musician for his live band, with the three subsequently touring together to support Jaar's 2011 album Space Is Only Noise. On an off day during the tour, Jaar and Harrington began recording together in their Berlin hotel room for several hours until a cheap converter caused their speakers to blow, filling their room with smoke; the song would later become A1.

Upon returning to the United States they continued to write and record together, developing their sound in Providence and New York.

Their first release as Darkside, the three-song Darkside EP, was released on November 17, 2011, via Clown & Sunset. It was critically well received, receiving positive reviews from several publications, including The Fader and Resident Advisor, as well as an 8.0 from Pitchfork. Jaar has described the project as blues-oriented and more guitar influenced than his previous work, stating in an interview with i-D magazine that Darkside is "the closest thing to rock & roll I've ever done." Stereogum has described the duo's sound as "dubbed-out jazzbo junkyard fuzz."

The duo debuted their live show in December 2011 to a sold-out crowd at Music Hall of Williamsburg, stretching their three-song EP into an hour-long set. They also played at the 2012 SXSW festival. Pitchfork has credited the project with allowing Jaar to transition forward into a "proggier and more narcotic-sounding" space while still maintaining his unique aesthetic, in part due to Harrington's influence. The Fader also noted Harrington's contributions, stating that he "adds weight" to Jaar's signature "airy" sound. Darkside released their first music video in May 2012 for "A1", which was directed by Ryan Staake of Pomp&Clout and Clown & Sunset Aesthetics.

The duo released their second collaboration Random Access Memories Memories on June 20, 2013. The project, which was uploaded to a SoundCloud account under the pseudonym DaftSide, is a remix of Daft Punk's 2013 album Random Access Memories in its entirety. The remix album received positive reviews from critics and was described as "a dark, nearly industrial romp through a disjointed abandoned disco" by Death and Taxes. Pitchfork stated that the release was "a far greater work than standard remix albums" and praised the duo for their ability to balance originality and playfulness: "At times they're looking for nuances in the original, small threads they can pick up and take somewhere else. Elsewhere they're just having fun, acting on instincts, never over-awed by the material." Sasha Frere-Jones listed the project as one of the "Best Albums of 2013" in his annual writeup in The New Yorker.

Darkside's debut album Psychic was released on October 4, 2013. The album was recorded over the course of two years between Jaar's home in New York City, Harrington's family barn in Upstate New York, and a space in Paris where they would stay between tours. The band announced the album's completion on August 20, 2013, with Jaar and Harrington inviting fans via Facebook and Twitter to listen to the album with them at a small venue on New York's Lower East Side. The band had to do two listening sessions to accommodate all of the people who showed up.

"Golden Arrow", the album's first song, was made available as a free download on August 23, 2013, via the band's website and Jaar's label Other People. The band originally billed the song as "the first 11 minutes of the DARKSIDE album" in posts, however, its title was revealed in a subsequent Pitchfork review, where the song was also named Best New Track. Spin also gave the track a positive review, describing the song as "11 minutes of instrumental excellence."

The album was met with glowing reviews, including a 9.0 rating and Best New Music designation from Pitchfork.

=== 2014–2020: Hiatus ===
On 17 August 2014, the group announced they were "coming to an end, for now" and would play their last show on September 12 at the Brooklyn Masonic Temple. The hiatus announcement was accompanied by the release of two new songs, "What They Say" and "Gone Too Soon," which were released together as a digital single and subsequently included on the Other People compilation Work.

=== 2020–2023: Spiral, the addition of Tlacael Esparza and Live at Spiral House ===
In late 2020, the band unexpectedly released a live album on Bandcamp, PSYCHIC LIVE JULY 17 2014, which documents one of their final pre-hiatus performances from Belgium's Dour Festival. Just under two months later, the band announced new album Spiral.

On December 21, 2020, Darkside released "Liberty Bell", the first single from their second studio album Spiral. The album was preceded by two more singles, "The Limit" and "Lawmaker", before being released on July 23, 2021, to generally favorable reviews. On January 18, 2022, the band released the non-album single "Ecdysis!", available for digital download only.

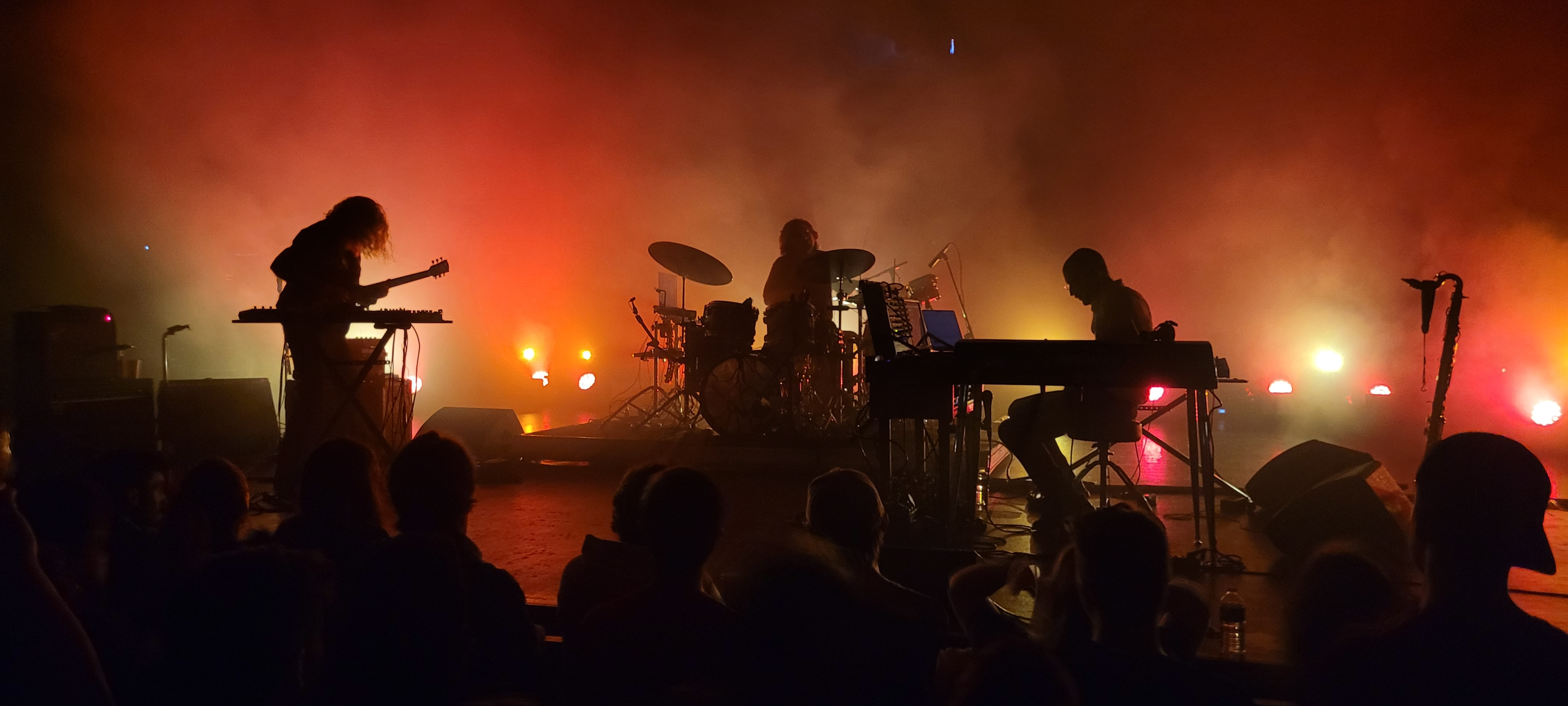
Darkside performing at Le Bikini, Toulouse, France on 11 June 2023. From left to right: Harrington, Tlacael Esparza and Jaar

For the album's accompanying tour, Jaar and Harrington invited drummer and percussionist Tlacael Esparza to join them: "We had to have deep conversations about the future of the band. The first step after those conversations was to speak to our old friend Tlac and see if he was interested in completely altering our DNA." Esparza had previously performed with the pair as a member of Jaar's touring ensemble in 2012, but had stepped away from live performances to develop his own drumming hardware interface, named Sensory Percussion, which "allows drummers to trigger an extremely wide variety of samples via their own kit." Esparza first played as part of the band on their European tour which began in May 2023.

On June 6, 2023, Darkside released Live at Spiral House, an album of material from their rehearsal place, Spiral House, in Los Angeles, featuring Esparza on drums for the first time.

=== 2023–present: Nothing ===
While touring in support of Spiral, the band began working on new material together as a three-piece: "On tour last year we had one day off too many. We opted to take advantage of all three of us being in the same place at the same time, so we set up camp in a studio in Paris and started making things again." Jaar elaborated, "“Playing music with Tlac, a whole world opened up. We spent the entire week in the studio, which was a dream because we got to make music all day long and experiment with weird techniques. We were there with [sound engineer] Pantxo Bertin, who’s a great friend of the band. The four of us together was very exciting and I can hear that excitement in the music we made. There’s something re-awakened in it, I hear."

On May 14, 2024, Darkside announced a UK and Europe Fall Tour of 12 dates starting on October 19 in Dublin, Ireland. Shortly before the beginning of the tour, the band started teasing new music, the website psychicspiralnothing.com, and its first North-American tour in 11 years. On October 21, they released the single "Graucha Max", along with the dates of the Psychic Spiral Nothing tour, a 15-show US and Canada run in the Spring of 2025.

On January 8, 2025, the band debuted the single "S.N.C", and revealed the cover art and release date of their third studio album, Nothing, out February 28 via Matador. The nine-track album is described on the group's Bandcamp page as "nine transmissions of negative space, telepathic seance, and spectral improvisation" which "[reflect] a search for form borne out of spontaneous elliptical jams, acoustic riffing, and digital levitations" and "[slip] through the cracks of convention with serpentine guitars, extraterrestrial static, and cavernous drums".

== Line-up ==
- Nicolás Jaar - various instruments, electronics, production (2011–2014; 2018–present)
- Dave Harrington - guitar, various instruments (2011–2014; 2018–present)
- Tlacael Esparza - drums, percussion (2022–present)

== Discography ==
=== Albums ===
Title	Album details	Peak chart positions			
Title	Album details	US	US Dance	US Heat	UK Indie
Psychic	Released: October 4, 2013; Label: Other People, Matador; Formats: CD, LP, digital download	163	6	5	21
Spiral	Released: July 23, 2021; Label: Matador; Formats: CD, LP, digital download, streaming	—	—	—	—
Nothing	Released: February 28, 2025; Label: Matador; Formats: CD, LP, digital download, streaming	—	—	—	—

=== Extended plays ===
Title	EP details
Darkside EP	Released: 17 November 2011; Label: Clown & Sunset; Format: Download, LP

=== Live albums ===
Title	EP details
PSYCHIC LIVE JULY 17 2014	Released: November 5, 2020; Label: Other People; Format: Digital download
Live at Spiral House	Released: June 9, 2023; Label: Matador; Format: Digital download

=== Singles ===
Title	Single details	Album
"Heart"	Released: November 18, 2013; Label: Other People, Matador; Formats: CDr	Psychic
"Paper Trails"	Released: March 13, 2014; Label: Other People, Matador; Format: CDr	Psychic
"What They Say" / "Gone Too Soon"	Released: August 17, 2014; Label: Other People; Format: Digital download / MP3	What They Say / Gone Too Soon
"Liberty Bell"	Released: December 21, 2020; Label: Matador; Format: Digital download / FLAC	Spiral
"Ecdysis!"	Released: January 18, 2022; Label: Matador; Format: Digital download	–
"Graucha Max"	Released: October 21, 2024; Label: Matador; Format: Digital download	Nothing

=== Remixes ===
- Daft Punk – "Random Access Memories Memories" (2013) (Remixed album as Daftside)
- St. Vincent – "Digital Witness" (2014)
