= 2017–2019 =

Studio album by Against All Logic
- Released: February 7, 2020
- Genre: Electronic
- Length: 45:29
- Label: Other People
- Producer: Nicolás Jaar

Nicolás Jaar chronology
2012–2017 (2018)	2017–2019 (2020)	Cenizas (2020)

2017–2019 is the second studio album released under the Against All Logic moniker by Chilean-American electronic music artist Nicolás Jaar. It was released on February 7, 2020, by Other People.

== Critical reception ==
Professional ratings
Aggregate scores
Source	Rating
Metacritic	84/100
Review scores
Source	Rating
AllMusic	4/5 stars
Clash	8/10
Exclaim!	8/10
The Line of Best Fit	8.5/10
Pitchfork	7.9/10

2017–2019 was met with widespread acclaim reviews from critics.

=== Accolades ===
Accolades for 2017–2019
Publication	Accolade	Rank	Ref.
Stereogum	Stereogum's 50 Best Albums of 2020 – Mid-Year	25	
Stereogum	The 50 Best Albums of 2020	33	
The Needle Drop	50 Best Albums of 2020	26	

== Track listing ==
All tracks written and produced by Nicolas Jaar.

No.	Title	Length
1.	"Fantasy"	5:12
2.	"If Loving You Is Wrong"	3:56
3.	"With an Addict"	7:05
4.	"If You Can't Do It Good, Do It Hard" (featuring Lydia Lunch)	3:58
5.	"Alarm"	1:52
6.	"Deeeeeeefers"	5:50
7.	"Faith"	7:00
8.	"Penny"	6:41
9.	"You (Forever)"	3:55

Vinyl track listing
No.	Title	Length
10.	"Vinyl-only edit"	6:21

Sample credits

- "Fantasy" contains samples from "Baby Boy", written by Beyoncé Knowles, Shawn Carter, Sean Paul Henriques, Scott Storch and Robert Waller, as performed by Beyoncé.
- "If Loving You Is Wrong" contains samples from "(If Loving You Is Wrong) I Don't Want to Be Right", written by Homer Banks, Carl Hampton and Raymond Jackson, and performed by Luther Ingram.

Tracks 1 and 3 were removed from streaming services due to uncleared samples. They were both supplanted by "You (Forever)" placed at track 1 and the remaining tracks as follows.
