= Cenizas =

2020 studio album by Nicolas Jaar

Studio album by Nicolás Jaar
- Released: March 27, 2020
- Length: 53:40
- Label: Other People

Nicolás Jaar chronology
2017–2019 (2020)	Cenizas (2020)	Telas (2020)

Singles from Cenizas
- 1. "Sunder" Released: March 11, 2020

Cenizas (transl. "Ashes") is a studio album by Chilean-American musician Nicolás Jaar. It was recorded at the same time as his previous album, 2017–2019. Cenizas was released on March 27, 2020, by Other People, and received widespread acclaim from critics.

== Background and composition ==
Jaar recorded Cenizas at the same time as his album 2017–2019, which was released under the moniker Against All Logic. That album featured a more energetic sound in comparison to Cenizas. He wrote and recorded both albums in an isolated setting. Jaar isolated himself as a means to escape negative feelings, but instead felt them building up. "Sunder" was released as a single on March 11, 2020, prior to the album’s release.

Cenizas is an electronic music album with elements of experimental jazz and ambient music. Jaar's vocals mostly eschew melody, instead being more mantra-like. PopMatters noted that Cenizas's more minimalist nature made it less accessible to the average listener.

The opening track, "Vanish", features iridescent horns, synthesizer sounds, and what Resident Advisor's Ryan Keeling believed to be a pipe organ. In a Exclaim! review, Daniel Sylvester compared the following track, "Menysid", to musique concrète. "Cenizas" features Jaar singing in Spanish; Beats Per Minute's Kyle Kohner felt its lyrics were a call for hope amongst a chaotic time. AllMusic's Paul Simpson described "Agosto" and "Rubble" as "dark electro-acoustic jazz"; both feature saxophones playing over "distant" keyboards. "Gocce", which means "drops" in Italian, features a dropping sound, along with a piano and harp. "Mud", the longest song on Cenizas, is a "droning blues mantra" with buzzing horns and "slow, lurching drums". Daniel Sylvester believed the track was inspired by Mark Hollis. Kohner described "Vaciar" as a "brooding but rather sleepy ambient composition". In "Sunder", Jaar reads multiple lines which end with the word "sunder", backed by ascending synthesizer sounds. "Hello Chain" contains vocal arrangements which Sylvester described as "cut-and-paste pastorals". "Garden" is composed of a bright piano repeating a phrase. Xerox features a piano and "monastic humming". On the final track, "Faith Made of Silk", Jaar sings "Look around/not ahead", which Megan Buerger noted was inspired by a quote from the anthropologist Anna Tsing. The song's backing features muted synthesizers and "jazzy" drums, which become more reminiscent of breakbeat near the end before the song abruptly stops. Simpson compared the abrupt ending to "being jolted awake from a vivid dream".

== Critical reception ==
Professional ratings
Aggregate scores
Source	Rating
Metacritic	82/100
Review scores
Source	Rating
AllMusic	3.5/5 stars
BPM	78%
Exclaim	9/10
The Line of Best Fit	9/10
Pitchfork	8.0/10

According to the review aggregator Metacritic, Cenizas received "universal acclaim" based on a weighted average score of 82 out of 100 from seven critic scores. In a review for AllMusic, Paul Simpson stated how Cenizas "is particularly challenging at first, but rewards as the listener becomes more accustomed to its unique properties and atmospheres". Kyle Kohner of Beats Per Minute deemed Cenizas to be "Jaar’s most compelling project yet" because of its "sonic allure and complete diversion into sounds rarely explored". Exclaim's Daniel Sylvester praised how Jaar melded "synthetic and textural sounds together so effortlessly" and thought that Cenizas "invites [listeners] into his alien, meditative, astonishing world". Liam Inscoe-Jones in The Line of Best Fit wrote that "Cenzias is a record expansive enough to open up even the smallest rooms". Resident Advisor's Ryan Keeling wrote: "We may currently turn to culture to reassure us or offer us simplifications of reality, and in these respects Cenizas provides more questions than answers. My personal feeling is that's exactly why it's equal to Jaar's best work". Megan Buerger of Pitchfork considered Cenizas as showing "Jaar at his most interrogating and existential, exploring grim atmospheres that feel both hallucinatory and troublingly real—a relatable image in a disorienting time".

== Track listing ==
Cenizas track listing
No.	Title	Length
1.	"Vanish"	3:11
2.	"Menysid"	3:58
3.	"Cenizas"	4:39
4.	"Agosto"	2:47
5.	"Gocce"	3:56
6.	"Mud"	7:13
7.	"Vacíar"	2:17
8.	"Sunder"	3:05
9.	"Hello, Chain"	5:26
10.	"Rubble"	3:01
11.	"Garden"	5:25
12.	"Xerox"	3:19
13.	"Faith Made of Silk"	5:23

== Charts ==
Chart performance for Cenizas
Chart (2020)	Peak position
Belgian Albums (Ultratop Flanders)	97
