= Pomegranates (album) =

Studio album by Nicolás Jaar
- Released: June 24, 2015
- Genre: Electronic, experimental
- Length: 75:15
- Label: Other People

Nicolás Jaar chronology
Space Is Only Noise (2011)	Pomegranates (2015)	Sirens (2016)

Pomegranates is a 2015 album by Chilean-American composer Nicolas Jaar, intended as an unofficial alternative soundtrack to the 1969 Soviet Armenian film The Color of Pomegranates.

== Production ==
Pomegranates was produced as an unofficial alternative soundtrack to the 1969 Soviet Armenian film The Color of Pomegranates, which was directed by Sergei Parajanov. Jaar first watched the film in 2015, at a friend's suggestion. By this time, he had already composed some of the songs that would later appear on the album. In a note accompanying the released album, Jaar wrote that he was "dumbfounded" by his first viewing of the film:

"I felt the aesthetic made complete sense with the strange themes I had been obsessed with over the past couple of years... I was curious to see what my songs sounded like when synced with the images, which turned into a 2-day bender where I soundtracked the entire film, creating a weird collage of the ambient music I had made over the last 2 years."

Jaar described the record as an "extremely personal" one, while also stating that, with Pomegranates, he had "failed at doing the kind of ambient record [he] really wanted to do."

== Track listing ==
No.	Title	Length
1.	"Garden of Eden"	5:40
2.	"Construction"	5:44
3.	"Pass the Time"	3:48
4.	"Survival"	5:20
5.	"The Fool and His Harem"	3:30
6.	"Nothingness"	1:57
7.	"Near Death"	3:19
8.	"Beasts of This Earth"	4:22
9.	"Fall Into Time"	2:24
10.	"Folie à deux"	3:18
11.	"Screams at the Edge of Dawn"	2:23
12.	"Divorce"	3:53
13.	"Three Windows"	5:11
14.	"Tourists"	4:06
15.	"Shame"	1:55
16.	"Tower of Sin"	1:32
17.	"Club Kapital"	4:56
18.	"Volver"	2:42
19.	"Spirit"	3:32
20.	"Muse"	5:43

== Reception ==
Professional ratings
Review scores
Source	Rating
Consequence of Sound	B
Pitchfork	7.6/10

Mark Richardson, writing for Pitchfork, wrote that "there are long stretches, particularly in the early going, where it's more of a sound piece than what is usually described as 'music', but the album's second half contains some of Jaar's loveliest tunes." Sasha Geffen, writing for Consequence of Sound, said that given its length, "Pomegranates doesn't always feel like an album or a soundtrack so much as it feels like an experiment in sculpting time."

A screening of The Color of Pomegranates featuring a live performance of Jaar's alternative soundtrack was originally advertised for 22 February 2017, at the Cinefamily in Los Angeles, California. However, this performance was replaced with the film's original soundtrack, due to objections from the Parajanov-Vartanov Institute and The Film Foundation that the live performance would not present the film as Parajanov intended it.
