= Sirens (Nicolás Jaar album) =

Studio album by Nicolás Jaar
- Released: September 30, 2016
- Genre: Electronic; ambient; experimental
- Length: 41:47
- Label: Other People
- Producer: Nicolas Jaar

Nicolás Jaar chronology
Pomegranates (2015)	Sirens (2016)	2012–2017 (2018)

Alternative cover
- Deluxe edition album cover

Sirens is the second studio album by composer and electronic music artist Nicolás Jaar, released on September 30, 2016 by Other People. Influenced by Chilean history and politics, as well as his own personal life, Sirens has received acclaim from both independent music and electronic music publications.

On December 8, 2017, Sirens Deluxe was issued, featuring three bonus songs woven into the album. Jaar said of this version: "this deluxe version of the record is what it should have been all along but i got scared of "coin [In Nine Hands]" and decided against it at the last minute.. but then i started performing coin at every show... i couldn't get it out of me..everything floats to the surface at some point.."

== Reception ==
Professional ratings
Aggregate scores
Source	Rating
AnyDecentMusic?	7.6/10
Metacritic	79/100
Review scores
Source	Rating
AllMusic	3/5 stars
Consequence of Sound	B
Exclaim!	8/10
The Guardian	3/5 stars
Mixmag	9/10
Pitchfork	8.7/10
PopMatters	9/10
Q	3/5 stars
Resident Advisor	4.5/5
XLR8R	9/10

At Metacritic, which assigns a normalised rating out of 100 to reviews from mainstream critics, Sirens received an average score of 79, based on 15 reviews, indicating "generally favorable reviews". Jonah Bromwich, writing for Pitchfork, gave Sirens a positive review, stating, "Sirens is a thoughtful study in contrasts, both musical and political. It's only Nicolas Jaar's second LP, but it is the mark of an enduring electronic composer"; he gave the album a "Best New Music" designation. Nina Corcoran, writing for Consequence of Sound, said, "Though it seems fleeting, Jaar’s hypnotizing songs cradle you until you reach a point of illumination, a bubble of sound that feels limitless in its elongated, looped second, a dance to softened fragments."

Rolling Stone named it the #1 Electronic Album of 2016.

=== Accolades ===
Publication	Accolade	Year	Rank	Ref.
Rolling Stone	The 20 Best Electronic Albums of 2016	2016	1	
Consequence of Sound	Top 50 Albums of 2016	2016	29	
Pitchfork	The 20 Best Electronic Albums of 2016	2016	—N/a	
Pitchfork	The 50 Best Albums of 2016	2016	20	
Rough Trade	Albums of the Year	2016	44	
The Skinny	Top 50 Albums of 2016	2016	27	

== Track listing ==
=== CD and digital ===
All tracks are written by Nicolas Jaar.

Original pressing
No.	Title	Length
1.	"Killing Time"	11:14
2.	"The Governor"	6:50
3.	"Leaves"	3:30
4.	"No"	6:34
5.	"Three Sides of Nazareth"	9:55
6.	"History Lesson"	3:44
Total length:		41:47

Some digital editions include "Wildflowers" as a 5:34-long, unsegued bonus track, whereas the pressings listed below include segues in and out of that song.

Japanese CD pressing
No.	Title	Writer(s)	Length
1.	"Killing Time"		11:14
2.	"Wildflowers"	Nicolas Jaar; Sasha Spielberg; Alex Ashe	5:28
3.	"The Governor"		6:50
4.	"Leaves"		3:30
5.	"No"		6:34
6.	"Three Sides of Nazareth"		9:55
7.	"History Lesson"		3:44
Total length:			47:21

=== Vinyl ===
Original pressing

Side A
No.	Title	Writer(s)	Length
1.	"Mirrors"		3:18
2.	"Killing Time"		6:48
3.	"Sirens"		1:16
4.	"Wildflowers"	Nicolas Jaar; Sasha Spielberg; Alex Ashe	5:28
5.	"The Governor"		6:50
Total length:			23:38

Side B
No.	Title	Length
1.	"Leaves"	3:30
2.	"No"	6:34
3.	"Three Sides of Nazareth"	9:55
4.	"History Lesson"	3:44
Total length:		23:43

"Mirrors", "Killing Time" and "Sirens", together, are the same as "Killing Time" on the standard CD pressing.

=== Sirens Deluxe ===
No.	Title	Writer(s)	Length
1.	"Killing Time"		11:14
2.	"Wildflowers"	Nicolas Jaar; Sasha Spielberg; Alex Ashe	5:28
3.	"The Governor"		6:50
4.	"A Coin in Nine Hands"		8:03
5.	"Leaves"		3:30
6.	"No"		6:34
7.	"Three Sides of Nazareth"		9:55
8.	"History Lesson"		3:44
9.	"America/I'm for the Birds" (listed as "America! I'm for the Birds" on digital copies)		4:06
Total length:			59:29

== Charts ==
Chart (2016)	Peak position
Belgian Albums (Ultratop Flanders)	19
Belgian Albums (Ultratop Wallonia)	118
Dutch Albums (Album Top 100)	78
German Albums (Offizielle Top 100)	66
New Zealand Heatseeker Albums (RMNZ)	6
Swiss Albums (Schweizer Hitparade)	92
