= Nicolas Jaar =

American composer (born 1990)

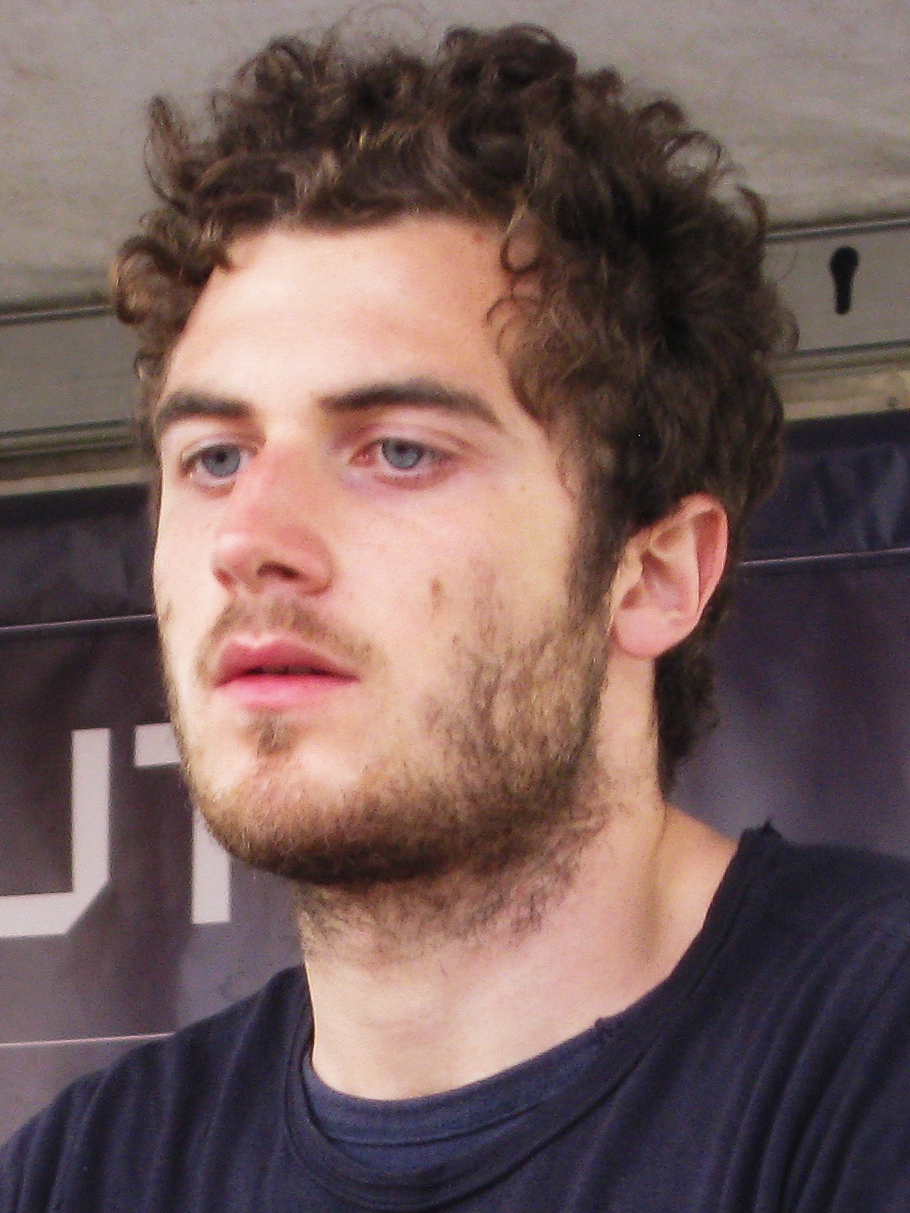
- Jaar in 2012

Background information
- Also known as: Against All Logic; A.A.L.; Nico
- Born: Nicolás Jaar; 10 January 1990 (age 36); New York City, U.S.
- Genres: Electronic; experimental; ambient; house
- Occupations: Musician; composer; record producer
- Years active: 2007–present
- Labels: Circus Company; Other People
- Member of: Darkside
- Website: nicolasjaar.net

Nicolas Jaar ( Arabic: جعار، English: /dʒɑːr/, Spanish: [ˈɟʝaɾ]; né Nicolás Jaar; born 10 January 1990) is a Chilean- Palestinian- American composer and musician. Among his notable works are the albums Space Is Only Noise (2011), Sirens (2016), and Cenizas (2020). He has also released three albums as one half of his band Darkside (Psychic, 2013, Spiral, 2021 and Nothing, 2025) and two further albums under the alias Against All Logic.

After folding his record label Clown & Sunset in 2013, Jaar founded Other People and has since released many experimental recordings through the imprint, including works by Lydia Lunch, Pierre Bastien, John Wall and Lucrecia Dalt. He scored Jacques Audiard's Dheepan (2015 Palme d'Or winner) and Pablo Larrain's 2019 film Ema.

== Early life ==
Jaar was born in New York to Chilean parents Evelyne Meynard, a dancer, and Alfredo Jaar, an artist and architect. His mother is of French origin, while his father has Dutch and Palestinian ancestry; the surname Jaar is reported to originate from the Palestinian city of Bethlehem. After his parents' separation, Jaar moved with his mother to Santiago at the age of three, where he lived until moving back to New York at the age of nine when his parents reconciled. Jaar attended the Lycée Français de New York.

Jaar matriculated at Brown University in 2008; he graduated from Brown in 2012 with a degree in comparative literature.

== Career ==
=== 2007–2011: Beginnings and debut album ===
In 2007, Jaar met Gadi Mizrahi and Zev Eisenberg who ran the legendary "Marcy" parties in Brooklyn, New York. After hearing his early works, Mizrahi suggested 17 year-old Jaar put a 4/4 kick drum underneath his largely experimental compositions. This was Jaar's first foray into dance music, documented in his first release on Mizrahi's label Wolf + Lamb, entitled The Student. Mizrahi said of Jaar:

Back then everything D.J.'s were playing was 128 beats per minute. The stuff he was doing was almost half that speed.

Jaar spent the next four years in the NY underground dance scene creating rough, hip hop influenced house music, releasing such singles as "Love You Gotta Lose Again" and "Don't Believe the Hype". During this time, Jaar made two songs featuring his vocals in Spanish, "Mi Mujer" and "El Bandido", which he did not originally intend to release as they were made as jokes to make his mother laugh and dance. However, he later chose to release them in 2010 in response to noticing a trend of non-Latin DJs sampling Latin American music without compensation.

He released his debut album, Space Is Only Noise, in January 2011 to critical acclaim and four stars from The Guardian. It was ranked number one album of the year by Resident Advisor, Mixmag, and Crack Mag. Jaar toured the album with his future bandmate Dave Harrington (later of Darkside) and Will Epstein, and was later voted number one Live Act on Resident Advisor for the three years he toured the record.

=== 2012–2017: Darkside and Sirens ===
In 2012, Jaar debuted a live concept called From Scratch, where, in front of a live audience, he sampled records he had bought that day. The first iteration happened in Queens, New York at MOMA PS1; it was a five-hour concert with collaboration from Will Epstein, videographer Ryan Staake, dancer Lizzie Feidelson and singer Sasha Spielberg. He has also performed From Scratch in Boulder, Colorado, and Montréal, Quebec.

On 18 May 2012, Jaar made his BBC Radio 1 Essential Mix debut, which was voted Radio 1's Essential Mix Of The Year of 2012.

On 4 October 2013, Psychic, the debut album from Darkside, Jaar's project with longtime collaborator Dave Harrington, was released to critical acclaim and a 9.0 score on Pitchfork. The band toured the record for the entirety of 2014.

In February 2015, Jaar released an ambient and noise record entitled Pomegranates, which was described as sounding "like broken Middle Eastern instruments half-playing a modal melody amid bursts of hiss". Later that year, Jaar scored the soundtrack to Dheepan, a thriller by French filmmaker Jacques Audiard about a family of Sri Lankan refugees living in the suburbs of Paris. It was the winner of the Palme d'Or at Cannes 2015.

His second studio album, Sirens, was released in September 2016. Rolling Stone named it the number one Electronic Album of the year. A deluxe version was released in December 2017, containing three new tracks interspersed throughout the album.

=== 2018–present: Against All Logic, return of Darkside ===
On 17 February 2018, Jaar released his first album under his new alias Against All Logic, titled 2012–2017. The album, released with little warning and no direct references to Jaar's name, received critical acclaim upon its release, including a score of 8.8 and "Best New Music" designation from Pitchfork.

Jaar co-produced most of FKA Twigs's second studio album, Magdalene, released in October 2019.

In 2019, Jaar created the soundtrack to the Chilean film Ema.

In 2020, Jaar released three albums; 2017–2019 in February (as Against All Logic), Cenizas in March, and Telas in July.

Nearly eight years after the release of their debut album, Darkside released their second studio album, Spiral, on 23 July 2021 via Matador Records. It received generally favorable reviews. In November 2023, Jaar signed an open letter calling for a ceasefire and an end to Israel's blockade of the Gaza Strip. In July 2024, Jaar was one of the performers for the Artists for Aid Benefit Concert in London which raised funds for the Gaza Strip and Sudan. In 2025 the 3rd Darkside album Nothing was released.

Jaar officially released Piedras 1 and Piedras 2 on 25 October 2024. These albums are composed of tracks from his 17-episode radio play Archivos de Radio Piedras.

== Imprints ==
=== Clown & Sunset ===
Clown & Sunset
- Founded: 2009
- Founder: Nicolas Jaar
- Defunct: 2013
- Genre: Electronic, downtempo
- Country of origin: United States
- Location: New York City
- Official website: www.csa.fm/clownandsunset

Clown & Sunset was an independent record label founded by Jaar in 2009. It was part of Clown & Sunset Aesthetics, an interdisciplinary production house founded by Jaar and film producer Noah Kraft. The label was shut down in August 2013 after which Jaar founded his imprint Other People.

Nikita Quasim, Soul Keita and Nicolas Jaar met in the summer of 2004 while traveling with their respective schools on a field trip to the Sonora desert. Although they were uninterested in each other at first, they quickly bonded over their mutual interest in music. In January 2009, on his nineteenth birthday, Jaar decided to formalize his endeavors with Quasim and Keita by founding Clown & Sunset. He created the label in order to share music that he felt was too personal to release through any other label.

Clown & Sunset's first two records were a series of EPs entitled Sunset of a Clown, released in February and October, 2009 respectively. Each EP contained a song from one of the three founding artists. Clown & Sunset's next EP, Russian Dolls, featured the song “Russian Dolls” by Jaar, and a remix from Detroit DJ and producer Ryan Crosson. In December 2010, Clown & Sunset released Inés, a ten-track compilation. The LP was well received by fans and critics, receiving 7.7 out of 10 rating from Pitchfork. Following Inés, Clown & Sunset began to expand its original roster. As Nikita and Soul searched for musicians to incorporate into the label, Jaar continued the momentum of 2010 releasing his debut album Space is Only Noise to critical acclaim, receiving "Best New Music" from Pitchfork. In June 2011, Valentin Stip, a French, classically trained pianist and electronic musician became the first new artist to debut on Clown & Sunset, releasing an EP, Anytime Will Do, in June, 2011.

In February 2012 Jaar and Kraft premiered Clown & Sunset Aesthetics in New York City with a sold-out Clown & Sunset showcase at the Music Hall of Williamsburg and a 5-hour improvised live exhibit at MoMA PS1.

Artists who have released music on Clown & Sunset include:

- Nicolas Jaar
- DARKSIDE
- Soul Keita
- Nikita Quasim
- Valentin Stip
- Acid Pauli

=== Other People ===
Jaar founded New York-based imprint Other People. It has published music from artists such as Lydia Lunch, John Wall, Pierre Bastien, Tomaga, DJ Slugo, William Basinski, VTGNIKE, Nikita Quasim, 12z, Sary Moussa and the Terepa collective, which consists of such artists as Kouhei Matsunaga, Laurel Halo, Lucrecia Dalt, Charlotte Collin, and Julia Holter. Other People has also featured the visual & audio work of artists Africanus Okokon and Maziyar Pahlevan.

In 2016, Other People launched THE NETWORK, a web of 111 fictional radio stations done in collaboration with visual artists Jena Myung and Maziyar Pahlevan. In 2017, THE NETWORK became a book, published by PRINTED MATTER in NY.

== Discography ==
- Space Is Only Noise (2011)
- Pomegranates (2015)
- Nymphs (2016)
- Sirens (2016)
- Cenizas (2020)
- Telas (2020)
- Intiha (with Ali Sethi) (2023)
- Piedras 1 (2024)
- Piedras 2 (2024)

=== Against All Logic ===
- 2012–2017 (2018)
- 2017–2019 (2020)

== Awards and nominations ==
Award	Year	Nominee(s)	Category	Result	Ref.
BBC Radio 1	2012	Nicolas Jaar (2012-05-19)	Essential Mix of the Year	Won	
International Dance Music Awards	2016	"Don't Break My Love"	Best Chillout/Lounge Track	Nominated	
