= Telas =

2020 studio album by Nicolas Jaar

Studio album by Nicolás Jaar
- Released: July 17, 2020
- Length: 58:41
- Label: Other People
- Producer: Nicolás Jaar

Nicolás Jaar chronology
Cenizas (2020)	Telas (2020)	Intiha (2023)

Telas (transl. Canvases) is the fourth studio album by American musician Nicolás Jaar. It was released on July 17, 2020, by Other People.

== Critical reception ==
Professional ratings
Aggregate scores
Source	Rating
Metacritic	74/100
Review scores
Source	Rating
BPM	77%
Exclaim!	9/10
NME	3/5 stars
Pitchfork	7.5/10

In a review for Pitchfork, Daniel Felsenthal said, "Telas is a taut, exhaustively balanced work, although its four long songs add up to an hour of music. In the context of Jaar’s busy year, it signifies a continued blurring of his various roles—DJ, ambient craftsman, distinctive vocalist with an electronic toolkit—and the album’s deliberate structure and ominous mood indicate that Jaar can make direct, even political statements without sung lyrics or speech samples." John Amen of Exclaim! said "Telas brings to mind nascent stars and galaxies, protean adaptations, and ever-expanding space. The album's complex design and diverse instrumentation are consistently sublime, the venture no less than a musical inquiry into the attributes of being itself."

== Track listing ==
All tracks are written by Nicolas Jaar.

No.	Title	Length
1.	"Telahora"	16:16
2.	"Telencima"	15:09
3.	"Telahumo"	14:20
4.	"Telallás"	12:56
Total length:		58:41

== Album art ==
The album art was created by Somnath Bhatt and the website was built by Abeera Kamran.
