= Mike James Kirkland =

American R&B singer (born 1949)

Mike James Kirkland (born 1949 in Yazoo City, Mississippi) is an American R&B singer. He began his recording career in 1965, as leader of Mike & The Censations, a quartet which included his brother Robert, their sister and her husband. He was also half of the duo Bo and Ruth on Claridge Records who achieved a U.K. Top 20 single with their release of "You're Gonna Get Next To Me" (credited to Bo Kirkland and Ruth Davis) in the summer of 1977.

== Biography ==
Mike James Kirkland grew up singing gospel and doo wop in Mississippi in a local gospel act, The Seven Seals, with his two brothers, Walter and Robert. He began his recording career as leader of the group Mike & The Censations in 1965. After the Censations folded, Kirkland and his brother Robert moved to California where they started a record label, Bryan Records, so they could release love songs and soul music that Kirkland was working on. They released two albums, "Hang on in There" (1972) and "Doin' it Right" (1973), following the style and social comment of artists like Marvin Gaye and Curtis Mayfield. In 1975, Kirland began issuing solo recordings under the name Bo Kirkand. Also as Bo, he recorded an album as a part of duo with Ruth Davis.

The reputation of the albums "Hang on in There" and "Doin' it Right" slowly grew and spread over the following years, culminating with reissues in the '90s by Luv N Haight.

In 2010, John Legend & The Roots released an album that includes a cover of one of Kirkland's songs, "Hang On In There."

== Discography ==
Albums:

- Hang on in There 1972, reissued 1999
- Doin' it Right 1973, reissued 1999

Singles:

- "Victim of Circumstance", Mike & the Censations 1965 - Top 50 R&B
- "There is Nothing I Can Do About It", Mike & the Censations - Top 50 R&B
- "Together" / "The Prophet", Mike James Kirkland 1971
