= Melodic Records =

UK independent record label

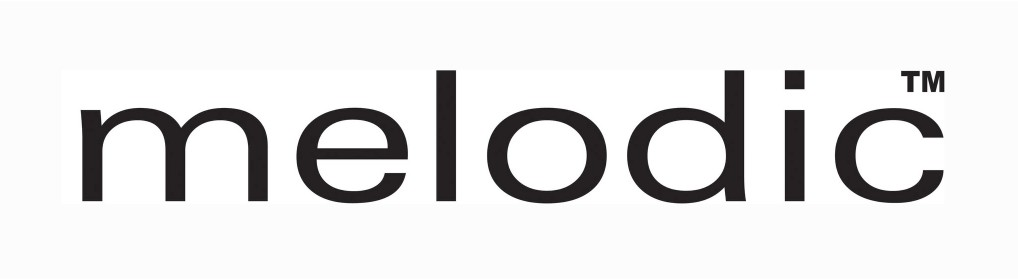
- Founded: 1999
- Genre: Alternative, Electronic, Indie
- Country of origin: United Kingdom
- Location: Manchester
- Official website: melodic.co.uk

Melodic Records is a British independent record label founded by David Cooper in 1999. Based in Manchester, England, the label have recently released their 132nd release as of October 2021 (Strawbery Guy's 'Sun Outside My Window' album) and celebrated its 20th anniversary in 2019. The label also run a label management arm, Melodic European Labels, which distributes and promotes overseas labels in Europe.

== History ==
Working For a Nuclear Free City signed to Melodic Records in 2006, and released their self-titled debut album the same year, the first of four albums they would put out on Melodic. Spanning 10 years, their entire career was spent with Melodic, with the band gaining attention throughout, particularly for 2007 single 'Rocket'.

Nottingham Kraut-Rock / Psych-Pop band The Soundcarriers were signed to the label in 2009, and released their first two albums on Melodic. In the following years, releases included more L. Pierre content, as well as new acts Dark Dark Dark and K-X-P, the former of which was to find critical and commercial success with their albums Wild Go and Who Needs Who, as well as with a 2014 soundtrack album for the film Flood Tide.

Stephen Steinbrink has been the flagship artist for the label, releasing all three of his albums through Melodic, and his brand of well-crafted indie-folk has seen him earn critical acclaim from the likes of Pitchfork and Loud and Quiet. His debut 'Arranged Waves' was released in 2014, followed by 'Anagrams' in 2016 and last year's 'Utopia Teased'. During that period, there was also time for albums from US garage acts Cool Ghouls and Bonny Doon, two albums for London's The Drink, as well as the final L. Pierre album, '1948-'. Released only on vinyl with no sleeve, '1948-' was a concept album based around the first ever vinyl record, which is heavily sampled throughout the LP.

From 2019, Melodic took a heavier focus on local artists, signing West Yorkshire trio Working Men's Club, Working Men's Club's debut single Bad Blood sold out of its initial pressing on pre-order, and spent a month and a half on the BBC 6 Music playlist. W. H. Lung's debut album Incidental Music, was released on 5 April 2019, selling out both its limited clear vinyl and its DINKED edition. Coming out to critical acclaim, the album received glowing reviews from Loud and Quiet, Q Magazine, Mojo, Uncut and The Guardian. The record was named #1 Album of the year by UK record shops Piccadilly Records and Resident. This was followed by the signings of two new UK acts, Strawberry Guy and The Cool Greenhouse. Strawberry Guy's debut EP Taking My Time To Be was released in October 2019, and has since gone on to reach over 150 million streams to date across all platforms.

Melodic began 2021 with the release of Cool Ghouls' At Georges Zoo, then in the summer announced both the debut album of Strawberry Guy and the return of W. H. Lung. Vanities, the second album from W. H. Lung was released on 8 October to acclaim from outlets including Stereogum, The Times and Paste. Strawberry Guy's much anticipated debut full-length Sun Outside My Window was released on 31 October, to coverage from NME, Line Of Best Fit and more. In December 2021 W. H. Lung embarked on a UK wide tour in support of the album, and both Strawberry Guy and W. H. Lung were due to travel to the US for SXSW 2022.
