= Gigantic Music =

Gigantic Music is an American independent record label, founded by Brian Devine in 2000. Gigantic Music is based out of New York City.

Gigantic Music signed New York's well-established act the Walkmen for the band's fourth album, You & Me. Other acts include Gringo Star, Shy Child, and Your Youth.

== Signed artists ==
=== Current ===
- Birds Of Avalon
- Shy Child
- Your Youth

=== Former ===
- ARMS (band)
- Aa (Big A Little a)
- Asobi Seksu
- The Boggs
- The Builders and the Butchers
- Chubby
- The Cloud Room
- Dragons of Zynth
- Frances (band)
- Gringo Star
- Harlem Shakes
- Human Television
- The Hundred in the Hands
- Kevin Ayers
- Ladell McLin
- Low Frequency in Stereo
- The Rumble Strips
- Shelby
- Seedy Gonzalez
- Some Action
- The Walkmen
