= Space Is Only Noise =

Studio album by Nicolás Jaar
- Released: January 28, 2011
- Genre: Electronic; experimental
- Length: 46:25
- Label: Circus Company
- Producer: Nicolas Jaar

Nicolás Jaar chronology
Space Is Only Noise (2011)	Pomegranates (2015)

Space Is Only Noise is the debut studio album by Chilean-American musician Nicolás Jaar, released on 28 January 2011 by Circus Company.

In 2012 it was awarded a silver certification from the Independent Music Companies Association which indicated sales of at least 20,000 copies throughout Europe.

== Critical reception ==
Professional ratings
Aggregate scores
Source	Rating
AnyDecentMusic?	7.9/10
Metacritic	86/100
Review scores
Source	Rating
AllMusic	4/5 stars
Clash	9/10
The Guardian	4/5 stars
The Irish Times	4/5 stars
Mojo	4/5 stars
Pitchfork	8.4/10
PopMatters	9/10
Q	4/5 stars
Resident Advisor	4.5/5
Uncut	4/5 stars

At Metacritic, which assigns a normalised rating out of 100 to reviews from mainstream critics, Space Is Only Noise received an average score of 86, based on 15 reviews, indicating "universal acclaim". Resident Advisor named it album of the year and Pitchfork placed the album at number 20 on its list of the "Top 50 albums of 2011". Pitchfork also placed the song "Space Is Only Noise If You Can See" at number 44 on its list "The Top 100 Tracks of 2011". In 2019, Pitchfork ranked the album at number 148 on their list of "The 200 Best Albums of the 2010s".

=== Accolades ===
Publications' year-end list appearances for Space Is Only Noise
Critic/Publication	List	Rank	Ref
BrooklynVegan	BrooklynVegan's Top 141 Albums of the 2010s	52	
Cokemachineglow	Cokemachineglow's Top 50 Albums of 2011	40	
Crack Magazine	Crack Magazine's Top 100 Albums of the 2010s	62	
Drowned in Sound	Drowned in Sound's Top 75 Albums of 2011	50	
Gorilla vs. Bear	Gorilla vs. Bear's Top 30 Albums of 2011	30	
MusicOMH	MusicOMH's Top 50 Albums of 2011	38	
The Needle Drop	The Needle Drop's Top 50 Albums of 2011	9	
No Ripcord	No Ripcord's Top 50 Albums of 2011	21	
Pitchfork	Pitchfork's Top 50 Albums of 2011	20	
Pitchfork	Pitchfork's Top 200 Albums of the 2010s	148	
Pretty Much Amazing	Pretty Much Amazing's Top 40 Albums of 2011	36	
Resident Advisor	Resident Advisor's Top 20 Albums of 2011	1	
Stereogum	Stereogum's Top 50 Albums of 2011	39	

== Track listing ==
Space Is Only Noise
No.	Title	Length
1.	"Être"	4:49
2.	"Colomb"	3:22
3.	"Sunflower"	0:48
4.	"Too Many Kids Finding Rain in the Dust"	3:28
5.	"Keep Me There"	5:21
6.	"I Got A" (removed from later editions)	4:08
7.	"Problem with the Sun"	3:52
8.	"Space Is Only Noise If You Can See"	5:42
9.	"Almost Fell"	2:32
10.	"Balance Her in Between Your Eyes"	3:45
11.	"Specters of the Future"	1:58
12.	"Trace"	0:23
13.	"Variations"	3:21
14.	"Être"	2:56
Total length:		46:25

The original track listing features "I Got A" as track 6, but this track was later removed from the album due to an uncleared sample. Subsequently, the original 14-track version of the album was pulled from stores and replaced with a 13 track version, the same one which can be found on streaming services.

== Charts ==
Chart performance for Space Is Only Noise
Chart (2011)	Peak position
Belgian Albums (Ultratop Flanders)	49
