= Chris Zane =

American record producer

- Occupations: Producer, engineer, mixer
- Years active: 1999–present
- Website: www.chris-zane.com

Chris Zane is an American music producer, engineer and mixer based in London. He has worked with an array of artists such as Jack Antonoff, Passion Pit, St. Lucia, Holy Ghost!, and Friendly Fires.

== Discography ==
- Chloe Howl - "Magnetic" (s/r)
- RIVRS - "The Berlin Mixtape" (Atlantic Records)
- Shy Luv - "Time" (Black Butter Records/Sony Music)
- Strong Asian Mothers - Animal EP (s/r )
- Sarah Close - "Caught Up" (Kodiak Club/Parlophone)
- VHS Collection - "Wide Awake" (s/r)
- Bat for Lashes - "Sunday Love (radio version)" (Parlophone)
- St. Lucia - "Matter" (Columbia Records)
- VITAMIN - "This Isn't Love" (SONY)
- Sizzy Rocket - "Thrills" (Yebo Music)
- JMR - "To Be Alone With You" (Republic Records)
- WILLS - "WILLS" (IAMSOUND Records)
- Temptress - "Guilty Pleasure" (Machine Records)
- Passion Pit - "Kindred" (Columbia Records)
- FRANKIE - "Dreamstate" EP (RCA Records)
- Penguin Prison - "Lost In New York" (Downtown Records)
- Jack & Eliza - "Gentle Warnings" (Yebo)
- Alex Winston - "Careless" (Atlantic Records)
- Miniature Tigers - "Cruel Runnings" (Yebo Music)
- Natas Loves You - "The Eight Continent" (3ème Bureau)
- Jinja Safari - "Jinja Safari" (Universal Records)
- Chloe Howl - "Rumour" (Columbia Records)
- St. Lucia - "When the Night" (Columbia Records)
- Pacific Air - "Long Live KOKO EP" (Universal Republic)
- Holy Ghost! - "It Gets Dark" (DFA)
- Passion Pit - "Gossamer" (Columbia Records)
- Nelly Furtado - "The Spirit Indestructible" (Interscope Records)
- Ruby Frost - "Volition" (Universal)
- Stepdad - "Wildlife Pop" (Black Bell Records/Warner Bros. Records)
- Devin - "Romancing" (Frenchkiss Records)
- Geographer - "Myth" '(Modern Art Records/Warner Bros. Records)
- Devin Therriault - Romancing (No Evil)
- Heartsrevolution - "Ride or Die" (Kitsune)
- Friendly Fires - "Pala" (XL)
- Holy Ghost! - "Holy Ghost!" (DFA)
- Asobi Seksu - "Fluorescence" (Polyvinyl)
- Chapel Club - "Surfacing" (Polydor)
- Ruby Frost - "Goodnight" (Universal)
- The Hundred in the Hands - "This City", "Dressed in Dresden" (Warp)
- Les Savy Fav - "Root for Ruin" (Frenchkiss/Wichita Recordings)
- The Walkmen - "Lisbon" (Fat Possum)
- Suckers - "Wild Smile" (Frenchkiss Records)
- Holy Ghost! - "Static on the Wire" (DFA)
- Passion Pit - Manners (Bonus) (Columbia Records)
- The Hundred in the Hands - "This Desert" (Warp)
- Shy Child - "Liquid Love" (Wall of Sound)
- Mumford and Sons - "Little Lion Man EP" (Universal)
- Passion Pit - Manners (Frenchkiss Records/Columbia Records)
- Harlem Shakes - "Technicolor Health" (Gigantic Music)
- The Rakes - "Klang" (V2 Records/Universal Records)
- Asobi Seksu - "Hush" (Polyvinyl)
- Frances - "All the While" (Gigantic Music)
- The Walkmen - "You & Me" (Gigantic Music)
- Tokyo Police Club - "Elephant Shell" (Saddle Creek)
- Bridges and Powerlines - "Ghost Types" (Citybird Records)
- Les Savy Fav - "Let's Stay Friends" (Frenchkiss Records/Wichita Recordings)
- White Rabbits - "Fort Nightly" (Say Hey Records)
- Asobi Seksu - "Strawberries" single (One Little Indian)
- Shy Child - "Noise Won't Stop" (Kill Rock Stars/PIAS)
- Les Savy Fav - "What Would Wolves Do?" single (Universal Records/Wichita Recordings)
- Asobi Seksu - "Stay Awake" single (Gigantic Music)
- The Boggs - "Forts" (Gigantic Music)
- Tokyo Police Club - "Your English Is Good" single (Memphis Industries)
- Harlem Shakes - "Burning Birthdays" (self-released)
- Les Savy Fav - "Accidental Deaths" single (Rococo/Popfrenzy)
- Ambulance LTD - "New English" EP (TVT Records)
- Thunderbirds Are Now! - "Make History" (Frenchkiss Records)
- Human Television - "Look At Who You're Talking To" (Gigantic Music)
- Asobi Seksu - "Citrus" (Friendly Fire Recordings/One Little Indian)
- Les Savy Fav - "Plagues & Snakes" single (Frenchkiss Records)
- Shy Child - "Noise Won't Stop" single (WEA/Warner Bros. Records)
- Calla - "It Dawned On Me" single (Beggars Banquet Records)
- Tangiers - "The Family Myth" (Frenchkiss Records)
- Lee Ranaldo - "Drift" (Plexifilm)
- Calla - "Collisions (Beggars Banquet Records)
- The Cloud Room - "The Cloud Room" (Gigantic Music)
- Calla - "Strangler" (Rykodisc)
- INOUK - "Search for the Bees" EP (Say Hey Records)
- Shy Child - "One With the Sun" (Say Hey Records)
- INOUK - "No Danger" (Astralwerks/Say Hey Records)
- Ambulance LTD - "LP" (TVT Records)
- Les Savy Fav - "Inches" (Frenchkiss Records)
- Human Television - "Human Television" (Gigantic Music)
- Les Savy Fav - "Hold Onto Your Genre" (Rococo/Popfrenzy)
- Mendoza Line - "Fortune" (Cooking Vinyl)
- Les Savy Fav - "Fading Vibes" (Rococo/Popfrenzy)
- Human Television - "All Songs Written By" (Gigantic Music)
- Calla - "Televise" (Arena Rock Recordings)
- Mink Lungs - "I'll Take It" (Arena Rock Recordings)
- Ambulance LTD - "Ambulance LTD" EP (TVT Records)
- The Boggs - "We Are The Boggs We Are" (Arena Rock Recordings)
- LUNA - "Fairy Pop" Album (Universal Music Group)
