= Humanity (EP) =

Humanity EP

EP by Shy Child
- Released: 2003
- Genre: Synthpop; Electronica
- Label: Grenadine Records

Shy Child chronology
Please Consider Our Time (2002)	Humanity EP (2003)	One with the Sun (2004)

'Humanity EP' is an EP by New York City synthpop duo Shy Child. It was released in 2003 on Grenadine Records.

It was a step in a new direction for the band, who had previously produced progressive electronica. This EP is much more synthpop influenced.

Exclaim! described it as "tough feel-good shit."

== Track listing ==
1. 'You're All Aglow'
2. 'Dawn To Dust'
3. 'Anywhere'
4. 'Sting Ray Wings'
