= Acoustic at Olympic Studios =

Acoustic at Olympic Studios / Rewolf

Studio album by Asobi Seksu
- Released: February 8, 2009
- Recorded: Olympic Studios, November 2008
- Genre: Indie rock, shoegaze, dream pop
- Length: 34:39
- Label: One Little Indian, Polyvinyl Record Co.
- Producer: Paul PDub Walton

Asobi Seksu chronology
Hush (2009)	Acoustic at Olympic Studios / Rewolf (2009)	Fluorescence (2011)

Alternative cover
- Rewolf album cover

Professional ratings
Review scores
Source	Rating
AllMusic	2/5 stars
Pitchfork	(6.4/10)
PopMatters	(7/10)

Acoustic at Olympic Studios is an acoustic album by American shoegaze band Asobi Seksu, recorded at Olympic Studios in Barnes, London. The album was first released in February 2009 by One Little Indian Records as a tour-exclusive CD, then reissued and retitled Rewolf by their US label, Polyvinyl Record Co., in November 2009. It contains mostly acoustic versions of songs from Citrus and Hush, as well as a few unique tracks.

== Track listing ==
All songs written by Asobi Seksu, except where noted:

1. "Breathe into Glass" – 3:12
2. "Walk on the Moon" – 3:56
3. "Meh No Mae" – 3:29
4. "New Years" – 3:11
5. "Blind Little Rain" – 2:40
6. "Urusai Tori" – 2:56
7. "Suzanne" (Hope Sandoval) – 3:35
8. "Gliss" – 4:05
9. "Familiar Light" – 3:17
10. "Thursday" – 4:24
