= Stop Talking =

Studio album by Pacific Air
- Released: 2013
- Genre: Indie rock, indie pop, synthpop
- Length: 48:52
- Label: Republic Records
- Producer: Chris Zane

Pacific Air chronology
Long Live KOKO EP (2012)	Stop Talking (2013)

Stop Talking is the debut studio album by Pacific Air. It was released on June 11, 2013, after extensive promotion by the band.

== Reception ==
The album has received widely positive reviews. Listen Before You Buy said the album is "packed to the brim with infectious pop songs and reflects the carefree attitude of the long summer days" but "despite Pacific Air’s penchant for sunshine, Stop Talking isn’t the shallow album you may expect." Music review site Fist In The Air wrote that "simple riffs and melodies that just are driven home with sweet subtle harmonies. The perfect balance of sounds that encompass a terrific indie/pop record." Hypetrack wrote that Ryan and Taylor Lawhon of Pacific Air have a knack for creating "a sound that's pleasing to one's ears, doing what pop radio seldom can." Mostly Junk Food gave the album a glowing review, writing that the album is "full of the sun-kissed California pop, hypnotic melodies, wave-crushing synths and balmy melodies, Stop Talking will drench your pop pallette in sensory bliss.

== Track listing ==
No.	Title	Length
1.	"Lose My Mind"	3:05
2.	"Float"	3:18
3.	"Roses"	3:57
4.	"Move"	3:55
5.	"Sunshine"	4:12
6.	"Intermission"	2:38
7.	"Suits"	3:48
8.	"Play Nice"	4:05
9.	"Far Away"	3:59
10.	"Duet In B Minor"	3:22
11.	"So Strange"	4:10

iTunes edition bonus tracks
No.	Title	Length
12.	"Classic Soul (Bonus Track)"	3:37

Spotify bonus tracks
No.	Title	Length
13.	"Attention (Bonus Track)"	4:08
Total length:		48:52
