= Hush (Asobi Seksu album) =

Studio album by Asobi Seksu
- Released: February 17, 2009
- Recorded: 2008
- Studio: Gigantic (New York, New York)
- Genre: Dream pop
- Length: 43:30
- Label: Polyvinyl
- Producer: Chris Zane

Asobi Seksu chronology
Live at the Echo 10/6/06 (2006)	Hush (2009)	Rewolf (2009)

Singles from Hush
- 1. "Me & Mary" Released: November 17, 2008; 2. "Familiar Light" Released: February 16, 2009; 3. "Transparence" Released: August 21, 2009; 4. "Layers" Released: December 7, 2009

Professional ratings
Aggregate scores
Source	Rating
Metacritic	69/100
Review scores
Source	Rating
AllMusic	3.5/5 stars
The A.V. Club	C
The Boston Phoenix	3/4 stars
Mojo	4/5 stars
NME	6/10
Pitchfork	5.5/10
PopMatters	8/10
Q	3/5 stars
Spin	8/10
Uncut	4/5 stars

Hush is the third studio album by American shoegaze band Asobi Seksu. It was released on February 17, 2009 by Polyvinyl Record Co., marking the band's first album for the label. Hush was recorded in the summer of 2008 and was produced by Chris Zane, who had also worked on Asobi Seksu's previous album Citrus (2006). The album demonstrated a shift from the more shoegaze-inspired work of prior releases to a mellower, quieter sound.

Hush produced four singles: "Me & Mary", released on November 17, 2008; "Familiar Light", released on February 16, 2009; "Transparence", released on August 21, 2009; and "Layers", released on December 7, 2009.

== In popular culture ==
The song "Layers" was featured in the episode "The Born Identity" of the third season of the TV series Ugly Betty.

== Track listing ==
All tracks are written by Yuki Chikudate and James Hanna.

No.	Title	Length
1.	"Layers"	4:00
2.	"Familiar Light"	3:22
3.	"Sing Tomorrow's Praise"	3:34
4.	"Gliss"	4:03
5.	"Transparence"	3:48
6.	"Risky and Pretty"	0:44
7.	"In the Sky"	3:40
8.	"Meh no Mae"	4:03
9.	"Glacially"	4:18
10.	"I Can't See"	4:17
11.	"Me & Mary"	3:07
12.	"Blind Little Rain"	4:34
Total length:		43:30

Japanese edition bonus tracks
No.	Title	Length
13.	"Remember"	3:41
14.	"Breathe into Glass"	3:58
Total length:		51:09

Deluxe edition bonus tracks
No.	Title	Length
13.	"Remember"	3:41
14.	"Thursday" (acoustic)	4:23
15.	"Me & Mary" (video)	3:08
Total length:		54:42

== Credits ==
Credits are adapted from the album's liner notes.

Asobi Seksu

- Yuki Chikudate – vocals, synthesizer, organ
- James Hanna – bass, guitar, synthesizer, vocals
- Gunnar Olsen – drums

Additional musicians

- Devon Maxwell – percussion
- George Pagonis – percussion
- Chris Zane – percussion

Production

- Alex Aldi – engineering
- Greg Calbi – mastering
- Chris Zane – production, mixing

Design

- Sean McCabe – art direction, design, photography

== Charts ==
Chart (2009)	Peak position
Japanese Albums (Oricon)	190
UK Independent Albums (OCC)	35
US Heatseekers Albums (Billboard)	34
