= Crack in the Road =

Blog site for music

- Website type: Music / Culture
- Available in: English
- Headquarters: United Kingdom
- Editors: Josh Dalton; Andrew Hill; Ben Blackburn
- Website: www.crackintheroad.com
- Launched: April 2010

Crack in the Road is an independent music and culture blog-site in the United Kingdom. The site focuses on pop music, independent music and electronic music.

== History ==
Crack in the Road was started in April 2010 by Josh Dalton, whilst studying architecture at Dundee University. The site's writing, design and organisation was initially and most notably shared between Dalton, Andrew Hill, Ben Blackburn and Joel Chima.

In March 2013 the website hosted a joint unofficial SXSW day-party with Belgium blog-site Disco Naivete, featuring 4AD artist SOHN, alongside Pacific Air, Young Dreams, Eddi Front and DENA, amongst others. The website has also hosted SXSW shows featuring the likes of Hozier, The 1975, Wolf Alice, ILoveMakonnen, Christine and the Queens and Metro Boomin' amongst others.

In 2015 Crack in the Road was in the news when its editor published an article decrying the lack of female musicians in the lineup for the Reading and Leeds Music Festival, publishing a revised schedule with the all-male bands omitted.

== Unearthing New Talent ==
Crack in the Road's music content usually consists of new music posts or introducing articles on new artists. Since its formation in 2010, the website has followed several now successful artists from the beginning of their careers, including The Neighbourhood, Youth Lagoon and Pacific Air. The site also offers up interviews, live reviews and festival features. Although predominately focusing on pop music, independent music and electronic music, Crack in the Road is not restricted to specific genres, and has covered rock music and metal music in the past.

The site has been quoted on The Guardian, The Fader, Crack Magazine and Pitchfork, amongst many other music websites, and Dalton has been called on to comment as a music expert.
