= Metropolis (Swords album) =

Studio album by Swords
- Released: September 20, 2005
- Genre: Experimental rock
- Length: 46:54
- Label: Arena Rock

Swords chronology
Entertainment Is Over if You Want It (2003)	Metropolis (2005)

Professional ratings
Review scores
Source	Rating
AllMusic	link
Pitchfork	7.3/10 10 October 2005

Metropolis is the first studio album by the indie rock band Swords. It was released in 2005 on Arena Rock Recording Co. The album is the third release from the group, originally named The Swords Project.

== Track listing ==
1. "The Product of Harm" – 5:18
2. "The Mark" – 4:10
3. "Savage Republic" – 4:20
4. "Family Photographs" – 4:54
5. "untitled" – 2:10
6. "Land Speed Record" – 6:11
7. "Radio, Radio" – 3:33
8. "Greyovernight" – 4:46
9. "Metropolis" – 6:07
10. "The Last Song" – 5:25
