= Calla (album) =

Studio album by Calla
- Released: October 11, 1999; Re-issued January 20, 2004
- Recorded: 1999
- Genre: Noise rock
- Label: Sub Rosa; Arena Rock Recording Co.

Calla chronology
Calla (1999)	Scavengers (2001)

Professional ratings
Review scores
Source	Rating
AllMusic	link

Calla is the self-titled first album of the New York-based indie rock band Calla.

== Track listing ==
All tracks by Calla

1. "Tarentula" – 5:06
2. "Custom Car Crash" – 2:44
3. "June" – 4:54
4. "Only Drowning Men" – 8:01
5. "Elsewhere" – 5:33
6. "Truth About Robots" – 2:36
7. "Trinidad" – 3:16
8. "Keyes" – 3:52
9. "Awake and Under" – 3:53

== Personnel ==
- Sean Donovan – Bass, Keyboards, Programming, Engineer
- Aurelio Valle – Guitar, Vocals
