= The Boggs =

American rock band

- Origin: New York City, United States
- Genres: Indie rock
- Years active: 2001–present
- Labels: Arena Rock Recording Company City Rockers, Gigantic Music
- Website: myspace.com/theboggs

The Boggs is an independent rock band from New York City formed by Jason Friedman in 2001. Original band members Friedman, Ezekiel Healy, Bradford Conroy and Phil Roebuck met as subway buskers in New York and became a part of the then burgeoning "New New York" scene that included groups like The Rapture, Yeah Yeah Yeahs, Calla, Interpol, and The Walkmen.

Their debut album We Are The Boggs We Are (Arena Rock Recording Co.) was a punk re-telling of Harry Smith’s Anthology of American Folk Music that the band mockingly dubbed ‘Archival no-wave’. The Boggs also contributed a compilation track for This Is Next Year: A Brooklyn-Based Compilation in 2001 (Arena Rock Recording Co.).

The follow-up, Stitches, recast the band's sound as a type of acoustic post-punk. Some reviews compared the record to a more artsy Pogues or more country-blues based Echo & the Bunnymen.

Their third album "Forts", once again recast the sound of the band. The band's official biography found on their Myspace page describes it as, "proto post folk garage punk folk punk blues and disco."

In 2010, Robert Plant adapted the Boggs' song "How Long" for the track "Central Two O Nine" on his album "Band Of Joy" listing Jason Friedman as a co-writer with Plant and Steven Miller.

== Members ==
After 2005, The Boggs had a constantly rotating live line up that sometimes includes members of other established independent rock bands. Guitarist, singer, and songwriter Jason Friedman was the only constant member of The Boggs. Some former members of the band include Ezekiel Healy (guitarist), Brad Conroy (drums), Matt Schulz (drums) of Enon, Sam Jayne (guitar) of Love As Laughter, David Lloyd (bass) of Cause for Applause, Heather D’Angelo (vocals/keyboards) of Au Revoir Simone, keyboardist/vocalist Elleanore Everdell.

== History ==
The first Boggs' recordings were made by Friedman in his bedroom using a tape to tape deck and a pair of headphones as a microphone. Friedman was looking for people to help record and perform this material when he met Ezekiel Healy (slide guitar) Brad Conroy (drums) and Phillip Roebuck (banjo) while busking in the New York City Subway. The four recorded the debut record three months later. David Lloyd (bass) replaced Roebuck immediately following the recording of We Are The Boggs We Are and was present for the recording of Stitches released in the UK in 2003. Stitches again received critical attention, but The Boggs’ record label City Rockers was in financial trouble and soon went out of business. Following the collapse of City Rockers, Friedman relocated to Berlin where he spent the next two years recording the album Forts. Forts was released in the U.S. May 8, 2007 on Gigantic Music.

Friedman and singer Eleanore Everdell went on to form the band The Hundred in the Hands and signed to WARP Records in 2010.

The Shy Child remix of "Arm in Arm" is featured in Grand Theft Auto IV.

== Discography ==
- We Are The Boggs We Are (2002)
- Stitches (2003)
- Forts (2007)
