= This Desert =

EP by The Hundred in the Hands
- Released: May 17, 2010
- Genre: Synthpop; indie pop; indie rock; dream pop; post-punk revival
- Length: 22:32
- Label: Warp
- Producer: Eric Broucek; The Hundred in the Hands; Jacques Renault

The Hundred in the Hands chronology
This Desert (2010)	The Hundred in the Hands (2010)

Professional ratings
Review scores
Source	Rating
AllMusic	3.5/5 stars
Drowned in Sound	8/10
PopMatters	8/10

This Desert is the debut extended play (EP) by American electronic music duo The Hundred in the Hands. It was released on May 17, 2010, by Warp. In an interview with Spinner, band member Jason Friedman said, "As we finished the EP and album, we saw that we had two different sounds. The EP is more washed-out with reverb and delays, and the album is crisper and more immediate, like 'Dresden.'" Two songs from the EP, "Tom Tom" and "Sleepwalkers", were included as bonus tracks on the iTunes edition of the duo's eponymous debut album.

== Track listing ==
All tracks are written by Jason Friedman and Eleanore Everdell.

No.	Title	Producer(s)	Length
1.	"Building in L.O.V.E."	THITH	3:28
2.	"Tom Tom"	THITH; Jacques Renault	3:40
3.	"Ghosts"	THITH	3:50
4.	"Sleepwalkers"	Eric Broucek; THITH	3:54
5.	"In to It"	THITH	4:05
6.	"It's Only Everything"	THITH	3:35

== Personnel ==
Credits adapted from the liner notes of This Desert.

The Hundred in the Hands

- The Hundred in the Hands – production (all tracks); engineering (tracks 1, 3, 5, 6); additional engineering (track 4)
- Eleanore Everdell – vocals, keyboards, synthesizer
- Jason Friedman – bass, beats production, guitar, programming

Additional personnel

- Alex Aldi – engineering (track 2); assistant engineering (track 3)
- Eric Broucek – additional engineering (tracks 1, 5, 6); additional programming (tracks 1, 2, 5, 6); mixing (tracks 1, 2, 4–6); engineering, production (track 4)
- William Kuehn – live drums (tracks 1, 4)
- Keith McColl – executive producer
- Jacques Renault – additional programming, production (track 2)
- Vito Roccoforte – live drums (track 5)
- Noel Summerville – mastering
- Chris Zane – engineering (track 2); additional engineering, mixing (track 3)
