= The Hundred in the Hands (album) =

Studio album by The Hundred in the Hands
- Released: September 11, 2010
- Genre: Synthpop; indietronica; indie rock; indie pop; dream pop; post-punk revival
- Length: 41:40
- Label: Warp
- Producer: Eric Broucek; The Hundred in the Hands; Jacques Renault; Richard X; Chris Zane

The Hundred in the Hands chronology
This Desert (2010)	The Hundred in the Hands (2010)	Red Night (2012)

Singles from The Hundred in the Hands
- 1. "Dressed in Dresden"/"Undressed in Dresden" Released: March 2009; 2. "Dressed in Dresden" Released: April 5, 2010; 3. "Pigeons" Released: September 13, 2010; 4. "Commotion"/"Aggravation" Released: November 15, 2010

Professional ratings
Aggregate scores
Source	Rating
Metacritic	74/100
Review scores
Source	Rating
AllMusic	3/5 stars
Clash	7/10
Drowned in Sound	8/10
The Fly	3.5/5 stars
musicOMH	3.5/5 stars
The Phoenix	2.5/4 stars
Pitchfork Media	4.3/10
PopMatters	8/10
Spin	7/10
URB	4.5/5 stars

The Hundred in the Hands is the eponymous debut studio album by American electronic music duo The Hundred in the Hands, released on September 11, 2010, by Warp. The album received generally favorable reviews, with a Metacritic score of 74 out of 100, based on 13 reviews. In January 2011, the album earned the duo a nomination in the Pop/Rock category at The 10th Annual Independent Music Awards. The song "Pigeons" was used in the third episode of the fifth season of Gossip Girl, titled "The Jewel of Denial" and originally aired October 10, 2011.

== Track listing ==
All tracks are written by Jason Friedman and Eleanore Everdell.

No.	Title	Producer(s)	Length
1.	"Young Aren't Young"	Richard X; THITH; Jacques Renault^{[a]}	4:24
2.	"Lovesick (Once Again)"	THITH	4:00
3.	"Killing It"	THITH	3:37
4.	"Pigeons"	Richard X; THITH	3:28
5.	"Commotion"	Richard X; THITH	4:45
6.	"This Day Is Made"	Eric Broucek; THITH	3:56
7.	"Dead Ending"	Broucek; THITH; Renault; Utters^{[a]}	4:08
8.	"Gold Blood"	Richard X; THITH	3:22
9.	"Dressed in Dresden"	Chris Zane; THITH	3:31
10.	"Last City"	Zane; THITH	3:40
11.	"The Beach"	THITH; Richard X^{[a]}	2:49

iTunes Store bonus tracks
No.	Title	Producer(s)	Length
12.	"Tom Tom"	THITH; Renault	3:40
13.	"Sleepwalkers"	Broucek; THITH	3:53
14.	"Pigeons" (Foals XIII Remix)		6:24

Japanese edition bonus tracks
No.	Title	Producer(s)	Length
12.	"In to It" (Acapella Version)		4:01
13.	"Undressed in Dresden"	Zane; Alex Aldi; THITH	5:30

Notes

- ^{^a} signifies an additional producer

== Personnel ==
Credits adapted from the liner notes of The Hundred in the Hands.

The Hundred in the Hands

- The Hundred in the Hands – production (all tracks); engineering (tracks 2, 3, 5, 8, 11); additional engineering (tracks 6, 10)
- Eleanore Everdell – vocals, keyboards, synthesizer
- Jason Friedman – bass, guitar, programming

Additional personnel

- Alex Aldi – engineering (tracks 4, 9, 10); mixing (tracks 9, 10); programming (track 9)
- Eric Broucek – engineering, production (tracks 6, 7); mixing (tracks 2, 3, 6, 7); additional engineering (tracks 2, 3); additional programming (tracks 2, 3, 6)
- Heather Culp – photography
- Pete Hofmann – mixing (tracks 1, 3, 4, 8, 11)
- Jacques Renault – additional production, engineering (track 1); additional programming (tracks 1, 7); additional engineering, production (track 7)
- Richard X – additional programming, production (tracks 1, 4, 5, 8); engineering (track 1); additional engineering (tracks 4, 5, 8); additional production (track 11)
- Vito Roccoforte – live drums (tracks 1, 2, 4, 5, 8)
- Noel Summerville – mastering
- Utters – additional engineering, additional production, additional programming (track 7)
- Chris Zane – engineering (tracks 4, 9, 10); live drums, mixing, production (tracks 9, 10); programming (track 9)

== Release history ==
Region	Date	Label
Japan	September 11, 2010	Warp
Germany	September 17, 2010	Warp
United Kingdom	September 20, 2010	Warp
United States	September 21, 2010	Warp
Australia	October 1, 2010	Warp
