= Therriault =

Therriault is a surname. Notable people with the surname include:

- Daniel Therriault (born 1953), American playwright, screenwriter and actor
- Devin Therriault (born 1988/89), American musician
- Gene Therriault (born 1960), American politician
- Michael Therriault, Canadian actor
