= Noise Won't Stop =

Studio album by Shy Child
- Released: 2007
- Recorded: Gigantic Studios, Engine Room, New York
- Genre: Alternative dance, electronica, synthpop
- Length: 39:36
- Label: Wall of Sound
- Producer: Chris Zane

Shy Child chronology
One with the Sun (2004)	Noise Won't Stop (2007)	Liquid Love (2010)

Noise Won't Stop is the third studio album by New York City electronica duo Shy Child.

== Release ==
The album was the first by the band to be released in the UK, leading many to erroneously believe that it was the band's first album. The album was also released in the US and Japan.

== Track listing ==
1. "Drop the Phone" - 3:03
2. "Pressure to Come" - 3:26
3. "Kick Drum (Featuring Spank Rock)" - 3:23
4. "The Volume" - 3:07
5. "Generation Y (We Got It)" - 3:08
6. "Astronaut" - 3:29
7. "Good and Evil" - 3:23
8. "Noise Won't Stop" - 3:21
9. "Summer" - 3:47
10. "What's It Feel Like?" - 5:00
11. "Cause and Effect" - 5:09
- Tracks 8 and 9 appeared on the band's previous album, One with the Sun.
- Tracks 1 and 6 feature Saxophone by Seth Misterka.

== Critical reception ==
Professional ratings
Review scores
Source	Rating
Drowned in Sound	link
musicOMH	link
Pitchfork Media	(8.0/10) link

Reviews of the album have been generally positive. Pitchfork Media gave the album 8/10, stating "it's when Shy Child's grip on songcraft grows extremely tenuous that their music becomes interesting, even thrilling". Drowned in Sound expressed similar praise: "And that’s the irony, y’see: the noise did stop. But, by god, you wish it hadn’t."
