= Live at the Echo 10/6/06 =

Spaceland Presents: At the Echo October 6th, 2006

Live album by Asobi Seksu
- Released: October 31, 2006
- Recorded: October 6, 2006
- Genres: Indie rock, shoegaze
- Labels: Spaceland Recordings, KUFALA Recordings

Asobi Seksu chronology
Citrus (2006)	Spaceland Presents: At the Echo October 6th, 2006 (2006)	Hush (2009)

Spaceland Presents: At the Echo October 6, 2006 is the first live album by New York-based shoegaze band Asobi Seksu. It was recorded at The Echo in Los Angeles, California. It contains mostly material from the Citrus album, plus two songs from their self-titled debut and a cover of a song by The Crystals.

In 2007, it was reissued by KUFALA Recordings.

== Track listing ==
All songs written by Asobi Seksu, except where noted.

1. "Intro" – 1:31
2. "New Years" – 3:06
3. "Strawberries" – 3:33
4. "Pink Cloud Tracing Paper" – 3:45
5. "Strings" – 4:56
6. "Nefi + Girly" – 4:45
7. "Sooner" – 3:29
8. "Thursday" – 4:32
9. "Goodbye" – 4:03
10. "I'm Happy but You Don't Like Me" – 2:58
11. "Red Sea" – 7:49
12. "Then He Kissed Me" (Phil Spector, Jeff Barry, Ellie Greenwich) – 3:01
