= Entertainment Is Over If You Want It =

Studio album by Swords
- Released: May 20, 2003
- Genre: Experimental rock
- Length: 42:05
- Label: Arena Rock

Swords chronology
The Swords Project EP (2001)	Entertainment Is Over If You Want It (2003)	Metropolis (2005)

Professional ratings
Review scores
Source	Rating
AllMusic	4/5 stars
Pitchfork	(7.7/10)

Entertainment Is Over If You Want It is the first LP from the band The Swords Project (now named simply Swords), but the second release from the group.

== Track listing ==
1. "01." – 1:30
2. "City Life" – 4:18
3. "MD11" – 5:41
4. "Cocktails & Shuttlecocks" – 6:13
5. "Audience of One" – 10:15
6. "Immigracion" – 4:35
7. "New Shapes" – 9:31
