= Fluorescence (album) =

Studio album by Asobi Seksu
- Released: February 14, 2011
- Studios: Gigantic (New York, New York)
- Genres: Shoegaze; dream pop
- Length: 46:33
- Label: Polyvinyl
- Producer: Chris Zane

Asobi Seksu chronology
Rewolf (2009)	Fluorescence (2011)

Singles from Fluorescence
- 1. "Trails" Released: January 17, 2011; 2. "Perfectly Crystal" Released: May 9, 2011

Professional ratings
Aggregate scores
Source	Rating
AnyDecentMusic?	6.1/10
Metacritic	64/100
Review scores
Source	Rating
AllMusic	3/5 stars
Consequence	4/5 stars
DIY	7/10
The Irish Times	3/5 stars
MusicOMH	4/5 stars
NME	7/10
Pitchfork	6.3/10
Q	2/5 stars
Spin	7/10
Uncut	3/5 stars

Fluorescence is the fourth and final studio album by American shoegaze band Asobi Seksu. It was released on February 14, 2011, by Polyvinyl Record Co.

The artwork for Fluorescence was designed by Vaughan Oliver, noted for his album covers for the 4AD label.

Two singles were released from the album: "Trails" on January 17, 2011, and "Perfectly Crystal" on May 9, 2011.

== Track listing ==
All tracks are written by Yuki Chikudate and James Hanna.

No.	Title	Length
1.	"Coming Up"	4:04
2.	"Trails"	3:59
3.	"My Baby"	3:38
4.	"Perfectly Crystal"	3:50
5.	"In My Head"	2:56
6.	"Leave the Drummer Out There"	6:43
7.	"Sighs"	3:51
8.	"Deep Weird Sleep"	1:59
9.	"Counterglow"	4:10
10.	"Ocean"	4:10
11.	"Trance Out"	2:44
12.	"Pink Light"	4:29
Total length:		46:33

Japanese edition bonus tracks
No.	Title	Length
4.	"Perfectly Crystal" (Japanese version)	3:50
13.	"All Around"	2:16
Total length:		52:39

Deluxe edition bonus tracks
No.	Title	Length
13.	"All Around"	2:16
14.	"Trails" (Deerhoof remix)	3:09
Total length:		51:58

Notes

- On the Japanese edition of the album, the Japanese version of "Perfectly Crystal" appears as track four, while the original English version appears as track 14.

== Credits ==
Credits are adapted from the album's liner notes.

Asobi Seksu

- Yuki Chikudate – vocals, synthesizer, organ
- Larry Gorman – drums, percussion, additional vocals on "Trails"
- James Hanna – guitar, synthesizer, vocals
- Billy Pavone – bass

Additional musicians

- Paul Dateh – violin
- Kevin Farrell – double bass
- Devin Maxwell – percussion
- Chris Zane – percussion

Production

- Greg Calbi – mastering
- Tamon Imai – engineering (assistant)
- Chris Zane – production, mixing, recording

Design

- Marc Atkins – photography
- Christaan Felber – photography (band portraits)
- Vaughan Oliver – art direction, design

== Charts ==
Chart (2011)	Peak position
US Heatseekers Albums (Billboard)	49
