= Yuki Chikudate =

Japanese musician

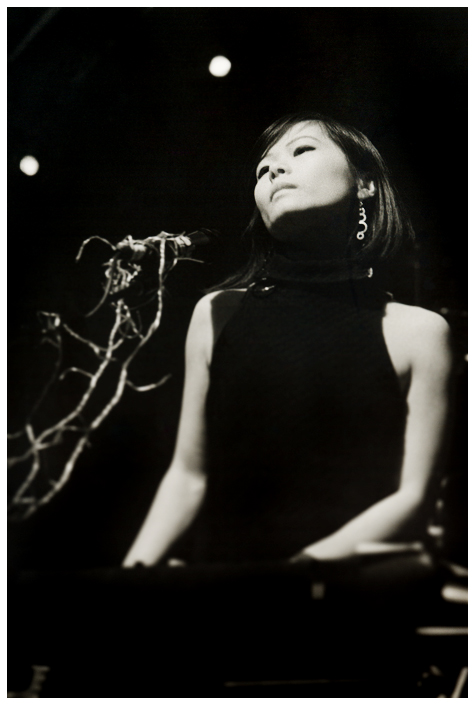
- Yuki Chikudate with Asobi Seksu onstage, 2006

Background information
- Born: Okinawa, Japan
- Genres: Shoegazing, dream pop
- Occupation: Musician
- Instruments: Vocals, keyboards
- Years active: 2001–present

Yuki Chikudate (筑館 祐樹, Chikudate Yūki) is a Japanese musician. She was the main vocalist and keyboardist of the dream pop band Asobi Seksu.

== Musical career ==
In 2001, she founded the dream pop band Asobi Seksu with guitarist James Hanna, bassist Glenn Waldman and drummer Keith Hopkin. The band released their debut album in 2004. The following album, Citrus was released in 2006, after a lineup change. The band released Hush and Fluorescence in 2009 and 2011, respectively, after a second lineup change. In 2013, the band announced an indefinite hiatus.

== Personal life ==
Chikudate was born in Japan to an Okinawan mother, and has stated that apart from her mother, most of her maternal relatives reside in Okinawa. In her early childhood, she moved to Southern California with her parents and spent her childhood there. At age 16, she moved to New York by herself, leaving behind her family.
