= Trading Change =

Studio album by Jeremy Loops
- Released: March 2014
- Genre: Jazz; funk; soul; blues; pop; hip hop
- Language: English
- Label: Sheer Sound

Jeremy Loops chronology
Trading Change (2014)	Critical As Water (2018)

Professional ratings
Review scores
Source	Rating
PopMatters	7/10 stars
GIGsoup	4/5 stars

Trading Change is the debut studio album by South African singer-songwriter Jeremy Loops. It received positive reviews from critics and debuted at no. 1 in South Africa.

== Track listing ==
No.	Title	Length
1.	"Sinner"	2:33
2.	"Power"	3:15
3.	"Down South" (featuring Motheo Moleko)	4:01
4.	"Trip Fox"	3:46
5.	"Mission to the Sun" (featuring Jamie Faull)	3:28
6.	"Lonesome & Blue" (featuring Adelle Nqeto)	3:11
7.	"Skinny Blues"	3:09
8.	"Higher Stakes"	4:26
9.	"Running Away" (featuring Motheo Moleko)	3:40
10.	"Killer Killer"	3:24
11.	"My Shoes" (featuring Motheo Moleko)	3:46
12.	"Basil"	4:06

== Charts ==
Chart (2016)	Peak position
Dutch Albums (Album Top 100)	93
Swiss Albums (Schweizer Hitparade)	51
