= Televise (album) =

Studio album by Calla
- Released: January 28, 2003
- Genre: Noise rock
- Length: 46:08
- Label: Arena Rock Recording Co.

Calla chronology
Scavengers (2001)	Televise (2003)	Collisions (2005)

Professional ratings
Aggregate scores
Source	Rating
Metacritic	73/100 link
Review scores
Source	Rating
AllMusic	3.0/5 stars
Blender	4/5 stars
Pitchfork	7.5/10

Televise is the third album from New York-based Calla.

== Track listing ==
1. "Strangler" – 4:24
2. "Monument" – 3:40
3. "Astral" – 4:35
4. "Don't Hold Your Breath" – 4:48
5. "Pete the Killer" – 3:30
6. "Customized" – 4:56
7. "As Quick as It Comes/Carrera" – 6:23
8. "Alacran" – 1:13
9. "Televised" – 6:22
10. "Surface Scratch" – 6:13
