= Pee Shy =

American indie pop band

- Left to right: Jenny Juristo, Mary Guidera, Cindy Wheeler (1996)

Background information
- Origin: Tampa, Florida, U.S.
- Genres: Alternative; Indie pop Accordion; Clarinet
- Years active: 1993–1998
- Labels: Mercury Records/Blue Gorilla; Screw Music Forever
- Members: Cindy Wheeler (accordion, guitar, lead vocals); Jenny Juristo Morrison (clarinet, keyboards, guitar, accordion, vocals); Mary Catherine Guidera (bass, slide guitar, synthesizer, vocals); Billy Orrico (drums, vocals 1997-98); Bil Bowman (drums, 1994-1996)

Pee Shy (1993–1998) were an indie pop band from Tampa, Florida, whose clever, literate lyrics and unorthodox if primitive instrumentation led them to a brief major label career that ended just as they were attracting national commercial radio airplay. They released two albums for Mercury Records, played with artists including Stereolab, Luna, the Village People and Shannon Wright, and twice performed at the annual South by Southwest music festival in Austin, Texas. Their second album, Don't Get Too Comfortable, peaked at No. 2 in the national college music charts in February 1998.

== History ==
=== Origins ===
Pee Shy began as a duo: Cindy Wheeler, a poet and bookstore owner in Tampa's trendy Ybor City neighborhood, primarily played accordion and sang lead vocals, while Jenny Juristo, a community radio DJ who was training to be a speech-language pathologist, played clarinet and keyboards and occasionally sang lead. (Juristo became Jenny Juristo Morrison following her 1997 marriage to fellow Tampa musician Eric Morrison, of the band Home.)

"We talked a lot about doing music together, but I didn't know how to play any instruments," Wheeler recalled in an interview. "I started house sitting for some friends of mine at some point and they had an accordion. I kind of started teaching myself how to play it, just kind of fooling around—Jenny came over with her clarinet and we tried writing some original stuff together." Their first public performance as Pee Shy was on September 23, 1993, at the weekly Thirsty Ear poetry reading in Ybor City's Eighth Avenue Bistro.

In 1994 and 1995, the band expanded to four members and added guitars, bass and drums to its musical arsenal, creating what one journalist called "a sweet circus of clarinets, guitars and little girl voices." Early influences such as Alice Cooper, Guided by Voices, Daniel Johnston and Tsunami yielded a melancholy yet at times absurdly joyful atmosphere to the band's concerts and recordings, in which tales of youthful boyfriends, fatal car crashes and piñata-like hearts would mix with alien abductions and Wheeler's obscenity-laden response to men who harass women on the street.

=== Major label contract ===
Who Let All the Monkeys Out?, released on April 2, 1996.

Though some local critics initially regarded the band's performances as "campy" and ragged, within little more than a year Pee Shy's two cassette demos and modest touring had begun attracting national attention. This manifested itself in a spread in Interview magazine in December 1994, along with what Wheeler later called a "bidding war" between Sony and PolyGram.

The members eventually signed a contract with PolyGram's Mercury Records label, and in the spring of 1995 flew to New York City to record their first album, Who Let All the Monkeys Out? The first single was to be Little Dudes, a song Wheeler had written about her and Juristo's taste in younger boyfriends.

That album, produced by Galaxie 500 and Luna frontman Dean Wareham, was not released until April 2, 1996, nearly a year later. In the meantime, Pee Shy released the vinyl 7-inch Yellow Race Car on the small, Tampa-based label Screw Music Forever, containing two Wareham-produced songs that had not made it onto Monkeys. On their own initiative, they also made their first appearance at South by Southwest in March 1996, an occasion made memorable when Juristo and Wheeler accidentally tumbled to the stage at the end of their set. "For any other band, it would have been an embarrassing show-stopper of an accident," the St. Petersburg Times reported. "For Pee Shy, it was an eye-catching, climactic moment."

Despite positive national reviews and Mercury's stated belief that Little Dudes (finally released in November) was "a potential sleeper hit," Monkeys sold only about 1,000 copies during the first four months after its release, according to the SoundScan tracking service. At least one industry observer called Pee Shy a victim of bad timing, since its album came out just as alternative music was experiencing a decline in sales, but Juristo said the band had learned to be "more aggressive and consistent" with the next album—if there was one.

=== New York and a new album ===
Don't Get Too Comfortable, released January 1998.

Hoping proximity might persuade the label to keep them on, Pee Shy departed Tampa Bay for New York City after holding a farewell concert at the State Theater in St. Petersburg on August 2, 1996. The band soon underwent a personnel change as well: Drummer Bil Bowman never made the trip north, and his role went to newcomer Billy Orrico.

In the end, the band members' hopes were fulfilled, and Mercury released Pee Shy's second album, Don't Get Too Comfortable, on January 27, 1998.

Produced by Brad Jones, who had worked on albums for bands such as Yo La Tengo, Comfortable featured a crunchier, poppier, more guitar-driven sound than Monkeys and received generally much improved reviews. The Village Voice called it "a phenomenal upgrade" and remarked that "Pee Shy make sexiness and marketability look cool and substantive," although the newspaper's critic also criticized the band as "introverted." Veteran Voice music critic Robert Christgau listed two of Wheeler's songs from the album—the peppy love-gone-wrong lament Mr. Whisper and the mellower Much Obliged—as "choice cuts," alongside We've Got It Goin' On by the Backstreet Boys.

Mr. Whisper also received some airplay on commercial radio stations nationwide, including KROQ-FM in Los Angeles. Another of Wheeler's songs, Rope Waltz, played in the background of a scene that year on the television series Melrose Place.

In March 1998, Pee Shy performed for a second time at South by Southwest, to an audience that included the Indigo Girls' Amy Ray. This show was broadcast on the World Wide Web by RollingStone.com.

=== Breaking up ===
Despite this apparent success, Pee Shy broke up later in 1998 for reasons Wheeler and Juristo would decline to discuss in detail.

"We couldn't play a damn thing when we started, but the core of the talent was more of an energy, like a will," Juristo Morrison told the St. Petersburg Times in 2002. In the end, she told the newspaper: "We stopped having fun. ... It was a natural deterioration; it was time to stop."

Wheeler, Orrico and bass player Mary Catherine Guidera initially continued performing under the name 3 Wheeler, recording a demo that would not be released until late 2007. Wheeler and Guidera have since attracted a following as leaders of a Brooklyn-based band called the Caulfield Sisters.

Juristo Morrison has continued recording and performing solo under the name GoJenny, and revived her radio show as an Internet broadcast in May 2005. She also has performed and recorded with musicians such as Megan Reilly and with bands such as Capt Qitn, Leels and the 100% Storms Ensemble.

Orrico is a New York–based television and film Dialogue Editor and has won two time Primetime Emmy awards for excellence in Sound Editing. He lives in New Jersey with his wife and son and is currently the touring and recording drummer for the 70's classic rock band ANGEL. He also continues to write and record his own original songs in his home studio.

Bowman relocated to Northern California and has been involved with bands Caroliner Rainbow, The Zodiac Killers (featuring Greg Lowery, formerly of Supercharger and The Rip-Offs), avant-metalers Blackqueen (with guitarist Pete Jay, formerly of Assück) and Dimes, an instrumental project featuring guitarist Nolan Cook of The Residents. He currently is a member of the dark progressive rock band Human Anomaly, featuring ex-Noothgrush members. Bowman is also one-third of the heavy rock trio Totimoshi, who are signed to Volcom Records.

== Noteworthy aspects ==
The band's name drew no end of grief from label executives and music critics, and even prompted a columnist in The Tampa Tribune to bemoan "the decay of morality" demonstrated by "increasingly dicey" band names "a la Butthole Surfers, Pee Shy and others." Band members explained that the name originated from a nickname that Wheeler had received from an old boyfriend. In their early days they also performed a song called "Pee Shy," in which urinary reticence became a metaphor for unexpressed longing—as exemplified in the crucial line, "If you won't leave, I can't start." The band apparently never recorded this song.

A December 2000 article in the Journal of Contemporary Ethnography, examining Ybor City's "bohemian" culture of the mid-1990s, held up Pee Shy as a prototypical "DIY band turned corporate sellout," at least in the sense that the members' decision to sign with a major label had been controversial with some of their friends and indie rock compatriots.

Pee Shy's primary musical innovation may have been accordion feedback, a yowling, oscillating sound that Wheeler created by pressing the instrument against a speaker as she played.

According to Wheeler, in 2003 the director Robert Altman sought to use seven seconds of Mr. Whisper in the soundtrack to his ballet film The Company, starring Neve Campbell. But the Universal Music Group, which by then had acquired PolyGram, refused to waive its $10,000 fee.

== Discography ==
=== Albums ===
- Don't Look! It's Pee Shy demo tape, 1994
- For Those Afraid to Rock, Pee Shy Salutes You demo tape, 1994
- Who Let All the Monkeys Out? CD (Mercury/Blue Gorilla), 1996
- Don't Get Too Comfortable CD (Mercury/Blue Gorilla), 1998

=== Singles ===
- Yellow Race Car b/w Back of Your Guitar 7-inch (Screw Music Forever), 1995
- Little Dudes promo CD single (Mercury/Blue Gorilla), 1996
- Shazzam, split 7-inch with Home (Turducken Recordings), 1996
- Mr. Whisper b/w Little Dudes cassette single (Mercury/Blue Gorilla), 1998

=== Known bootlegs ===
- CD release party at The Rubb, April 4, 1996
- Live Under the Brooklyn Bridge, July 1996
- Farewell to Tampa Bay, August 2, 1996
- Live at SXSW, March 1998
