= This Is Next Year: A Brooklyn-Based Compilation =

Compilation album by Various
- Released: July 17, 2001
- Label: Arena Rock Recording Co.

Professional ratings
Review scores
Source	Rating
Allmusic	4/5 stars
Entertainment Weekly	B+

This Is Next Year is a compilation album released July 17, 2001, by Arena Rock Recording Co.

Interpol, The Walkmen, and French Kicks all released debut albums within a year of This Is Next Year's release. Contributing artists were largely from neighborhoods near to the bridges between Brooklyn and Manhattan.

According to Time Out, who interviewed several contributors and the owner of Arena Rock, the album was evidence of a "musical renaissance" Brooklyn had been experiencing since the late 1990s.

== Reception ==
Brian Raftery of Entertainment Weekly said the "collection unearths a trove of local talent", noting that Brooklyn was normally associated with hip-hop. Ann Powers of The New York Times said the album had "something for everyone who likes music that rocks with brains and style." She also notes the lack of hip-hop and calls the album "monochromatic".

However, Stephen Cramer of AllMusic, points out that "the diversity of sounds coming out of the New York City borough is evident", describing "I've Got a Fang" by They Might Be Giants as a "hard rocker" and the following "soft and serene folk song", "Wasting In The Sun" by Folksongs For The Afterlife.

== Track listing ==
=== Disc 1 ===
1. "Radio" – The Walkmen
2. "I've Got A Fang (Demo)" – They Might Be Giants
3. "Wasting In The Sun" – Folksongs For The Afterlife
4. "Keep Your Feelings To Yourself" – Clem Snide
5. "Muddy Blue" – A.M. Radio (later renamed Icewater Scandal)
6. "Hey Man" – Grand Mal
7. "Go Shopping" – The Mendoza Line
8. "Radiate" – Weeds Of Eden
9. "Awake And Under" – Calla
10. "She Blinded Me with Science" – Ex Models
11. "Twin Stars" – Bee and Flower
12. "Like Your Mom" – Hoagy
13. "Sky To Ground" – Geometry
14. "It's All Made Up" – Scout
15. "No Sleeves" – Les Savy Fav
16. "Artificial Light" – Rainer Maria
17. "Painted Flowers" – Cub Country
18. "New York Avenue Playground" – Cindy Wheeler
19. "It's Not About Love (It's About Love)" – The Seconds
20. "Spanish Conversation" – Hub
21. "Johnny Shot The Mexican" – Reverend Vince Anderson

=== Disc 2 ===
1. "Bound For Brighter Days" – The Boggs
2. "Problems" – Ben Kweller
3. "1985" – French Kicks
4. "Snail" – Mink Lungs
5. "False Porno Alarm (Surgery Mix)" – Stereobate
6. "Hard To Be Easy" – Champale
7. "Hearts Don't Break" – Ida
8. "Factory Farm" – Jumbo Jets
9. "Three Ears" – Elk City
10. "Horsey" – Hem
11. "The Wind" – The Birdwatcher
12. "New York's Alright (If You Like Saxophones)" – Enon
13. "Down In The Mud" – Gloria Deluxe
14. "A Time To Be So Small" – Interpol
15. "Blizzard Of '77" – Nada Surf
16. "Kite" – Mascott
17. "Gin I Win" – Timesbold
18. "Vanish" – Black Beetle
19. "Cellar Door" – Laura Cantrell
20. "Don't Believe A Word" – Blasco
21. "Brooklyn" – Home
22. "(Untitled)"
