= Strength in Numbers (Calla album) =

Studio album by Calla
- Released: February 20, 2007
- Genre: Indie rock
- Length: 52:48
- Label: Beggars Banquet Records

Calla chronology
Collisions (2005)	Strength in Numbers (2007)

Professional ratings
Review scores
Source	Rating
AllMusic	link
Indiecision	B+ link

Strength in Numbers, is the fifth album from New York-based Calla.

== Track listing ==
1. "Sanctify" – 4:39
2. "Defences Down" – 4:30
3. "Sylvia's Song" – 3:55
4. "Sleep in Splendor" – 5:22
5. "Rise" – 3:58
6. "Stand Paralyzed" – 3:21
7. "Bronson" – 4:12
8. "Malo" – 2:01
9. "Malicious Manner" – 3:26
10. "A Sure Shot" – 5:22
11. "Le Gusta el Fuego" – 2:41
12. "Simone" – 4:21
13. "Dancers in the Dust" – 4:53
