= Jeremy Loops =

South African singer-songwriter and record producer

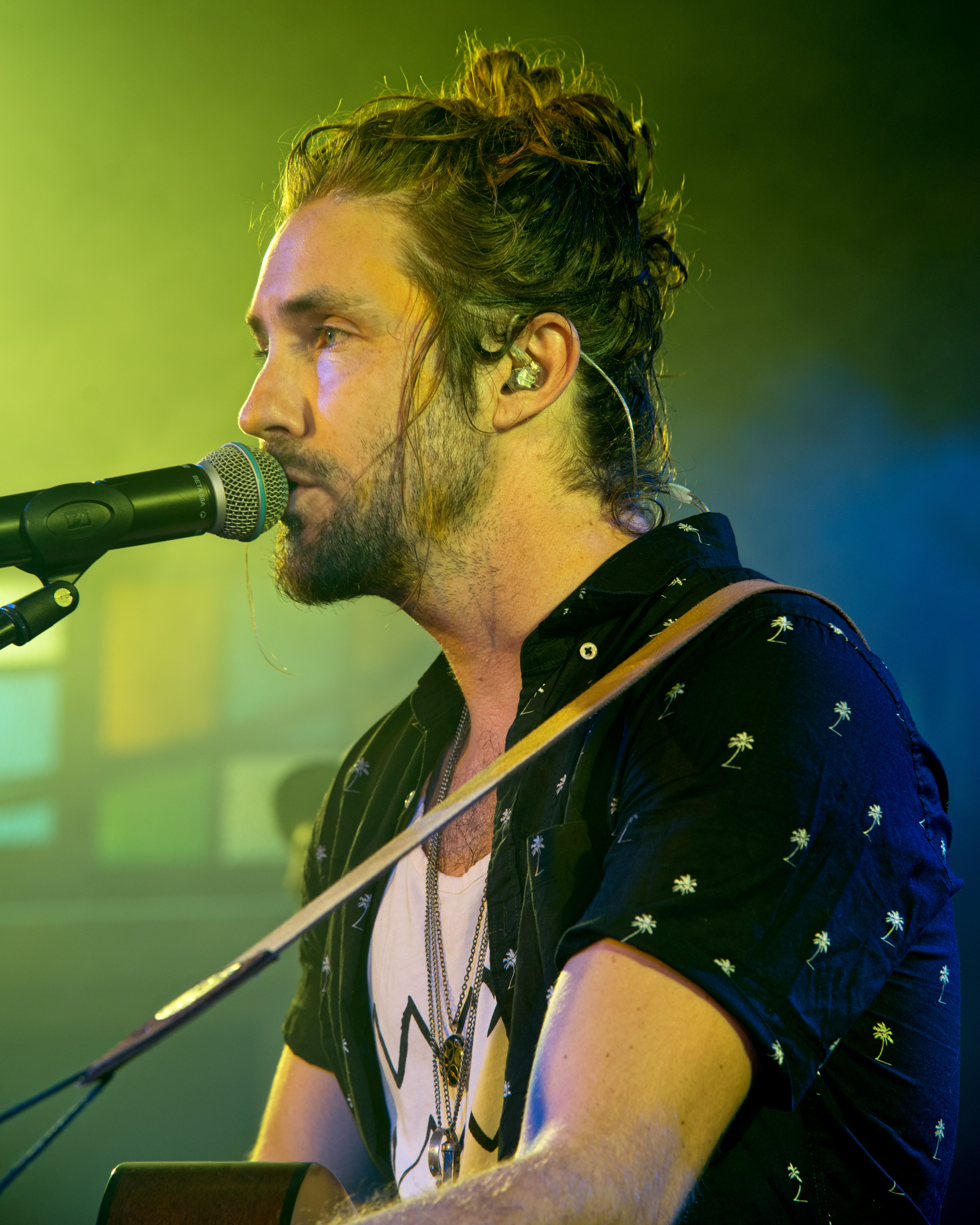
- Hewitt performing in 2017

Background information
- Born: Jeremy Thomas Hewitt; 4 March 1984 (age 42); Kommetjie, Cape Town, South Africa
- Genres: Funk; soul; jazz; pop; hip hop
- Occupations: Singer; songwriter; record producer
- Instruments: Vocals, guitar, harmonika
- Years active: 2009–present
- Website: www.jeremyloops.com

Jeremy Thomas Hewitt (born March 4, 1984) known by his stage name Jeremy Loops, is a South African singer, songwriter, and record producer.

In 2011, Loops released his self-titled EP. His debut album Trading Change was released March 2014 in South Africa. The album was released in North America and South America via Yebo Music in August 2015, and in Europe and Australia in February 2016. He toured the United States as a support slot on Rebelution's "Winter Greens Tour", followed with two headline US tours of his own, The Jeremy Loops US Tour and the Trading Change Tour. He ended 2015 supporting Twenty One Pilots on the European leg of their Blurryface Tour. With three shows remaining, the tour was cancelled following the November 2015 Paris attacks.

Loops announced Continental Drift, his first headlining tour of Europe, which took place in January 2016. The Trading Change Tour, his second headlining tour of Europe and his maiden tour of Australia, took place in October and November 2016.

== Early life ==
Loops was born and raised in Kommetjie, South Africa, a small surf town in the greater Cape Town metropolis. The eldest of three children, he has a Swiss mother and a South African father. Jeremy attended the University of Cape Town, where he graduated with a degree in Finance and Property Development.

== Music career ==
=== 2024: "Go Again" Single Released ===
"Go Again" is a single by South African singer-songwriter Jeremy Loops, released in 2024. The track is notable for its uplifting themes of resilience and hope, encapsulating the spirit of perseverance through life's challenges. It is part of Jeremy Loops' upcoming album and reflects the artist's experiences during the COVID-19 pandemic and subsequent social unrest.

=== 2009–2010: Career beginnings ===
Loops is a latecomer to music, only picking up a guitar in his final years of college. After graduating from UCT in 2008 and unsure he wanted a career in finance, he would spend two years traveling the world while working on a superyacht. It was in this time he adopted a loop pedal to substitute other musicians as he had access to none while at sea. In 2010, upon returning from his travels and committed to pursuing a career in music, Loops also co-founded tree planting organisation Greenpop.

=== 2011–2013: Debut EP and live success ===
In October 2011, Loops released his self-titled debut EP. Though a now out-of-print limited release, many of the tracks from the EP were reworked and made an appearance on his debut album, Trading Change. He would spend 2011, 2012, and 2013 growing his profile in South Africa on the back of an acclaimed live show that would eventually earn him the Best Live Act Award at the 2014 MK Awards.

=== 2014–2018: Trading Change and international growth ===
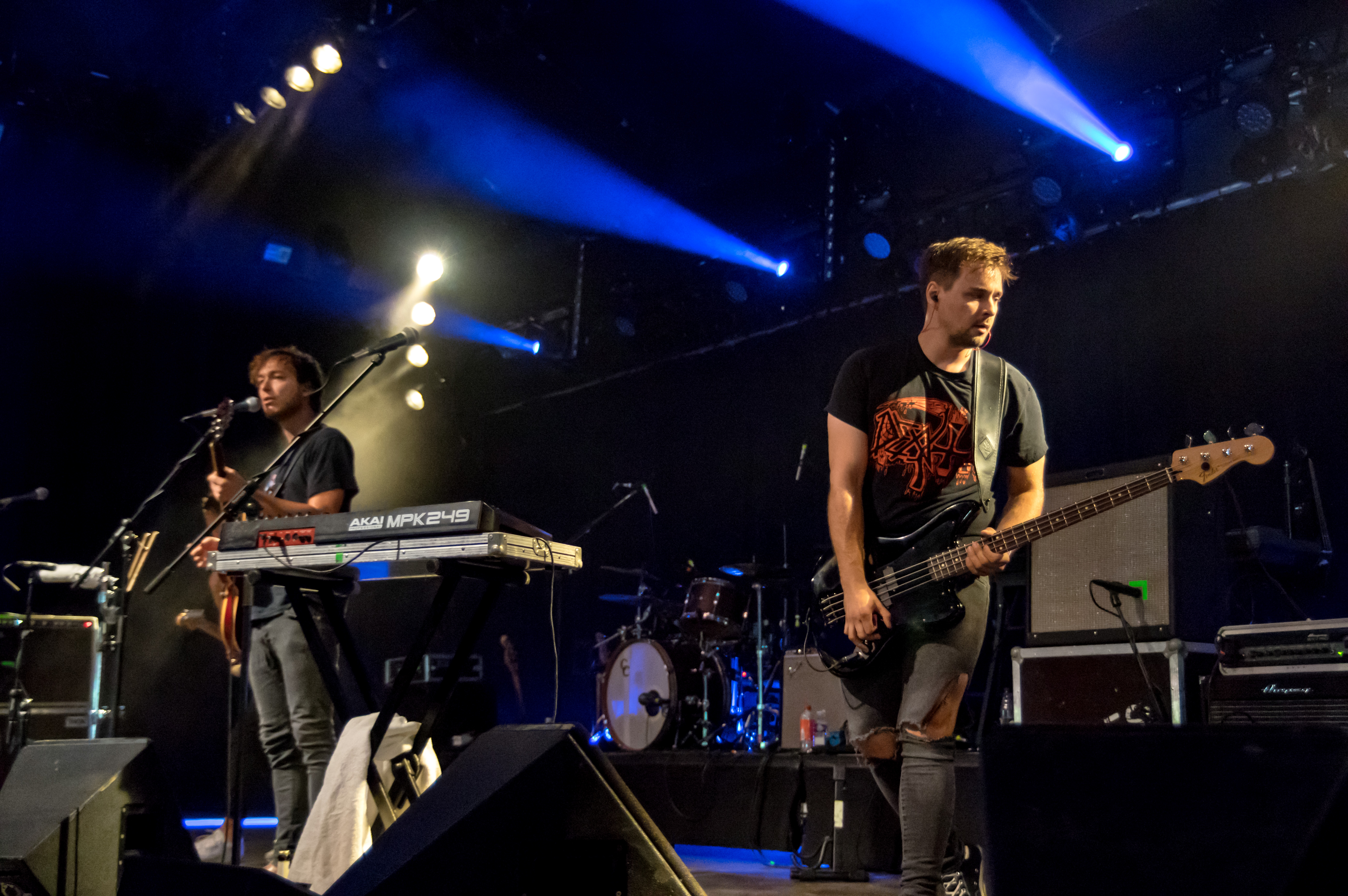
Hewitts' band on stage in 2017

In January 2014, he released "Down South" (featuring Motheo Moleko), the lead single from his debut album Trading Change. This song became an instant hit, peaking at number one on South African Top 40 radio stations 5fm, 94.7, and Jacaranda FM, the breakout song's popularity drew a lot of attention to his album. Upon release in South Africa in April 2014, Trading Change debuted at No. 1 on iTunes South Africa. In support of the album, Loops spent 2014 touring all over South Africa.

In the buildup to Trading Change's August 2015 North American release, Loops toured the United States three times. First securing a support slot on the Winter Greens Tour, headlined by reggae band Rebelution. This was followed up with two headline US tours of his own, namely the Jeremy Loops US Tour and the Trading Change Tour.

In Europe, Loops supported the popular American band Twenty One Pilots on their Blurryface Tour in September 2015, and followed that up with his own headlining tours, Continental Drift and the European leg of the Trading Change Tour. Trading Change was released in Europe on 26 February 2016.

In a 2018, Loops released the album Critical as Water. This album tackled the serious water shortage that the singer's home city, Cape Town, faced during that time.

=== 2019–present: Heard You Got Love ===
In April 2022, Loops released "Better Together" and its accompanying music video, ahead of his upcoming third studio album Heard You Got Love, which was released on July 8 of that same year.

== Discography ==
=== Studio albums ===
- Trading Change (2014)
- Critical as Water (2018)
- Heard You Got Love (2022)
- Feathers and Stone (2025)
