= Bridges and Powerlines =

Indie pop band from Brooklyn, New York

- Origin: Brooklyn, New York, United States
- Genres: Indie rock, indie-pop
- Years active: 2006–present
- Label: Daisy Pistol
- Members: David Boyd; Mason Ingram; Keith Sigel; Andrew Wood
- Past members: Jon Crockett; Peter Mucek

Bridges and Powerlines is a Brooklyn indie pop band. Their style is influenced by electronic and indie-rock. The band has cited indie forefathers the Zombies, Guided by Voices and the Elephant 6 Collective as influences, and has coined the phrase ‘optimist fuzz pop’ to describe their music. The band has stated that their common love is the pursuit of intricately arranged three-minute pop songs.

== Biography ==
The band formed in the summer of 2005 under the name Sunspots but underwent an early name-change for legal reasons. Original members included Andrew Wood, Keith Sigel, Peter Mucek and Jon Crockett. Their self-titled debut EP was released on their label CityBird records in September 2006 and received praise from a variety of sources, earning the tag "band to watch."

The success of their EP attracted producer Chris Zane, known for his work with Passion Pit, The Walkmen and White Rabbits, and the band spent much of 2007 writing and recording. The band released their debut LP Ghost Types in April 2008, drawing numerous favorable mentions from outlets such as Paste Magazine, PopMatters, Yahoo Music and Pitchfork.

These records were followed by numerous tours including annual appearances at South by Southwest and CMJ. Jon Crockett departed from the band in 2008 for personal reasons, and David Boyd joined as the new guitarist.

In 2011, they released their follow-up album, Eve, which the band stated was a representation of the culmination of their thoughts on life prior to September 11, 2001. With producer Kieran Kelley, best known for his work on the Sufjan Stevens record Illinois, the band spent three months in the studio creating the album. Critics praised their efforts, with Popmatters calling Eve “a big winner” and RSLblog proclaiming it “ridiculously addictive”

After Eve, Peter Mucek and the band parted ways on amicable terms, and Mason Ingram, who played percussion on the record, joined as the new drummer. Over the next two years the band's live shows continued to draw acclaim, with The New Yorker calling Bridges and Powerlines "an appealing indie quartet."

The band ventured into the studio in late 2012 to begin recording again. The new EP, titled Better, was once again produced by Kieran Kelly, features guest appearances by members of Bon Iver and was mixed by Adam Lasus, known for his work with Yo La Tengo and Clap Your Hands Say Yeah. The band has stated that the EP draws on the frenetic, often dissonant indie rock that has always inspired them and features a return to the nervous energy that defined their earliest releases. The EP was released in March 2013.

The band's most recent album, National Fantasy, was self-released and came out in October 2016.

== Discography ==
=== EPs ===
- Bridges and Powerlines (2006, CityBird Records)
- Better (2013, Daisy Pistol Records)

=== Studio albums ===
- Ghost Types (2008, CityBird Records)
- Eve (2011, Stunning Models on Display Records)
- National Fantasy (2016, Self-released)

=== Singles ===
- "Carmen" (2006, CityBird Records)
- "Uncalibrated" (2008, CityBird Records)
- "Middle Child" (2008, CityBird Records)
- "The Thieves, they are Everywhere" (2008, CityBird Records)
- "Mirabell" (2011, Stunning Models on Display)
- "I Remember a Blue Sky" (2011, Stunning Models on Display)
- "The Jameson" (2011, Stunning Models on Display)
