= VHS Collection =

American indie rock synth-pop band

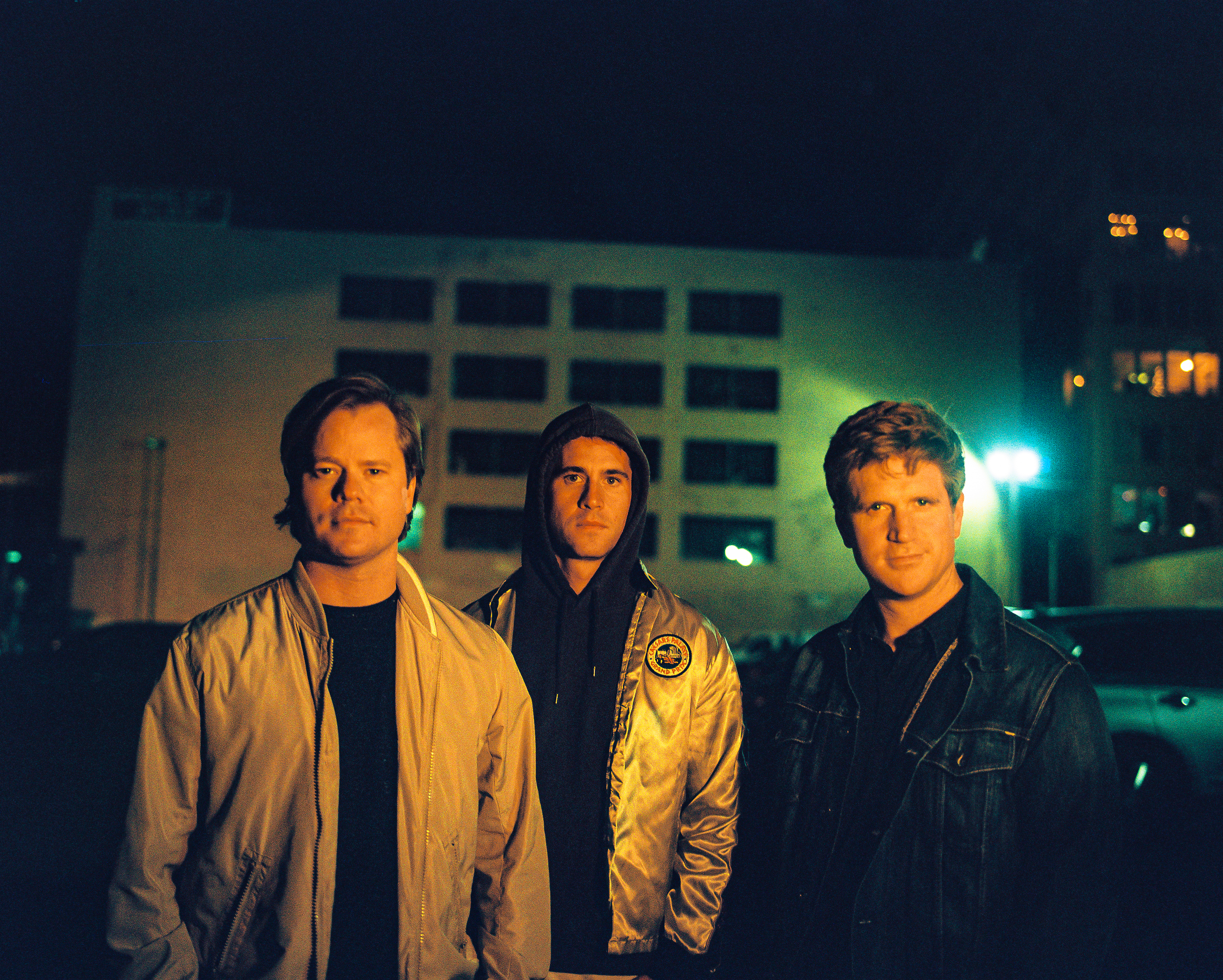
- VHS Collection: Nils Vanderlip, Conor Cook, James Bohannon

Background information
- Origin: New York City
- Genres: Indie rock; Alternative rock; Pop; Synth-pop
- Years active: 2015–present
- Labels: Independent, PIAS
- Members: James Bohannon; Nils Vanderlip; Conor Cook
- Website: vhscollection.com

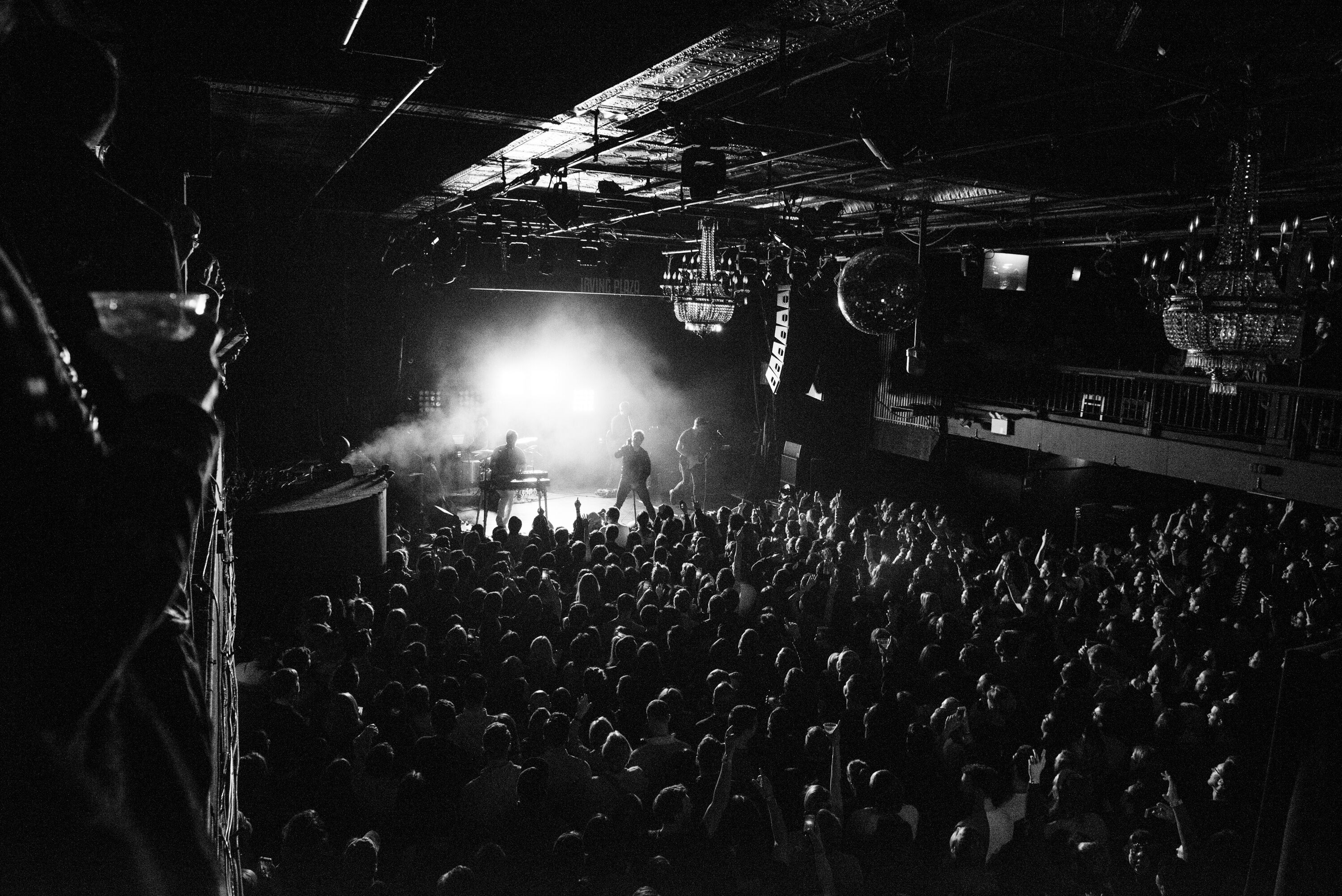
VHS Collection performing at Irving Plaza in March 2019

VHS Collection is an American Indie rock/Synth-pop band from New York City that was formed in 2015 by Conor Cook, James Bohannon, and Nils Vanderlip. The band, which has been independent since its inception, is represented by CAA and has released 12 singles, 2 EPs, and 2 full-length albums.

The band's music fuses modern and retro sonics, made use of synthesizers and guitars, and blended electronic and alt-rock aesthetics. They performed at major music festivals including Lollapalooza, Austin City Limits, Governors Ball Music Festival, Bunbury Music Festival, Okeechobee Music & Arts Festival, and Firefly Music Festival. Several of their songs have been featured in TV shows including Shameless, Sunday Night Football, The Perfect Date, Fifa World Cup, You, WWE Raw, and Love. Three VHS Collection singles have charted on the Spotify Viral Charts ("Lean", "Waiting on the Summer", and "Sign") and one single ("Survive") has charted on the Billboard Alternative Radio Charts.

== History ==
VHS Collection's three members have known each other since childhood. Conor Cook and James Bohannon attended the same middle school in New York City, while James and Nils Vanderlip attended the same high school.

VHS Collection began performing live at friends' parties and around NYC's Lower East Side rock clubs, eventually selling out multiple headline shows at the NYC's Mercury Lounge. In December 2015, the band independently released their self-titled debut EP. The EP's single "Lean" was reviewed favorably by Consequence of Sound and rose to #8 on the Spotify Viral Charts in January 2016. VHS Collection released their second EP Stereo Hype in 2016, which featured the singles Waiting on the Summer and Ghost. The band performed at Lollapalooza and Austin City Limits that year and opened for Bloc Party. VHS Collection released more singles in 2017, as they worked on material for their debut album with producers Chris Zane (who has worked with Passion Pit and St. Vincent) and Tony Hoffer (who has produced and mixed artists like M83, Beck, and Phoenix). On November 2, 2018, VHS released their debut album, Retrofuturism. The album has 12 songs and is reminiscent of 1980's music. In 2019, the band embarked on the Retrofuturism Tour, with 24 dates across the United States and Canada. In 2022, the band released its second full-length album, Night Drive, through PIAS. Survive from the album spent three weeks on the US Alternative Radio Charts. The band completed the Night Drive tour in July 2022 in the US, including a headline show at Brooklyn Steel.

The band released their second full-length album titled Night Drive on February 25, 2022.

== Members ==
- James Bohannon - Vocals (2015–present)
- Conor Cook - Guitar, synths, producer (2015–present)
- Nils Vanderlip - Synths, guitars, producer (2015–present)

== Discography ==
=== Albums ===
Title	Date
Retrofuturism	November 2, 2018
Night Drive	February 25, 2022

=== EPs ===
Title	Date
VHS Collection	December 14, 2015
Stereo Hype	September 30, 2016

=== Singles ===
Title	Date
"Lean"	November 2015
"Ghost"	June 2016
"The Longest Drive"	July 2016
"Waiting on the Summer"	September 2016
"Wide Awake"	February 3, 2017
"So I Met Someone"	May 25, 2017
"Fire"	August 9, 2017
"Sign"	November 20, 2017
"One"	April 18, 2018
"Animal"	June 13, 2018
"Dreaming"	February 8, 2019
"Searching for the Light"	October 14, 2020
"The Dark"	April 21, 2021
"The Deep End"	September 22, 2021
"The Space Between Us"	November 10, 2021
"Survive"	January 19, 2022
"Anyway"	February 22, 2022
