= Please Consider Our Time =

Studio album by Shy Child
- Released: 2002
- Genre: Electronica, experimental
- Length: 30:15
- Label: Grenadine Records

Shy Child chronology
Please Consider Our Time (2002)	One with the Sun (2004)

Please Consider Our Time is the debut album from New York City band Shy Child.

The album is more experimental in nature than the band's later releases. It was released only in Canada and Japan, and received very little promotion. No singles were released from the album.

== Release ==
The album was originally self-released, and was sold in 2001 as CD-Rs in a small record shop. A representative of Grenadine Records bought a copy, and later signed the band, releasing the album officially in 2002.

== Track listing ==
1. "Wedway" 5:06
2. "Mercury and Sun" 2:46
3. "Welcome To Sci-Tronix Datasystems!" 0:28
4. "TV Tunnel" 4:57
5. "Electro College" 4:55
6. "Brico Logic" 1:31
7. "Prosumer" 5:25
8. "Ontology Of The Ball" 2:18
9. "Great Expectations" 4:49

=== Japan Bonus Tracks ===
1. "TV Tunnel (Joseph Nothing Remix)"
2. "Great Expectations (Joseph Nothing Remix)"
