= Scavengers (album) =

Studio album by Calla
- Released: January 16, 2001
- Genre: Noise rock
- Length: 48:01
- Label: Sub Rosa; Young God

Calla chronology
Calla (1999)	Scavengers (2001)	Televise (2003)

Professional ratings
Review scores
Source	Rating
AllMusic	4.5/5 stars
Pitchfork	8.3/10

Scavengers is the second album from New York-based band Calla.

== Track listing ==
All tracks by Calla

1. "Fear of Fireflies" – 4:21
2. "Hover over Nowhere" – 7:22
3. "Traffic Sound" – 3:52
4. "Tijerina" – 6:12
5. "Slum Creeper" – 4:46
6. "The Swarm" – 5:22
7. "Mayzelle" – 3:13
8. "Love of Ivah" – 5:15
9. "A Fondness for Crawling" – 2:22
10. "Promenade" (Bono, U2) – 5:16

== Personnel ==
- Calla – Producer, Engineer, Art Direction
- Sean Donovan – Bass, Keyboards, Programming, Engineer
- Michael Gira – Producer, Art Direction
- Chris Griffin – Mastering
- Aurelio Valle – Guitar, Vocals
