= LP (Ambulance LTD album) =

Studio album by Ambulance LTD
- Released: March 23, 2004
- Recorded: 2002–2004
- Studios: Recording studios in London and New York City
- Genre: Indie rock
- Length: 51:44
- Language: English
- Label: TVT Records
- Producers: Ambulance LTD, Simon "Barny" Barnicott, Ron A. Shaeffer, Jim Abbiss, Chris Zane

Ambulance LTD chronology
Ambulance LTD (2003)	LP (2004)	New English EP (2006)

Singles from LP
- 1. "Heavy Lifting" Released: December 13, 2004; 2. "Stay Where You Are" Released: February 28, 2005; 3. "Primitive (The Way I Treat You)" Released: June 13, 2005

Professional ratings
Review scores
Source	Rating
Allmusic	link
Drowned in Sound	(7/10) link
Music Box	link
PopMatters	(8/10) link
Rolling Stone	5/13/04, p.73
Stylus Magazine	(C) link

LP is the first and only album by the New York-based indie rock band Ambulance LTD. The album was released on March 23, 2004, in the US and March 14, 2005, in the UK by TVT Records. The album went on to sell more than 100,000 copies worldwide.

LP was promoted with the release of the singles "Heavy Lifting", "Stay Where You Are", and "Primitive (The Way I Treat You)" throughout late 2004 and 2005. Following the album's release, Ambulance LTD would go on to release one more EP, New English in 2006, before dissolving after a lengthy legal battle with TVT Records.

== Track listing ==
All tracks are written by Marcus Congleton, except where noted.

No.	Title	Length
1.	"Yoga Means Union"	4:54
2.	"Primitive (The Way I Treat You)"	3:58
3.	"Anecdote"	3:16
4.	"Heavy Lifting"	3:32
5.	"Ophelia"	3:38
6.	"Stay Where You Are"	5:54
7.	"Sugar Pill"	4:39
8.	"Michigan"	4:30
9.	"Stay Tuned"	3:16
10.	"Swim"	4:22
11.	"Young Urban"	4:21

US bonus track
No.	Title	Writer(s)	Length
12.	"The Ocean"	Lou Reed	5:24

UK bonus track
No.	Title	Length
12.	"Straight A's"	4:24

== Credits ==
- Recorded and mixed in London and New York City.
- Tracks 1, 3, 5, 9, and 11 produced by Ambulance LTD and Simon "Barny" Barnicott. Mixed by Simon "Barny" Barnicott.
- Track 2 produced by Ron A. Shaeffer and Ambulance LTD for Orchard Productions. Additional production and mix by Jim Abbiss. Mix engineered by Barny.
- Tracks 4, 7, 8, and 10 produced by Jim Abbiss. Mix engineered by Simon "Barny" Barnicott.
- Track 6 produced by Chris Zane and Ambulance LTD. Additional production and mix by Jim Abbiss. Mix engineered by Simon "Barny" Barnicott.
- Mastered by Emily Lazar at the Lodge.
- A&R - Leonard B. Johnson
- Art direction by Benjamin Wheelock.
- Design concept by Marcus Congleton.
- Still photography by John Wilkes. Band photography by Roger Sargent.
