= Long Live Koko =

Long Live KOKO

EP by Pacific Air
- Released: 2012
- Genres: Indie rock, indie pop, synthpop
- Length: 14:07
- Label: Republic Records
- Producer: Chris Zane

Pacific Air chronology
Long Live KOKO (2012)	Stop Talking (2013)

Long Live KOKO is the debut EP by Pacific Air.

== Reception ==
The EP was positively received, with Sputnik Music writing that "although indie music is full of unoriginality and it sounds monotonous at times, Pacific Air have added their own unique sound to the scene. From the vocals to the instrumentation, this album is spot on". Lyrique Discorde also wrote very favorably about the EP, writing that "this EP feels like peace". Pitchfork wrote that "brothers Ryan and Taylor Lawhon's jangle of tambourines, whistles, and breathy harmonies rises to cruising altitude above the fray".

== Track listing ==
No.	Title	Length
1.	"Float"	3:20
2.	"Intermission"	2:39
3.	"Roses"	3:59
4.	"So Strange"	4:09
