= One with the Sun =

One With The Sun

Studio album by Shy Child
- Released: 5 October 2004
- Genre: Electronica, synthpop
- Label: Say Hey Records

Shy Child chronology
Please Consider Our Time (2002)	One With The Sun (2004)	Noise Won't Stop (2007)

One with the Sun is the second studio album by New York City electronica duo Shy Child. The album is centered on the sun, with many songs containing lyrical themes about summer and sunshine.

It is rated 4 out of 5 stars on AllMusic.

== Track listing ==
=== Standard Edition ===
1. "Noise Won't Stop"
2. "Sunshine"
3. "Summer"
4. "Break Your Neck"
5. "Technicrats"
6. "Echo And Throb"
7. "Institutions"
8. "One With The Sun"
9. "Take Me There"

Different mixes of tracks 1 and 3 are also on the band's third album, Noise Won't Stop.

=== Japanese Edition Bonus Tracks ===
1. "Summer (Com.A Winter Mix)"
2. "Technicrats (Milky-Chu Shy Na Chu Remix)"
