= The Swords Project EP =

EP by Swords
- Released: 2001
- Genre: Experimental rock
- Length: 26:49
- Label: Absolutely Kosher Records

Swords chronology
The Swords Project EP (2001)	Entertainment Is Over If You Want It (2003)

Professional ratings
Review scores
Source	Rating
Pitchfork	7.7/10 link

The Swords Project is the first release from the band The Swords Project (now simply named Swords).

== Track listing ==
1. Shannon's Wedding Song – 9:35
2. The New Assassin – 5:01
3. Squatting Level – 6:35
4. Case Study In Pathetics – 5:38
