= Home (American band) =

Experimental pop band

Home is an experimental pop band formed in Tampa, Florida in the early-1990s, before relocating to New York in 1996. The band released eight self-produced, sequentially numbered, ultra-low-distribution albums on cheap Radio Shack cassettes before signing to Sony's Relativity Records label, which distributed its ninth album (IX) in 1995. This album, Home's only release on a major label, received favorable reviews in publications such as Spin, The Village Voice and Magnet. Subsequent Home albums have appeared on independent record labels, also to generally positive reviews. Dave Fridmann of The Flaming Lips was the producer behind at least two of Home's albums.

Though Home was originally regarded as a lo-fi band due to its primitive recording techniques, its releases starting with IX have largely featured a cleaner sound highlighted by guitars and various electronic keyboards. In reviewing IX, The Village Voice observed that Home's sound resembles bands from "the late '80s (Sebadoh, Grifters) and mid-70s (Devo, Faust, David Bowie) sprinkled with enough influences out of the bargain-bins (Elton John, Gong, David Bowie) to push the taste-envelope a smidgen closer to both prog-art and schmaltz-rock." That album received a 7-out-of-10 rating from Spin. A year later, describing the band's independent album Elf: Gulf Bore Waltz, The Chicago Tribune wrote: "Laboring in the rock 'n' roll hinterland of Florida, the band Home has developed a refreshingly scattershot sound that wanders erratically through folky balladry, prog rock, ragged pop, and unclassifiable experimentation. Though somewhat reminiscent of indie rock obscurantists like Pavement, Home is both more ambitious and more consistently tuneful than many of its trendier peers."

The Trouser Press Record Guide opined less charitably: "When intently focused, Home can squeeze an agreeably synthetic, Devo-esque poptone (like 'Make It Right') from its gizmos. More often, though, Home lapses into wildly freeform freakouts (like 'Atomique') that combine electronic noise, found sound and even a bit of spoken word. ... Those endowed with short attention spans will no doubt have the easiest time making it all the way through IX."

The members of Home also helped found the Screw Music Forever record label and music collective. Besides releasing Home's 7-inch singles, Screw Music also has released recordings by related bands such as Dumbwaiters, Pee Shy (featuring drummer Bil Bowman), Leels and the 100% Storms Ensemble.

Home's 16th album, Sexteen, which the band describes as "a concept record about fucking," was released in 2006. This album also marked the end of the band's longstanding relationship with its European label, Cooking Vinyl. During the same year, members of Home performed under the name Home Hunters during the Come The Freak On music festival at Bombshell Gallery in St. Petersburg, Florida.

Home appeared on This Is Next Year: A Brooklyn-Based Compilation - Arena Rock Recording Co. - 2001

In 2010, Home released Seventeen on Oneida (band)'s Brah Records. The album primarily consisted of songs recorded by individual members. It was the last release to feature Sean Martin, a founding member of the group, who died in 2017.

18 and 18 Deuxième Partie production began in 2016. Tim Kearley (guitar, vocals) and Burke Sampson (guitar) joined for these recordings. Tim, founder of Screw Music Forever, contributed songs to the sessions. 18 was released on December 31, 2019. 18 was their first release in nearly 10 years. 18 Deuxième Partie was released in 2020.

During the COVID-19 pandemic, the band began exchanging tracks with one directive - no pop songs or vocals allowed. The result is CVDXIX, an expansive, melodic and experimental collection of songs.

In 2023, work began on their 20th collection of music.

== Members ==
Current:

- Andrew Deutsch - Guitar, vocals
- Tim Kearley - Guitar, vocals
- Chris Millstein - Drums, vocals
- Eric Morrison - Piano, vocals, guitar
- Burke Sampson - Guitar
- Brad Truax - Bass, vocals

Previous:

- Greg Anderson - Drums
- Bil Bowman - Drums
- Sean Martin - Drums, vocals, guitar
- Catherine Oberg - Drums, vocals
- Brian Repetto - Vocals
- Charles Stephens - Drums
- Chris Sturgeon - Drums
- Barry London - Guitar, vocals, synth

== Discography ==
- I self-released cassette, 1992
- II self-released cassette
- III self-released cassette
- IV self-released cassette
- V self-released cassette
- VI self-released cassette
- VII self-released cassette
- VIII self-released 8-track cassette
- IX compact disc (Relativity Records), 1995
- X compact disc (Emperor Jones), 1996
- Elf: Gulf Bore Waltz compact disc (Jetset), 1996
- XII Internet-only release at Screw Music Forever, 2005
- 13:Netherregions compact disc (Jetset), 1997
- XIV compact disc (Arena Rock Recording Co.), 1999
- XV compact disc (Cooking Vinyl), 2003
- Sexteen compact disc (Brah Records), 2006
- Seventeen vinyl (Brah Records), 2006
- 18 digital (Screw Music Forever), vinyl (Almost Halloween Time), 2019
- 18 Deuxième Partie digital (Screw Music Forever), 2020
- CVDXIX digital (Screw Music Forever), 2021
