= Summer (Shy Child song) =

- CD and 7" Cover

Single by Shy Child

from the album Noise Won't Stop
- B-side: "Murder Capital"
- Released: 3 September 2007
- Genre: Synthpop
- Label: Wall of Sound

Shy Child singles chronology
"Noise Won't Stop" (2007)	"Summer" (2007)	"Disconnected" (2010)

12" Cover

Summer is a 2007 single by New York City synthpop band Shy Child.

== Track listing ==
=== CD ===
1. 'Summer (Clean Radio Edit)'
2. 'Murder Capital'
3. 'Summer (South Central Remix)'
4. 'Summer (Mark One Remix)'
5. 'Summer (Seiji Remix)'
6. 'Summer (Infadels Remix)'
7. 'Summer (Album Version)'
8. 'Summer (Radio Edit)'

=== 7" ===
- A 'Summer'
- B 'Murder Capital'

=== 12" ===
- A1 'Summer (South Central's Summer Revolution Mix)'
- A2 'Summer (Seiji Remix)'
- B1 'Summer (Infadels Remix)'
- B2 'Noise Won't Stop (Buraka Som Sistema Remix)'

== Chart positions ==
Chart (2007)	Position
UK Indie (OCC)	22
