= Yebo Music =

Artist management and music company

Yebo Music is an artist management and music company based in New York City. It manages artists Jeremy Loops, Chrome Sparks, Miniature Tigers, Jack and Eliza, Mexican Institute of Sound, among others. The CEO is Colin Finkelstein, former COO of EMI Music North America.
