= Swords (band) =

American indie rock band

- Origin: Portland, Oregon, U.S.
- Genres: Indie rock
- Years active: 1999–2006
- Labels: Arena Rock; Absolutely Kosher
- Members: Joey Ficken; Corey Ficken; Liza Rietz; Ryan Stowe; Evan Railton; Jeff Gardner
- Past members: Amy Annelle; Sierra Collum; Brooke Crouser

Swords was an American indie rock band that formed in 1999 in Portland, Oregon. The band took their name from the idea of being "hired assassins of rock". The name of the band was shortened to Swords from The Swords Project in 2003. In May 2006, the band announced they would be breaking up, but would most likely continue working together in various other music projects. They never did.

== Discography ==
=== As Swords ===
- Metropolis (2005)

=== As The Swords Project ===
- The Swords Project EP (2001)
- Entertainment Is Over If You Want It (2003)

== Members ==
- Joey Ficken (drums)/(Gum Chewer)
- Corey Ficken (Bass guitar/vocals)
- Liza Rietz (Violin/accordion/melodica/keyboards)
- Ryan Stowe (Baritone guitar)
- Evan Railton (Electronics/drums/keyboards)
- Jeff Gardner (Guitar)
- Amy Annelle (Guitar)
- Sierra Collum (Violin & Viola)
- Brooke Crouser (keyboards & Melodica)

== Contemporaries ==
Tarentel
The Six Parts Seven
Priestess
