= Asobi Seksu =

American shoegaze/dream pop band

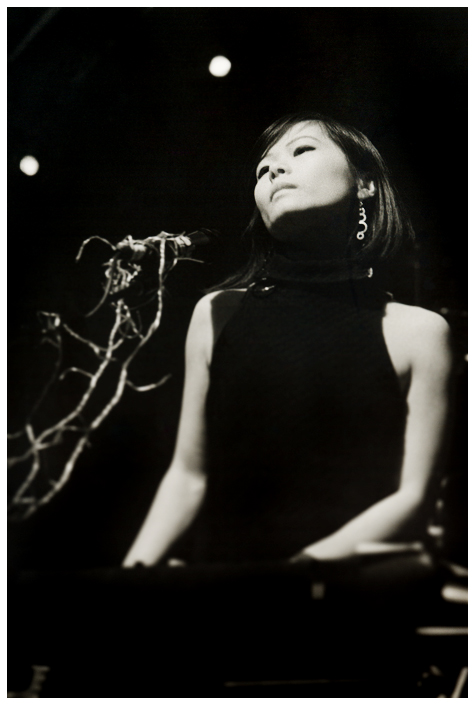
- Yuki Chikudate with Asobi Seksu onstage, 2006

Background information
- Also known as: Sportfuck
- Origin: New York City, New York, United States
- Genres: Shoegaze, dream pop, noise pop, indie pop, indie rock
- Years active: 2001–2013
- Labels: Friendly Fire Recordings, One Little Indian Records, Gigantic Music, Polyvinyl Record Co.
- Formerly of: Three Cornered Season; Theta Wave State; Orange 9mm Glassjaw; Head Automatica
- Spinoffs: Youth Worship
- Past members: Yuki Chikudate; James Hanna; Glenn Waldman; Keith Hopkin; Haji; Bryan Greene; Billy Pavone; Mitch Spivak; Ben Shapiro; Gunnar Olsen; Larry Gorman
- Website: asobiseksutime.tumblr.com/

Asobi Seksu was an American shoegaze/dream pop band based in New York City. Their music used a textured and effects-heavy vocal and guitar sound. The band primarily consisted of Yuki Chikudate (vocals, keyboards) and James Hanna (guitar, vocals).

== History ==
Forming in 2001, the band was originally known as Sportfuck, and issued an EP under that name that year. The band then changed their name to Asobi Seksu, from the Japanese 遊びセックス (asobi sekkusu), "play sex". The original lineup consisted of Chikudate, Hanna, drummer Keith Hopkin and bassist Glenn Waldman. Hanna and Hopkin, with bassist Haji, had previously been members of the New York City space rock trios Three Cornered Season and Theta Wave State.

Asobi Seksu's full-length self-titled debut album was self-released in 2002, and later re-released on the Friendly Fire Recordings label on May 18, 2004. Hopkin and Waldman left after touring for the album.

Regrouping with a new rhythm section of Haji (bass) and Bryan Greene (drums), they recorded their second album, Citrus, in New York City's Gigantic Studios with producer Chris Zane. It was released on May 30, 2006 by Friendly Fire Recordings.

By the time the band recorded their first live album, Spaceland Presents: At the Echo October 6th, 2006, Greene had been replaced by Mitch Spivak. The album was issued on October 31, 2006 by Spaceland Recordings. and reissued in 2007 by KUFALA Recordings.

One Little Indian Records signed the band in Europe and re-released the band's first two albums in 2007, with Citrus reaching No. 21 on the UK Indie Chart that year.

On November 20, 2007, Asobi Seksu released "Stay Awake" as a stand-alone single on the Gigantic Music label, backed by a cover of "Then He Kissed Me" by the Crystals. Another cover, of the Ramones' "Merry Christmas (I Don't Want to Fight Tonight)", was released by One Little Indian as a single on December 10, 2007.

Following the departures of Haji and Spivak, Chikudate and Hanna remained as Asobi Seksu's core, with the live band including drummer Ben Shapiro (later of Scary Mansion) and bassist Billy Pavone.

The band released another live album, Acoustic at Olympic Studios, on February 8, 2009 as a tour-exclusive CD. Recorded as a duo in November 2008, it featured new acoustic versions of the band's back catalog as well as unique tracks. Retitled as Rewolf, it was released worldwide in November 2009.

On February 17, 2009, the band (Chikudate and Hanna, joined by drummer Gunnar Olsen) released their third studio album, Hush on the Polyvinyl Record Co. label. The album was released to generally positive reviews, with many critics citing a shift in the band's shoegaze direction to a mellower dream pop sound.

Drummer Larry Gorman, formerly of Orange 9mm, Glassjaw and Head Automatica, joined Asobi Seksu in 2009.

The band's fourth studio album, Fluorescence, was released on February 14, 2011. The lineup included Chikudate, Hanna, Gorman and Pavone.

On November 23, 2012, for Record Store Black Friday, the band released Asobi Seksu x Boris, a split EP with Boris on which Asobi Seksu covered that band's "Farewell".

The band announced an indefinite hiatus on September 30, 2013, via their Facebook page.

On July 23, 2014, Asobi Seksu announced that they would reunite for a one-off show opening for Slowdive in Boston on October 26, 2014, at Slowdive's request.

== Other projects ==
In May 2009, Chikudate released a collaborative single with Pocket called "Sampo". The track included remixes by Mux Mool, Blue Eyes and Craig Wedren.

In 2014, Hanna and Gorman formed the band Youth Worship, releasing an EP in 2014 and a full-length album in 2015.

== Song appearances in media ==
Asobi Seksu's songs have been featured in various television shows, including The L Word and the British television series Skins. The song "Layers" from Hush was also featured in an episode of Ugly Betty. Furthermore, "Thursday" was featured in the eight episode of the second season of the legal-drama Suits at minute 11:45. Their non-album track "Stay Awake" was included on the Adult Swim compilation album Warm & Scratchy in May 2007. Their song "Ramen Girl" was the closing credits song for the 2008 film The Ramen Girl.

The band provided music for So Yong Kim's 2007 film In Between Days and contributed an original score for Kim's 2009 film Treeless Mountain. The song "Thursday" was featured in The Exploding Girl, produced and edited by Kim and directed by her husband Bradley Rust Gray. Kim also directed the music video for the song. "Thursday" was also used in LateRooms' 2012 advertisement and in the trailer for the 2014 film Affluenza.

== Former members ==
- Yuki Chikudate - lead vocals, keyboards (2001-2013)
- James Hanna - guitar, vocals (2001-2013)
- Glenn Waldman - bass (2001-2005)
- Keith Hopkin - drums (2001-2005)
- Haji - bass (2005-2007)
- Bryan Greene - drums (2005-2006)
- Mitch Spivak - drums (2006)
- Billy Pavone - bass (2007-2013)
- Ben Shapiro - drums (2007)
- Gunnar Olsen - drums (2009)
- Larry Gorman - drums, sampling (2009-2013)

== Discography ==
=== Studio albums ===
- Asobi Seksu (2002, self-released; 2004, Friendly Fire Recordings)
- Citrus (2006, Friendly Fire Recordings/One Little Indian Records) (No. 21 UK Indie Chart in 2007)
- Hush (2009, Polyvinyl Record Co./One Little Indian Records)
- Fluorescence (2011, Polyvinyl Record Co.)

=== Singles and EPs ===
- "Goodbye" (2006, One Little Indian Records)
- "Walk on the Moon" (2007, One Little Indian Records)
- "Strawberries" (2007, One Little Indian Records)
- "Thursday" (2007, One Little Indian Records)
- "Stay Awake" (2007, Gigantic Music)
- "Merry Christmas (I Don't Want to Fight Tonight)" (Ramones cover) (2007, One Little Indian Records)
- "Me & Mary" (2008, Polyvinyl Record Co./One Little Indian Records)
- "Goodbye" (remix) (2008, One Little Indian Records)
- "Familiar Light" (2009, One Little Indian Records)
- "Transparence" (2009, Polyvinyl Record Co.)
- "Layers" (2009, One Little Indian Records
- Perfectly Crystal EP (2011, self-released)
- Asobi Seksu x Boris split EP with Boris (2012, Polyvinyl Record Co.)

=== Live albums ===
- Spaceland Presents: At the Echo October 6th, 2006 (2006, Spaceland Recordings)
- iTunes Live from SoHo (2007, iTunes)
- Acoustic at Olympic Studios (2009, One Little Indian Records)
- Rewolf (2009, Polyvinyl Record Co.)

=== Selected compilation appearances ===
- "All Through the Day" (Jerome Kern/Oscar Hammerstein II cover) on The Patty Duke Fanzine #6: Love to Patty (2006, Top Quality Rock & Roll)
- "Bob Dylan's 115th Dream" (Bob Dylan cover) on Subterranean Homesick Blues: A Tribute to Bob Dylan's Bringing It All Back Home (2010, Reimagine Music)
- "Vicious Bears" on Japan 3.11.11: A Benefit Album (2011, Polyvinyl Record Co.)
- "Little House of Savages" (The Walkmen cover) on Cover Compilation (2011, RCRD LBL)

=== as Sportfuck ===
- Sportfuck EP (2001, self-released)
