= Mink Lungs =

American band

The Mink Lungs were a Brooklyn-area band begun in 1993.

Jennifer Hoopes and Gian Carlo Feleppa met while working at a diner in the Hamptons. Both adoring music and influenced by Michael Siegel and Gert Wilden, the pair began composing and writing music with Gian's half-brother Tim Feleppa. Gian had also studied guitar and composition at the Berklee College of Music. Drummer Tom Galbraith relocated from San Francisco to New York and the band started recording on a four-track recorder, each contributing to the songwriting process. In April 1999, the Mink Lungs performed its first show in New York but were soon performing in famous venues such as Brownies and the Mercury Lounge. Opening slots for Luna and Delta 72 soon followed. Prior to gaining recognition for their dynamic live performances, Mink Lungs were signed to the Arena Rock Recording Co., appearing on the label's This Is Next Year: A Brooklyn-Based Compilation. In 2002, the band released its debut album The Better Button. Often switching vocals and instruments, the group has performed across the United States, including the South By Southwest Festival. Tim Feleppa contributed music to the independent film Sore Losers. Gian Feleppa and Jennifer Hoopes went on to form Emergency Party.
