= Ambulance LTD (EP) =

EP by Ambulance LTD
- Released: June 17, 2003
- Recorded: 2002–2003
- Genre: Indie rock
- Length: 22:11
- Label: TVT Records
- Producer: Ambulance LTD

Ambulance LTD chronology
| Ambulance LTD (2003) | LP (2004) |

Professional ratings
Review scores
| Source | Rating |
|---|---|
| Allmusic | 3/5 stars |
| Pitchfork Media | (6.4/10) |
| PopMatters | (mediocre) |
| Prefix Magazine | 3/5 stars |

Ambulance LTD is the self-titled debut EP by American indie rock group Ambulance LTD, released in 2003. The EP features the original versions of "Primitive (The Way I Treat You)," "Heavy Lifting," "Young Urban" and "Stay Where You Are," which would be re-recorded for the band's debut album LP.

== Track listing ==
1. "Stay Where You Are" – 3:53
2. "Primitive (The Way I Treat You)" – 4:04
3. "Heavy Lifting" – 3:56
4. "Helmsman" – 5:00
5. "Young Urban" / "Stay Where You Are" (Outro) (hidden track) – 5:18

== Singles ==
- "Primitive (The Way I Treat You)" (September 22, 2003)

== Credits ==
- All tracks composed by Marcus Congleton.
- Track 1 produced and mixed by Chris Zane at Gigantic Studios.
- Tracks 2 and 5 produced and mixed by Ron A. Shaeffer for Orchard Productions.
- Tracks 3 and 4 produced by Ambulance LTD, Aaron Nevezie, and John Davis at the Abattoir. Mixed by Chris Zane and Marcus Congleton.
- Mastered by Carl Rowatti at Tru Tone Mastering.
- Design by Benjamin Wheelock.
- A&R - Leonard B. Johnson
