= The Hundred in the Hands =

American electronic music duo

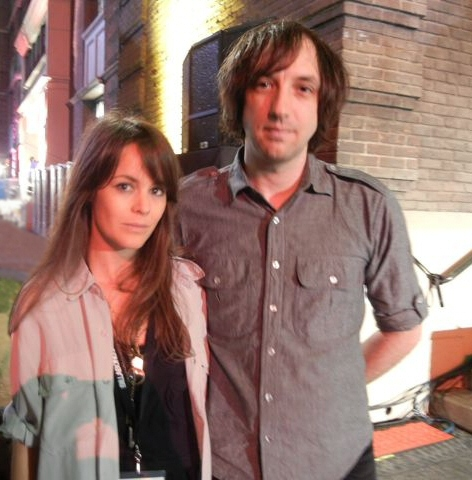
- The Hundred in the Hands in June 2011

Background information
- Origin: Brooklyn, New York, U.S.
- Genres: Electropop; synth-pop; dream pop; dance-rock; disco-punk
- Years active: 2008–present
- Labels: Warp; New Ancestors
- Members: Eleanore Everdell; Jason Friedman
- Website: thehundredinthehands.com

The Hundred in the Hands (sometimes abbreviated as THITH) is an American electronic music duo from Brooklyn, New York City, formed in 2008. The band consists of Eleanore Everdell (vocals, keyboards) and Jason Friedman (guitar, programming). The band blends synth-pop with post-punk and dream pop elements.

== History ==
In 2007, singer Holly Miranda introduced Everdell to Friedman. Everdell joined The Boggs as a touring member. The two decided to form a band after they discovered that they shared similar music taste for early hip hop, French house, disco, ska, dub, post-punk and other genres.

The band was named after the phrase the Lakota Nation gave to the 1866 Fetterman Fight in Wyoming, in which Crazy Horse led his warriors to a victory that resulted in the death of 100 enemies.

They recorded the song "Dressed in Dresden" in Brooklyn, which was released online in December 2008. In March 2009 the band released the single "Dressed in Dresden"/"Undressed in Dresden" on the Pure Groove label. The success of this song led to a deal with Warp Records in August 2009, which Friedman calls "near the top of my list of ideal labels". Warp issued the 12" single "Dressed in Dresden" on April 5, 2009.

The duo's six-track debut EP This Desert was released on May 18, 2010, followed by the singles "Pigeons" on September 13, 2010, and "Commotion"/"Aggravation" on November 15, 2010. Their debut album The Hundred in the Hands was released on September 20, 2010, by Warp Records. The album received generally favorable reviews, with a Metacritic score of 74, based on 13 reviews. The song "Pigeons" was featured in the third episode of the fifth season of Gossip Girl, "The Jewel of Denial", originally aired October 10, 2011.

In January 2011, The Hundred in the Hands was nominated in the Pop/Rock category at The 10th Annual Independent Music Awards for their self-titled album, while their music video for "Pigeons" was nominated in the Music Video, Short Form category.

The duo's second studio album, Red Night, was released on June 11, 2012.

Their third album Love in the Black Stack was released on June 15, 2017, by New Ancestors.

== Other projects ==
- The duo runs their own online magazine, THITH ZINE, where they "write about, and talk with, bands, artists and designers we like".
- Everdell sang on "Lover's Day" from TV on the Radio's 2008 album Dear Science.
- Friedman has a co-writing credit with former Led Zeppelin frontman Robert Plant for the song "Central Two O Nine" off of Plant's 2010 "Band Of Joy Album"

== Touring ==
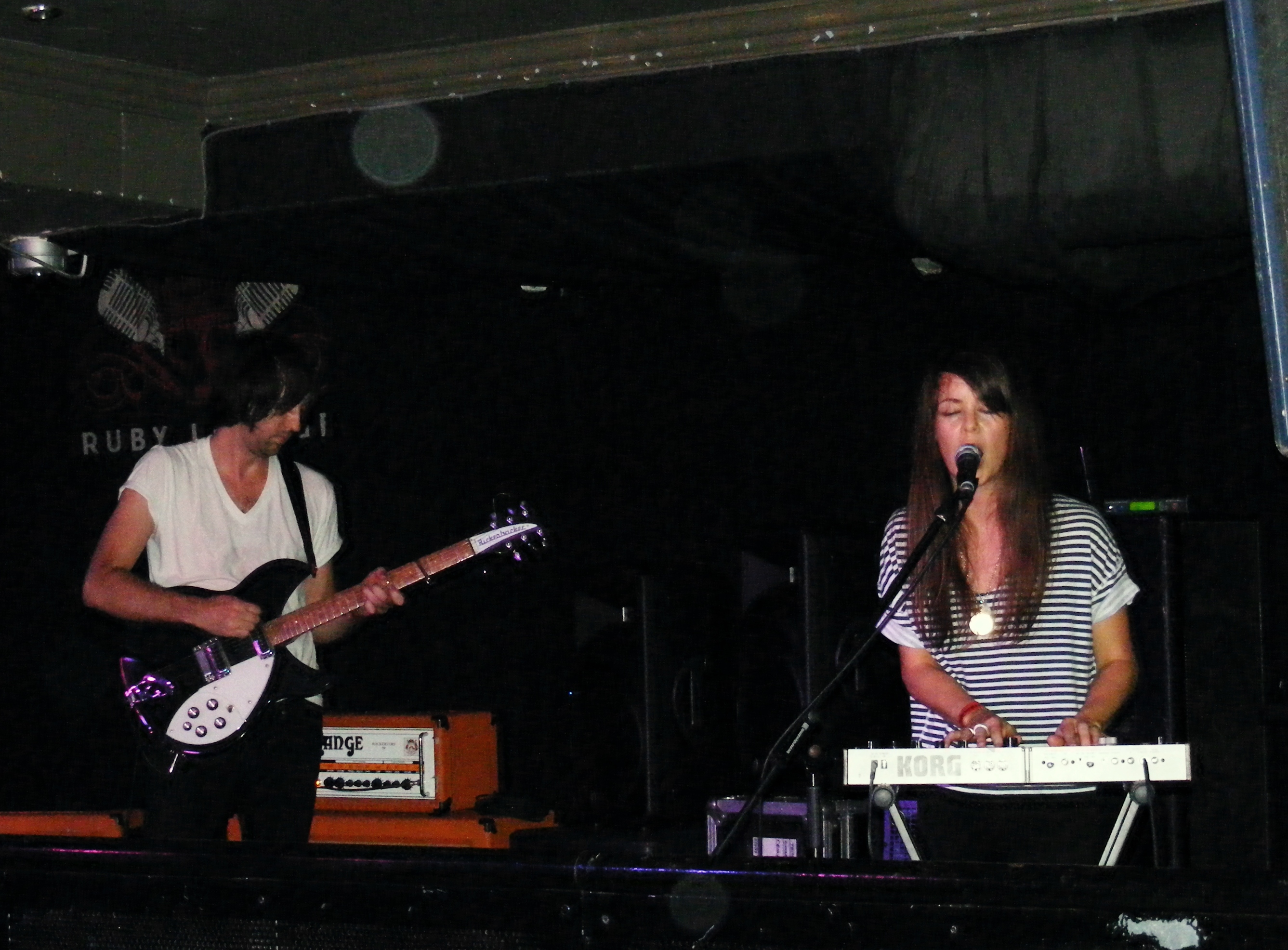
The Hundred in the Hands performing in Manchester, July 8, 2010

In the group's live performances, Friedman uses a Rickenbacker 330 guitar and Everdell uses a microKORG. They have toured in the US and Europe and performed live at several music festivals, including La Route du Rock, the Wireless Festival, the Melt! Festival, the Dockville, the Appletree Garden Festival and the Bootboohook Festival.

== Discography ==
=== Albums ===
- The Hundred in the Hands (2010)
- Red Night (2012)
- Love in the Black Stack (2017)

=== Extended plays ===
- This Desert (2010)

=== Singles ===
- "Dressed in Dresden" (2008)
- "Dressed in Dresden"/"Undressed in Dresden" (2009)
- "Pigeons" (2010)
- "Commotion"/"Aggravation" (2010)
- "Keep It Low" (2012)

=== Music videos ===
- "Tom Tom" (directed by Ben Crook)
- "Pigeons" (directed by Daniels)
- "Commotion" (directed by Daniels)
