= Asobi Seksu (album) =

- 2004 Friendly Fire reissue

Studio album by Asobi Seksu
- Released: 2002
- Studio: 80-20 (Queens, New York)
- Genre: Shoegaze; dream pop
- Length: 39:22

Asobi Seksu chronology
Asobi Seksu (2002)	Citrus (2006)

Singles from Asobi Seksu
- 1. "Walk on the Moon" Released: May 14, 2007

Professional ratings
Review scores
Source	Rating
AllMusic	3.5/5 stars
Pitchfork	6.0/10
The Skinny	4/5 stars
Stylus Magazine	B
Tiny Mix Tapes	3/5

Asobi Seksu is the debut studio album by American shoegaze band Asobi Seksu. It was self-released by the band in 2002. The album was reissued on May 18, 2004 in the United States by Friendly Fire Recordings and on June 4, 2007 in the United Kingdom by One Little Indian Records.

== Track listing ==
All tracks are written by Yuki Chikudate, James Hanna and Keith Hopkin, except where noted.

No.	Title	Length
1.	"I'm Happy but You Don't Like Me"	3:08
2.	"Sooner"	3:45
3.	"Umi de no Jisatsu"	2:23
4.	"Walk on the Moon"	4:33
5.	"Let Them Wait"	2:47
6.	"Taiyo"	2:01
7.	"It's Too Late"	7:17
8.	"End at the Beginning"	4:20
9.	"Asobi Masho"	1:25
10.	"Stay"	5:02
11.	"Before We Fall"	2:41
Total length:		39:22

UK edition bonus track
No.	Title	Writer(s)	Length
12.	"Nefi + Girly" (live)	Chikudate; Hanna	4:46
Total length:			44:08

UK edition bonus enhanced content
No.	Title	Length
1.	"Walk on the Moon" (video)	3:45

== Personnel ==
Credits are adapted from the liner notes of the 2002 and 2004 issues of the album.

Asobi Seksu

- Yuki Chikudate – keyboards, vocals
- James Hanna – guitar, vocals
- Keith Hopkin – drums
- Glenn Waldman – bass

Production

- Matt Anuskiewicz – assistance (production)
- Will Quinnell – engineering, mastering, mixing, recording
- Brian Ward – recording (bass tracks)

Design

- Asobi Seksu – cover design and layout (2002 issue)
- Annie Chiu – styling and assistance (2004 issue)
- Jim Donnelly – inside photography (2002 issue)
- Noah Kalina – cover photography (2002 issue)
- Sean McCabe – design and photography (2004 issue)
