= Collisions (album) =

Studio album by Calla
- Released: September 27, 2005
- Genre: Indie rock
- Length: 41:26
- Label: Beggars Banquet Records

Calla chronology
Televise (2003)	Collisions (2005)	Strength in Numbers (2007)

Professional ratings
Review scores
Source	Rating
AllMusic	4/5 stars

Collisions is the fourth album from New York-based Calla.

== Track listing ==
1. "It Dawned on Me" – 3:13
2. "Initiate" – 3:30
3. "This Better Go as Planned" – 3:58
4. "Play Dead" – 3:33
5. "Pulvarized" – 4:58
6. "So Far, So What" – 4:21
7. "Stumble" – 3:52
8. "Imbusteros" – 1:23
9. "Testify" – 3:45
10. "Swagger" – 3:38
11. "Overshadowed" – 5:11
