= Ambulance LTD =

American rock group

- Origin: Spanish Harlem, New York
- Genres: Indie rock
- Years active: 2000–2006 2008 - ?
- Labels: TVT, Island
- Spinoffs: The Red Romance, Stranger Islands
- Past members: Marcus Congleton; Andrew Haskell; Benji Lysaght; Matthew Dublin; Darren Beckett

Ambulance LTD was an indie rock group formed in Spanish Harlem, New York City in 2000. The band was founded by Michael Di Liberto and David Longstreth from Cleveland OH. Marcus Congleton joined about a year later and continued on with their name and ideas with other members. They signed to TVT Records after getting positive reviews from their live shows and released their debut album LP on March 23, 2004 in the US and March 14, 2005 in the UK and went on to sell more than 100,000 copies worldwide.

The band mixes the genres of dream pop, indie rock and the British shoegazing movement of the late 1980s and early 1990s. Their influences range from the Beatles and the Rolling Stones to Spiritualized, My Bloody Valentine, and Elliott Smith. The band has said that "their niche is not sticking to any particular niche" and that they do not want to be stuck in any subgenre of rock.

An EP titled New English EP was released in March 2006.

After the defection of keyboardist Andrew Haskell shortly before their debut LP was released on TVT/Island, Matthew Dublin and Darren Beckett also left Ambulance LTD to form a band called The Red Romance with the addition of Adam Chilenski on bass, leaving Congleton as the only remaining member. Lysaght and Beckett went on to tour with such renowned stars as Father John Misty and Brandon Flowers. Lysaght is credited with guitar credit on 8 of the 10 songs on Flowers 2015 album "Desired Effect" and writing credit on one. Dublin then went on to form Stranger Islands with Canadian actress Joanie Wolkoff. Congleton legally acquired ownership of the band name Ambulance LTD, and in 2007, Congleton was working with The Velvet Underground's John Cale in Los Angeles writing new material, none of which has officially surfaced.

In 2008, Ambulance LTD hired a backing band consisting of Ian Fenger on guitar, Xander McMahon on keyboards, and Jeremy Kay on bass. They went on tour with their first performance at Middle East Downstairs in Cambridge, Massachusetts on April 2, 2008. Ambulance LTD were prevented from releasing new material after TVT Records filed for Chapter 11 bankruptcy. TVT also attempted to sell artists' back catalog, resulting in Congleton, along with labelmates The Polyphonic Spree, to file a lawsuit against the label and its parent company Universal Music Group in June 2008.

Marcus Congleton has a new band, Common Law and released their debut EP called EP in Nov 2025.

Michael Di Liberto writes and records under the name “prehd” and released a new album called “Cache” in April 2023 on all streaming services.

Andrew Haskell, now based in his hometown of Washington D.C., continues to write, record, and perform under the name Haskl. He released an EP in February 2022 called "The Difficult Year" on Kind Warrior.

Congleton also played with Pearl Charles.

Ambulance LTD reunited for shows on February 7 and 8, 2019 at New York's Mercury Lounge as part of the venue's 25th anniversary.

== Band members ==
Current

- Marcus Congleton – vocals, guitar, songwriter

Former

- Michael Di Liberto – founder, guitar, bass, vocals
- Dave Longstreth - guitar, backing vocals
- Matthew Dublin – bass, backing vocals
- Darren Beckett – drums
- Andrew Haskell – keyboards, backing vocals
- Benji Lysaght – guitar

== Discography ==
=== Studio albums ===
List of studio albums, with selected chart positions
Title	Album details	Peak chart positions	
Title	Album details	SCO	UK Indie
LP	Released: March 23, 2004; Label: TVT Records; Formats: LP, CD, digital download	88	13

=== EPs ===
Title	EP details
Ambulance LTD	Released: June 17, 2003; Label: TVT Records; Formats: CD, digital download
New English EP	Released: March 14, 2006; Label: TVT Records; Formats: CD, digital download

=== Singles ===
Title	Year	Peak chart positions					Album
Title	Year	US Alt	UK	UK Indie	UK Rock	SCO	Album
"Heavy Lifting"	2004	—	—	—	—	—	LP
"Stay Where You Are"	2005	—	67	13	—	79	LP
"Primitive (The Way I Treat You)"	2005	46	72	10	20	67	LP
"—" denotes releases that did not chart.

=== Music videos ===
Year	Video	Director	Link
2004	"Primitive (The Way I Treat You)"	Wendy Morgan	YouTube
2004	"Heavy Lifting"	Shannon Hartman	YouTube
2005	"Stay Where You Are"	Moh Azima	YouTube

== Song appearances in film and television ==
In 2004, their song "Stay Tuned" was used in the opening credits of the film P.S. In 2008, their song "Heavy Lifting" was featured in a scene of the film Forgetting Sarah Marshall. In 2010, their song "Sugar Pill" was featured in a scene of the film Takers. The introduction to "Stay Where You Are" was used in the season 2 episode of Grey's Anatomy, "As We Know It".
