= New English (EP) =

New English EP

EP by Ambulance LTD
- Released: March 14, 2006
- Recorded: 2004–2005
- Genre: Indie rock
- Length: 24:33
- Label: TVT Records
- Producer: Ambulance LTD

Ambulance LTD chronology
LP (2004)	New English EP (2006)

Professional ratings
Review scores
Source	Rating
Allmusic	link

New English EP is an EP released by Ambulance LTD on March 14, 2006, containing new songs, old demos from their first album, LP, and a cover of a Pink Floyd song ("Fearless"). According to their official website, it was intended to tide over fans until the release of their second full-length album in the fall of 2007 (which did not come to pass).

== Track listing ==
1. "New English" – 2:33
2. "Arbuckle's Swan Song" – 2:52
3. "Fearless" (live) - 5:03
4. "Heavy Lifting" (acoustic demo) – 2:18
5. "Sugar Pill" (demo) - 3:51
6. "Country Gentleman" – 3:33
7. "Straight A's" – 4:24

== Credits ==
- All songs written by Marcus Congleton, except:
  - "Arbuckle's Swan Song" written by Matthew Dublin.
  - "Fearless" written by Roger Waters and David Gilmour.
- "New English" recorded and mixed by John Davis and Ambulance LTD at the Bunker, Brooklyn.
- "Arbuckle's Swan Song" produced, recorded, and mixed by Barny and Ambulance LTD at Rockfield Studios, Wales.
- "Fearless" recorded live at Napster in Los Angeles. Produced by Ambulance LTD. Recorded by Martin Beal. Additional keyboards by Eric Ronick.
- "Heavy Lifting" recorded by Marcus Congleton.
- "Sugar Pill" produced and mixed by Chris Zane and Ambulance LTD at Gigantic Studios.
- "Country Gentleman" produced by Ambulance LTD and Joel Berret.
- "Straight A's" produced by Chris Zane and Ambulance LTD at Gigantic Studios. Mixed by Barny at Soundtrack Studios, New York.
- Band photography: Jasper Coolidge and Eliot Wilder.
- Design and photography by Benjamin Wheelock.
- A&R - Leonard B. Johnson
