= Devin Therriault =

American musician

- Also known as: Devin
- Born: 1988/1989; Brooklyn, New York City, United States
- Genre: Rock and roll
- Years active: 2011–present
- Labels: Frenchkiss, No Evil

Devin Therriault (born 1988/89) is an American musician, known under the artist name of Devin. He released his debut album in 2012.

== Career ==
Born in Brooklyn, after graduating from art college, Therriault started writing songs while working in a shipping warehouse in Red Hook. He was signed to Frenchkiss Records on the strength of a self-recorded demo, the label releasing his debut single, "You're Mine" in November 2011.

In February 2012 he toured with Heartless Bastards, and a performance at the SxSW festival in March brought him to the attention of international music publications. His debut album, Romancing, produced by Chris Zane, was released in April. The album was generally well received by critics, with the NME giving it a 7/10 score and describing it as "full of brash, exciting music". Rolling Stone called it "a gleeful romp that effortlessly captures passion and energy of his band's flamboyant live show". The BBC called it a "scintillating debut LP". Allmusic gave it four stars, with Tim Sendra calling it "as good as rock & roll gets in 2012". PopMatters called it "a smart blast of infectiously fun, hook-laden punk-infused, rock n’ roll". The Guardian's Michael Hann gave it two stars (out of five), viewing the songs as weak. It was named 'album of the week' by Triple J.

His touring band included bassist Steve Jewett and drummer Angus Tarnawsky.

== Musical style ==
Therriault's music has been described as rock and roll. He cites Johnny Thunders and Iggy Pop as his main influences, along with The Strokes and The Libertines. Allmusic described his music as "cool, rowdy guitar rock [that] makes a connection between '70s Detroit rock & roll and '50s Memphis rockabilly." Rolling Stone stated that his album merged "the raw energy of the Ramones and the Stooges with the glamor of the Strokes". Louder Than War described his music as "energetic, ratty-guitared tracks up to the eyeballs in layers of sound". The New Yorker described him as "a more pop-oriented Jack White".

== Discography ==
=== Albums ===
- Romancing (2012), Frenchkiss/No Evil

=== Singles ===
- "You're Mine" (2011), Frenchkiss
- "Romancing" (2012), No Evil
