= Shy Child =

American electronic music duo

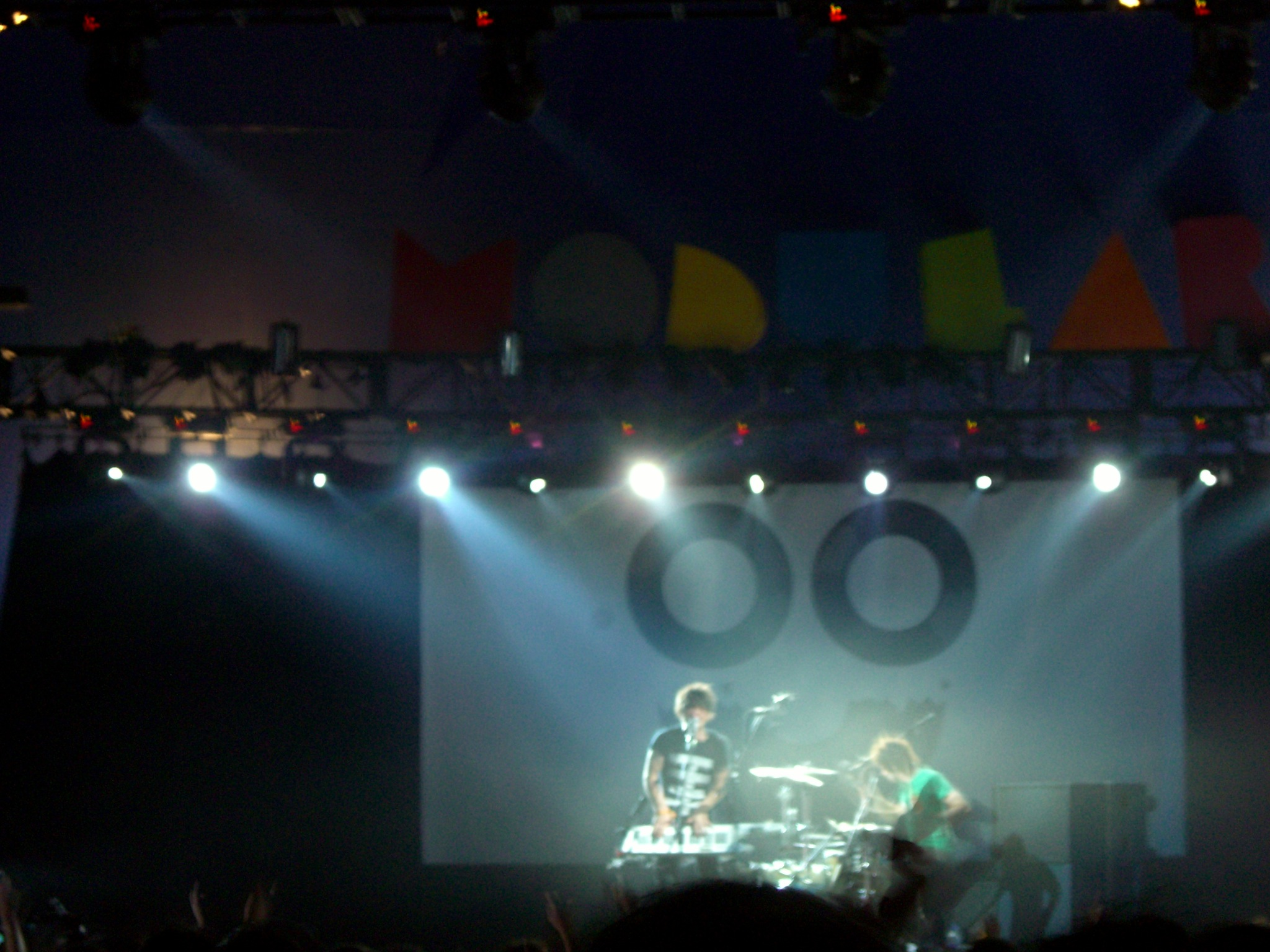
- Shy Child at the Oxygen Festival in London 2007

Background information
- Origin: New York City, New York, United States
- Genres: Indietronica, synthpop, alternative dance
- Years active: 2000–2010
- Labels: Current: Gigantic Music, Wall of Sound; Former: Kill Rock Stars, Say Hey Records, Romz Record, Grenadine Records
- Members: Pete Cafarella; Nate Smith
- Website: www.shychild.com

Shy Child were an American electronic music duo from New York City, United States, consisting of Pete Cafarella on vocals and synthesizers and Nate Smith on drums.

== History ==
Shy Child formed in the summer of 2000, when former college friends Pete Cafarella and Nate Smith separately moved to New York City. The duo shared a love for progressive rock and electronic music, and started playing music together in an attempt to create a fusion of the genres. Shy Child recorded their debut album, Please Consider Our Time, in 2001. Originally sold through local record shops, Grenadine Records signed the band and re-released it proper in 2002, followed by the Humanity EP in 2003.

In 2004 the band released their second album, One with the Sun, on New York label Say Hey Records. Two singles were later released in the UK from the album, "The Noise Won't Stop" and "Technicrats", though the album itself was only released in North America.

Shy Child began playing steadily in the UK in 2006, and they also started working on their next album with producers Chris Zane and Paul Epworth. In the summer of 2006, they signed with UK label Wall of Sound. A U.S. tour supporting Hot Chip followed in the fall.

In early 2007, Shy Child released the singles "Drop the Phone" and "Noise Won't Stop" in the UK. They supported Klaxons on their tour of England in May, the same month that they released their third album, Noise Won't Stop. The band toured extensively in the UK and Europe in the summer of 2007, playing at Barcelona Acció Musical, London's O2 Wireless Festival, the Reading and Leeds Festivals, and Bestival, among others. They also supported Muse at Wembley Stadium on June 17, 2007, becoming the first American act to play the new Wembley Stadium. The group released the single "Summer" in September 2007, followed by an October headline tour around the UK. "Drop the Phone" was re-released in November.

Shy Child toured New Zealand and Australia as part of the Big Day Out Festival in January and February 2008, and opened for Björk at the forecourt of the Sydney Opera House as well. "Noise Won't Stop" was released in the US by Kill Rock Stars in May 2008.

In March 2010, Shy Child released a new single, "Disconnected" and their fourth studio album, Liquid Love. A UK tour to support the album had to be rescheduled due to Cafarella suffering concussion. A second single, "Open Up the Sky", was released later in the year. In September 2010, Liquid Love was released in North America by Gigantic Music. This would be the duo's final project before becoming inactive, and they have not released any new material for over a decade after Liquid Love.

== Side projects ==
Before Shy Child, Pete Cafarella had been playing synthesizer in El Guapo, later known as Supersystem. Nate Smith was drumming for another New York duo, Touchdown.

== Instrumentation ==
Cafarella is well known for playing entire songs using only a keytar. The keytar in question, a Roland AX-7, accompanied the band through all of their tours until 2010, when it was replaced by two regular synthesizers. When asked about this, Cafarella responded with "[the keytar is] kinda broken", and also that he felt people were not taking the band seriously because of it.

== Television ==
Shy Child performed "The Noise Won't Stop" on Channel 4's Transmission in May 2007. In June of the same year, they performed "Drop the Phone" on the BBC television show, Later... with Jools Holland. In October 2007, Shy Child performed the same song for Stella McCartney during the Swarovski Fashion Rocks event at Royal Albert Hall in London, which was broadcast worldwide. They have also appeared on the UK television shows The Culture Show, and Death Disco.

== Discography ==
=== Studio albums ===
- Please Consider Our Time (2002)
- One with the Sun (2004)
- Noise Won't Stop (2007)
- Liquid Love (2010)

=== EPs ===
- Humanity EP (2003)

=== Singles ===
- "Noise Won't Stop" (2004)
- "Technicrats" (2006)
- "Drop the Phone" (2007)
- "Noise Won't Stop" (re-release) (2007)
- "Summer" (2007)
- "Disconnected" (2010)
- "Open Up the Sky" (2010)

=== Remixes ===
Shy Child has remixed songs for Midnight Juggernauts, The Futureheads, Tokyo Police Club, Editors, and many others; their remixed version of The Boggs' "Arm in Arm" was featured in a trailer for Grand Theft Auto IV and appeared in the game. Artists and bands that have remixed Shy Child include Buraka Som Sistema, Busy P, Infadels, and others.
