= Liquid Love (Shy Child album) =

Studio album by Shy Child
- Released: 15 March 2010
- Recorded: March–August 2009
- Genre: Electronica, synthpop, alternative dance
- Length: 47:12
- Label: Wall of Sound
- Producer: Chris Zane

Shy Child chronology
Noise Won't Stop (2007)	Liquid Love (2010)

Liquid Love is the fourth studio album by New York City synthpop duo Shy Child.

== Release ==
The band announced in December 2009 that they had completed their fourth album and gave away a free track, Criss Cross, to promote it. A single, Disconnected was released digitally on 7 March.

The original release date. 1 March 2010, was moved back to the 15th. A UK tour was scheduled but vocalist Pete Cafarella suffered concussion, and had to cancel the upcoming tour; the tour was rescheduled for April and May.

Second single Open Up the Sky was released in June.

Liquid Love was released digitally in the U.S. by Gigantic Music on 21 September 2010, with a vinyl release.

== Track listing ==
1. 'Liquid Love' - 4:48
2. 'Disconnected' - 4:07
3. 'Take Us Apart' - 3:57
4. 'Criss Cross' - 7:22
5. 'The Beatles' - 4:24
6. 'Open Up the Sky' - 5:25
7. 'ESP' - 4:20
8. 'Depth of Feel' - 4:09
9. 'Strange Emotion' - 3:30
10. 'Dark Destiny' - 5:10

== Reception ==
Professional ratings
Review scores
Source	Rating
NME	link
BBC	(favorable) link
The Guardian	link
MusicOMH	link
Drowned in Sound	link
Pitchfork Media	(7.0/10) link
Sputnikmusic	link
Leeds Music Scene	link

Reviews for the album have been mixed. NME criticized the album, describing it as being "rather lame" compared to their previous album, which they praised. Other reviews, however, praised the album for being reminiscent of retro synthpop albums. Drowned in Sound also praised the album for being cheesy, with "falseto vocals and dumb melodies that prod and niggle at your brain".
