= Pacific Air =

2010s American indie pop band

- Origin: Los Angeles, California, U.S.
- Genres: Indie rock, indie pop, synthpop
- Years active: 2012–2014
- Labels: Republic Records
- Members: Ryan Lawhon; Taylor Lawhon
- Website: www.pacificairmusic.com

Pacific Air was an American indie pop band formed in 2012. The band consisted of brothers Ryan and Taylor Lawhon. They were previously known as "KO KO".

== History ==
The Lawhon brothers formed KO KO in 2012. They released three songs on Bandcamp and, a week later, received a record deal from Republic Records. Due to the number of other groups using the "KO KO" moniker, the group changed its name to Pacific Air and began work on their first EP.

In October 2012, the group released the Long Live KOKO EP. The record received critical acclaim, as did the EP's lead single, "Float". "Float" gained popularity following a surge of Hype Machine success and a number of remixes including Ra Ra Riot, RAC, TheFatRat, Robert Delong and Sound Remedy. Shortly after the release of the EP, Pacific Air embarked on several tours, opening for bands such as Passion Pit, Walk the Moon, Two Door Cinema Club, Ra Ra Riot, and Atlas Genius. During this time, they also promoted their debut studio album, Stop Talking, which was released on June 11, 2013.

The band reached "its end, for now" in September 2014 when Ryan Lawhon announced his new solo project, Mating Ritual.

== Members ==
Current members

- Ryan Lawhon– lead vocals, guitar (2012–present)
- Taylor Lawhon – vocals, keyboards, tambourine, sleigh bells, flute (2012–present)

Touring members

- Steven Lindenfelser - guitar (2012–present)
- Alex Lopez – bass (2012–present)
- Dan Bailey - drums (2012-2013)

== Discography ==
- Long Live KOKO EP (2012)
- Stop Talking (2013)
