= Citrus (album) =

Studio album by Asobi Seksu
- Released: May 30, 2006
- Recorded: 2005
- Studios: Gigantic (New York, New York)
- Genres: Shoegaze; dream pop
- Length: 47:26
- Label: Friendly Fire
- Producer: Chris Zane

Asobi Seksu chronology
| Asobi Seksu (2002) | Citrus (2006) | Live at the Echo 10/6/06 (2006) |

Singles from Citrus
- 1. "Thursday" Released: August 6, 2007; 2. "Strawberries" Released: November 12, 2007; 3. "Goodbye" Released: February 25, 2008

Citrus is the second studio album by American shoegaze band Asobi Seksu. It was released on May 30, 2006, in the United States by Friendly Fire Recordings, and on August 13, 2007, in the United Kingdom by One Little Indian Records.

Three singles were released from Citrus: "Thursday" on August 6, 2007, "Strawberries" on November 12, 2007, and "Goodbye" on February 25, 2008.

== Critical reception ==
Professional ratings
Aggregate scores
| Source | Rating |
|---|---|
| Metacritic | 80/100 |
Review scores
| Source | Rating |
| AllMusic | 4/5 stars |
| DIY | 4/5 stars |
| Drowned in Sound | 9/10 |
| The Guardian | 3/5 stars |
| MusicOMH | 4.5/5 stars |
| Pitchfork | 8.3/10 |
| PopMatters | 7/10 |
| The Skinny | 4/5 stars |
| Tiny Mix Tapes | 4/5 |
| Uncut | 3/5 stars |

In 2016, Pitchfork ranked Citrus as the 37th best shoegaze album of all time. Tim Sendra of AllMusic said that "Citrus is as good a shoegaze record as you will ever hear, regardless of release date"; critics drew comparisons to bands including Moose, My Bloody Valentine, Cocteau Twins, and OMD.

== In popular culture ==
Music from Citrus was used in the British TV series Skins: "Thursday" appeared in "Tony and Maxxie", the first episode of season 2 (which aired February 11, 2008), and the song "Nefi + Girly" was featured in "Everyone", the first episode of season 3 (which aired January 22, 2009).

== Track listing ==
All tracks are written by Yuki Chikudate and James Hanna, except where noted.

| No. | Title | Length |
|---|---|---|
| 1. | "Everything Is On" | 0:17 |
| 2. | "Strawberries" | 3:57 |
| 3. | "New Years" | 3:01 |
| 4. | "Thursday" | 4:17 |
| 5. | "Strings" | 5:27 |
| 6. | "Pink Cloud Tracing Paper" | 3:27 |
| 7. | "Red Sea" | 7:45 |
| 8. | "Goodbye" | 3:44 |
| 9. | "Lions and Tigers" | 4:08 |
| 10. | "Nefi + Girly" | 4:37 |
| 11. | "Exotic Animal Paradise" | 4:06 |
| 12. | "Mizu Asobi" | 2:40 |
| Total length: | | 47:26 |

Japanese edition bonus tracks
| No. | Title | Writer(s) | Length |
|---|---|---|---|
| 13. | "All Through the Day" | Jerome Kern; Oscar Hammerstein II | 3:07 |
| 14. | "Merry Christmas (I Don't Want to Fight Tonight)" | Joey Ramone | 3:08 |
| Total length: | | | 53:41 |

UK edition bonus track
| No. | Title | Writer(s) | Length |
|---|---|---|---|
| 13. | "All Through the Day" | Kern; Hammerstein | 3:07 |
| Total length: | | | 50:33 |

== Personnel ==
Credits are adapted from the album's liner notes.

Asobi Seksu

- Yuki Chikudate – vocals, synthesizer, organ, toy piano, bells
- Bryan Greene – drums
- Haji – bass, guitar
- James Hanna – guitar, vocals

Additional musicians

- Alex Nazaryan – viola
- Chris Zane – percussion

Production

- Alex Aldi – engineering (assistant)
- Billy Pavone – engineering
- Sarah Register – mastering
- Chris Zane – production, mixing

Design

- Annie Chiu – styling, assistance
- Sean McCabe – art direction, design, photography

== Charts ==
| Chart (2007) | Peak position |
|---|---|
| UK Independent Albums (Official Charts) | 21 |
