= Calla (band) =

American indie rock band

- Origin: New York City, United States
- Genres: Indie rock, post-rock, noise rock
- Years active: 1997–2007, 2024–present
- Labels: Sub Rosa; Talitres; Young God Records; Beggars Banquet Records; Arena Rock Recording Co. Nuevo Leon Recordings
- Members: Aurelio Valle; Wayne B. Magruder; Peter Gannon
- Past members: Sean Donovan
- Website: callamusic.com

Calla is an American indie rock band formed in New York City in 1997 by Aurelio Valle (guitar, vocals), Sean Donovan (bass, keyboards, programming), and Wayne B. Magruder (percussion, programming). After a hiatus beginning in 2007, the band returned with new music in 2024. Their sixth studio album, De Facto, was released on October 9, 2026.

== History ==
=== Texas ===
Valle was raised in South Texas and grew up listening to his Mexican parents' music, which included mariachi, conjuntos and rancheros. During his teen years in the 80's Valle listened to college music and punk rock. Drawing from these musical styles his guitar influences are inspired by the likes of Rowland S. Howard, Duane Eddy, Kid Congo Powers, Chet Atkins, Lee Ranaldo, Will Sergeant, and Johnny Marr. He met Peter Gannon during his second year in high school. Both citing bands like The Jesus and Mary Chain and The Smiths as influences, they decided to form a band. After high school, they relocated to Denton, Texas where the two met Wayne Magruder and immediately formed a band called The Factory Press named after Andy Warhol's Factory and Factory Records Their influences were Joy Division, Bauhaus and Wire and they were signed to Austin's ND Records.

=== New York City ===
The Factory Press relocated to New York City in 1995. The band played shows alongside peers and friends Jonathan Fire Eater Speedball Baby and The Stiffs inc. They recorded their only full-length album The Smoky Ends of a Burnt Out Dayin 1997. The album was produced by Matt Verta-Ray (Madder Rose, Speedball Baby) and Kid Congo Powers (The Gunclub, The Cramps and Nick Cave and the Bad Seeds). After recording their final record for ND Records, Valle and Magruder along with Sean Donovan formed CALLA in 1997 named after the lilies in Robert Mapplethorpe's photographs. One of the bands concepts was to write music that sounded like Ennio Morricone meets Blade Runner. CALLA continued to draw from their early influences in addition to Tom Waits, John Cage, Angelo Badalamenti/Julee Cruise, Talk Talk and Latin Playboys. CALLA's first self-titled record was released by the European experimental label Sub Rosa.

=== Sub Rosa/Quartermass ===
By 1997, CALLA was playing shows at The Cooler located on West 14th Street meat packing district in New York City alongside Alan Vega, Bush Tetras, Thurston Moore, Blonde Redhead, Bowery Electric, Labradford, and were invited to play a benefit for Silver Apples' Simeon Coxe. They also played CBGB's in 1998 with Speedball Baby. By this time the band had already toured in Europe and was ready to set off on its first US tour.

=== Young God Records ===
CALLA frequently played shows at Lower East Side Club Tonic where they eventually met Michael Gira of Swans and The Angels of Light. Gira signed CALLA to his label, Young God Records, in 1999, for which they recorded their second record titled Scavengers . Gira assisted in producing and sang backing vocals on the track "Love of Ivah". During this time the band continued to tour heavily in Europe. In 2000 they were selected by Alternative Press Magazine as "the number one band to watch" out of 50 peers and New York City bands. When playing in New York, CALLA often billed alongside their friends Interpol, The Walkmen, The Angels of Light, Godspeed You! Black Emperor, Luna and The Secret Machines.

=== Arena Rock Recording Company ===
With the momentum from the release of Scavengers, the band signed with Williamsburg, Brooklyn-based indie label Arena Rock Recording Company. In 2002, the band went into the studio with producer Chris Zane to record their third record Televised. The album was released in 2003 and was supported by extensive US and European tours. The band played shows in support of Nick Cave and the Bad Seeds, Interpol, The Walkmen Their first videos were made by Moh Azima and Greg Brunkalla for the songs "Televise" and "Strangler" respectively and were played on MTV and MTV2.

=== Beggars Group ===
CALLA's fourth album, Collisions, was recorded after the departure of member Donovan and addition of The Factory Press member Peter Gannon. The album was recorded independently with producer Chris Zane with additional production by Victor Van Vugt. They were signed to Beggars Group after the record was completed. In 2006, CALLA continued playing shows throughout Europe including Greece, Spain, Italy and a final headlining spot in Moscow.

During the band's US tour in support of Collisions, they were arrested at the Canada–US border for allegedly driving a stolen van. They were handcuffed and brought to the police station and then later released after it was discovered that the license plate had been registered as stolen due to a clerical error.

The band wrote and recorded tracks for its fifth record, Strength in Numbers, while on the road for Collisions. They put the final touches on the record with producer Alex Lyon at The Bubble in Austin, Texas.

CALLA continued to tour with Interpol in 2007 until the band decided it was time to take a hiatus. The band continues to work on projects together.

=== Return and De Facto ===
In November 2024, Calla released "Pick Your Battles", their first new music since Strength in Numbers in 2007.

The band followed with several additional singles, including "Killer On The Rampage", "Sinnerman", "Ritualized", and "Your Worst Enemy".

In September 2026, the band announced its sixth studio album, De Facto, scheduled for release on October 9, 2026, through Nuevo Leon Recordings. The announcement was accompanied by the single "Paralyzed".

== Aurelio Valle solo work ==
Valle co-wrote and contributed vocals to the Phenomenal Handclap Band's 2009 song "Testimony" along with Jaleel Bunton of TV on the Radio.

In, 2009 Aurelio Valle wrote the song "Electraglide" for Nina Persson (The Cardigans, A Camp), featured in the film Tender Parasites. He also recorded a cover of the Yello song "Lost Again" for the same project.

Valle released his debut solo album Acme Power Transmission on May 30, 2014, which was recorded in his apartment in 2013. Aurelio Valle is currently working on scoring for commercials and film.

Valle scored the 2004 feature film Egoshooter directed by Oliver Schwabe and Christian Becker, produced by Wim Wenders. In 2005, CALLA scored the feature film Satellite for Jeff Winner produced Gigantic Pictures. The CALLA song "Astral" was featured in the 2004 film The Manchurian Candidate directed by Jonathan Demme. In 2007, The CALLA song "Swagger" was featured in the feature film Weirdsville directed by Alan Moyle. Valle scored the short film "Vamonos", directed by Maurice Compte which aired on Showtime.

In 2009, the CALLA song "Fear of Fireflies" was featured in the documentary "Fireflies" directed by Gili Meisler. That same year, Valle scored the German feature film Tender Parasites directed by Oliver Schwabe and Christian Becker. In 2011, the original score for Tender Parasites received a nomination for the German Film Academy Award (Deutscher Filmpreis).

== Band members ==
- 1997–present, Aurelio Valle (guitar, vocals)
- 1997–present, Wayne B. Magruder (percussion, samples) Producer, electronic composer and a one time member of Bowery Electric. Solo recordings released under the names Tenecke, Wayne B., and Highway Robbery. Currently resides in Austin, Texas.
- 2003–present, Peter Gannon (bass, guitar)
- 1997–2004, Sean Donovan (bass, keyboards, samples)

== Discography ==
Year	Title	Label	Type
1999	Calla	Sub Rosa	Album
2001	"Custom"	Quartermass	Single
2001	Scavengers	Young God	Album
2003	"Televised"	Rykodisc (UK only)	Single
2003	Televise	Arena Rock Recording Co.	Album
2004	"Strangler"	Rykodisc (UK only)	Single
2004	Calla (Re-issue)	Arena Rock Recording Co.	Album
2005	Collisions	Beggars Banquet Records	Album
2007	Strength In Numbers	Beggars Banquet Records	Album
2026	De Facto	Nuevo Leon Recordings	Album

=== Other releases ===
- "Awake and Under", track for This Is Next Year: A Brooklyn-Based Compilation (2001)
- "Astral", track for The Manchurian Candidate film soundtrack (2004)
