= Grenadine Records =

- Founded: March 1999
- Founder: Eric Y. Lapointe and Alex Megelas
- Distributor(s): FAB Distribution; Scratch Distribution; Carrot Top Records; Choke; Revolver Music, No Records
- Country of origin: Canada
- Location: Montreal, Quebec
- Official website: grenadinerecords.com

Grenadine Records was an independent record label based in Montreal, Quebec, Canada. The music label was founded in 1997 by Eric Y. Lapointe and Alex Megelas who met at Bishop's University's radio station CJMQ-FM.

The label, initially named Bittersweet Records, released two 7" vinyl records and then changed its name in 1999 when a New York City-based label of the same name was discovered. The label was officially announced as Grenadine Records as of March 1999 along with its first CD release Syrup & Gasoline Vol.1 which was a compilation of bands from across Canada. The label's tagline of "Timeless Pop Attitude" reflected the label's interest in a variety of pop music with sometimes earlier influences.

As part of its commitment to a range of musical expressions, the label released albums in both English and French.

== Artists ==
The following artists have released albums with Grenadine Records:

- Alexis O'Hara
- the American Devices
- Blurtonia
- the Dears
- Eux Autres
- the Frenetics
- LowBrow
- Melon Galia
- music for mapmakers
- Nightwood
- Les Sequelles
- Shy Child
- Starvin Hungry
- Tricky Woo
- Shane Watt

== See also ==
- List of record labels
