= Jack and Eliza =

Alternative rock band

Jack and Eliza (also called Jack + Eliza) is an alternative rock band formed in New York City in 2012, consisting of childhood friends Eliza Callahan and Jack Staffen. Callahan and Staffen both started playing music when they were young, but began songwriting together in high school. Their music has been compared to the sunshine pop and surf music of the 60s and 70s and self-described as "naked pop.” In 2017, the duo formed a new musical group, Purr.

== Discography ==
=== Albums ===
- Gentle Warnings (2015)

=== EPs ===
- No Wonders (2014)

=== Singles ===
- Secrets (2014)
