= Arena Rock Recording Company =

American independent record label

- Founded: 1995
- Founder: Greg Clover; Dan Ralph
- Distributors: Redeye (US); Koch (CAN)
- Genre: Indie rock, alternative, post-rock
- Country of origin: U.S.
- Location: Portland, Oregon
- Official website: arenarock.com

Arena Rock Recording Company ("Arena Rock" or "ARRCO") is an independent record label based in Portland, Oregon. Albums are distributed by Redeye in the United States and Koch in Canada.

Arena Rock was formed in 1995 in Brooklyn, New York, by Greg Glover and Dan Ralph as a hobby label. Glover later began working on the label full-time after leaving London Records. In 2004, Arena Rock moved to Portland, Oregon.

== Roster ==
- Actionslacks
- The Album Leaf
- Jon Auer
- The Autumn Defense
- The Boggs
- Calla
- Creeper Lagoon
- Daniel Amos
- Elf Power
- Germans
- The Gloria Record
- Grand Mal
- Harvey Danger
- Hem
- Home
- Liars
- The Life And Times
- Luna
- Mink Lungs
- Minus the Bear
- Mitch Mitchell's Terrifying Experience
- Mono
- Larry Norman
- On! Air! Library!
- Oneida
- Pilot to Gunner
- The Sheila Divine
- Solex
- Ken Stringfellow
- Superdrag
- Swords
- Talkdemonic
- Wroom

== Compilations ==
- Fuel Soundtrack – 1997
- This Is Next Year: A Brooklyn-Based Compilation – 2001
- Bridging the Distance, a Portland, OR covers compilation' to benefit p:ear – 2007

== See also ==
- List of record labels
