= Passion Pit discography =

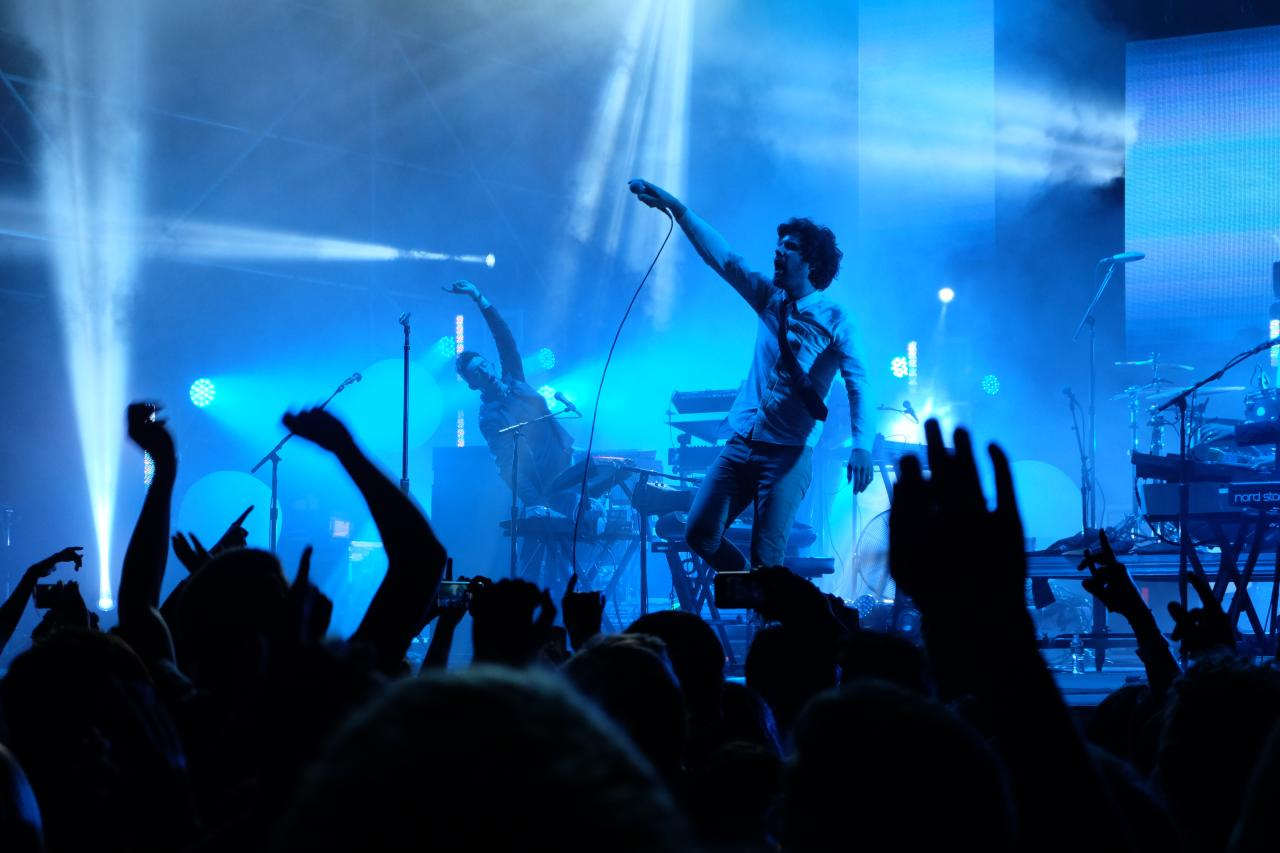
- Passion Pit in 2013
- Studio albums: 4
- Extended plays: 3
- Singles: 14

The discography of Passion Pit, an American indietronica band, has released four studio albums, three extended plays and fourteen singles.

== Studio albums ==
List of studio albums, with selected chart positions and sales figures
Title	Album details	Peak chart positions										Sales
Title	Album details	US	AUS	BEL	CAN	FRA	IRE	JPN	NZ	SCO	UK	Sales
Manners	Released: May 19, 2009; Label: Frenchkiss, Columbia; Formats: CD, LP, digital download	51	19	—	—	123	30	79	—	88	55	RIAA: Gold
Gossamer	Released: July 24, 2012; Label: Frenchkiss, Columbia; Formats: CD, LP, digital download	4	12	149	17	—	33	50	31	77	56	RIAA: Gold
Kindred	Released: April 21, 2015; Label: Columbia; Formats: CD, LP, digital download	23	30	—	—	—	89	35	—	—	81	
Tremendous Sea of Love	Released: July 28, 2017; Label: Wishart Group Recordings; Formats: digital download	—	—	—	—	—	—	—	—	—	—	
"—" denotes a recording that did not chart or was not released in that territory.

== Extended plays ==
List of extended plays, with selected chart positions
Title	EP details	Peak chart positions		
Title	EP details	US Heat.	ARIA Hit	FRA
Chunk of Change	Released: September 16, 2008; Label: Frenchkiss, Columbia; Formats: CD, LP, digital download	35	13	58
iTunes Festival: London 2009	Released: September 24, 2013; Label: Frenchkiss; Formats: Digital download	—	—	—
Constant Conversations	Released: September 24, 2013; Label: Frenchkiss, Columbia; Formats: Digital download	—	—	—
"—" denotes a recording that did not chart or was not released in that territory.

== Singles ==
=== As lead artist ===
List of singles as lead artist, with selected chart positions and certifications, showing year released and album name
Title	Year	Peak chart positions										Certifications	Album
Title	Year	US	US Rock	AUS	BEL	CAN	FRA	JPN	MEX	SCO	UK	Certifications	Album
"Sleepyhead"	2008	— (Note: "Sleepyhead" did not enter the Billboard Hot 100, but peaked at number 4 on the Bubbling Under Hot 100 Singles chart, which acts as an extension to the Hot 100.)	— (Note: "Sleepyhead" did not enter the Hot Rock & Alternative Songs chart, but peaked at number 41 on the Rock Digital Songs chart.)	—	—	71	—	—	—	—	—	RIAA: 2× Platinum; BPI: Silver	Manners
"The Reeling"	2009	— (Note: "The Reeling" did not enter the Billboard Hot 100, but peaked at number 45 on the Hot Singles Sales chart.)	— (Note: "The Reeling" did not enter the Hot Rock & Alternative Songs chart, but peaked at number 34 on the Alternative Airplay chart.)	— (Note: "The Reeling" did not enter the Australian ARIA Singles Chart but peaked at number eight on the ARIA Hitseekers Singles Chart.)	—	—	—	42	—	74	99		Manners
"To Kingdom Come"	2009	—	—	—	—	—	—	—	—	—	—		Manners
"Little Secrets"	2009	— (Note: "Little Secrets" did not enter the Billboard Hot 100, but peaked at number 23 on the Hot Singles Sales chart.)	— (Note: "Little Secrets" did not enter the Hot Rock & Alternative Songs chart, but peaked at number 39 on the Alternative Airplay chart.)	48	—	—	—	—	18	—	—		Manners
"Tonight, Tonight" (Note: Denotes a cover of "Tonight, Tonight" by The Smashing Pumpkins.)	2010	—	—	—	—	—	—	—	—	—	—		Non-album single
"Take a Walk"	2012	84	9	—	77	97	84	36	29	—	—	RIAA: 2× Platinum; BPI: Silver	Gossamer
"I'll Be Alright"	2012	—	—	—	—	—	—	—	—	—	—		Gossamer
"Constant Conversations"	2012	—	—	—	138	—	—	—	—	—	—		Gossamer
"Carried Away"	2013	—	24	—	—	—	—	—	—	—	—		Gossamer
"Cry Like a Ghost"	2013	—	—	—	—	—	—	—	—	—	—		Gossamer
"Lifted Up (1985)"	2015	—	31	—	—	—	—	77	—	—	—		Kindred
"Where the Sky Hangs"	2015	—	—	—	—	—	—	—	—	—	—		Kindred
"Until We Can't (Let's Go)"	2015	—	—	—	—	—	—	—	—	—	—		Kindred
"I Found U" (with Galantis)	2019	—	—	—	—	—	—	—	—	—	—		Church
"—" denotes a recording that did not chart or was not released in that territory.

=== As featured artist ===
List of singles as featured artist, with selected chart positions, showing year released and album name
Title	Year	Peak chart positions				Album
Title	Year	US Dance	BEL	CIS	JPN	Album
"Pay No Mind" (Madeon featuring Passion Pit)	2015	29	78	177	67	Adventure

== Other charted songs ==
Title	Year	Peak chart positions	Album
Title	Year	MEX	Album
"Moth's Wings"	2009	18	Manners

== Remixes ==
Year	Original artist	Song
2009	Gotye	"Learnalilgivinanlovin"
2009	Marina and the Diamonds	"I Am Not a Robot"
2009	Phoenix	"1901"
2009	Phoenix	"Love Like a Sunset"
2009	Yeah Yeah Yeahs	"Heads Will Roll"
2010	ARMS	"Heat & Hot Water"
2010	Dan Black	"Symphonies"
2010	Chairlift	"Bruises"
2010	Lady Gaga featuring Beyoncé	"Telephone"
2010	OK Go	"This Too Shall Pass"
2010	Paper Route	"Tiger Teeth"
2010	Katy Perry featuring Snoop Dogg	"California Gurls"
2010	Ra Ra Riot	"Ghost Under Rocks"
2010	Shout Out Louds	"Fall Hard"
2010	Tegan and Sara	"Alligator"
2010	The Ting Tings	"Hands"
2010	Tokyo Police Club	"Wait Up (Boots of Danger)"
2010	Max Tundra	"Which Song"
2010	Two Door Cinema Club	"Undercover Martyn"
2010	The Smashing Pumpkins	"Tonight, Tonight"
2011	Beastie Boys	"Make Some Noise"
2011	Bruno Mars	"Grenade"
2011	Cold War Kids	"Mine Is Yours"
2011	Of Monsters and Men	"Little Talks"
2012	Crystal Fighters	"At Home"
2012	Imagine Dragons	"It's Time"
2013	Claire	"Games"
2013	Portugal. The Man	"Purple, Yellow, Red and Blue"
2013	St. Lucia	"Elevate"
2014	Christina Perri	"Human"
2014	In The Valley Below	"Peaches"
2024	Casper Caan	"Hearts Are Opening Up"

== Other appearances ==
List of other appearances, showing year released and album name
Title	Year	Album
"Tonight, Tonight"	2010	Levi's Pioneer Sessions 2010 Revival Recordings
"Where I Come From"	2012	The Twilight Saga: Breaking Dawn – Part 2
"Almost There"	2012	Frankenweenie Unleashed!
