= List of songs recorded by Passion Pit =

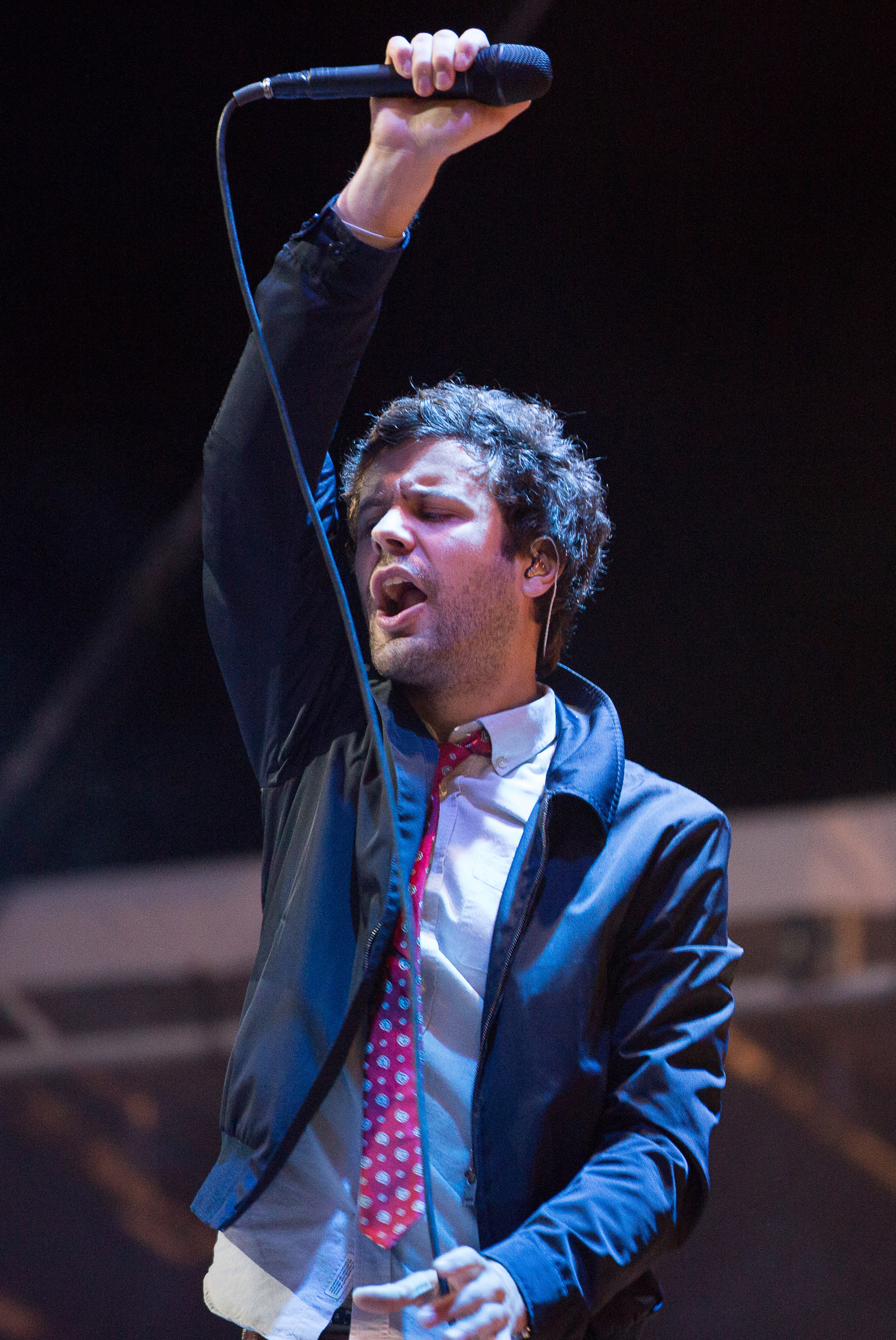
Michael Angelakos (pictured in 2015) has written or co-written every original Passion Pit song to date.

American electropop band Passion Pit has recorded forty-six songs across three studio albums, three extended plays, and two guest features. The band was formed in 2007, when former guitarist Ian Hultquist persuaded Michael Angelakos and other Boston musicians to play the songs from a mixtape Angelakos had made for his girlfriend. Their live performances soon caught the attention of Frenchkiss Records, who signed the group to the label shortly afterwards. In September 2008, the band released their first recorded material with the six track extended play Chunk of Change, which included the single "Sleepyhead". Following the success of Chunk of Change, the band released their debut studio album Manners in May 2009. The album had eleven songs, and featured a re-recorded version of "Sleepyhead", as well as three singles: "The Reeling", "To Kingdom Come", and "Little Secrets".

In 2010, Passion Pit signed to Columbia Records, and recorded cover versions of The Cranberries song "Dreams", and The Smashing Pumpkins' song "Tonight, Tonight". The group's second studio album, Gossamer, was released in July 2012. The album had twelve songs, including five singles: "Take a Walk", "I'll Be Alright", "Constant Conversations", "Carried Away", and "Cry Like a Ghost". Passion Pit ended the year by recording the song "Where I Come From" for The Twilight Saga: Breaking Dawn – Part 2 soundtrack in November.

In September 2013, Passion Pit released the four track extended play Constant Conversations, which included a cover of "Carry On" by Fun. The group would not release new material until February 2015, when they collaborated with Madeon to record the single "Pay No Mind", which appeared on Madeon's debut studio album Adventure. Passion Pit would then release their third studio album Kindred in April. The album had ten songs, including three singles: "Lifted Up (1985)", "Where the Sky Hangs", and "Until We Can't (Let's Go)".

== Songs ==
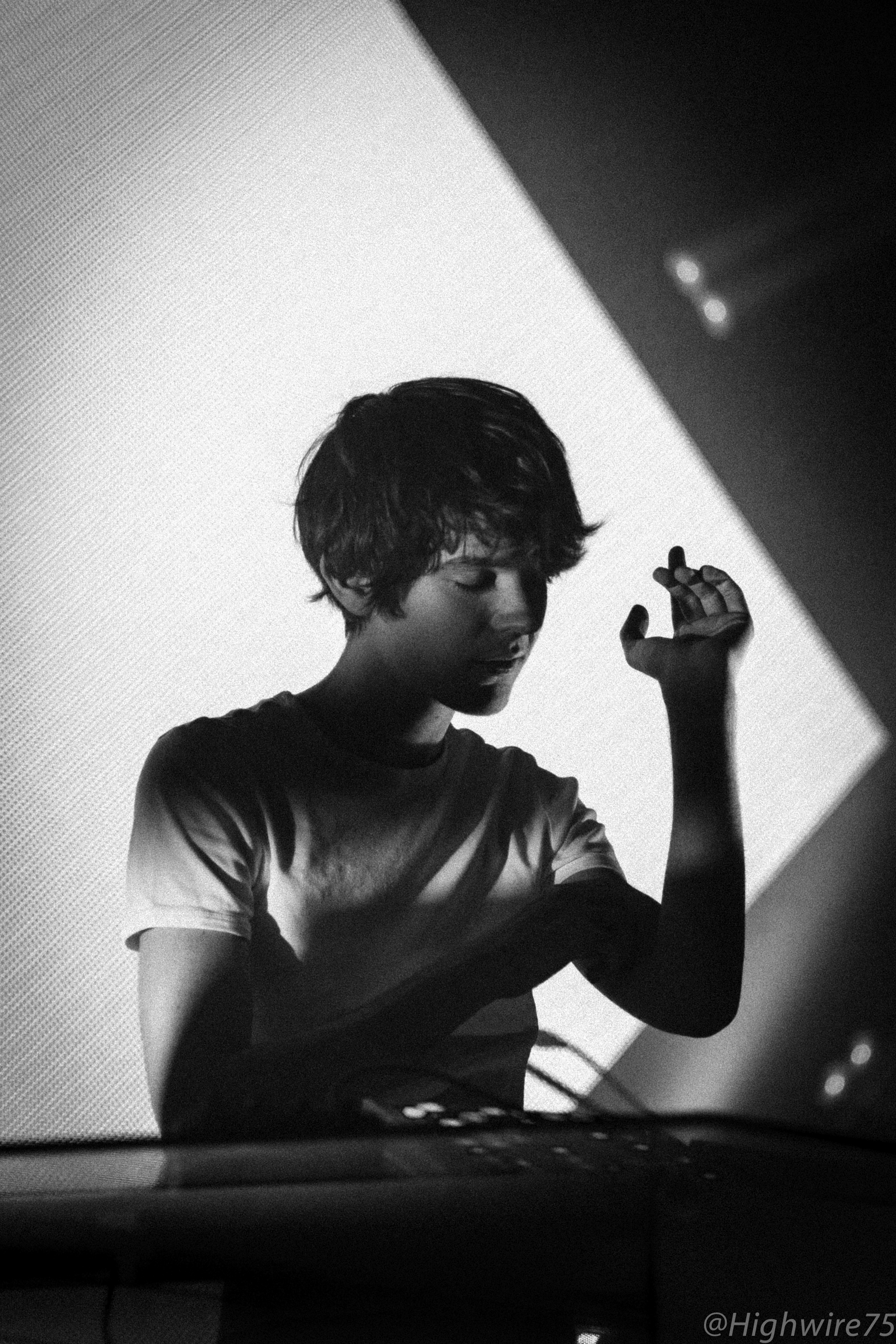
Madeon (pictured in 2015) and Passion Pit collaborated for the single "Pay No Mind", which appeared on Madeon's 2015 debut studio album Adventure.

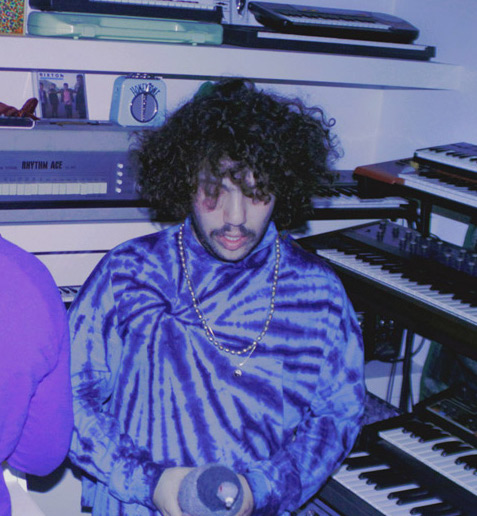
Benny Blanco (top, pictured in 2015) and Hans Zimmer (bottom, pictured in 2014) co-wrote four songs with Angelakos for Passion Pit's third studio album Kindred (2015).

Key
†	Indicates single release

Name of song, writers, originating album, and year released.
Song	Writer(s)	Original release	Year	Ref.
"All I Want"	Michael Angelakos; Benny Blanco	Kindred	2015	
"Almost There"	Michael Angelakos	Gossamer (Japanese edition)	2012	
"American Blood"	Michael Angelakos	Gossamer (iTunes Store pre-order edition)	2012	
"Better Things"	Michael Angelakos	Chunk of Change	2008	
"Carried Away" †	Michael Angelakos	Gossamer	2012	
"Carry On" (Note: Denotes a cover of "Carry On" by Fun.)	Nate Ruess; Andrew Dost; Jack Antonoff; Jeff Bhasker	Constant Conversations	2013	
"Constant Conversations" †	Michael Angelakos	Gossamer	2012	
"Cry Like a Ghost" †	Michael Angelakos	Gossamer	2012	
"Cuddle Fuddle"	Michael Angelakos	Chunk of Change	2008	
"Dancing on the Grave"	Michael Angelakos	Kindred	2015	
"Dreams" (Note: Denotes a cover of "Dreams" by The Cranberries.)	Noel Hogan; Dolores O'Riordan	Manners (Extended edition)	2010	
"Eyes as Candles"	Michael Angelakos	Manners	2009	
"Five Foot Ten (I)"	Michael Angelakos	Kindred	2015	
"Folds in Your Hands"	Michael Angelakos	Manners	2009	
"Hideaway"	Michael Angelakos	Gossamer	2012	
"I'll Be Alright" †	Michael Angelakos	Gossamer	2012	
"I've Got Your Number"	Michael Angelakos	Chunk of Change	2008	
"It's Not My Fault, I'm Happy"	Michael Angelakos	Gossamer	2012	
"Let Your Love Grow Tall"	Michael Angelakos	Manners	2009	
"Lifted Up (1985)" †	Michael Angelakos; Benny Blanco	Kindred	2015	
"Little Secrets" †	Michael Angelakos	Manners	2009	
"Live to Tell the Tale"	Michael Angelakos	Chunk of Change	2008	
"Looks Like Rain"	Michael Angelakos	Kindred	2015	
"Love Is Greed"	Michael Angelakos	Gossamer	2012	
"Make Light"	Michael Angelakos	Manners	2009	
"Mirrored Sea"	Michael Angelakos	Gossamer	2012	
"Moth's Wings"	Michael Angelakos	Manners	2009	
"My Brother Taught Me How to Swim"	Michael Angelakos	Kindred	2015	
"On My Way"	Michael Angelakos	Gossamer	2012	
"Pay No Mind" (Note: Passion Pit is credited as a featured artist for "Pay No Mind".) †	Michael Angelakos; Madeon	Adventure	2015	
"The Reeling" †	Michael Angelakos	Manners	2009	
"Ruin Your Day"	Michael Angelakos	Constant Conversations	2013	
"Seaweed Song"	Michael Angelakos	Manners	2009	
"Sleepyhead" †	Michael Angelakos; Mary O'Hara (Note: Mary O'Hara is credited as a writer, as "Sleepyhead" samples O'Hara's recording of "Óró Mo Bháidín".)	Chunk of Change	2008	
"Smile Upon Me"	Michael Angelakos	Chunk of Change	2008	
"Swimming in the Flood"	Michael Angelakos	Manners	2009	
"Take a Walk" †	Michael Angelakos	Gossamer	2012	
"Ten Feet Tall (II)"	Michael Angelakos	Kindred	2015	
"To Kingdom Come" †	Michael Angelakos	Manners	2009	
"Tonight, Tonight" (Note: Denotes a cover of "Tonight, Tonight" by The Smashing Pumpkins.) †	Billy Corgan	Non-album single	2010	
"Two Veils to Hide My Face"	Michael Angelakos	Gossamer	2012	
"Until We Can't (Let's Go)" †	Michael Angelakos; Hans Zimmer; Benny Blanco	Kindred	2015	
"Where I Come From"	Michael Angelakos	The Twilight Saga: Breaking Dawn – Part 2	2012	
"Where the Sky Hangs" †	Michael Angelakos	Kindred	2015	
"Where We Belong"	Michael Angelakos	Gossamer	2012	
"Whole Life Story"	Michael Angelakos; Benny Blanco	Kindred	2015	
