= Erato (disambiguation) =

Erato was one of the Greek Muses.

Erato may also refer to:

- Erato (mythology), name of several mythological figures
- Erato (gastropod), a genus of gastropods
- Erato (plant), a genus of plants
- Erato (band), Swedish indie pop band
- Erato (duo), Bosnian R&B duo
- Erato Records, a record label
- Erato of Armenia, an ancient queen of Armenia
- Erato Detachment, a military unit of Armenia
- 62 Erato, an asteroid
