= Erato (band) =

Swedish musical duo

- Genres: Indie pop
- Years active: 2008–present
- Labels: Playground Music Scandinavia
- Members: Petra Brohäll, Ebba Lovisa Andersson
- Past members: Amanda Wikström

Erato is a Swedish musical duo consisting of Petra Brohäll and Ebba Lovisa Andersson. Formed in 2008, they became known for their cover of "Call Your Girlfriend" by Robyn, which became a viral hit on YouTube.

In 2012, they contributed vocals to seven songs on the American indie pop band Passion Pit's album Gossamer.

Their debut album, Pictures of Pets, was released in 2014.
