= In the Valley Below =

US musical group

- Origin: Echo Park, California, United States
- Genres: Indie rock, dream pop
- Years active: 2011–present
- Labels: Bright Antenna; Capitol Records (US); Arts & Crafts (Canada); Embassy of Music (Germany); Oskar (France); Ignition Records/Oskar (UK); Sony Records (Europe); Just Music (South Africa)
- Members: Angela Gail Mattson; Jeffrey Jacob Mendel; Joshua Clair
- Past members: Jeremy Grant

In the Valley Below is an American band from Grand Rapids, Michigan that formed in Echo Park, California in 2011. The band is led by Jeffrey Jacob Mendel (vocals, guitar) and Angela Gail Mattson (vocals, keyboard). The band's first studio album, The Belt, was released in 2014, featuring the single "Peaches", which peaked at number 18 on the Billboard Alternative Songs chart in 2016. Their sophomore album and feature film The Pink Chateau was released on April 26, 2019, via Bright Antenna Records.

== History ==
=== Formation ===
Mendel and Mattson are from Memphis, Tennessee, and Muskegon, Michigan, respectively. They met in the Los Angeles music scene, and played in several local bands before starting In The Valley Below. After a trip to SXSW in Austin, Texas, they formed a new bond and decided they needed to write music together. In the Valley Below began in 2011 as a studio project, and they self released a five-song EP before the end of that year.

In the Valley Below made its US network television debut on The Late Show With David Letterman (performing their song "Peaches") on August 28, 2013, and have also appeared on Conan and The Harald Schmidt Show in Germany. The band has supported North American and European tours for Albert Hammond Jr, Tricky, White Lies, Cold War Kids, The Airborne Toxic Event, Robert DeLong, and Sir Sly. With their touring live drummer Joshua Clair, they have also performed at Reading and Leeds, Rock en Seine, Pukkelpop, The Great Escape, SXSW and Austin City Limits music festivals.

=== The Belt (2014) ===
Their debut album, The Belt, was released in different territories on different record labels around the world throughout 2013 and 2014. Written, produced and engineered by Jeffrey and Angela, the LA Weekly listed their debut album among the 10 Best Albums of 2014 by L.A. Artists. The Huffington Post named "Peaches" the #5 song of 2014, while Noisey named it their #17 track of the year 2013.

The Peaches Remix EP containing remixes by Passion Pit, Kele Okereke of Bloc Party, Dirtcaps, We Love Machines, Death by Misadventure, Omniflux and Owlle was released on June 3, 2014.

=== Elephant EP (2017) ===
After three years on the road, the band moved from California to Grand Rapids, Michigan where they have been living and recording in a 93-year-old house. Their Elephant EP, was released on July 14, 2017. Elephant features the lead single "Bloodhands (Oh My Fever)," which is inspired by the Ferguson, MO shooting of Michael Brown. When asked what Angela hopes people listening to Elephant will take away, she said "I’d like for someone to find a part of themselves in it; maybe we can get down into their emotions and make them feel a certain way – not necessarily have them think about who we are while listening to it."

=== The Pink Chateau (2019) ===
The band's sophomore album and movie, The Pink Chateau was released on April 26, 2019, via Bright Antenna Records. Like their debut, all songs were written, produced and recorded by the duo except the album's single "Rise" which was produced and mixed by TV on the Radio band member and producer Dave Sitek.

On March 28, 2019, the band hosted 2 private events in Los Angeles which they called The Pink Chateau, an audio immersive, multi-sensory music experience. Guests were guided and wandered through a mansion wearing wireless headphones exploring different rooms where actors lived out erotic fantasies depicted from the movie. The new album was broadcast through the headphones along with spoken word directions and erotic tales from Angela. The end of the experience crescendoed into the band being revealed and performing live over the headphones in a hidden ballroom.

To promote the movie and album, the band screened the movie around the United States primarily at Alamo Draft House Cinemas performing the score live over wireless headphones. The movie premiered at the Newport Beach Film Festival on April 26, 2019.

Brooklyn Vegan calls the movie "A dreamlike diorama of interconnected musical vignettes inspired by vintage French erotica and the faded colors of 1970s films. Each song on The Pink Chateau serves as a portal through which the film's enigmatic female protagonist confronts her most deep-seated desires." While PopMatters wrote "Perhaps the most intriguing project of the year thus far that melds alternative rock-pop music with risk-taking movie making" and Art Matters called it "a visual album of special magnificence. An Alice in Wonderland of queer female please and beauty."

The album cover depicts a simple drawing of a flower, while the back cover reveals the flower as the genitalia of a woman. The band released limited edition "Merkin" vinyl covers containing different colored furry triangle patches.

== Discography ==
=== Studio albums ===
- The Belt (2014)
- The Pink Chateau (2019)
- The Black Moon (2024)

=== Extended plays ===
- In the Valley Below (2011)
- Man Girl (2014)
- Peaches Remixes (2014)
- Elephant (2017)

=== Singles ===
- "Peaches" (2013)
- "Neverminders" (2014)
- "Peaches" (2014, re-release) #18 Billboard Alternative Songs, #33 Billboard Rock Songs
- "Bloodhands (Oh My Fever)" (2017)
- "Rise" (2019)

=== Feature film ===
- The Pink Chateau (2019)
