= Lifted Up (1985) =

Single by Passion Pit

from the album Kindred
- Released: February 16, 2015
- Genre: Indie pop; synthpop
- Length: 4:23
- Label: Columbia
- Songwriters: Michael Angelakos; Benjamin Levin
- Producers: Chris Zane; Benny Blanco; Michael Angelakos; Alex Aldi

Passion Pit singles chronology
"Cry Like a Ghost" (2013)	"Lifted Up (1985)" (2015)	"Where the Sky Hangs" (2015)

"Lifted Up (1985)" is a song by American indietronica band Passion Pit from their third studio album, Kindred (2015). The song was written and produced by the band's frontman Michael Angelakos as well as Benjamin Levin (known as Benny Blanco) with Chris Zane and Alex Aldi providing co-production. It was released as the lead single from the album in February 2015. The song was later included in Konami's Pro Evolution Soccer 2016 as part of the game's soundtrack.

== Background ==
Michael Angelakos wrote the song in gratitude for his wife for coming to him "at a point in my life where I really was pretty lost." She was born in 1985.

== Music video ==
The song's music video features Angelakos alongside a crowd of partiers. For each verse, the crowd gets less and less chaotic; starting with white strobing lights as the partiers toss Angelakos around and make him feel claustrophobic. During the second verse, calmer, fazing blue lights fill the party with Angelakos looking more comfortable, but still slightly awkward around the partiers. During the final verse, the lights are orange and everyone is standing still with only Angelakos dancing happily in an almost euphoric trance. As the final chorus plays, everyone begins dancing as Angelakos is literally "lifted off the ground" and above the partiers. The video, and song, end with everything cutting to black.

== Formats and track listings ==
Digital download

1. "Lifted Up (1985)" – 4:23

== Charts ==
Chart (2015)	Peak position
CIS Airplay (TopHit)	196
US Hot Rock & Alternative Songs (Billboard)	31
US Alternative Airplay (Billboard)	26
US Rock & Alternative Airplay (Billboard)	33
