= World of Music (Mary O'Hara album) =

Studio album by Mary O'Hara
- Released: 1989
- Genre: Folk music
- Label: Music for Pleasure 5870

Mary O'Hara chronology
Celebration of Love (1989)	World of Music (1989)	Mary O'Hara, Song for Ireland (1993)

World of Music is a 1989 album by Mary O'Hara for EMI, as MFP 5870. The album is O'Hara's only 'around-the-world' survey of traditional songs, and contains O'Hara's first studio recordings of songs other than in English and Gaelic, including two Greek songs popularised by Nana Mouskouri, and an arrangement of Carl Orff's Latin-language "In Trutina", the full orchestral version of which O'Hara had selected as one of her Desert Island Discs for the BBC in 1981.

== Track listing ==
1. "Minstrel of the Dawn" (Gordon Lightfoot)
2. "A song for Ireland" (Phil Colclough)
3. "À la claire fontaine" ("By the clear fountain", traditional French Canadian, arr. O'Hara)
4. "Zavara-katra-nemia" (Ζάβαρα-κάτρα-νέμια from Epichirisis Apollon by Yannis Markopoulos)
5. "Canción de cuna para dormir a un negrito" (Xavier Montsalvatge)
6. "Take it on the chin" (from Me and My Girl music by Noel Gay, lyrics by Douglas Furber and L. Arthur Rose)
7. "In Trutina" (Carl Orff)
8. "Unusual Way" (from Nine by Maury Yeston)
9. "Wiegenlied" (D 498 Schubert)
10. "Tragoudo Tragoudo" (Τραγουδώ τραγουδώ, Yannis Markopoulos)
11. "A song for the mira" (Allister MacGillivray)
12. "Oceans Away" (Phillip Goodhand-Tait)
13. "Minstrel Boy" (Thomas Moore 1779–1852, trad. arr. O'Hara)
14. "All through the night" (Welsh "Ar Hyd y Nos", arr. Alan Simmons)
