= Constant Conversations =

Single by Passion Pit

from the album Gossamer
- Released: July 9, 2012
- Recorded: 2012; Gigantic Studios
- Genre: Electropop; indietronica; alternative R&B
- Length: 4:23
- Label: Columbia
- Songwriter(s): Michael Angelakos
- Producer(s): Michael Angelakos, Chris Zane

Passion Pit singles chronology
| "I'll Be Alright" (2012) | "Constant Conversations" (2012) | "Carried Away" (2012) |

"Constant Conversations" is a song by American indietronica band Passion Pit from their second studio album, Gossamer (2012). The song was written and produced by the band's frontman Michael Angelakos. It was released as the third single from the album in July 2012. Constant Conversations was reviewed and featured as "best new track" by Pitchfork. It was released with the review as streamed content.

Constant Conversations was chosen at #63 in "The Top 100 tracks by 2012", hosted by Pitchfork.

On February 28, 2013, American rapper Juicy J officially remixed Constant Conversations. The remix still features the vocals of Angelakos, however the song structure was rearranged.

== Background ==
Frontman and songwriter Michael Angelakos told NME about this song: "That's a song about alcohol-induced paranoia, and how that affects people around you, just watching those crumbling relationships." Swedish female vocal trio Erato add melodic layers to Angelakos' vocals on this and other Gossamer songs. The Passion Pit frontman first came across the girl group after his fiancée sent him a link of them singing Robyn's "Call Your Girlfriend." "It was amazing," he told Pitchfork. "We got in contact with them, and they had never done anything like this; they were totally new to it. They pumped through a bunch of things in three days, including the intro to the album."

== Music video ==
The song's music video was directed by Dori Oskowitz (Ke$ha's "Take It Off") and features actor and director Peter Bogdanovich. Model and actor Lio Tipton (Crazy, Stupid, Love), fashion designer and actress Taryn Manning (Crossroads) and actor Roger Guenveur Smith (American Gangster) also make appearances in the clip. The music video was uploaded by 'pitchforktv' on YouTube with the following description: "This vulnerable, sensual clip for the Gossamer single features Peter Bogdanovich, Analeigh Tipton, Taryn Manning, David Dastmalchian, Tobias Jelinek, Eugenia Kuzmina and Roger Guenveur Smith."

== Formats and track listings ==
Digital download

An extended play of the same name was released, featuring three songs.

A stripped version of Constant Conversations was included in the Japan deluxe edition of Constant Conversations. Although not available for purchase, it was uploaded onto YouTube.

American rapper Juicy J officially remixed Constant Conversations. The remix still features the vocals of Angelakos, however the song structure was rearranged.
