= Tremendous Sea of Love =

Studio album by Passion Pit
- Released: March 24, 2017 (YouTube); July 28, 2017 (official)
- Length: 35:25
- Label: Wishart Group Recordings
- Producer: Michael Angelakos

Passion Pit chronology
Kindred (2015)	Tremendous Sea of Love (2017)

Tremendous Sea of Love is the fourth studio album by Passion Pit, self-released on YouTube on March 24, 2017, and later officially released on July 28, 2017. Frontman and producer Michael Angelakos expressed a desire to embrace authenticity and rawness with the album in interviews. It was positively received by critics, who noted this intentional rawness and a more mature overall sound compared to the band's previous album, Kindred.

== Background and production ==
Passion Pit frontman Michael Angelakos had expressed a desire in a late 2015 interview to make his music more authentic, and a more accurate reflection of his own life. During February and March 2017, he uploaded self-released ten songs forming Tremendous Sea of Love to a YouTube channel for The Wishart Group, Angelakos's company that offers legal and healthcare support for musicians. The songs have since been taken down, but Angelakos announced that he would give a downloadable copy of the album for free to anyone who retweeted neuroscientist Michael F. Wells' tweet on the importance of science and research.

Angelakos posted a now-deleted reflection on the album to Twitter, part of which stated that "today to edit, to revise, is to propagate a culture […] that is scared of acknowledging the truth and that is saying YOU ARE NOT GOOD ENOUGH".

On July 12, an official release date was set for July 28 on all streaming services.

== Critical reception ==
Professional ratings
Review scores
Source	Rating
Consequence of Sound	B
Newsday	B+
Pitchfork	7.5/10

Tremendous Sea of Love was positively received by critics. Ian Cohen of Pitchfork praised the album's rawness, and said it was a reaction to its predecessor, Kindred. The New Zealand Herald's George Fenwick also praised the album's "startling clarity" and "rawness", further stating that though some elements felt "disparate and scattered", that this may have been intentional on Angelakos's part to challenge established industry norms. Consequence of Sound's Tyler Clark argued that the album was a "return to [the] no-stakes music-making" of Angelakos's earlier records, such as Chunk of Change. Clark also called the album a "tremendously personal sonic journal".

The album also received reactions prior to its release on streaming. Vox Magazine said the album was a "far cry from a marketable project", but said it had a more polished and mature sound than Kindred. They further commented that the band appeared to be "prioritising artistry over commercial success" by self-publishing the songs to YouTube.

== Track listing ==
All tracks are written by Michael Angelakos.

No.	Title	Length
1.	"Moonbeam"	1:17
2.	"Somewhere Up There"	6:14
3.	"Hey K"	4:03
4.	"To the Other Side"	3:11
5.	"Tremendous Sea of Love"	4:04
6.	"I'm Perfect"	2:16
7.	"You Have the Right"	3:06
8.	"Inner Dialogue"	2:24
9.	"Undertow"	4:23
10.	"For Sondra (It Means the World to Me)"	4:34
