= Richard Selig =

American poet (1929–1957)

Richard Selig (1929–1957), was an American poet. Born in 1929, Selig attended the University of Washington and later Magdalen College, Oxford as a Rhodes Scholar. He was introduced to Irish soprano and harpist Mary O'Hara by Irish poet Thomas Kinsella. The couple married in 1956, and Selig moved to the United States with O'Hara.

Selig's career was cut short by Hodgkin's disease, and he died on 14 October 1957, just 15 months after his marriage. A volume of his poems was published posthumously in 1962 by the Dolmen Press in Dublin, Ireland.

Selig's legacy is intertwined with that of his wife, Mary O'Hara, whose own career as a musician was influenced by their time together. O'Hara continued to tour and record for four years after Selig's death, before taking a twelve-year hiatus from her musical career.

== Poetry career ==
Richard Selig's poetry, though not widely known, has been celebrated for its depth and beauty. Some of his notable poems include:

- A Small Request
- Reflection
- Count the Stars
- The Presence is Remembered
- Songs in Anticipation
