= Cherry Bing =

American ska/rock band

- Origin: Buffalo, New York, U.S.
- Genres: Ska, rock
- Years active: 1999–2005
- Label: BFT Tapehouse
- Spinoffs: Passion Pit, Cute is What We Aim For
- Past members: Michael Angelakos; Andrew DeSabio; William Glazier; Jeff Poleon; Adam Schroeder; Maxwell Scott; Derek Kettner; Sam Korotkin; Jeffery Czum; Shaant Hacikyan

Cherry Bing were an American ska and rock band formed in Buffalo, New York, United States. They existed between 1999 and 2005.

The group was originally conceived by members Michael Angelakos, Adam Schroeder, Maxwell Scott and Jeff Poleon and Will Glazier while attending Amherst + Williamsville Middle School. Brass members William Glazier, Derek Kettner, Sam Korotkin and Andrew DeSabio were added soon after.

The band produced their first album The Buffalo Superheroes at BTF Tapehouse in 2001. The songs "Cool Amherst Party" and "Call from China" achieved internet success later that year by cracking the top 50 played tracks on MP3.com.

The band's second album was titled 60 Hertz Signals EP and included the tracks "Marilynn, 2 O'Clock and Still Without You, Can't Fight, Flirting Penguins Raging Eskimos, and The Yearbook." Singer/Guitarist/Songwriter Michael Angelakos parted with the group shortly after recording the album, but did make a few guest reappearances with the band, most notably at Amherst High School SpringFest in 2003.

Cherry Bing added guitarist Jeffery Czum and singer Shaant Hacikyan (both of whom later became members of Cute Is What We Aim For) in the spring of 2003. Their respective first performances came at the aforementioned Amherst SpringFest and the Kenmore High School SpringFest.

After returning from a 5-date east coast mini-tour in the late summer of 2003, Andrew Desabio officially parted with the band.

Cherry Bing released the Its Your Day Demo and the In A Language All Our Own EP under their new self-coined genre, "Rock with Horns." Notable tracks include "Stood Here Once," "Band-Aid Trophy Case," and the re-release of "Hate."

The band was featured in the NeXt section of the Buffalo News in 2004 for winning local radio station Kiss 98.5's "Battle of the Bands."

Cherry Bing took the stage at the Van's Warped Tour in August 2004.

October 31, 2004 marked the release of the band's final recording, and final performance, at the now-defunct Showplace Theatre on Grant Street in Buffalo, NY.

The group had a tumultuous break up, as documented on several YouTube shorts and in a famed SPIN magazine article published at the time, stating the core group wanting to continue and offered a record contract as a whole from Drive-Thru Records at time, but instead, Shaant and Jeff seeking an alternative deal with Fueled by Ramen, ultimately disbanded the group at this time.

Years before forming Passion Pit and becoming a purveyor of gossamer synthpop, frontman Michael Angelakos was embedded in a much different music scene: ska. In 1999, while attending high school in Buffalo, New York, he founded a raucous ska band called Cherry Bing. Angelakos put out two releases with the group and played shows around the Upstate New York area before leaving to pursue other projects in 2002 (they would later join the Warped Tour without him in 2004).

Though a short-lived venture, footage of his time with Cherry Bing exists, giving fans a window into his pre-Passion Pit days, and shows just how music-oriented he was — no matter the genre — so early on. Cherry Bing performed a gig at Amherst High School in 2002.

Will Glazier (Willdabeast, Grand Alliance Music), trumpet player and record label owner, spent years immersing himself in the ska-punk aesthetics of third wave Buffalo music as the founder of Cherry Bing. He later toured the nation as one of the founding member of Michal Menert Big Band and the Pretty Fantastics and Willdabeast. Glazier established Grand Alliance Music record label in 2024.

== Discography ==
- The Buffalo Superheroes, BFT Tapehouse, 2001
- The 60 Hertz EP, BFT Tapehouse, 2002
- Stood Here Once Demo, BFT Tapehouse, 2003
- In A Language All Our Own, Chameleon West, 2004

== Band members ==
- Michael Angelakos, vocals/guitar 1999-2002 (Passion Pit)
- Andrew DeSabio, saxophone 1999-2003
- William Glazier, trumpet/background vocals 1999-2005 (Willdabeast)
- Jeff Poleon, vocals 1999-2001
- Adam Schroeder, drums/vocals 1999-2005
- Maxwell Scott, bass 1999-2005
- Derek Kettner, trombone 2001-2004
- Sam Korotkin, trombone 2005
- Jeffery Czum, guitar/vocals 2003-2005
- Shaant Hacikyan, vocals 2003-2005
