= The Belt (album) =

Studio album by In The Valley Below
- Released: August 25, 2014
- Recorded: Echo Park, California
- Genre: Indie pop; dream pop; synth pop
- Length: 48:18
- Label: Capitol
- Producer: In The Valley Below

In The Valley Below chronology
The Belt (2014)	The Pink Chateau (2019)

Singles from The Belt
- 1. "Peaches" Released: July 05, 2013

The Belt is the debut studio album by American band In The Valley Below. The album was recorded in the band's home studio where they handled all engineering and production and mixing on two tracks, with the others being mixed by respected producers such as Dave Sardy who has worked with bands such as Oasis. The band found success with the single Peaches, which peaked at number 18 on the Billboard Alternative Songs chart in 2016.

== Themes and composition ==
Pop Matters described the album's sound as a mix of 1980's synth pop, Fleetwood Mac, and Depeche Mode.

== Reception ==
The album was generally well received by critics. Pop Matters praised the vocal interplay between Angela Gail Mattson and Jeffrey Jacob Mendel, concluding that "the most striking and amazing quality about In the Valley Below is their singing. Sometimes the duo shares harmony, and sometimes they trade off lines to astonishing effect. This is the line that runs throughout the disc, and it becomes clear that not only does this outfit have a passion for making music, but they also can carefully construct a call-and-response aesthetic that is quite pleasing."

== Track listing ==
All tracks are written by In The Valley Below.

No.	Title	Length
1.	"Peaches"	4:45
2.	"Neverminders"	3:41
3.	"Last Soul"	4:30
4.	"Hymnal"	4:26
5.	"Stand Up"	4:43
6.	"Dove Season"	4:52
7.	"Take Me Back"	4:20
8.	"Searching For a Devil"	4:12
9.	"Lover"	4:55
10.	"Medicine Pocket"
11.	"Palm Tree Fire" (US-only track)	3:47
12.	"King Tide"	4:01
Total length:		48:18

== Personnel ==
- Angela Gail Mattson – vocals, synthesizers, production & engineering (all tracks); mixing (2 tracks)
- Jeffrey Jacob Mendel – vocals, guitars, production & engineering (all tracks) mixing (2 tracks)
- John Congleton – mixing
- Dave Sardy – mixing
- Lasse Marten - mixing
