= Constant Conversations (EP) =

EP by Passion Pit
- Released: 24 September 2013
- Genre: Indie electronic; electro house; synthpop
- Length: 10:21
- Label: Frenchkiss, Columbia

Passion Pit chronology
Gossamer (2012)	Constant Conversations (2013)	Kindred (2015)

Constant Conversations is an extended play released by Passion Pit on September 24, 2013.

== Track listing ==
All tracks are written by Michael Angelakos, except where noted.

No.	Title	Length
1.	"Constant Conversations" (Alternative Version)	3:38
2.	"Ruin Your Day"	2:23
3.	"Carried Away" (Dillon Francis Remix)	4:19
4.	"Carry On" (Jeff Bhasker, Nate Ruess, Andrew Dost, Jack Antonoff)	4:05
