= Gossamer (album) =

Studio album by Passion Pit
- Released: July 20, 2012
- Recorded: 2011
- Studio: Gigantic, New York City
- Genre: Electropop; synth-pop; dance-rock
- Length: 47:28
- Label: Columbia; Frenchkiss
- Producer: Chris Zane; Michael Angelakos

Passion Pit chronology
Manners (2009)	Gossamer (2012)	Constant Conversations (2013)

Singles from Gossamer
- 1. "Take a Walk" Released: May 8, 2012; 2. "I'll Be Alright" Released: June 12, 2012; 3. "Constant Conversations" Released: July 9, 2012; 4. "Carried Away" Released: January 8, 2013

Gossamer is the second studio album by American electropop band Passion Pit. It was released on July 20, 2012, by Columbia and Frenchkiss Records. Recorded in 2011 in Los Angeles and New York City, the album was produced by Chris Zane, who also produced the band's debut album Manners (2009), and lead singer Michael Angelakos.

In an August 2010 interview with NME, Angelakos stated that work had already begun on the follow-up to Manners, and that the band intended to release the album in the spring of 2011. "It's gonna be a really fantastic, exciting, beautiful, gorgeous record. An absolutely beautiful record. I'm so excited", he said. The album's title and release date were announced on April 24, 2012.

== Singles ==
"Take a Walk" was released as the album's lead single on May 8, 2012. The accompanying music video, directed by David Wilson and supported by The Creators Project, was shot in Philadelphia from the perspective of a bouncing ball using helicam technology.

Second single "I'll Be Alright" was released on June 12, 2012. It received exposure after being featured on the video game FIFA 13, and received "Best New Track" status by Pitchfork.

"Constant Conversations" was released as the album's third single on July 9, 2012, and was featured as "Best New Track" by Pitchfork. An official remix of "Constant Conversations" by American rapper Juicy J premiered on February 28, 2013.

"Carried Away" was released on January 8, 2013, as the fourth and final single from the album. The music video, directed by Brewer, was released on February 14, 2013, and featured American actress Sophia Bush.

A music video for promotional single "Cry Like a Ghost", directed by Daniel Kwan and Daniel Scheinert, was released on March 27, 2013.

== Critical reception ==
Professional ratings
Aggregate scores
Source	Rating
Metacritic	76/100
Review scores
Source	Rating
AllMusic	4/5 stars
The A.V. Club	A−
Chicago Tribune	3.5/4 stars
Clash	6/10
Drowned in Sound	8/10
The Guardian	4/5 stars
NME	8/10
Pitchfork	8.4/10
Rolling Stone	3.5/5 stars
Slant Magazine	2.5/5 stars

Gossamer received generally positive reviews from music critics. At Metacritic, which assigns a normalized rating out of 100 to reviews from mainstream publications, the album received an average score of 76, based on 36 reviews. The Guardian's Caroline Sullivan commented that Angelakos' "ability to create sunlight and sparkle with an arsenal of sequencers and computers remains consistent, and is the album's real point of interest." Russell Warfield of Drowned in Sound opined that "while retaining [the] overactive production style, Angelakos manages to make Gossamer feel more effortlessly human, more like the self-realised artistic vision of an individual than Manners ever came close to being." Pitchfork's Ian Cohen described Gossamer as "an overwhelming album about being overwhelmed, a bold and ultimately stunning torrent of maximalist musical ideas, repressed anger, and unchecked anxiety." The A.V. Club's Ryan Reed found Gossamer to be "more elegant than its predecessor" and concluded, "Throughout Gossamer, Angelakos sounds broken and confused, wrestling with his demons, cage match-style, on an oversized stage [...] But despite the emphasis on struggle, Gossamer couldn't sound more assured."

James Christopher Monger of AllMusic stated, "Though the environment that birthed the appropriately titled Gossamer may be a bummer, the end product is winningly majestic as it is obviously spun by the most malevolent of spiders." John Calvert of NME wrote that "one quibble is that Gossamer never really comes down off its Haribo rush, which gets exhausting. That said, when they do ease up, as on the boudoir-funk 'Constant Conversations', it resembles the two-a-penny synthpop that clogs the blogosphere." Rolling Stone's Jon Dolan expressed that the album is "roomier and more varied" than its predecessor Manners. Chicago Tribune writer Greg Kot viewed Gossamer as "a soul record disguised as buoyant, uptempo dance-pop." Benjamin Aspray of PopMatters felt that the album is "as scrappy, outsize, and infectious as anyone could hope for, and as shrill and cloying as anyone could expect." Sam Walker-Smart of Clash called the album "a colorful twelve-track ode to joy", but noted that "the album's main fault [is] how every track merges into one big goofy smile-a-thon while never delivering a number as exciting as previous hit 'Sleepyhead'." Slant Magazine's Kevin Liedel critiqued that "much of Gossamer plays as though it were constructed (however poorly) from ['Sleepyhead''s] template [...] The band, in effect, seems to be desperately chasing a winning blueprint", adding that apart from the song "Constant Conversations", Gossamer is "true to its name: colorless and precariously thin, with precious few bright spots."

=== Accolades ===
The album was listed at number 18 on Under the Radar's "Top 100 Albums of 2012", and the magazine commented, "Fueled by the confession, guilt, and cathartic honesty of frontman Michael Angelakos, [Gossamer] is one of the most lyrically painful records of 2012. It also happens to be one of the year's most musically euphoric, stacked to the brim with electro-pop." Gigwise named Gossamer the 20th best album of 2012 and opined, "Rarely has an album been better named; Gossamer is delicate, light, and oh so finely spun. It's despondent while having no time for despondency; sadness lurks underneath but only to remind us that there are so many other things we could be doing, emotions we could be feeling."

Rolling Stone placed the album at number 39 on its "50 Best Albums of 2012" list and stated it is "shinier, busier and even more hysterically earnest than their debut: Angelakos' falsetto ricochets like laser light, chipper gals coo smoke-machine choruses amid hot electronics and cool string arrangements." PopMatters ranked it at number 66 on its list of "The 75 Best Albums of 2012", writing that the album's title "speaks volumes about the contents, a thinly veiled peek into the psyche of singer/songwriter Michael Angelokos."

== Commercial performance ==
Gossamer debuted at number four on the Billboard 200 with first-week sales of 37,000 copies, a career best. The album had sold 216,000 copies in the United States as of April 2015.

In the United Kingdom, the album sold 2,444 copies to enter the UK Albums Chart at number 56, one position lower than its predecessor, Manners.

== Track listing ==
All tracks are written by Michael Angelakos.

No.	Title	Length
1.	"Take a Walk"	4:25
2.	"I'll Be Alright"	4:23
3.	"Carried Away"	3:42
4.	"Constant Conversations"	3:56
5.	"Mirrored Sea"	4:06
6.	"Cry Like a Ghost"	4:23
7.	"On My Way"	3:47
8.	"Hideaway"	3:51
9.	"Two Veils to Hide My Face"	0:34
10.	"Love Is Greed"	4:20
11.	"It's Not My Fault, I'm Happy"	5:06
12.	"Where We Belong"	5:00

iTunes Store pre-order bonus track
No.	Title	Length
13.	"American Blood"	4:24

Japanese edition bonus tracks
No.	Title	Length
13.	"Almost There"	4:17
14.	"American Blood"	4:24
15.	"Constant Conversations" (stripped)	4:19
16.	"Take a Walk" (Burns' SFTCR version)	4:10
17.	"Take a Walk" (☆Taku Takahashi & El Poco Maro Remix)	6:00

== Personnel ==
Credits adapted from the liner notes of Gossamer.

=== Musicians ===
- Michael Angelakos – all vocals, instruments, programming
- Chris Zane – drums, percussion (tracks 1–8, 10–12)
- Nico Muhly – celeste, piano, string arrangements (tracks 2, 7, 10, 12)
- Caleb Burhans, Max Mandel, Nadia Sirota – violin (tracks 2, 7, 10, 12)
- Anna Elashvili, Keats Dieffenbach, Rob Moose, Yuki Numata – viola (tracks 2, 7, 10, 12)
- Clarice Jensen – cello (tracks 2, 10, 12); flute (track 7)
- Eric Lamb – flute (tracks 2, 7, 10, 12)
- Ebba Lovisa Andersson, Petra Brohäll, Amanda Wikström – additional vocals (tracks 3–5, 7–12)
- Jon Natchez – baritone saxophone, tenor saxophone (tracks 7, 10)
- Kelly Pratt – trumpet, trombone (tracks 7, 10)
- Andrew Esposito – aux percussion, additional programming (tracks 10, 11)
- Diplo – additional programming (track 12)
- Mike Dunkley – additional programming (track 12)

=== Technical ===
- Chris Zane – production, mixing
- Michael Angelakos – production
- Alex Aldi – engineering, additional production, mixing
- Greg Calbi – mastering at Sterling Sound, New York City

=== Artwork ===
- Anita Marisa Boriboon – art direction, design
- Mark Borthwick – photography

== Charts ==
=== Weekly charts ===
Chart (2012)	Peak position
Australian Albums (ARIA)	12
Belgian Albums (Ultratop Flanders)	149
Canadian Albums (Billboard)	17
Irish Albums (IRMA)	33
New Zealand Albums (RMNZ)	31
Scottish Albums (OCC)	77
UK Albums (OCC)	56
US Billboard 200	4
US Top Alternative Albums (Billboard)	2
US Top Rock Albums (Billboard)	2

=== Year-end charts ===
Chart (2012)	Position
US Top Alternative Albums (Billboard)	42
US Top Rock Albums (Billboard)	63

== Certifications ==
Region	Certification	Certified units/sales
United States (RIAA)	Gold	500,000^{‡}
^{‡} Sales+streaming figures based on certification alone.

== Release history ==
Region	Date	Label	Ref.
Australia	July 20, 2012	Sony	
Germany	July 20, 2012	Sony	
United Kingdom	July 23, 2012	Columbia; Frenchkiss	
United States	July 24, 2012	Columbia; Frenchkiss	
Japan	August 8, 2012	Sony	
