= Take a Walk =

2012 single by Passion Pit

Single by Passion Pit

from the album Gossamer
- Released: May 8, 2012
- Recorded: 2011; Gigantic Studios; N.Y.C
- Genre: Indie pop; synth-pop
- Length: 4:25 (album version); 3:59 (radio edit); 4:10 (music video edit)
- Label: Columbia
- Songwriter: Michael Angelakos
- Producers: Michael Angelakos; Chris Zane

Passion Pit singles chronology
"Little Secrets" (2009)	"Take a Walk" (2012)	"I'll Be Alright" (2012)

"Take a Walk" is a song by American indietronica band Passion Pit from their second studio album, Gossamer (2012). The song was written and produced by the band's frontman Michael Angelakos, with Chris Zane providing co-production. It was released as the lead single from the album in May 2012.

Rolling Stone named "Take a Walk" the third-best song of 2012.

== Background ==
"Take a Walk" was written by Michael Angelakos, lead singer and keyboardist of Passion Pit. The song's lyrical content depicts a businessman burdened by financial troubles. According to Angelakos, each verse of the song is based upon one of the men in his family who immigrated to the United States, and depicts a point in each of their lives in America.

== In popular culture ==
- The song appeared in a commercial by fast food chain Taco Bell advertising their Doritos Locos. Reception by the band's fan base to the song's use in the commercial was mixed. Angelakos defended the use of "Take a Walk" in the commercial, explaining: "It's not about promoting celebrities or giant corporations or anything like that. It’s just airtime…It's an amazing opportunity. And, honestly, you take what you can get. I say no to about 90 percent of the offers, but we just want people to hear the music at the end of the day."

== Music video ==
The music video for "Take a Walk" was directed by David Wilson in collaboration with the Creators Project. The video is seen from the perspective of a ball as it bounces across several locations in and around Philadelphia, including a suburban neighborhood (Plymouth Meeting), farmland (Maple Acres Farm), Fairmount Park, and various parts of the city. Advanced helicam technology was utilized in the production of the video in order to achieve the effect.

== Formats and track listings ==
Digital download

1. "Take a Walk" – 4:23

Digital download – remix single

1. "Take a Walk" (The M Machine Remix) – 4:23

== Charts ==
=== Weekly charts ===
Chart (2012–2013)	Peak position
Belgium (Ultratip Bubbling Under Flanders)	27
Canada Hot 100 (Billboard)	97
France (SNEP)	84
Japan Hot 100 (Billboard)	36
US Billboard Hot 100	84
US Hot Rock & Alternative Songs (Billboard)	9
US Adult Alternative Airplay (Billboard)	22
US Adult Pop Airplay (Billboard)	24
US Alternative Airplay (Billboard)	5
US Rock & Alternative Airplay (Billboard)	7

=== Year-end charts ===
Chart (2012)	Position
US Hot Rock Songs (Billboard)	34
US Alternative Songs (Billboard)	16

Chart (2013)	Position
US Hot Rock Songs (Billboard)	27
US Alternative Songs (Billboard)	28
US Rock Airplay (Billboard)	25

== Certifications ==
Region	Certification	Certified units/sales
New Zealand (RMNZ)	Gold	15,000^{‡}
United Kingdom (BPI)	Silver	200,000^{‡}
United States (RIAA)	2× Platinum	2,000,000^{‡}
^{‡} Sales+streaming figures based on certification alone.
