= Manners (album) =

Studio album by Passion Pit
- Released: May 15, 2009
- Recorded: November–December 2008: January 16, 2009 (PS22 Chorus overdubs)
- Studios: Gigantic, New York City
- Genres: Electropop; synth-pop; electro-indie
- Length: 45:33
- Label: Frenchkiss
- Producer: Chris Zane

Passion Pit chronology
| Chunk of Change (2008) | Manners (2009) | Gossamer (2012) |

Alternative cover
- Extended edition cover

Singles from Manners
- 1. "The Reeling" Released: May 11, 2009; 2. "To Kingdom Come" Released: August 24, 2009; 3. "Little Secrets" Released: December 14, 2009

Manners is the debut studio album by American electropop band Passion Pit. It was released on May 15, 2009, by Frenchkiss Records. "The Reeling" was released as the album's lead single on May 11, 2009, and its music video was premiered on YouTube on April 21, 2009. A second single, "To Kingdom Come", was released in August 2009, followed by "Little Secrets" in December 2009. "Sleepyhead" was originally included on Passion Pit's first EP, Chunk of Change (2008), but was mastered for inclusion on Manners (none of the tracks on the EP were mastered). As of December 2009, the album had sold 82,000 copies in the United States, according to Nielsen SoundScan.

A deluxe edition of the album was released on April 13, 2010, containing three bonus tracks and new artwork. The bonus tracks included stripped-down versions of "Moth's Wings" and "Sleepyhead" and a cover of the Cranberries' 1992 song "Dreams", which the band played live on their 2010 world tour.

To celebrate the 10th anniversary of Manners, Passion Pit embarked on an 18-date North American tour in 2019, which began on April 30 in Tempe, Arizona, and concluded on May 25 in Washington, D.C.

== Critical reception ==
Professional ratings
Aggregate scores
| Source | Rating |
|---|---|
| AnyDecentMusic? | 7.7/10 |
| Metacritic | 76/100 |
Review scores
| Source | Rating |
| AllMusic | 4/5 stars |
| The A.V. Club | C+ |
| The Daily Telegraph | 4/5 stars |
| Entertainment Weekly | B |
| The Guardian | 4/5 stars |
| The Irish Times | 4/5 stars |
| NME | 7/10 |
| Pitchfork | 8.1/10 |
| Rolling Stone | 4/5 stars |
| Spin | 6/10 |

Manners received generally positive reviews from music critics. At Metacritic, which assigns a normalized rating out of 100 to reviews from mainstream publications, the album received an average score of 76, based on 27 reviews. Mike Diver of Clash scored the album nine out of ten, writing, "At its most adventurous, Manners sounds like little else—a pop record that exists in a world of its own, carving a subgenre niche which only fits their expansive, tonally decadent material." Nick Marino of Paste stated that "[n]ot every song is perfect, but perfection is boring. What we need in these weary times—and what Passion Pit brings—is exuberance. Manners delivers the elusive feeling that everything will be alright. Or, just maybe, that everything already is." Pitchfork's Ian Cohen viewed Manners as "the sort of heart-to-heart populist record that's every bit as sincere as it is infectious—though Angelakos sings in a manner rarely heard outside of a shower with unpredictable temperature control, it feels symbolic of a band that's completely unashamed, not shameless, in its pursuit of a human connection." In a review for Rolling Stone, Will Hermes described the album as "a shiny bouquet of synth-pop roses, with perfumed Eighties keyboard whooshes and modern stutter beats crooking a finger toward the dance floor", adding that "what makes the record are [Angelakos'] loose beats, shamelessly fruity melodies and breathless little-boy vocals, all pushing skyward."

AllMusic editor Tim Sendra expressed that the album "could have been a total clustercrash of influences and sounds that ended up sounding hollow and pointless. Instead, thanks to the meticulous production values, the insane catchiness of the hooks, and the pure and true emotional underpinnings below all the gloss, the album is a total success of both sound and vision." The Guardian's Paul MacInnes noted that while Angelakos' "euphoric mix of pop both electronic and melodic" is not "entirely unfamiliar", "the consistency with which various elements are blended suggests an artist with his own vision—signature details being crashing percussion left high in the mix and, even higher, Angelakos's piercing falsetto." MacInnes continued, "Perhaps not as striking as it might have seemed 18 months ago, but still a debut album of distinction." Matthew Cole of Slant Magazine opined, "Ironically enough for an album called Manners, its biggest problem is that the band sometimes comes on too strong—a risk for anyone trying to execute lush, hyperactive pop with good taste." He concluded that "while Manners would make a perfect soundtrack to any summer, you'll want to keep the best cuts around for far longer."

PopMatters critic Matthew Fiander praised Manners as "big, ambitious, bursting-at-the-seams electro-pop brilliance", writing that the album "makes you want to dance, and it gets it hooks deep into, so much so that you might be humming the melodies to these songs mindlessly, before you even realize they're Passion Pit." Entertainment Weekly's Jeremy Medina claimed that although "disorienting", the album "never lacks energy", adding that "while the midtempo tunes often venture into cheesy '80s-pop territory, the album's dense sound rewards repeat listens." Louise Brailey of NME commented that "while they do dip into an Avalanches-esque sample-based sonic palette, most of Manners paints with much broader, primary-coloured strokes." Still, Brailey believed that "[t]here are times when the album feels strangely medicated; the positivity, when heaped upon the listener in brutal doses, makes you feel trapped in one of those American self-help groups." Paul Caine of The A.V. Club felt that the album "attempts to synthesize Michael Angelakos' natural talent for dance music with more straightforward, heart-on-sleeve rock, but can't quite commit to either."

== Track listing ==
All tracks are written by Michael Angelakos, except where noted.

| No. | Title | Writer(s) | Length |
|---|---|---|---|
| 1. | "Make Light" | | 4:56 |
| 2. | "Little Secrets" | | 3:59 |
| 3. | "Moth's Wings" | | 4:16 |
| 4. | "The Reeling" | | 4:48 |
| 5. | "Eyes as Candles" | | 4:03 |
| 6. | "Swimming in the Flood" | | 4:59 |
| 7. | "Folds in Your Hands" | | 3:39 |
| 8. | "To Kingdom Come" | | 4:07 |
| 9. | "Sleepyhead" | Angelakos; Mary O'Hara | 2:55 |
| 10. | "Let Your Love Grow Tall" | | 3:32 |
| 11. | "Seaweed Song" | | 4:25 |

Extended edition bonus tracks
| No. | Title | Writer(s) | Length |
|---|---|---|---|
| 12. | "Sleepyhead" (stripped down version) | Angelakos; O'Hara | 2:28 |
| 13. | "Moth's Wings" (stripped down version) | | 4:02 |
| 14. | "Dreams" | Noel Hogan; Dolores O'Riordan | 4:18 |

Japanese edition bonus tracks
| No. | Title | Length |
|---|---|---|
| 12. | "I've Got Your Number" | 6:12 |
| 13. | "Better Things" | 4:32 |
| 14. | "Live to Tell the Tale" | 5:15 |
| 15. | "The Reeling" (Calvin Harris Remix) | 6:22 |
| 16. | "The Reeling" (Yasutaka Nakata [capsule] Remix) | 5:45 |
| 17. | "The Reeling" (music video) |

Sample credits

- "Sleepyhead" contains elements of "Óró Mo Bháidín" by Mary O'Hara.

== Personnel ==
Credits adapted from the liner notes of Manners.

=== Passion Pit ===
- Michael Angelakos
- Nathan Donmoyer
- Ian Hultquist
- Ayad Al Adhamy
- Jeff Apruzzese

=== Additional musicians ===
- PS22 Chorus – background vocals (tracks 2, 4, 10)
- Julian Tepper – background vocals (track 1)
- Sofia Degli Alessandri – background vocals (tracks 3, 4, 6, 7)
- Stuart Bogie – horns (tracks 1, 2, 4, 8)
- Eric Biondo – horns (tracks 1, 2, 4, 8)
- Paul Hogan – string arrangements (track 6)
- Cale Parks – vibes (tracks 6, 10, 11)
- Seth Jabour – guitar (track 2)
- Matthew Young – additional programming (tracks 1, 3)
- Grant Wheeler – additional programming (tracks 1, 3)
- George Pagonis – drums (track 1)

=== Technical ===
- Alex Aldi – recording (tracks 1–8, 10, 11); mixing (all tracks)
- Chris Zane – mixing, production
- Greg Calbi – mastering

=== Artwork ===
- OSK Design – art, design

== Charts ==
| Chart (2009) | Peak position |
|---|---|
| Australian Albums (ARIA) | 19 |
| Belgian Albums (Ultratop Wallonia) | 98 |
| French Albums (SNEP) | 123 |
| Irish Albums (IRMA) | 30 |
| Scottish Albums (Official Charts) | 88 |
| UK Albums (Official Charts) | 55 |
| US Billboard 200 | 51 |
| US Independent Albums (Billboard) | 8 |

== Certifications ==
| Region | Certification | Certified units/sales |
|---|---|---|
| United States (RIAA) | Gold | 500,000^{‡} |
^{‡} Sales+streaming figures based on certification alone.

== Release history ==
| Region | Date | Label | Ref. |
|---|---|---|---|
| Australia | May 15, 2009 | Sony | |
| France | May 18, 2009 | Sony | |
| United Kingdom | May 18, 2009 | Columbia | |
| United States | May 19, 2009 | Frenchkiss | |
| Italy | June 25, 2009 | Sony | |
| Germany | July 3, 2009 | Sony | |
| Japan | October 7, 2009 | Sony | |
