= Peaches (In the Valley Below song) =

Single by In the Valley Below

from the album The Belt
- Released: September 9, 2013
- Recorded: 2013
- Genre: Rock
- Length: 4:45
- Label: Capital
- Songwriters: Angela Gail Mattson; Jeffrey Jacob Mendel

"Peaches" is a song by American rock band In the Valley Below. The track was included on the Peaches and Man Girl EPs, and then later their debut studio album The Belt. As a single off of the latter, it peaked at number 18 on the Billboard Alternative Songs chart in 2016.

== Background ==
The song has been released on a number of the band's releases. It was first released on the Peaches EP in 2013, was later as a single off of the band's Man Girl EP in May 2014, and was finally released on the band's debut full-length studio album, The Belt in August 2014. The song gained in popularity after Kele Okereke of the band Bloc Party made a dance remix of the song, which was also included on the Man Girl EP. The song's popularity peaked in 2016, where it reached number 18 on the US Billboard Alternative Songs chart.

== Themes and composition ==
Billboard described the song as "a mix of synth-driven pop and darker folk. Spin similarly referred to it as "synth folk". PopMatters compared the song's guitar and keyboard tone to the Depeche Mode song "Strangelove". Lyrically, the song was inspired by the work of Phil Collins, in the way that it tells a dark story, but still have a catchy melody meant to inspire sing-alongs. The song features duet vocals by both core band members Angela Gail Mattson and Jeffrey Jacob Mendel, alternating lines like "You’ve been drinking all week, baby, that’s all right" and "You’ve been tearing me apart in the dead of night" before jointly singing in unison "We won’t live too long/ So let’s love for one song".

== Live performances ==
The band performed the song on live national television on The Late Show With David Letterman in August 2013, and on Conan in February 2015. The song has been a staple of the band's lives shows, being played frequently, including the Fiat sponsored concert series at Baby's All Right in Brooklyn, New York, and at SXSW in 2017.

== Reception ==
The song has been generally well-received. Paste identified the song as a standout track from The Belt, citing its catchy nature, stating "It makes sense that 'Peaches" opens up The Belt. Melodic and harmony-driven, it’s guaranteed to get stuck in your head...it was seared into my brain for a solid month." Renowned for Sound identified it as a standout track from the Peaches EP, calling it "the obvious selling point" and praising the track for its "mid-tempo outpour of rustic guitars and the duos exquisite vocals sharing the lead limelight on the tracks verses before a heavily harmonized chorus provides the track with its rich, finely crafted hook; Angela’s vocals appear to be channeling Lana Del Rey through her sultry and slightly smoky tones."

The Huffington Post deemed the song the number five song of 2014. As of April 2015, 62,000 copies of the single had been sold.

== Personnel ==
- Angela Gail Mattson – vocals, synthesizers, production, engineering
- Jeffrey Jacob Mendel – vocals, guitars, production, engineering

== Charts ==
Chart (2017)	Peak position
US Billboard Alternative Songs	18

== Certifications ==
Region	Certification	Certified units/sales
Canada (Music Canada)	Gold	40,000^{‡}
^{‡} Sales+streaming figures based on certification alone.
