= Chunk of Change =

EP by Passion Pit
- Released: September 16, 2008
- Genre: Indie pop
- Length: 29:15
- Label: Frenchkiss; Columbia

Passion Pit chronology
Chunk of Change (2008)	Manners (2009)

Professional ratings
Aggregate scores
Source	Rating
Metacritic	71/100
Review scores
Source	Rating
Clash	Favorable
Drowned in Sound	8/10
entertainment.ie	3.5/5 stars
Hot Press	3/5
musicOMH	3/5 stars
NME	7/10
Now	3/5
Pitchfork	7.9/10
PopMatters	6/10
URB	4/5 stars

Chunk of Change is the debut extended play (EP) by American electropop band Passion Pit, released on September 16, 2008, by Frenchkiss Records and Columbia Records. A video for the single "Sleepyhead" was released in October 2008, directed by The Wilderness. The track was featured in the debut trailer for the 2011 video game LittleBigPlanet 2. "Better Things" was sampled by the alternative hip hop duo Chiddy Bang for their 2009 song "Truth".

== Background ==
The tracks "Better Things" and "Sleepyhead" were added for the commercial release of the EP. "Sleepyhead" was eventually included on Passion Pit's debut studio album, Manners (2009).

== Reception ==
Pitchfork's Tyler Grisham praised the EP, writing that it "deftly walks the line between beat-driven, Hot Chip floor geeking and twee atmospherics".

Patrick Lyons of Seterogum writing for the EPs 10th anniversary, had still praised the EP with a groovy tone of teenage romance that Passion Pit held for its humble beginnings, "Angelakos’ bedroom pop was endearingly homespun and laptop-lo-fi at a time when that was still a novelly twee concept, but it sparkled and moved with expertise beyond its sonic constraints.".

== Track listing ==
All tracks are written by Michael Angelakos, except where noted.

No.	Title	Length
1.	"I've Got Your Number"	6:12
2.	"Smile Upon Me"	5:49
3.	"Cuddle Fuddle"	4:32
4.	"Live to Tell the Tale"	5:15
5.	"Better Things"	4:32
6.	"Sleepyhead" (Angelakos, Mary O'Hara)	2:55

=== Sample credits ===
- "Sleepyhead" contains elements from "Óró Mo Bháidín" by Mary O'Hara.

== Personnel ==
Credits adapted from the liner notes of Chunk of Change.

- Michael Angelakos – recording
- Ian Hultquist – vocal engineering (tracks 5, 6)
- Frank Napolski – artwork, layout

== Charts ==
Chart performance for Chunk of Change
Chart (2009)	Peak position
Australian Hitseekers Albums (ARIA)	13
France (SNEP)	58
US Heatseekers Albums (Billboard)	35

== Release history ==
Release history for Chunk of Change
Region	Date	Label	Ref.
United States	September 16, 2008	Frenchkiss; Columbia	
Australia	February 13, 2009	Sony	
France	February 16, 2009	Sony	
United Kingdom	February 16, 2009	Columbia	
