= Carried Away (Passion Pit song) =

Single by Passion Pit

from the album Gossamer
- Released: January 8, 2013
- Recorded: 2011; Gigantic Studios
- Genre: Indie pop; synth-pop
- Length: 3:42
- Label: Columbia
- Songwriter(s): Michael Angelakos
- Producer(s): Michael Angelakos; Chris Zane

Passion Pit singles chronology
"Constant Conversations" (2012)	"Carried Away" (2013)	"Cry Like a Ghost" (2013)

"Carried Away" is a song by American indietronica band Passion Pit from their second studio album, Gossamer (2012). The song was written and produced by the band's frontman Michael Angelakos, with Chris Zane providing co-production. It was released as the fourth single from the album in 2013.

The music video, directed by Brewer, was released on February 14, 2013. It featured American actress, director, and spokesperson Sophia Bush.

== Background ==
Carried Away is the third track on Gossamer, but the fourth single to be released from the album. Frontman Michael Angelakos described the song as "[his] favourite song on the record". On 19 November 2012, Passion Pit announced a "Carried Away Remix Contest" in collaboration with Indaba Music. The winner, Freddie Westborn, won $1000 as his prize and his remix was released as a free download.

== Music video ==
The music video for "Carried Away" was directed by Ben and Alex Brewer, produced by Braxton Pope and Saul Levitz - in collaboration with Sophia Bush. The video shows a troubled relationship portrayed by Michael Angelakos and Sophia Bush, arguing and quarreling frequently. Throughout the video their relationship becomes weaker and weaker, and the two reconcile their differences and take back things that they have said to each other. The video was released on February 14 (appropriately Valentine's Day) and has reached over 26,136,000 views on the Passion Pit Vevo YouTube account as of November 2020.

== Charts ==
=== Weekly charts ===
Chart (2013)	Peak position
Belgium Dance Bubbling Under (Ultratop Wallonia)	2
US Hot Rock & Alternative Songs (Billboard)	24
US Adult Pop Airplay (Billboard)	34
US Alternative Airplay (Billboard)	19
US Dance Club Songs (Billboard)	5
US Rock Airplay (Billboard)	31

=== Year-end charts ===
Chart (2013)	Position
US Hot Rock Songs (Billboard)	51
US Alternative Songs (Billboard)	46
