= I'll Be Alright (Passion Pit song) =

Single by Passion Pit

from the album Gossamer
- Released: June 12, 2012
- Recorded: 2011; Gigantic Studios
- Genre: Synth-pop
- Length: 4:23
- Label: Columbia
- Songwriter: Michael Angelakos
- Producers: Michael Angelakos, Chris Zane

Passion Pit singles chronology
| "Take a Walk" (2012) | "I'll Be Alright" (2012) | "Constant Conversations" (2012) |

"I'll Be Alright" is a song by American synthpop band Passion Pit from their second studio album, Gossamer (2012). The song was written and produced by the band's frontman Michael Angelakos. It was released as the second single from the album in June 2012. It received exposure being featured on the critically acclaimed video game FIFA 13 soundtrack, and received "Best New Track" status by Pitchfork Media.

The tracked leaked early on June 11 and was released as an NME premiere on June 8.

== Background ==
The second single from Gossamer finds Passion Pit frontman Michael Angelakos singing of drinking, pill necking and other bad things before proclaiming, "Go if you want to, I'll be alright." Speaking with Pitchfork, Angelakos explained the dark content of this track. "I really...hate dishonesty," he said, "which a lot of indie music is especially prone to. I like artists that are really honest and talk about their lives, because people invest in that as much as they invest in the record itself. I had a really rough year, and I got engaged right before recording - and recording takes a real toll on you. I vilified myself. I had to do it. I have a lot of issues, and a lot of people in the world have a lot of issues. There's the saying that the Sherman Brothers wrote: "A spoonful of sugar makes the medicine go down." That's exactly what Passion Pit is to me." Angelakos sings, "I'm so self-loathing that it's hard for me to see. Reality from what I dream and no one believes me," reflecting his long-term struggles with bipolar disorder, which involved multiple hospital stays. He told UK newspaper The Daily Telegraph: "I've been suffering from... you know, bipolar since I was 17. But I don't think that has anything to do with the music. Lots of people try to over-glorify it, like this thing that's really interesting, and actually it's the most painful thing in the world so I'd rather not talk about it." The chorus consists of bits of five different songs that Angelakos had written. He told Q magazine that it took him eight hours of programming before he even had a rough demo.

== Music video ==
The music video for "I'll Be Alright" was chosen through Genero.tv. In the winning video, a security guard for an art museum ingests hallucinogenic pills and then starts thinking that a piece of minimal art is singing to him. He responds by kissing it, until eventually being sucked into the art work after seeing a reflection of breaking up with a past love. The painting then explodes, as he falls back and is smothered with gold paint. He then wakes up after his hallucination and finds everything is back to normal.

== Formats and track listings ==
Digital download

1. "I'll Be Alright" – 4:22
