= Helicam =

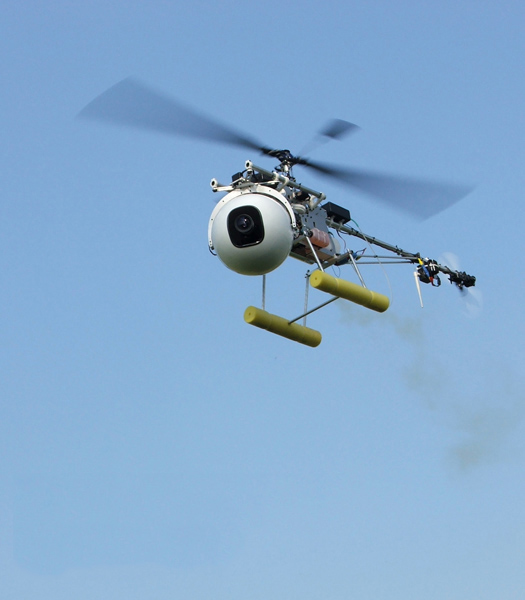
Copterfilms Coptercam3+CF30 Pan/Tilt/Roll camera mount

The Helicam is a remote-controlled mini helicopter used to obtain aerial pictures or motion images using video, still or motion film cameras. The remote controlled camera mount system allows pan, tilt and roll movements. A Wireless onboard video transmitter downlinks the live signal to the camera operator, images can be recorded on board, on the ground or both. The system is controlled by two operators with independent controls: the helicam pilot and camera operator.

One of the characteristics of the helicam is the flexibility and small size. The system can be flown practically everywhere providing a small spot of about 4 square meters is available to take off and land. Flight endurance ranges from 15 to 30 minutes, refueling can be done in seconds.

Helicams are used in film, sports and a variety of media.

A wireless system on board these RC aircraft transmits the live signal to the operator on the ground; these images can be monitored to capture both photography and video, for later editing. The use of these helicopters and airplanes allows us to photograph or record places that would otherwise be impossible to capture, thus obtaining entirely new and perspectives.
