= O2 Money =

- Type: Private Subsidiary
- Industry: Finance and insurance
- Founded: 15 July 2011; 15 years ago
- Founder: O2
- Headquarters: United Kingdom
- Area served: United Kingdom
- Products: Finance and insurance Credit Cards
- Owner: Telefónica UK Limited
- Parent: O2
- Subsidiaries: o2 wallet (Closed 2014)

O2 Money was a range of financial services provided by O2 in the United Kingdom.

Launched on 15 July 2011, O2 Money debuted as line of Visa cash cards issued by O2 and provided by NatWest. The cards enabled O2 customers to use digital currency as an alternative to cash or cheques.

O2 announced in a press release on 23 February 2011 the "second phase" for O2 Money. The phase involves the company's move away from physical currency through the discontinuation of the Cash Manager and Load & Go cash cards and the release of a "mobile wallet" application for Android and iOS devices. The application will use NFC technology embedded in a phone to access money banked with Barclays via O2.

== History ==
=== Pre-release ===
O2 began trials of NFC technology in 2007, with 500 individuals participating in the trial. The individuals used a specific Nokia handset to make payments at selected retailers, and travel the London Underground with transactions made via Barclays. O2 has since been in discussions with large retailers, such as Tesco and W. H. Smith, for the deployment of the necessary electronic point of sale units, and with handset manufacturers, such as Apple and Samsung, to enable NFC technology on all future devices.

In February 2010, the GSMA, Samsung, Telefónica, Visa and La Caixa demonstrated mobile payments at the Mobile World Congress in Barcelona. Participating companies provided 400 NFC enabled handsets to guests for use at the Congress. The Samsung S5230 NFC-enabled handsets contained O2 SIM cards pre-loaded with £55 and a La Caixa Visa Mobile Payment application. Participants were able to use the handsets to pay for food and drink up to the value of £70 at 30 locations at the congress.

It was the first SIM card-based Near Field Communication technology payment to be demonstrated at the event.

In May 2010, Telefónica Europe began a controlled commercial trial of its NFC service in Plzeň, a city in the Czech Republic. The trial consisted of O2 distributing Nokia 6212 Classic mobile phone with NFC functionality. The phones were pre-loaded with transportation tickets and city services cards. It is the first time that Telefónica has offered NFC services on a commercial basis.

=== O2 Money ===
O2 Money was launched in partnership with NatWest by O2 in July 2009. O2 had previously been working with Barclays to trial NFC mobile payments. However, Tim Sefton, Customer Director at O2 stated the partnership with NatWest did not preclude future partnerships with other banks.

O2 Money has been described by Ronan Dunne, CEO at O2, as the first step in implementing NFC technology in mobile phones in the United Kingdom.

The service received over 100,000 applications in the first seven weeks, making it the most successful financial card launch in the United Kingdom.

Both cards were provided free and exclusive to O2 customers.

=== Transition ===
| Date | | | | | | | | Event |
| 2011 | | | | | | | | Event |
| 2011 | November | | | | | | | |
|---|---|---|---|---|---|---|---|---|
| 2011 | 31 | 1 | 2 | 3 | 4 | 5 | 6 | Users won't be able to load money onto an O2 Money card and any regular loads will automatically stop. |
| 2011 | 7 | 8 | 9 | 10 | 11 | 12 | 13 | Accounts will close and users won't be able to use their card to spend money. |
| 2011 | 14 | 15 | 16 | 17 | 18 | 19 | 20 | |
| 2011 | 21 | 22 | 23 | 24 | 25 | 26 | 27 | |
| 2011 | 28 | 29 | 30 | 1 | 2 | 3 | 4 | Remaining money on cards will be refunded as cheques. |
| 2011 | December | | | | | | | |
| 2011 | 28 | 29 | 30 | 1 | 2 | 3 | 4 | |
| 2011 | 5 | 6 | 7 | 8 | 9 | 10 | 11 | |
| 2011 | 12 | 13 | 14 | 15 | 16 | 17 | 18 | Accounts will be terminated and support services will be closed. |
| 2011 | 19 | 20 | 21 | 22 | 23 | 24 | 25 | |
| 2011 | 26 | 27 | 28 | 29 | 30 | 31 | 1 | |

=== Mobile wallet ===
A spokesman for O2 announced on 3 February 2011 the company's plans to release a "mobile wallet" application, an NFC-powered mobile payment application for NFC-enabled smartphones in the second half of 2011. O2 has since expressed its ambition to release the application before the 2012 Summer Olympics in London.

The application allows users from any UK mobile network to use their smartphone to access money loaded on to a prepaid visa debit card, which is issued electronically when you register. You can also upgrade and obtain a physical Visa debit card for the cost of £3. There are plans to enable customers to use their smartphones as an electronic ticket, such as the Oyster Card used throughout transportation in London.

O2 has applied for an electronic money licence from the Financial Services Authority which will allow it to offer money transfers between customers in addition to contactless payments at 60,000 locations in the UK.

James Le Brocq, Head of Financial Services at O2, told Mobile News he expects to announce a range of partnerships with "a number" of organisations in relation to the mobile wallet service, most likely before Q3 2011.

The mobile wallet application is available for the Android and iOS operating systems.

==== Closure ====
It was announced on 9 January 2014 that the O2 wallet service would be closing as of 31 March 2014.

=== O2 Money ===
End of October 2020 Telefónica Germany together with Comdirect (part of Commerzbank) launched a mobile app called O2 Money that provides users with an overview of their finances, includes functions of personal budgeting tool and a listing of all contracts and subscriptions. It also offers interest in exchange for aggregated account data via a bonus programme for O2 customers. Nevertheless, this financial app is free to use for anyone.
