= Sleepyhead =

Single by Passion Pit

from the album Chunk of Change and Manners
- A-side: "Sleepyhead"
- B-side: "Better Things"
- Released: September 8, 2008
- Recorded: 2008
- Genre: Synth-pop
- Length: 2:55
- Label: Columbia (UK); Frenchkiss (U.S.); Neon Gold
- Songwriter: Michael Angelakos
- Producer: Chris Zane

Passion Pit singles chronology
"Sleepyhead" (2008)	"The Reeling" (2009)

"Sleepyhead" is the debut single from American electronic band Passion Pit, featured on their first EP, Chunk of Change, and later on their debut album Manners. The single was released on September 8, 2008.

The music video showcases a series of images with clapping hands, instruments and Michael Angelakos singing, all together it mimicks the animation style of a zoetrope.

The song contains samples of "Óró Mo Bháidín" by Mary O'Hara and "San Francisco Scene (The Beat Generation)" by Jack Kerouac ("and everything is going to the beat").

== Track listing ==
Single

No.	Title	Length
1.	"Sleepyhead"	2:55
2.	"Better things"	4:32

== Charts ==
Chart (2008/2009)	Peak position
Canada (Canadian Hot 100)	71
U.S. Bubbling Under Hot 100 Singles	4
U.S. Heatseekers Songs	9

Chart (2011)	Peak position
U.S. Hot Dance Club Songs	11

== Certifications ==
Region	Certification	Certified units/sales
New Zealand (RMNZ)	Gold	15,000^{‡}
United Kingdom (BPI)	Silver	200,000^{‡}
United States (RIAA)	2× Platinum	2,000,000^{‡}
^{‡} Sales+streaming figures based on certification alone.

== Legacy ==
In the announcement trailer for the puzzle-platform game LittleBigPlanet 2, the instrumental of the Chunk of Change version of the song was used. This included usage in the game's official soundtrack.

On day 1 of the Artemis II mission, a cover of the song was played to temporarily wake up the crew for the Perigee Raise Burn.
