= The Reeling =

Single by Passion Pit

from the album Manners
- Released: May 11, 2009
- Recorded: 2008
- Genre: Electropop; indietronica; alternative dance; neo-psychedelia
- Length: 4:48
- Label: Columbia; Frenchkiss
- Songwriter: Michael Angelakos
- Producer: Chris Zane

Passion Pit singles chronology
"Sleepyhead" (2008)	"The Reeling" (2009)	"To Kingdom Come" (2009)

Official audio
- "The Reeling" on YouTube

"The Reeling" is a song by American electronic band Passion Pit. It was released on May 11, 2009, as the first single from the band's debut studio album, Manners. The song features background vocals from the PS22 Chorus. Generally well received by music critics, the single entered the Billboard Alternative Songs chart in September 2009. In the United Kingdom, the single originally peaked at number 137, but was re-issued in January 2010, where it performed slightly better at number 99. With this improved showing, the record company then re-issued "Sleepyhead" in March 2010. The song was featured on soccer video game Pro Evolution Soccer 2011.

== Music video ==
A music video for the song premiered in April 2009. It depicts a carefree night on the town and uses ripped-paper visual effects. For unknown reasons, the original music video on YouTube is currently blocked outside the United States, Canada, United Kingdom, Republic of Ireland, Australia, New Zealand, France, Germany, and the Arab world.

A remixed version of "The Reeling" was used on the trailer for the fourth season of the British TV series Skins.

== Critical reception ==
Lou Thomas of the BBC praised the song's vocals and beats, and called it "unquestionably one of the greatest songs of 2009." Emily Kendrick of This Is Fake DIY noted the song's exuberance and compared it vocally to the Bee Gees. Louise Brailey of NME said the song's opening "sounds weirdly like an old-school hardcore breakdown, before collapsing into starry disco-pop." Mike Diver of Clash magazine said the song "combine[s] elements of the purest pop with compositional playfulness." Matthew Cole of Slant Magazine credits the song's ability, along with album track "Moth's Wings," to combine decades worth of "party music" genres, including disco, house, rave, and 1980s rock. Zach Kelly of Pitchfork Media described the song as sweet and earnest, adding that listeners "won't remember it the next morning, but it probably earned a grin the night before." Andrzej Lukowski of Drowned in Sound called the song "quite annoying," though he gave the album a favorable review overall.

== Chart performance ==
Chart (2009)	Peak position
Japan Hot 100	19
UK Singles (The Official Charts Company)	137
U.S. Billboard Alternative Songs	34
Chart (2010)	Peak position
Scottish Singles Sales (Official Charts)	74
UK Singles (Official Charts)	99

== Track listing ==
Digital download
No.	Title	Length
1.	"The Reeling" (Calvin Harris Remix)	6:22
2.	"The Reeling" (Shuttle Remix)	5:26
3.	"The Reeling" (Groove Police Club Mix)	8:15
4.	"The Reeling" (Groove Police Radio Mix)	3:39
5.	"The Reeling" (Dean Coleman Bass Hit Club Mix)	6:27
6.	"The Reeling" (Dean Coleman Bass Hit Radio Mix)	3:40
