= Little Secrets (Passion Pit song) =

Single by Passion Pit

from the album Manners
- Released: December 14, 2009
- Recorded: 2008
- Genre: Electropop, wonky pop, alternative dance
- Length: 3:58
- Label: Columbia
- Songwriter(s): Michael Angelakos
- Producer(s): Passion Pit

Passion Pit singles chronology
"To Kingdom Come" (2009)	"Little Secrets" (2009)	"Take a Walk" (2012)

"Little Secrets", written by Michael Angelakos, is the third single by American electropop group Passion Pit, taken from their debut album Manners. The song features background vocals from the PS22 Chorus.

Former Washington Nationals pitcher Dan Haren had used the song as his run-out music. The song is also featured in the video games MLB 11: The Show, MLB 2K13 and Test Drive Unlimited 2.

== Music video ==
Two music videos have been released for the song. The first, directed by Francesco Meneghini, was released in November 2009 and features an abstract remake of the Stargate sequence from 2001: A Space Odyssey. A second video, directed by Timothy Saccenti, premiered in February 2010, and features the band performing to an exuberant crowd of people wearing paper bags painted with faces. As the band performs, the paper bags disintegrate into confetti.

== Chart performance ==
Chart (2010)	Peak position
Australia (ARIA)	48
US Alternative Songs (Billboard)	39
