= Kindred (Passion Pit album) =

Studio album by Passion Pit
- Released: April 21, 2015
- Length: 37:35
- Label: Columbia
- Producer: Chris Zane; Benny Blanco; Michael Angelakos; Alex Aldi

Passion Pit chronology
Constant Conversations (2013)	Kindred (2015)	Tremendous Sea of Love (2017)

Singles from Kindred
- 1. "Lifted Up (1985)" Released: February 16, 2015; 2. "Where the Sky Hangs" Released: February 17, 2015; 3. "Until We Can't (Let's Go)" Released: April 7, 2015

Kindred is the third studio album by American electropop band Passion Pit. It was released on April 21, 2015, by Columbia Records.

== Background ==
On June 24, 2014, lead singer Michael Angelakos announced through Twitter that Passion Pit are working on their as yet to be titled third studio album. Angelakos confirmed that the third album would in fact be released in 2015. In anticipation of the release, the band posted several coded images to various social networking platforms. Soon after the release of the Morse code image, the official Passion Pit website, which had been under construction since the end of the 2013 tour, came back up. It is now known as "KindredTheAlbum.com". The website includes a short 13 second clip titled "That flickering light's just a flame" and a picture of Angelakos jumping in the air.

"Lifted Up (1985)
Sample of "Lifted Up (1985)", the first single from Kindred, which was dedicated to Angelakos's wife.

On February 16, 2015, the band uploaded the lead single for the new album "Lifted Up (1985)" onto its YouTube channel. The band then followed up by releasing the names of the rest of the tracks and by announcing the album would be available for pre-order the following day (Tuesday February 17, 2015). The third track, titled "Where the Sky Hangs" was also released on Passion Pit's Vevo page in the early hours of February 17, 2015.

On April 14, 2015, the album began streaming on iTunes Radio's First Play station as a preview for the album to be released.

== Reception ==
Professional ratings
Aggregate scores
Source	Rating
Metacritic	72/100
Review scores
Source	Rating
AllMusic	4/5 stars
Chicago Tribune	3/4 stars
Consequence of Sound	B
Exclaim!	8/10
Pitchfork	6.8/10
Slant Magazine	1.5/5 stars

Kindred has received generally positive reviews, obtaining a normalised score of 72 based on 22 reviews.

== Track listing ==
No.	Title	Writer(s)	Producer(s)	Length
1.	"Lifted Up (1985)"	Michael Angelakos; Benjamin Levin	Chris Zane; Benny Blanco; Angelakos; Alex Aldi	4:23
2.	"Whole Life Story"	Angelakos; Levin	Zane; Blanco; Angelakos; Aldi	3:18
3.	"Where the Sky Hangs"	Angelakos	Zane; Angelakos; Aldi	3:50
4.	"All I Want"	Angelakos; Levin	Zane; Blanco; Angelakos; Aldi	3:26
5.	"Five Foot Ten (I)"	Angelakos	Zane; Angelakos; Aldi	4:34
6.	"Dancing on the Grave"	Angelakos	Zane; Angelakos; Aldi	3:28
7.	"Until We Can't (Let's Go)"	Angelakos; Hans Zimmer; Levin	Zane; Blanco; Angelakos; Aldi	4:05
8.	"Looks Like Rain"	Angelakos	Zane; Angelakos; Aldi	3:55
9.	"My Brother Taught Me How to Swim"	Angelakos	Zane; Angelakos; Aldi	4:12
10.	"Ten Feet Tall (II)"	Angelakos	Zane; Angelakos; Aldi	2:24
Total length:				37:35

== Charts ==
Chart (2015)	Peak position
Australian Albums (ARIA)	30
UK Albums (OCC)	81
US Billboard 200	23
US Top Alternative Albums (Billboard)	2
US Top Rock Albums (Billboard)	3
