= Passion Pit =

American electropop band

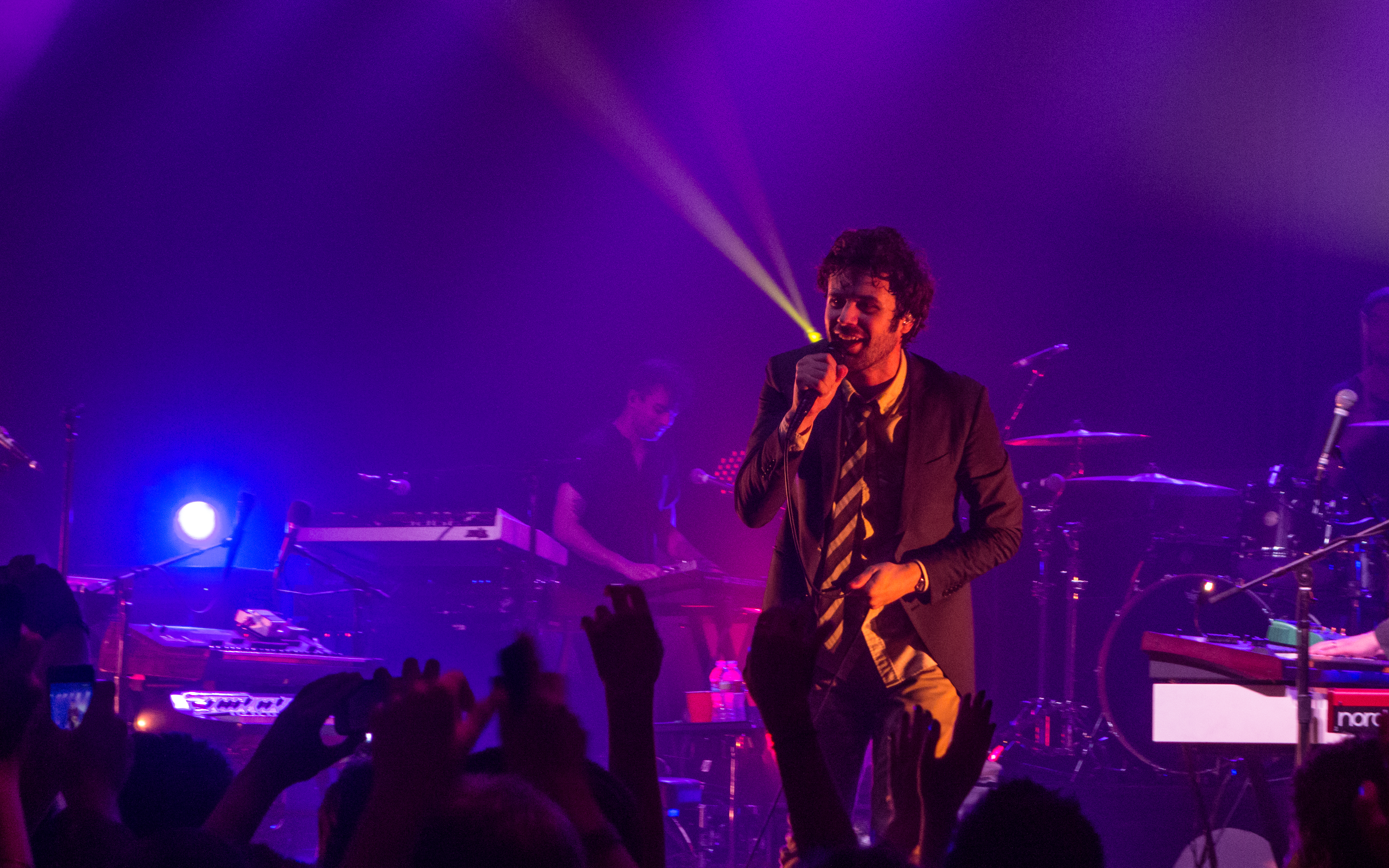
- Passion Pit performing with Matt and Kim in 2013

Background information
- Origin: Cambridge, Massachusetts, U.S.
- Genres: Electropop; alternative dance; indietronica; synth-pop; indie pop; neo-psychedelia; art pop
- Years active: 2007–present
- Labels: Frenchkiss; Columbia
- Spinoff of: Cherry Bing
- Members: Michael Angelakos
- Website: passionpit.com

Passion Pit is an American indie pop band from Cambridge, Massachusetts. Formed in 2007, frontman and keyboardist Michael Angelakos is the band's primary recording member. As a touring act, the band currently consists of Angelakos (vocals, synthesiser), Chris Hartz (drums), Aaron Harrison Folb (bass, synthesiser), Giuliano Pizzulo (guitar, synthesiser), and Ray Suen (guitars, synthesiser).

The band released their debut studio album Manners in 2009. A second album entitled Gossamer was released in 2012, which debuted at No. 4 on the Billboard 200 and gave the band their first top 10 album. Kindred, the band's third album, was released on April 17, 2015. Their fourth album, Tremendous Sea of Love, was self-released by the band in 2017.

== History ==
=== Early years and Chunk of Change: 2007–2009 ===
The band formed in 2007. The band culled their name from the Variety Slanguage Dictionary, a glossary of Variety's frequently used slang, which was provided by the Hollywood insider publication to help not-so-savvy readers decipher its content. The magazine used the term to refer to drive-in theatres, because of their privacy and romantic allure for teenagers.

The first Passion Pit songs, which would later become the Chunk of Change EP, were written by Angelakos at Emerson College as a belated Valentine's Day gift to his then-girlfriend. At first, he wrote and performed all his material alone using a laptop. After one of his solo shows in the Boston area, Ian Hultquist, who was attending Berklee College of Music at the time, approached Angelakos and expressed interest in creating and playing music collaboratively. They formed a group that consisted of Angelakos, Hultquist, Ayad Al Adhamy, Thom Plasse (bass), and Adam Lavinsky (drums). The band spent a considerable amount of time trying to flesh out a collaborative format and structure that would work best for them. Jeff Apruzzese and Nate Donmoyer joined the band shortly after they signed to Frenchkiss in 2008, replacing Plasse and Lavinsky, respectively. In 2012, Adhamy was replaced by Xander Singh.

The band's debut EP, Chunk of Change, was released on September 16, 2008. The first four tracks were those that Angelakos had written as a gift for his girlfriend. The tracks quickly became popular throughout the Emerson College campus, where Angelakos was attending classes at the time, and had been passing out his own, self-produced copies. Two tracks, "Sleepyhead" and "Better Things", were added for the commercial release of the EP. The same year of their debut EP's release, the band was chosen as "Best New Local Act in 2008" in the WFNX/Boston Phoenix best music poll.

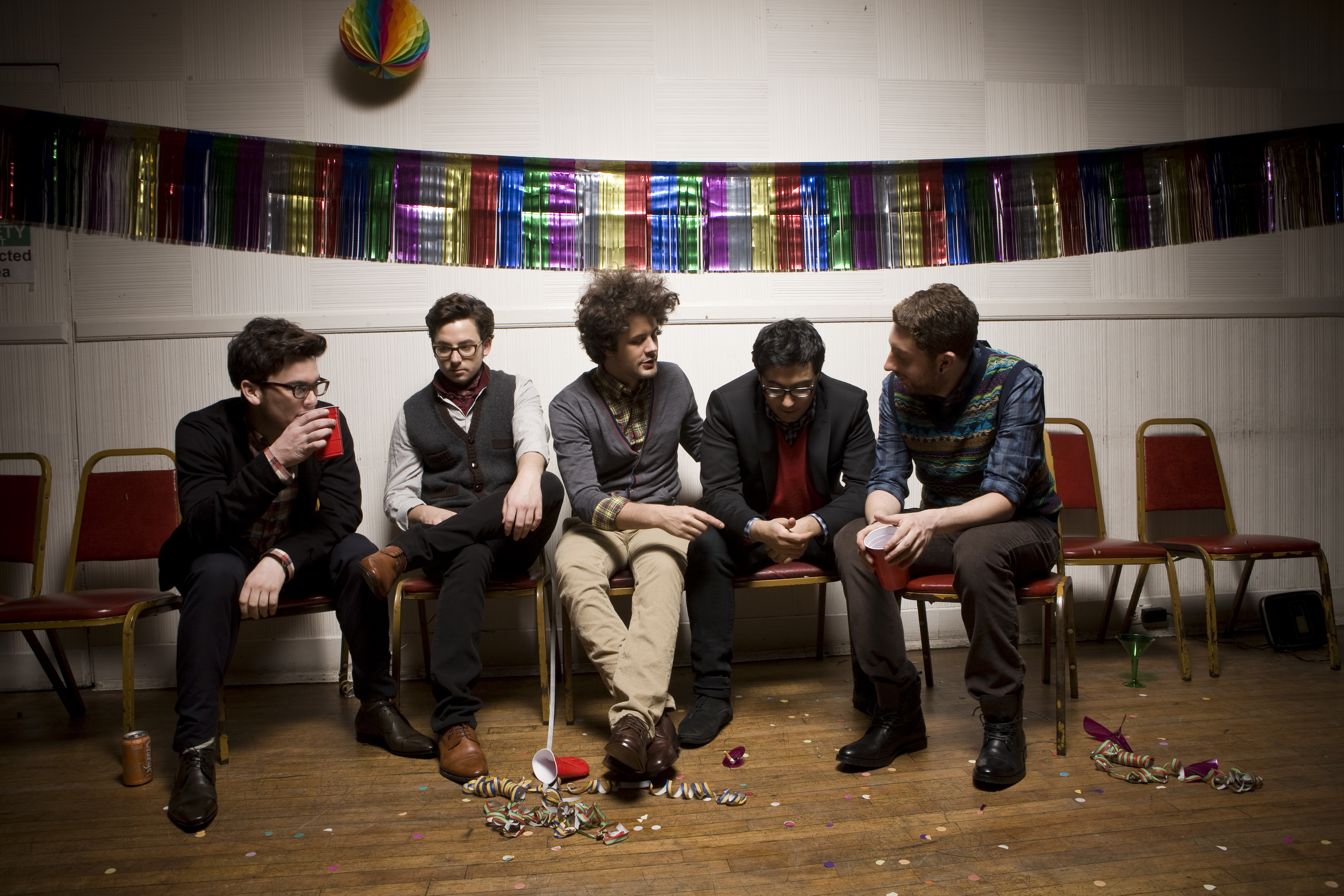
Passion Pit in 2008

The first and only single to be released from the EP, "Sleepyhead", received a good deal of exposure through its use in numerous media campaigns and advertisements, while the video for the song, directed by The Wilderness, was included on Pitchfork's Top 40 Music Videos of 2008 list. The song contains samples of "Óró Mo Bháidín" by Irish singer and harpist Mary O'Hara.

Other songs from the EP received some exposure as well. "Cuddle Fuddle" was featured in E4's second series of The Inbetweeners and "I've Got Your Number" was used in an advertisement for the cash card from O2, Money in the UK.

=== Manners: 2009–2011 ===
The band's first full-length studio album, Manners, was released on May 18, 2009, in the UK and May 19, 2009, in the United States and Canada. In celebration, the band played their record release party on the 18th in New York City on a Rocks Off boat cruise. In a preview article, ClashMusic.com commented that the album "has every chance to rank as one of the year's best" and that "it reveals additional nuances with each visit: a sure-fire sign of an album with true longevity". Critic Emily Burnham felt Passion Pit were now part of a revived electropop scene alongside acts like Hot Chip and LCD Soundsystem; Burnham also drew comparisons to 1980s artists such as the Human League and OMD.

In order to obtain a specific background vocal accompaniment the band was looking for on Manners, Passion Pit enlisted the help of the PS22 chorus, who recorded vocals in-studio for three of the album's songs: "The Reeling", "Little Secrets", and "Let Your Love Grow Tall." "The Reeling" was the first single to be released from the album and found success on the Billboard Alternative Songs chart in the fall of 2009, where it peaked at No. 34 in October and "Little Secrets" was the third single to be released and had success on the chart as well, topping out at No. 39. "Let Your Love Grow Tall" was never released as a single but had some exposure being used in the sixteenth episode of the fourth season of the TV series Ugly Betty.

The album's second single, "To Kingdom Come", was used in the Rhapsody commercial for its iPhone application.

"Sleepyhead" was the only track from Chunk of Change to be included on the album and was made available from iTunes for free as a discovery download in 2009. The song continued to receive additional exposure through its appearances in advertisements. It was used in the third series of the British teen drama Skins, as well as in the debut trailer for the video game LittleBigPlanet 2. This led to the band's increased popularity amongst fans and players of the game, who eventually created an in-game instrumental version of the song to listen to in the first game. When the sequel was released, it came with the song's actual instrumental version used in the trailer.

The song "Moth's Wings" was used in the fourth episode of the third season of the CW teen drama Gossip Girl and in the closing credits of episode 36 of HBO's Big Love. It appeared in the FIFA 10 video game and was included in the trailer for the 2010 film Life As We Know It, as well as the trailer for Big Miracle, and was also featured in the end credits of the 2017 film Wonder. It has also been used as a background theme for Sky Sports coverage of the UEFA Champions League and as the music for a dance routine in Episode 5, Season 8, of the US television show So You Think You Can Dance, which received a standing ovation from the show's judges. It was also featured in two episodes of MTV's show Awkward (the pilot and Season 3 finale, respectively).

In June 2009, the band performed at the Glastonbury Festival 2009 in Pilton, Somerset, England, where they dedicated the final song of their set to festival headliner Jarvis Cocker, who was to perform on the same stage later that same day. Afterwards, NME, while favorably reviewing Passion Pit's performance, incorrectly reported the band as having dedicated their entire set to Cocker.

On April 13, 2010, the band reissued Manners in a deluxe edition format which contained new artwork and three additional tracks: stripped-down versions of "Sleepyhead" and "Moth's Wings" and a cover of the Cranberries' song "Dreams". The deluxe release coincided with the extension of their North American headlining tour.

The band released another cover in June 2010, this time offering up their take on the Smashing Pumpkins hit song "Tonight, Tonight" as part of a promotion with Levi's called "Pioneer Sessions".

In September 2010, Passion Pit toured with the English band Muse as their opening act for eight shows during their fall tour through parts of the US. Following those supporting shows, the band headlined the Campus Consciousness Tour, produced by Pretty Polly Productions in collaboration with Guster guitarist Adam Gardner's non-profit organization Reverb. The two-week tour featured stops at twelve college campuses and, in addition to the music, focused on promoting eco-friendly lifestyles. Opening acts for the tour included Black Joe Lewis & the Honeybears and K. Flay.

=== Gossamer: 2011–2013 ===
In an August 2010 interview with NME, Angelakos stated that work had already begun on the follow-up to Manners and that the band intended to release the album in the spring of 2011. The release date was later announced as July 23, 2012.

Days after they have been presented in the Lollapalooza festival in Brazil in March 2012, they announced the title of the album, Gossamer, and that it would be released on July 24, 2012. Following its release, Gossamer debuted at No. 4 on the Billboard 200 with first-week sales of 37,000 copies, a career best.

On May 7, 2012, the first track from Gossamer was released, called "Take a Walk". On June 12, the second track from Gossamer was released, called "I'll Be Alright". The track leaked early on June 11 and was released as an NME premiere on June 8. On July 9, a third track from Gossamer, called "Constant Conversations", was reviewed and featured as "best new track" by Pitchfork. It was released with the review as streamed content. Gossamer was officially released on July 20, 2012. On July 16, Angelakos posted on the Passion Pit website, announcing the band cancelled the remaining July tour dates and suspended the tour in order for Angelakos to seek ongoing treatment for bipolar disorder. A Rolling Stone interview stated that Angelakos was diagnosed at 17, undergoing therapy, hospital care, and taking medication ever since.

On October 13, the band performed on Saturday Night Live, playing "Take a Walk" and "Carried Away." Passion Pit's song "Where I Come From" appeared on the soundtrack for the film The Twilight Saga: Breaking Dawn Part 2, which released in November.

On July 15, 2013, it was announced publicly that the band would be headlining the first ever "Coastline Festival" in Tampa, Florida and West Palm Beach, Florida with Two Door Cinema Club and Matt & Kim. Also included in the lineup are groups such as Fitz and the Tantrums, The Joy Formidable, The Neighbourhood, Capital Cities, The Mowgli's, Blondfire, Surfer Blood, The Royal Concept and St. Lucia. On September 24, Passion Pit released the Constant Conversations EP, originally released through Spotify, but was then made available on iTunes. The EP featured an alternative version of "Constant Conversations" from their 2012 album Gossamer, in addition to a formerly unreleased B-side called "Ruin Your Day". The final track on the EP was a remix of "Carried Away" by Dillon Francis.

=== Kindred: 2014–2016 ===
Passion Pit released Kindred on April 21, 2015, through Columbia Records. On June 24, 2014, Angelakos announced through Twitter that Passion Pit are working on their as yet to be titled third studio album. Angelakos confirmed that the third album would in fact be released in 2015. In anticipation of the release, the band posted several coded images to various social networking platforms. Soon after the release of the Morse code image, the official Passion Pit website, which had been under construction since the end of the 2013 tour, came back up. It is now known as "KindredTheAlbum.com". The website includes a short 13 second clip titled "That flickering light's just a flame" and a picture of Angelakos jumping in the air. On February 16, 2015, the band uploaded the lead single for the new album "Lifted Up (1985)" onto its YouTube channel. The band then followed up by releasing the names of the rest of the tracks and by announcing the album would be available for pre-order the following day (Tuesday February 17, 2015). The third track, titled "Where the Sky Hangs" was also released on the Passion Pit Vevo in the early hours of February 17, 2015. Following the release of their new album, Passion Pit had announced a tour across the United States, part of Canada, and even a stop in Tokyo, Japan. Angelakos continued to tour throughout the year.

=== Tremendous Sea of Love: 2017–present ===
During February and March 2017, several new Passion Pit songs were uploaded on YouTube on the account The Wishart Group (from the name of a project started by Michael Angelakos and dedicated to supporting musicians by providing them with legal, educational and healthcare services, with a focus on mental health, a topic on which Angelakos has been especially forthcoming), foreshadowing a fourth album for 2017. All of the videos for those new songs have the same background photo (a woman wearing a white dress, located in the middle of the sea, turning around as though she had sensed she was being secretly observed from behind), as does the front cover of the album. The songs were taken down, but Angelakos announced that he will give a downloadable copy of the album for free to anyone who retweets neuroscientist Michael F. Wells' tweet on the importance of science and research. The profits from the album will be donated to a psychiatric research institution in Cambridge, Massachusetts.

On July 11, an official release for the album was announced for July 28 on all streaming services.

The band embarked on a North American tour between January and February 2018 to promote Tremendous Sea of Love as well as their EP Chunk of Change's 10th anniversary.

On May 14, 2019, Passion Pit teamed up with electronic duo Galantis for a new single "I FOUND U", and the band released 40 tracks through their SoundCloud account in December 2020. However, as of December 22, 2023, most of the tracks were no longer available.

On February 21, 2023, it was announced that Passion Pit was returning to perform live at WeHo Pride by OUTLOUD Music Festival on June 2, along with Grace Jones, Carly Rae Jepsen and others.

On April 10, 2023, Passion Pit rereleased the track "American Blood" as a single. It was previously a bonus track on the iTunes edition of Gossamer.

The band performed at the Just Like Heaven music festival in Pasadena, California, in May 2024.

== Band members ==
Current

- Michael Angelakos – lead vocals, keyboards (2007–present)

Live musicians

- Eric Scullin – (2026)
- Denzel Cox – (2026)
- Ben Barter – (2026)
- Giuliano Pizzulo – guitar, synthesizers (2015–present)

Former live musicians

- Chris Hartz – drums (2013–2024)
- Aaron Harrison Folb – bass, synthesizers (2015–2024)
- Ray Suen – guitar, synthesizers (2015–2024)
- Thom Plasse – bass (2007)
- Adam Lavinsky – drums (2007)
- Ayad Al Adhamy – keyboards, samples (2007–2012)
- Ian Hultquist – guitars, keyboards (2007–2014)
- Jeff Apruzzese – bass, synthesizers (2008–2014)
- Nate Donmoyer – drums (2008–2013)
- Emily Greene – keyboards, vocals (2012–2013)
- Xander Singh – keyboards (2012–2014)
- Pete Cafarella – synthesizers (2015)

== Awards and accolades ==
Award	Year	Nominee(s)	Category	Result	Ref.
International Dance Music Awards	2010	Passion Pit	Best Break-Through Artist (Group)	Nominated	
International Dance Music Awards	2013	"Take a Walk"	Best Alternative/Indie Rock Dance Track	Nominated	
MTV Video Music Awards	2009	"The Reeling"	Breakthrough Video	Nominated	
mtvU Woodie Awards	2009	Passion Pit	Breaking Woodie	Nominated	
mtvU Woodie Awards	2014	"Carried Away"	Best Video Woodie	Nominated	

In 2012, listeners of Australia's alternative radio station Triple J Hottest 100 voted "Take a Walk" as No. 46 of the hottest 100 tracks of the year.

They were voted Act of the Year in the 2009 Boston Music Awards.

== Discography ==
- Manners (2009)
- Gossamer (2012)
- Kindred (2015)
- Tremendous Sea of Love (2017)
