= Mary O'Hara =

Irish singer and harpist

- Born: 12 May 1935 (age 91); County Sligo, Ireland
- Genres: Irish traditional Folk
- Occupations: Soprano singer, harpist
- Instrument: Harp

Mary O'Hara (born 12 May 1935) is an Irish soprano and harpist from County Sligo. She gained attention on both sides of the Atlantic in the late 1950s and early 1960s. Her recordings of that period influenced a generation of Irish female singers who credit O'Hara with influencing their style, among them Carmel Quinn, Mary Black and Moya Brennan. In his autobiography Memoirs of an Irish Troubadour (2002), Liam Clancy wrote how her music inspired and influenced him and others of the folk revival period.

== Early life and career ==
Mary O'Hara is the daughter of Major John Charles O'Hara, an officer in the British Corps of Royal Engineers, and his wife, Mai (née Kirwan). One of her sisters was actress Joan O'Hara, and her nephew is playwright Sebastian Barry.

O'Hara won her first competition, Sligo's annual Music and Drama singing competition, at the age of eight, and made her first radio broadcast on Radio Éireann before she left school at the age of 16. She went on to perform at Edinburgh International Fringe Festival with the Dublin University Players, BBC's Quite Contrary and The Ed Sullivan Show, before she starred in her own BBC television series. Her first recording contract was with Decca Records. Part of her extensive music career included spending a considerable amount of time on the Aran Islands collecting folk music and acquiring fluent Irish.

She was the subject of This Is Your Life in 1978 when she was surprised by Eamonn Andrews while filming at the National Motor Museum, Beaulieu.

== Personal life ==
She was introduced to American poet Richard Selig by Irish poet Thomas Kinsella and she married Selig in 1956. She moved to the United States with him. Selig died of Hodgkin's disease 15 months after their marriage. O'Hara continued to tour and record for four years.

In 1962, she became a Benedictine nun at Stanbrook Abbey in England, where she stayed for 12 years. Her wedding band was melted down and made into a ring to celebrate her profession of solemn vows as a member of the Benedictine Order in 1967.

O'Hara's initial rise to a high profile was repeated in 1974 when she left the monastery for the sake of her health, found that her musical reputation had grown during her time in the cloister, and returned to performing. In a matter of months, she became one of the biggest international recording stars to come out of Ireland. Her 1981 album The Scent of the Roses was produced by Andrew Pryce Jackman and Jo Stewart.

The title of her 1980 autobiography, The Scent of the Roses, is taken from one of her favourite songs by Irish poet Thomas Moore. Her other books include Celebration of Love, and the coffee table book A Song for Ireland.

She continued her singing career for a further 16 years, retiring from performing in 1994. In 1985, she married Pádraig O'Toole, who was instrumental in the development of her career from 1974. They spent six years in Tanzania where her husband taught at the Tanzania School of Journalism, at the University of Dar es Salaam. A musical play about her life, Harp on the Willow by John Misto, was a great success in Australia in early 2007. Mary O'Hara completed five volumes of her harp accompaniments and still travels, giving talks at locales such as the Yeats International Summer School, Sligo (2007), the O'Carolan Festival, Keadue, County Roscommon (2008), Northern Lights Harp Festival, Ottawa (2009), New York University (2009), and Boston College (2009). The Burns Library at Boston College houses her papers and held a "Mary O'Hara" exhibition ending on 30 April 2010.

As of 2016, O'Hara resides on the Aran Islands, off the west coast of Ireland. O'Toole died in 2015.

== Influence in modern culture ==
O'Hara's recording of "Óró Mo Bháidín" is sampled in Passion Pit's 2008 single "Sleepyhead" and Sub Focus' song "Safe in Sound" from the album Torus. The melody is also used in Chris de Burgh's "A Spaceman Came Travelling" as part of the chorus.

== Discography ==
- Songs of Erin, Decca-Beltona 1957
- Love Songs of Ireland, Decca-Beltona 1958
- Songs of Ireland, Tradition Records 1958
- Songs of Ireland, Decca-Emerald 1967
- The Folk Song Tradition (one track), Tradition Records 1960
- Mary O'Hara's Ireland, Decca Emerald-Gem 1973
- Mary O'Hara's Scotland, Decca Emerald-Gem 1974
- Monday Tuesday, Decca Emerald-Gem 1977
- Mary O'Hara at the Royal Festival Hall, Chrysalis 1977 – UK No. 37
- Focus on Mary O'Hara, Decca 1978
- Music Speaks Louder Than Words, Chrysalis 1978
- In Harmony, Chrysalis 1979
- Farewell, But Whenever / Reminiscing, Hammer 1979
- Tranquility, Warwick 1979 – UK No. 12
- The Last Rose of Summer French Everest Records
- The Scent of the Roses, book and LP Chrysalis 1980
- Colours, Images 1981
- A Song for Ireland, Valentine 1982
- Recital, Valentine 1983
- Live at Carnegie Hall, Valentine 1983
- Live at National Gallery Dublin, Gael-Linn 1987
- Spread a Little Happiness, Telstar 1985
- Celebration of Love, book and LP Word 1989
- World of Music, EMI 1989
- Mary O'Hara Song for Ireland, Shanachie Records 1993
- Down by the Glenside, Rykodisc 1997
- Mary O'Hara at Carnegie Hall, Sanctuary Records 2000
