= Michael Angelakos =

American musician

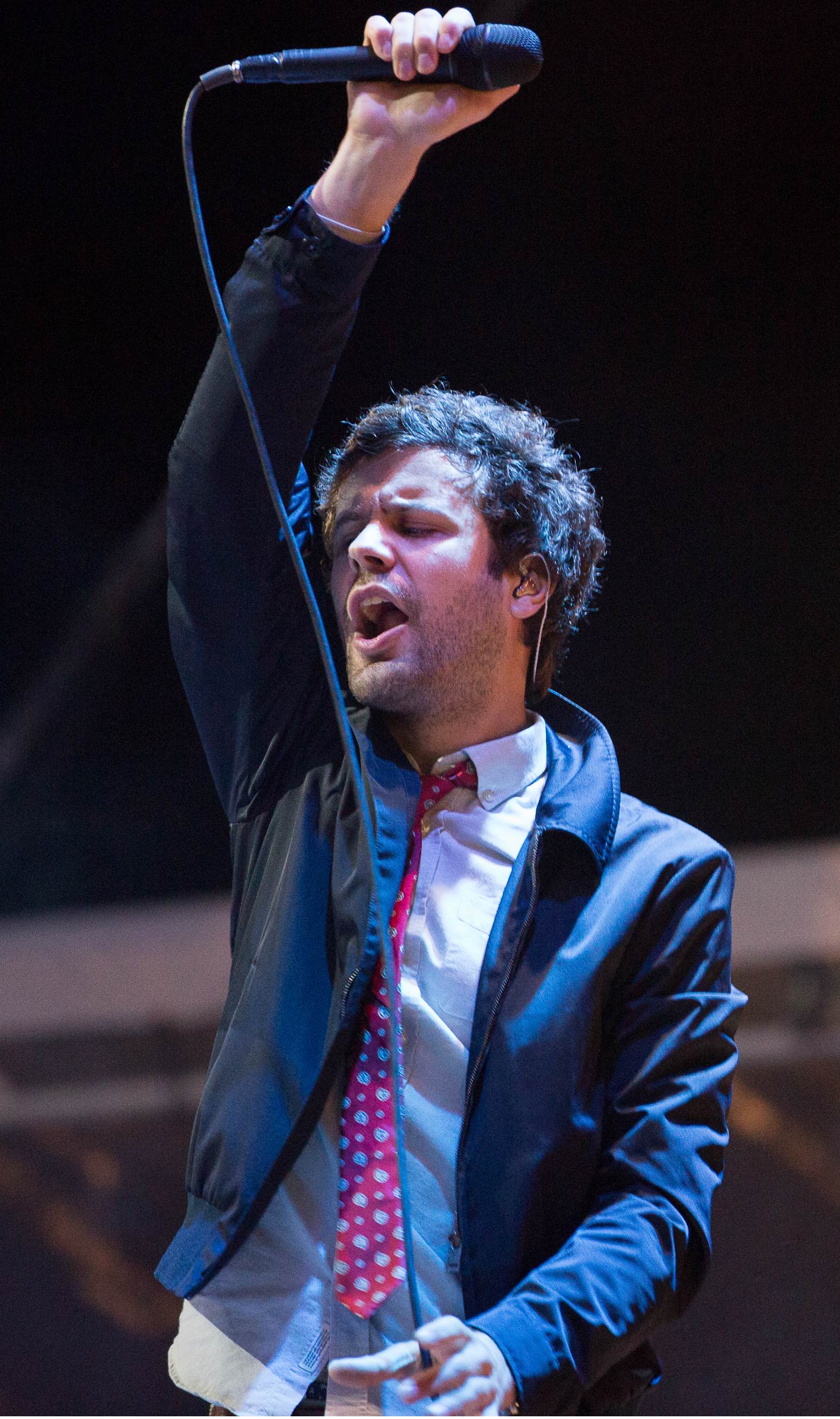
- Angelakos performing with Passion Pit at Lipton's Be More Tea Festival at Riverfront Park in North Charleston, South Carolina, in 2015

Background information
- Born: Michael John Angelakos; May 19, 1987 (age 39); New Brunswick, New Jersey, U.S.
- Origin: Boston, Massachusetts, U.S.
- Genres: Electropop; synth-pop; indie pop; indie electronic; art pop
- Occupations: Singer; songwriter; record producer; multi-instrumentalist
- Instruments: Vocals; guitar; bass guitar; synthesizer; piano
- Years active: 1999–present
- Labels: Frenchkiss; Columbia
- Member of: Passion Pit

Michael John Angelakos (born May 19, 1987) is an American musician, singer, songwriter, and record producer. He is best known as the frontman of the indietronica band Passion Pit.

== Career ==
=== Passion Pit (2008–present) ===
The first Passion Pit songs, which would later become the Chunk of Change EP, were written by Angelakos at Emerson College as a belated Valentine's Day gift to his then-girlfriend. At first, he wrote and performed all his material alone using a laptop. After one of his solo shows in the Boston area, Ian Hultquist, who was attending Berklee at the time, approached Angelakos and expressed interest in creating and playing music collaboratively. They formed a group that consisted of Angelakos, Hultquist, Ayad Al Adhamy, Thom Plasse (bass), and Adam Lavinsky (drums). The band spent a considerable amount of time trying to flesh out a collaborative format and structure that would work best for them. Jeff Apruzzese and Nate Donmoyer joined the band shortly after they signed to Frenchkiss in 2008, replacing Plasse and Lavinsky, respectively. In 2012, Adhamy was replaced by Xander Singh.

=== 2007–09: Chunk of Change ===
The band's debut EP, Chunk of Change, was released on September 16, 2008. The first four tracks were those that Angelakos had written as a gift for his girlfriend, which had already become popular throughout the Emerson College campus, where Angelakos was attending classes at the time, and had been passing out his own, self-produced copies.

The first and only single to be released from the EP, "Sleepyhead", received a good deal of exposure through its use in numerous media campaigns and advertisements, while the video for the song, directed by The Wilderness, was included on Pitchfork's Top 40 Music Videos of 2008 list. The song contains samples of "Óró Mo Bháidín" by Irish singer and harpist Mary O'Hara.

Other songs from the EP received some exposure as well. "Cuddle Fuddle" was featured in E4's second series of The Inbetweeners and "I've Got Your Number" was used in an advertisement for the cash card from O2, Money in the UK.

=== 2009–11: Manners ===
The band's first full-length studio album, Manners, was released on May 18, 2009, in the UK and May 19, 2009, in the United States and Canada. In celebration, the band played their record release party on the 18th in New York City on a Rocks Off boat cruise.

To obtain a specific background vocal accompaniment the band was looking for on Manners, Passion Pit enlisted the help of the PS22 chorus, who recorded vocals in-studio for three of the album's songs: "The Reeling", "Little Secrets", and "Let Your Love Grow Tall." "The Reeling" was the first single to be released from the album and found success on the Billboard Alternative Songs chart in the fall of 2009, where it peaked at number 34 in October and "Little Secrets" was the third single to be released and had success on the chart as well, topping out at number 39. "Let Your Love Grow Tall" was never released as a single but had some exposure being used in the sixteenth episode of the fourth season of the TV series Ugly Betty.

The album's second single, "To Kingdom Come", was used in the Rhapsody commercial for its iPhone application.

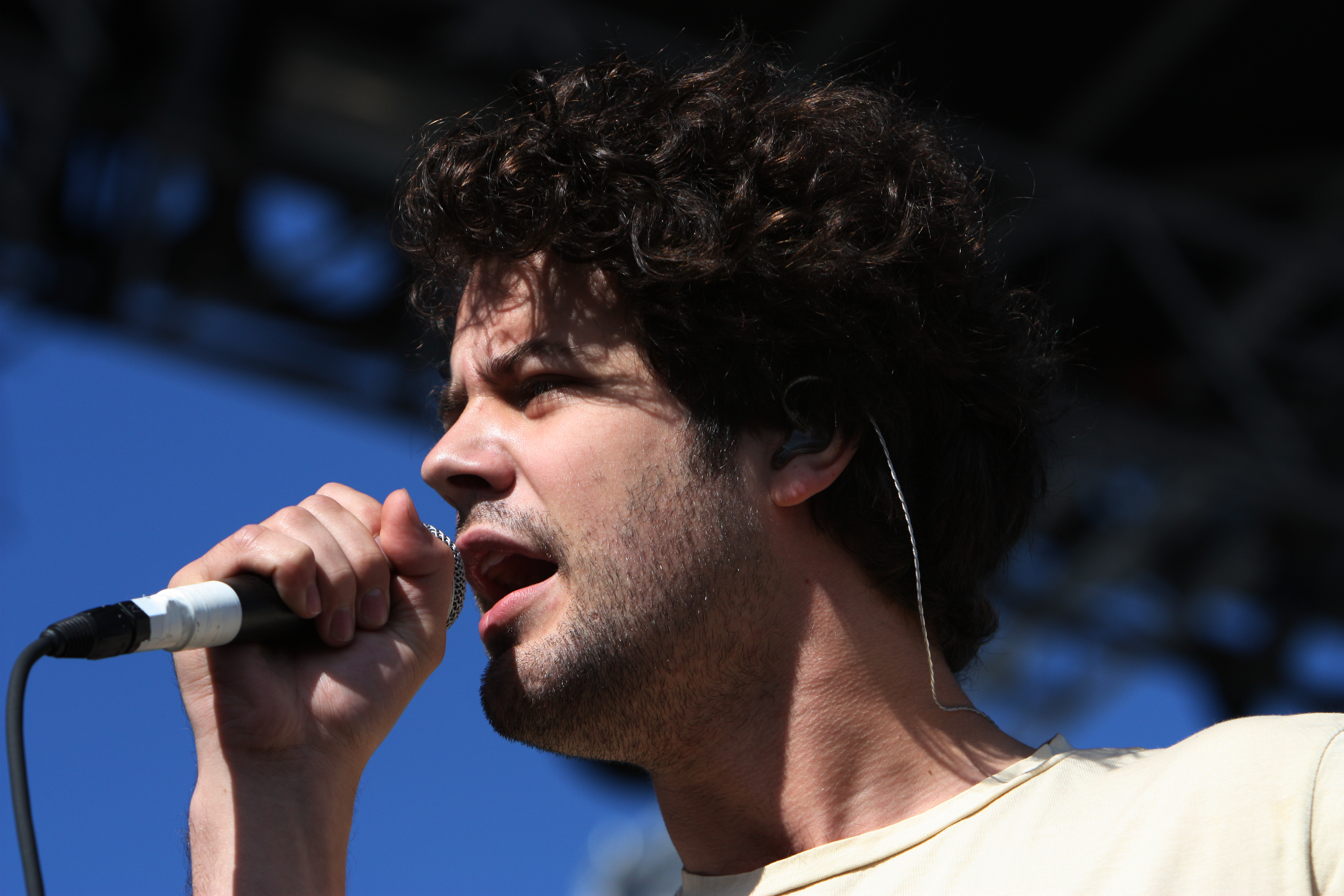
Michael Angelakos fronting Passion Pit at the Treasure Island Music Festival in 2009

"Sleepyhead" was the only track from Chunk of Change to be included on the album and was made available from iTunes for free as a discovery download in 2009. The song continued to receive additional exposure through its appearances in advertisements. It was used in a season 3 episode of the teen-drama, Skins and most recently in the debut trailer for LittleBigPlanet 2, and LittleBigPlanet 3 which led to the band's increased popularity among fans and players of the game, who eventually created an in-game instrumental version of the song to listen to in the first game. When the sequel was released, it came with the song's actual instrumental version used in the trailer.

The song "Moth's Wings" was used in the fourth episode of the third season of the CW teen drama Gossip Girl and in the closing credits of episode 36 of HBO's Big Love. It appeared in the FIFA 10 video game and was featured in the film Life as We Know It, starring Katherine Heigl and Josh Duhamel. Additionally, the track has been used as a background theme for Sky Sports' coverage of the UEFA Champions League and as the music for a dance routine in Episode 5, Season 8, of the US television show So You Think You Can Dance, which received a standing ovation from the show's judges. It was also featured in MTV's show Awkward.

In June 2009, the band performed at the Glastonbury Festival 2009 in Pilton, Somerset, England, where they dedicated the final song of their set to festival headliner Jarvis Cocker, who was to perform on the same stage later that same day. Afterwards, NME, while favorably reviewing Passion Pit's performance, incorrectly reported the band as having dedicated their entire set to Cocker.

On April 13, 2010, the band reissued Manners in a deluxe edition format which contained new artwork and three additional tracks: stripped-down versions of "Sleepyhead" and "Moth's Wings" and a cover of The Cranberries' song "Dreams". The deluxe release coincided with the extension of their North American headlining tour.

The band released another cover in June 2010, this time offering up their take on The Smashing Pumpkins hit song "Tonight, Tonight" as part of a promotion with Levi's called "Pioneer Sessions".

In September 2010, Passion Pit toured as the opening act for the English band Muse for eight shows during their fall tour through parts of the U.S. Following those supporting shows, the band headlined the Campus Consciousness Tour, produced by Pretty Polly Productions in collaboration with Guster guitarist Adam Gardner's non-profit organization Reverb. The two-week tour featured stops at twelve college campuses and, in addition to the music, focused on promoting eco-friendly lifestyles. Opening acts for the tour included Black Joe Lewis & the Honeybears and K. Flay.

=== 2011–14: Gossamer ===
In an August 2010 interview with NME, Angelakos stated that work had already begun on the follow-up to Manners and that the band intended to release the album in the spring of 2011. He then said that it will be released early in 2012, and finally that the release date was July 24.

On April 24, 2012, Angelakos announced the title of the album, Gossamer, and that it would be released on July 24, 2012.

On May 7, the first track from Gossamer was released, called "Take a Walk".

On June 12, the second track from Gossamer was released, called "I'll Be Alright". The track leaked early on June 11 and was released as an NME premiere on June 8.

On July 9, a third track from Gossamer, called "Constant Conversations", was reviewed and featured as "best new track" by Pitchfork. It was released with the review as streamed content. Gossamer was officially released on July 20, 2012.

On October 13, they performed on Saturday Night Live. They played "Take a Walk" and "Carried Away."

Angelakos, Kill The Noise and Fatman Scoop appeared on "Recess", the second single and title track from American record producer Skrillex's debut album Recess. The single was released on July 7, 2014.

=== 2015–16: Kindred and Merry Christmas, Mr. Fields ===
On January 29, it was revealed that a new album, Kindred, was in the making. The album was released on April 21.

On February 16, the official track listing was released.

From the start of 2015, to the album's release on April 21, the official Passion Pit blog released clues to the new song's lyrics and melodies in the form of Morse-encoded lyrics with the track number and time code the lyrics appeared at, and 4 – 10 seconds of melody for a select few songs.

On December 12, 2016, Angelakos announced the release of a Christmas video album, called "Merry Christmas, Mr. Fields", and its soundtrack, which was later released on December 16.

=== 2017–present: Tremendous Sea of Love ===
On March 24, 2017 the album Tremendous Sea of Love was self-released. This came one month after the album had been available for free in exchange for retweets of a tweet describing the importance of science and research.

The official release of the album was announced on July 11 to be on July 28, 2017.

== Personal life ==
At seven, he started his first band, Dead Grass, and made himself a canvas tote bag as personal merchandise, emblazoned with a painting of a meadow on fire and fake band members lying about. While living in Buffalo, he developed an appreciation for ska, forming a local ska band, Cherry Bing. He also experimented with a number of other musical ventures throughout his years at Nichols School, delving into different musical forms and composition expanding his musical acumen. During this time, he became proficient in putting his musical thoughts directly and quickly into sound. Within one hour, he wrote and recorded the music for a high school play. He performed onstage for that production, which was performed at the Fringe Festival in Scotland. While he attended Emerson College, in the 2000s, he developed a love for opera, the soprano voice, show tunes, and slowcore indie rock, continuing to compose scores for school film majors.

Angelakos married Kristina Mucci in 2013. On August 27, 2015, the couple announced that they were divorcing. In the same year, he came out as bisexual.

In August 2025, he married Madeleine Dubus, daughter of Andre Dubus.

=== Mental health ===
On July 16, 2012, Angelakos posted on the Passion Pit website that the band had canceled the remaining July 2012 tour dates and suspended the tour for Angelakos to seek ongoing treatment for bipolar disorder. A Rolling Stone interview stated that Angelakos was diagnosed at 17, and had been receiving therapy, hospital care, and medication ever since. Two days later, Pitchfork ran a cover story explaining the nature of Angelakos' health issues and its ties to Passion Pit's second album. It was revealed he was on suicide watch. On March 4, 2013, The Huffington Post reported about Angelakos' evident recovery as Passion Pit performed a sold-out show at Madison Square Garden on February 8, 2013. The article cited Angelakos as being "in one of the best places he's ever been".

Angelakos, with his company The Wishart Group, together with co-founder Bianca Campuued and neuroscientists David and Michael Wells, is working to bring changes in the music industry with regards to mental health.
