= New York Noise =

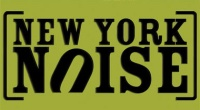
- Genre: Indie rock Music Television
- Created by: Shirley Braha
- Country of origin: United States
- No. of episodes: 89

Production
- Producer: Shirley Braha
- Editor: Shirley Braha
- Running time: 60 minutes

Original release
- Network: NYC Media
- Release: 2003 – 2009

New York Noise is a one-hour indie-rock music video television program which aired from 2003–2009 on NYC Media in New York and parts of New Jersey and Connecticut. It was created, produced, and edited by Shirley Braha and funded by New York City under the Bloomberg administration. The show was "devoted to music videos, live footage, and high jinx from bands that ride the L train." It is no longer in production since the station's rebranding in 2010, despite a petition and campaign which attempted to save it.

Notable bands and personalities that have hosted episodes include Animal Collective, Vampire Weekend, Fischerspooner, Beirut, The National, Au Revoir Simone, Aziz Ansari, Eugene Mirman, Brett Davis and more.

== Development ==
Shirley Braha, a New York native, first developed "New York Noise" in 2003 while working on her bachelor's degree at Smith College. NYC Media General Manager Arick Wierson offered Braha a show in part because of her local cred and experience." The show began airing in fall of 2003, and by the end of 2004, after NYC Media acquired channel 25 and Braha had graduated, the episodes began featuring original segments.

== Episode list ==
Season	Episodes	Originally released	
Season	Episodes	First released	Last released
1	16	TBA	TBA
2	32	TBA	TBA
3	14	TBA	TBA
4	11	TBA	TBA
5	8	TBA	TBA
6	8	TBA	TBA

=== Season 1 (2003 / 2004) ===
No. overall	No. in season	Title
1	1	"Episode 1"
Radio 4, Liars, Flaming Lips, Cat Power, Sonic Youth, Ted Leo & the Pharmacists, Walkmen, Interpol, Elefant, Ursula 1000, Client, Burnside Project, The Natural History, DJ Spooky
2	2	"Episode 2"
Luna, Ladybug Transistor, The New Pornographers, Ursula 1000, Junior Senior, Client, The Rapture, Touchdown, Interpol, Longwave, The Strokes, The Real Tuesday Weld, Sparks, Jon Spencer Blues Explosion
3	3	"Episode 3"
DJ Spooky, Schneider TM & Kpt Michigan, Burnside Project, Ivy, Britta Phillips & Dean Wareham, Yo La Tengo, Pixies, Radio 4, Interpol, Ted Leo & The Pharmacists, The Rapture, The Kills, Ex Models
4	4	"Episode 4"
Spoon, Elefant, Longwave, The Real Tuesday Weld, MC Honky, Ursula 1000, The Walkmen, Calla, Mando Diao, Sahara Hotnights, Chavez, Cat Power, Ivy, Ari-Up, Adam Green
5	5	"Episode 5"
White Magic, Luna, Flaming Lips, The Pixies, Yeah Yeah Yeahs, Jon Spencer Blues Explosion, Interpol, TV on the Radio, Schneider TM & Kpt Michigan, Spoon, Sonic Youth, Ex Models, The Rapture
6	6	"Episode 6"
Yo La Tengo, Britta Phillips & Dean Wareham, Calla, Cat Power, Stellastarr*, Adam Green, Burnside Project, Ursula 1000, MC Honky, The Real Tuesday Weld, Super Furry Animals, Spoon, Liars, Pretty Girls Make Graves, Rapture
7	7	"Episode 7"
Britta Phillips & Dean Wareham, Cat Power, Schwervon!, Schneider TM & Kpt Michigan, The Boggs, Calla, French Kicks, The Natural History, ESG, Yeah Yeah Yeahs, The Sleepy Jackson, The Strokes, Death Cab for Cutie, Stellastarr*
8	8	"Episode 8"
The Thrills, Ivy, The Sleepy Jackson, Adam Green, Yeah Yeah Yeahs, Franz Ferdinand, Ladytron, Felix Da Housecat, Ursula 1000, MC Honky, The Prosaics, Spoon, Calla, Kevin Shields
9	9	"Episode 9"
The Moldy Peaches, Spoon, The Boggs, Franz Ferdinand, Mando Diao, The Strokes, Yeah Yeah Yeahs, Junior Senior, The Real Tuesday Weld, The Pixies, The Natural History, The Oranges Band, Pretty Girls Make Graves, Interpol, The Rapture, Cat Power
10	10	"Episode 10"
The Sleepy Jackson, Radio 4, The Natural History, The Oranges Band, ESG, Pepe Deluxe, Ralph Myerz & The Jack Herren Band, Burnside Project, Franz Ferdinand, French Kicks, Seconds, Oneida, Sonic Youth, Prosaics, Cat Power, Run On
11	11	"Episode 11"
White Magic, Prosaics, ESG, My Favorite, The Thermals, The High Strung, Iron & Wine, The French Kicks
12	12	"Episode 12"
The Boggs, Chromeo, Radio 4, The Rapture, The Real Tuesday Weld, The Natural History, DJ Spooky, My Favorite, The Walkmen, The Stills, Calla
13	13	"Episode 13"
Ari-Up of The Slits, Burnside Project, !!!, My Favorite, Prosaics
14	14	"Episode 14"
The Stills, Adam Green, The Boggs, Chromeo, !!!, Joanna Newsom, Bonnie Prince Billy, My Favorite
15	15	"Episode 15"
Live footage of Jeffrey Lewis and White Magic, Radio 4, Burnside Project, The Wrens, Eltro, Cat Power, Mixel Pixel, ROTFLOL
16	16	"Episode 16"
Videos from Interpol, Prosaics, The Mazing Vids, The Moldy Peaches, My Favorite, Boyskout

=== Season 2 (2005) ===
No. overall	No. in season	Title
17	1	"Episode 17"
Ted Leo & the Pharmacists, The Concretes, Interpol, Bloc Party, Human Television, Bonnie Prince Billy, Boyskout, Animal Collective, Jeffrey Lewis, Devendra Banhart, Sparks, Moving Units, Futureheads, My Favorite, Le Tigre
18	2	"Episode 18"
CMJ 2004 Music Marathon featuring Midlake, The Russian Futurists, Poingly, Danielson feat. Sufjan Stevens, The Organ, Parker and Lily, and Smoosh
19	3	"Episode 19"
[data missing]
20	4	"Episode 20"
[data missing]
21	5	"Episode 21"
[data missing]
22	6	"Episode 22"
[data missing]
23	7	"Episode 23"
Ramones, Bloc Party, Human Television, Adem, The Walkmen, Joanna Newsom, Devendra Banhart, The Real Tuesday Weld, Fischerspooner, Brazilian Girls, Darude, LCD Soundsystem
24	8	"Episode 24"
[data missing]
25	9	"Episode 25"
Le Tigre is interviewed
26	10	"Episode 26"
Interview with Chris from CMJ, about the CMJ Music Marathon
27	11	"Episode 27"
WFMU DJ and musician Jason Forrest is interviewed, with videos from Beck, LCD Soundsystem, Röyksopp, and Kings of Convenience
28	12	"Episode 28"
The members of 33 Hz cook a turducken and perform at the NYCTV Winter Launch, with videos from Regina Spektor, Annie, Emiliana Torrini, Sonic Youth, and Supersystem
29	13	"Episode 29"
International whistling champion Steve \"the Whistler\" Herbst gives whistled renditions of songs by Adam Green, M.I.A., My Favorite, The Postal Service, and Jens Lekman, with videos from The National, Dirty Projectors, and Aberfeldy
30	14	"Episode 30"
Animal Collective is interviewed at a cupcake shop, with videos from Ariel Pink, Suburban Kids with Biblical Names, Devendra Banhart, and Matisyahu
31	15	"Episode 31"
Tommy Ramone sips tea and talks about the Ramones documentary, End of the Century, with videos from Fischerspooner, My Favorite, and Brazilian Girls
32	16	"Episode 32"
The National is interviewed, plus videos from Bright Eyes, Sleater-Kinney, Annie, and The Shout Out Louds
33	17	"Episode 33"
Fischerspooner is interviewed, plus videos from ESG, Sonic Youth, Beck, Matisyahu, Enon, and Talking Heads
34	18	"Episode 34"
Ben Goldberg of The Leaf Label listens to top 40 music for 30 days straight to investigate the harmful effects, plus videos from M.I.A., Solvent, Antony & the Johnsons, and Caribou
35	19	"Episode 35"
Kids judge videos by Sparks, The Real Tuesday Weld, Suburban Kids With Biblical Names, and Adam Green
36	20	"Episode 36"
My Favorite gives summer reading recommendations from the New York Public Library, with performances from SXSW (by Voxtrot, LCD Soundsystem, M.I.A., Dirty on Purpose, Hot Chip, Kings of Convenience, and Ariel Pink), and videos from Emiliana Torrini, Jennifer Gentle, Iron & Wine
37	21	"Episode 37"
Trachtenburg Family Slideshow Players host from their East Village apartment, with music videos from M83, Spoon, The Arcade Fire, Mr. Scruff, and Interpol
38	22	"Episode 38"
Man Parrish & Richard Barone talk about Klaus Nomi, with footage from the documentary, The Nomi Song, as well as videos by Architecture in Helsinki, Of Montreal, The Cloud Room, and LCD Soundsystem
39	23	"Episode 39"
Hosts Carl Newman of the New Pornographers, and Dave Martin at the Beggars Group 10th Anniversary, with cameos by Fred Armisen, and Dean Wareham, plus videos from the Beggars Group catalogue, including The New Pornographers, The Double, Calla, The Avalanches, M/A/R/R/S, Cocteau Twins, Charlatans, and The Pixies
40	24	"Episode 40"
An inside look at the first Willie Mae Rock Camp For Girls, plus videos from Dirty on Purpose, Stars, Sons & Daughters, The Legends, and OK Go
41	25	"Episode 41"
Hosts Eugene Mirman & Langhorne Slim hand out fried scallops, highlights from the New York Noise CMJ Showcase with Au Revoir Simone and Mahogany, along with other CMJ clips featuring The Besties, Of Montreal, The Hold Steady, Why?, Tomorrow's Friend, The Castanets, Skeletons & the Girl-Faced Boys, The Gossip, Blood on the Wall, and Test-Icicles
42	26	"Episode 42"
Bishop Allen host a rooftop barbecue along with Funny Ha Ha director Andrew Bujalski, plus videos from Mates of State, CocoRosie, Sleater-Kinney, Spoon, Bloc Party, Out Hud, Smog, and The Fiery Furnaces
43	27	"Episode 43"
Oneida gives a tour of their studio, plus videos from Jason Forrest, Antony & The Johnsons, Shout Out Louds, Mother and the Addicts, The Peachwaves, and Goblin Cock
44	28	"Episode 44"
"WFMU Record Fair" with radio personalities Brian Turner, DJ Trouble, OCDJ, Small Change, and Mac of Antique Phonograph, plus Brian Turner shares videos from Afrirampo, Lightning Bolt, The Fall, Serge Gainsbourg, Captain Beefheart, Devo, and Deerhoof
45	29	"Episode 45"
Aziz Ansari & Rob Huebel portray Pitchfork Media's Thadius P. Scornburner and Nigel P. Radcliffe at the Upright Citizens Brigade Theatre, plus videos from Pinback, My Morning Jacket, Devendra Banhart, Pavement, Chalets, Bloc Party, Burnside Project, LCD Soundsystem, and The Go! Team
46	30	"Episode 46"
J from The Cloud Room and Nicole Atkins go on a blind date, plus videos from Wolf Parade, Grizzly Bear, Bright Lights, Beat Happening, The Knife, and Matt Pond PA
47	31	"Episode 47"
The Hold Steady perform at The Variety Club Boys & Girls Club of Queens, plus videos from Ivy, The Clientele, The Magic Numbers, Pia Fraus, Snoozer, Sons & Daughters, Cornelius, No-Neck Blues Band, Talking Heads, The Double, Bright Eyes, The Bats, and Run On
48	32	"Episode 48"
Highlights from previous episodes and the best videos of 2005, including The National, Jason Forrest, M.I.A., The Go! Team, and Out Hud

=== Season 3 (2006) ===
No. overall	No. in season	Title
49	1	"Episode 49"
Aziz Ansari hosts the 2006 PLUG Awards, with appearances by TV on the Radio, The National, Beans, Holy Fuck, Celebration, Emiliana Torrini, Chad VanGaalen Claire and Patrick from OhMyRockness.com, Jack Rabid of Big Takeover, and Nick Sylvester.
50	2	"Episode 50"
Walter Kuhr of The Main Squeeze Orchestra is interviewed, with videos from Envelopes, Of Montreal, Gogol Bordello, The Cloud Room, The Walkmen, Test Icicles, Liars, Burnside Project, Annie, Phofo, Ezra Reich, and The Peachwaves.
51	3	"Episode 51"
Adam Green hosts "The Adam Green Variety Hour" with guests Jenny Lewis, Rogue Wave, Jeffrey Lewis, Kimya Dawson, Animal Collective, The Strokes, Langhorne Slim, Mr. Scruff, Human Television, and The Knife.
52	4	"Episode 52"
SXSW 2006 with Ted Leo, Art Brut, Aziz Ansari & Paul Scheer, Ryan Schreiber from Pitchfork Media, Serena Maneesh, Calla, Clap Your Hands Say Yeah, and Au Revoir Simone, with performances by The New Pornographers, Joggers, Love Is All, Clap Your Hands Say Yeah, Matt & Kim, Meneguar, Psychic Ills, The Boy Least Likely To, Belle & Sebastian, and Afrirampo, with videos from Baby Dayliner, The Go! Team, Pizzicato Five, Shugo Tokumaru, Arctic Monkeys, Menomena, and Ivy League.
53	5	"Episode 53"
Simon Reynolds, author of "Rip It Up and Start Again: A History of Post-Punk" is interviewed while people get "post-punk haircuts", with videos from Talking Heads, Orange Juice, OMD, Klaus Nomi, A Certain Ratio, ESG, Josef K, Franz Ferdinand, Monochrome Set, Devo, and The Raincoats.
54	6	"Episode 54"
Kids critique music videos by The Cloud Room, Ezra Reich, LCD Soundsystem, The Knife, Blondie, Phofo, Animal Collective, and Arctic Monkeys.
55	7	"Episode 55"
The Walkmen are interviewed, with videos from Fischerspooner, DJ Spooky, Jason Forrest, We Are Scientists, Spoon, Neko Case, Band of Horses, Dirty on Purpose, and Serena Maneesh.
56	8	"Episode 56"
The Fiery Furnaces join up with the FDNY at Ladder 54 Engine 8 for a fire safety lesson, with videos from Irving, The Futureheads, Kelley Stoltz, Islands, Sonic Youth, The Rogers Sisters, The Presets, The Real Tuesday Weld, and They Might Be Giants.
57	9	"Episode 57"
"Ms. New York" Staci Shands interviews Art Brut, The Cribs, Stars, Rogers Sisters, Tapes 'N Tapes, Dirty on Purpose, Man Man, Serena Maneesh at the 2006 Siren Festival, with videos from Dirty on Purpose, Tapes N Tapes, Islands, Rogers Sisters, and Hot Chip.
58	10	"Episode 58"
"Making the Video" with Beirut at the Sweet N’ Low sugar factory, with videos from Jamie Lidell, Feist, Regina Spektor, José González, TV on the Radio, Kudu, Spank Rock, Figurines, The Spinto Band, I'm From Barcelona, Suburban Kids with Biblical Names, and The Besties.
59	11	"Episode 59"
Live performances by Saturday Looks Good to Me, Mobius Band, Human Television, Meneguar, and Fallen Angel Crying at the East River Music Project, along with videos from Field Music, Mates of State, Oliver Laric, Camera obscura, Broken Social Scene, Yeah Yeah Yeahs, Supersystem, Services, and Psapp.
60	12	"Episode 60"
A comparative study between the Willie Mae Rock Camp for Girls and Ethel's Music Camp, plus videos from Plastic Operator, Dr. Octagon, Asobi Seksu, Dick & Dee Dee, Michael Leviton, El Perro Del Mar, Klaxons, Dan Deacon, Danielson, Sonic Youth, Dungen, Art Brut, Arctic Monkeys, and The Cribs.
61	13	"Episode 61"
An inside look at the 2006 Pitchfork Music Festival with Aesop Rock, The Mountain Goats, The Futureheads, CSS, Yo La Tengo, Fred Armisen, and roving fruit correspondent Ted Leo, with videos from The Heavy Blinkers, Pavement, Beirut, and M. Ward.
62	14	"Episode 62"
"My SuperSweet Barmitzvah" with Michael Leviton, plus videos from The Spinto Band, Tom Vek, The Strokes, Locksley, The Thermals, Art Brut, Klaxons, Klaus Nomi, José González, Menomena, Oliver Laric, Ralph Myerz & Jack Herren Band, and Hot Chip.

=== Season 4 (2007) ===
No. overall	No. in season	Title
63	1	"Episode 63"
MC Steinberg interviews The Shins, The Rapture, Girl Talk, The Presets, Hot Chip, Forward, Russia!, The Knife, and Tokyo Police Club at the 2006 CMJ Music Festival.
64	2	"Episode 64"
"Disability Mentoring Day" behind the scenes of DFA Records, Insound.com, and Time Out NY, plus videos from The Rapture, LCD Soundsystem, Goldfrapp, Moby, CSS, TV on the Radio, Band of Horses, Tahiti 80 and The Knife.
65	3	"Episode 65"
Antique Rockshow at the WFMU Record Fair, with music videos from Human Television, Saturday Looks Good To Me, The Magnetic Fields, Stephen Malkmus, Danielson, Animal Collective, Barbara Morgenstern, The Embassy, The Tough Alliance, Dr. Octagon, Yeah Yeah Yeahs and Talking Heads.
66	4	"Episode 66"
Senior citizens judge music videos by The Hold Steady and Albert Hammond Jr., Of Montreal, Nicole Atkins, Dr. Dog, and The Knife.
67	5	"Episode 67"
Peggy & Roy go head to head in the New York Noise Blogger War at SXSW, featuring interviews with Peter Bjorn & John, Voxtrot, The Pipettes, Menomena, Dan Deacon, Matt & Kim, Fujiya & Miyagi, and more.
68	6	"Episode 68"
New York Noise's executive board takes over the show, with appearances from Andrew Thompson and Oxford Collapse.
69	7	"Episode 69"
Battles learn non-violent communication with Dr. Dian Killian.
70	8	"Episode 70"
Devlin & Darko of Spank Rock at the Big Apple Circus.
71	9	"Episode 71"
Jeffrey Lewis hosts with his parents.
72	10	"Episode 72"
The National tours the United Nations building.
73	11	"Episode 73"
Apples in Stereo in Central Park.

=== Season 5 (2008) ===
No. overall	No. in season	Title
74	1	"Episode 74"
Vampire Weekend tours Morningside Heights, Au Revoir Simone begins the weekly New York Noise VJ Search 2008, a CMJ fashion report, an interview with Liars, an exclusive performance by Simian Mobile Disco recorded live at the KEXP CMJ broadcast, and music videos from The Thermals, My Teenage Stride, Hot Chip, Ra Ra Riot, Digitalism, New Young Pony Club, Love of Diagrams, O'Death, Vampire Weekend, Liars.
75	2	"Episode 75"
Yeasayer interview and performance on KEXP, behind the scenes of a Ladybug Transistor video, interviews with Mark Ronson and The Black Kids, the New York Noise VJ Search, and videos from The Dodos, Au Revoir Simone, Shout Out Louds, Super Furry Animals, MGMT, Jeremy Jay, CSS, Holy Hail, and Jamie T.
76	3	"Episode 76"
Tim Harrington of Les Savy Fav celebrates Hanukkah, The Harlem Shakes perform on KEXP, interviews with Jens Lekman, Klaxons, and Vampire Weekend, and videos from Dr. Dog, Panda Bear, The Helio Sequence, Les Savy Fav, Imani, Of Montreal, and Cut Copy.
77	4	"Episode 77"
An interview and KEXP live performance from The Hold Steady, and interviews with Les Savy Fav, New York Noise VJ Search, and videos from Adam Green, The Go! Team, The Mountain Goats, Parts & Labor, Evangelicals, The Long Blondes, and Pete & The Pirates.
78	5	"Episode 78"
Record shopping with Mark Ronson and Peter Moren, interviews with Pinback and Klaxons, Le Loup live on KEXP, and videos from Andrew Thompson, The Sea and Cake, Basia Bulat, Headlights, Au Revoir Simone, The Clientele, MGMT, Klaxons, and Love of Diagrams.
79	6	"Episode 79"
Interviews with Sons and Daughters, Vampire Weekend, Les Savy Fav and "Patty Pitchfork", and videos from The Ruby Suns, The Shins, This Is Ivy League, Cut Off Your Hands, Someone Still Loves You Boris Yeltsin, The Black Lips, King Khan, The Teenagers, LCD Soundsystem, Band of Horses, and The Mae Shi.
80	7	"Episode 80"
A Les Savy Fav apartment tour, a fashion update with Yeasayer, an interview with Simian Mobile Disco, and videos from The Go! Team, Kid Sister, Metronomy, Justice, Tilly & the Wall, The Spinto Band, M83, Tunng, Thao and the Get Down Stay Down, Animal Collective, and Prinzhorn Dance School.
81	8	"Episode 81"
Interviews with Interpol, Ladybug Transistor, a recap of SXSW 2008 (featuring High Places, She & Him, The Ruby Suns, Fleet Foxes, and Cut Copy) and videos from Goldfrapp, Lykke Li, Múm, Noah & the Whale, Santogold, Tegan & Sara, Hot Chip, Hercules & Love Affair, The Presets, Meneguar, Health, The Death Set, and Ungdomskulen.

=== Season 6 (2009) ===
No. overall	No. in season	Title
82	1	"Episode 82"
Adam Green interviews The Vaselines, Vivian Girls perform, plus Thurston Moore. Music videos from: Cause Co-motion, The Pains of Being Pure at Heart, Ladyhawke, Passion Pit, Empire of the Sun, Still Flyin', Of Montreal, Blondie, Animal Collective, No Age, and Little Joy.
83	2	"Episode 83"
MC Steinberg interviews The Pains of Being Pure At Heart, a Pavement "pop-up" video, the Real Housewives of New York Noise, Farusha the Psychic and Thurston Moore. Music videos from: Bush Tetras, Animal Collective, The Tough Alliance, Miami Horror, M83, Vampire Weekend, Abe Vigoda, Surf City, Matt & Kim, Crystal Stilts, and AU.
84	3	"Episode 84"
"Cribs" with Chairlift, Woods performs, Adam Green, Friendly Fires, and Lykke Li. Music videos from: Here We Go Magic, Violens, Foals, The Go-Betweens, Ra Ra Riot, Chairlift, and CSS.
85	4	"Episode 85"
MC Steinberg interviews Takka Takka, the Real Housewives of New York Noise, Thurston Moore & Byron Coley, Fahrusha the Psychic, The Soft Pack and Adam Green. Music videos from: Stereolab, Bricolage, Devo, Nancy Sinatra, Vivian Girls, Telepathe, Nite Jewel, Violent Femmes, Band of Horses, Soft Pack, Fleet Foxes, Band of Horses, Wild Beasts, Violent Femmes & Prefab Sprout.
86	5	"Episode 86"
MC Steinberg interviews Woods, the Kids Korner, Fahrusha the Psychic, The Real Housewives of New York Noise, and Thurston Moore. Music videos from: Pete & The Pirates, Stephen Malkmus, Peter Bjorn & John, Sebastien Tellier, Metronomy, MGMT, Beach House, Beirut, Woods, Pere Ubu, and My Bloody Valentine.
87	6	"Episode 87"
The Futureheads talk to Fahrusha, Hercules & Love Affair perform live, Adam Green, Thurston Moore & Byron Colley. Music videos from: Department of Eagles, The Presets, Vetiver, Starfucker, Bishop Allen, Andrew Thompson, Dent May
88	7	"Episode 88"
Live footage of The Pains of Being Pure at Heart & Deerhoof, MC Steinberg (aka Brett Davis) talks to The King Khan & BBQ Show, The Real Housewives of New York Noise, Lykke Li. Music videos from: Those Dancing Days, School of Seven Bells, Benoit Pouilard, Girls, Casiokids, El Guincho, Sebastian Tellier, Metronomy, Micachu & The Shapes, Ariel Pink, Teenage Jesus and the Jerks & Vampire Weekend.
89	8	"Episode 89"
Vivian Girls perform live, Love Is All give love advice, an interview with Chairlift and a SXSW 2009 roundup with clips of The Beets, Box Elders, Thao & The Get Down Stay Down, Micachu & The Shapes, Kurt Vile, Woods, and Blank Dogs. Music videos from: Ducktails, Crystal Antlers, Camera obscura, The Pains of Being Pure at Heart, Chairlift, Fever Ray, Parenthetical Girls, Shy Child, Marnie Stern, The Sea and Cake and Galaxie 500.
