= Transparent Things =

Transparent Things may refer to:

- Transparent Things (album), a 2006 album by Fujiya & Miyagi
- Transparent Things (novel), a 1972 novel by Vladimir Nabokov
