= Richard Jankovich =

American entrepreneur, Musician

- Born: 7 August 1972 (age 54)
- Known for: Entrepreneur, Musician, Author
- Notable work: Shoplifter, B(R)ANDS Music Branding, Burnside Project, Pocket, Big Mother Gig, Mon Draggor

Richard Jankovich (born 7 August 1972) is an American entrepreneur, musician and author in Los Angeles. He runs the music promotion company Shoplifter. Founded in 2013, Shoplifter provides record labels and artists with a variety of promotional channels. Known primarily for In-Store Radio/Overhead Music campaigns, Shoplifter has worked over 2,000 releases for artists such as Billie Eilish, Boygenius, Olivia Rodrigo, Kelly Clarkson, U2, 5 Seconds Of Summer, OneRepublic, Imagine Dragons, Dayglow, Charlie Puth, Coldplay, Jennifer Lopez and others. Clients include Universal Music Group, Warner Music Group, Sony Music, Beggars Group, Secretly Canadian, Hollywood Records and more.

Jankovich's musical acts include Long A, Burnside Project, Big Mother Gig, Pocket and Mon Draggor. His releases have been covered by Rolling Stone, Spin, Pitchfork, Stereogum, Billboard, NPR, BrooklynVegan and more. A sync licensing stalwart, his songs have appeared in movies like The Medallion, Pink Skies Ahead, Ira and Abby and Seamless as well as countless television programs on NBC, CBS, ABC and MTV including the theme song for Showtime's Queer as Folk.

As a musician, he has collaborated with Britta Phillips, Aloe Blacc, Robyn Hitchcock, Tanya Donelly, Steve Kilbey, Mark Burgess, Dave Smalley, Craig Wedren, Rick Moody, Of Montreal, Dicky Barrett, Kristin Hersh, Glen Phillips, and more. His songs and remixes have been released by Bar/None Records, Sony Records, Polyvinyl Record Co., Tirk Recordings, China Record Corporation, Friendly Fire Recordings and 24 Hour Service Station as well as his own imprint, Fraga Music/Sweet Sweet Records.

In 2013, his first book Hit Brands: How Music Builds Value For The World's Smartest Brands was released on Palgrave Macmillan. He has lectured at University of Southern California and spoken at South by Southwest.

== Biography ==
Jankovich attended Marquette University in Milwaukee in the 1990s where he formed the alternative rock band, Big Mother Gig. They released 2 LPs and 1 EP and played over 150 concerts around the Midwest before breaking up in 1996 when Jankovich moved to New York City. In 1999, he founded Burnside Project while working in music licensing and advertising. Burnside Project released 4 albums on Bar/None Records and Sony Music Entertainment Japan and their 2003 track "Cue The Pulse To Begin" was the theme song for Queer as Folk on Showtime. Burnside Project received critical acclaim from Rolling Stone and Spin and were nominated by Cameron Crowe for a Shortlist Award.

In 2005, Jankovich began remixing under the name Pocket and released his first remix in 2005 to critical blog acclaim. Many of his subsequent remixes have received positive critical reviews from websites such as Stereogum, Pitchfork and Pampelmoose. In 2007, Pocket's remix for Radiohead's cover of Björk's "Unravel" was nominated for the 2007 Village Voice Pazz and Jop poll by Will Hermes. In 2009, Pocket began releasing a series of singles which Pitchfork called "an impressive guest list" including guest singers like Robyn Hitchcock, Craig Wedren (Shudder to Think), Steve Kilbey (The Church), Danny Seim (Menomena) and Mark Burgess (The Chameleons). In 2012, these singles were collected on an album, All of This Happened, released on Tirk Records. Pocket admits the name was bestowed upon him by Brooklyn Vegan when the blog posted his Joanna Newsom "Bridges and Balloons (Pocket Mix)" and referred to him directly as Pocket.

In 2008, Jankovich moved to Los Angeles and continued to make music as Pocket and Mon Draggor while working at in-store music providers like Mood Media. Mon Draggor's double LP Pulling Strings/Pushing Buttons was selected as 9th best album of 2015 by PopMatters.

In 2013, he launched Shoplifter. Shoplifter specializes in helping artists and record labels get their songs placed into playlists that accompany the shopping experience (i.e. overhead or in-store music.)

In 2016, Burnside Project released the previously shelved album Syntax and Semantics (recorded in 2004) on Bar/None Records. In 2017, Big Mother Gig returned with a new EP and began performing live. In 2018, Pocket released 5 EPs of unreleased songs and remixes with Robyn Hitchcock, Tanya Donelly (Belly), Yuki Chikudate (Asobi Seksu), Vic Godard (Subway Sect), Dave Smalley (Dag Nasty), Styrofoam, Mux Mool, Mount Sims, RemoteTreeChildren and Glen Phillips (Toad The Wet Sprocket).

In February 2021, Big Mother Gig announced their new LP Gusto on Stereogum and released the first single, "The Underdog" featuring Leah Wellbaum of Slothrust. Gusto was released on 30 April 2021, to positive reviews by Stereogum, NPR, American Songwriter, BrooklynVegan and more. In the Fall of 2021, the band supported the album with a 3-week US tour opening for Black Joe Lewis & the Honeybears.

In 2023, Burnside Project member Paul Searing died unexpectedly, and the band officially broke up after releasing their final single "Ancient Artifact" in 2024. In November 2024, Big Mother Gig announced their dissolution and Jankovich announced a new act called Long A with fellow Big Mother Gig member Albert Kurniawan. Long A released their debut LP, 2025's It’s About To Start, a collaborative collection featuring Tanya Donelly, Ben Lee, Gothic Tropic and others. The duo then completed a West Coast tour in early 2026 in support of the record.

== Works ==
=== Music: LPs & EPs ===
Long A

- Long A "It's About To Start" (2025, Industry Houseplant Records)

Burnside Project:

- Burnside Project "Syntax & Semantics" (2016, Bar/None Records)
- Burnside Project "The Finest Example Is You" (2005, Bar/None Records)
- Burnside Project "The Networks, the Circuits, the Streams, the Harmonies" (2003 Bar/None Records / Sony DefSTAR Japan)
- Burnside Project "Burnside Project" (2000, Fraga)

Big Mother Gig:

- Big Mother Gig "Gusto" (2021, Sweet Sweet)
- Big Mother Gig "No More Questions" (2018, Sweet Sweet)
- Big Mother Gig "Almost Primed EP" (2017, Sweet Sweet)
- Big Mother Gig "Quintessentially Average: 92-96" (2016, Sweet Sweet)
- Big Mother Gig "Smiling Politely" (1996, Fraga)
- Big Mother Gig "Transition EP" (1994, Fraga)
- Big Mother Gig "My Social Commentary" (1993, Fraga)

Pocket (musician):

- Pocket "VLT A", "VLT B", "VLT C", "VLT D", "VLT E" EPs (2018, Fraga)
- Pocket "All Of This Happened" (2012, Tirk)
- Pocket "Singles" (2009, 24 Hour Service Station)

Mon Draggor:

- Mon Draggor "Passing Time, Picking Bones" (2018, Fraga)
- Mon Draggor "Pushing Buttons" (2015, Fraga)
- Mon Draggor "Pulling Strings" (2015, Fraga)

=== Music: Notable Remixes as Pocket (musician) ===
- "Nine O'Clock in France (Pocket vs. Ray Ketchem Mix)" - Elk City (2010)
- "My Beautiful Girl (Tokyo) (Pocket Mix)" - XO (2009)
- "Blood Pressurize (Pocket Mix)" - RemoteTreeChildren (2009)
- "Your Friends (Pocket Mix)" - Faux Hoax (2009)
- "We're Here to Save the Day (Pocket Mix)" - The Constellations featuring Asher Roth (2009)
- "Gamma Ray (Pocket Mix)" - Beck (2008)
- "Slippershell (Pocket Mix)" - Kristin Hersh (2008)
- "Lost My Taste (Pocket Mix)" - Mendoza Line (2008)
- "Unravel (Pocket Mix)" - Radiohead (2007)
- "Cherries in the Snow (Pocket Mix)" - Elk City (2007)
- "Marfa Lights (Pocket Mix)" - Dirty on Purpose (2006)
- "How Lester Lost His Wife (Pocket Mix)" - Of Montreal (2006)
- "Hate (Pocket Mix)" - Cat Power (2006)
- "My Lady Story (Pocket Mix)" - Antony and The Johnsons (2005)
- "Bridges and Balloons (Pocket Mix)" - Joanna Newsom (2005)

=== Books ===
- Hit Brands: How Music Builds Value For The World's Smartest Brands (2013), Palgrave MacMillan
