= Transparent Things (album) =

Studio album by Fujiya & Miyagi
- Released: May 2006
- Studios: Church Road, Hove, UK
- Genres: Electronic; krautrock; dance-punk
- Length: 36:21
- Label: Tirk
- Producer: Fujiya & Miyagi

Fujiya & Miyagi chronology
Electro Karaoke in the Negative Style (2003)	Transparent Things (2006)	Lightbulbs (2008)

Professional ratings
Aggregate scores
Source	Rating
Metacritic	79/100
Review scores
Source	Rating
AllMusic	3.5/5 stars
Observer Music Monthly	4/5 stars
Pitchfork Media	8.3/10
Prefix Magazine	8.0/10
Stylus Magazine	B+

Transparent Things is the second studio album by British band Fujiya & Miyagi, released in May 2006 by Tirk. It was re-released in 2007 by Deaf Dumb & Blind Communications in the US, with different artwork and the bonus track "Reeboks in Heaven".

The title of the album comes from Vladimir Nabokov's 1972 novel of the same name.

== Track listing ==
All tracks are written by Fujiya & Miyagi unless otherwise stated.

No.	Title	Writer(s)	Length
1.	"Ankle Injuries"	Fujiya & Miyagi; Matt Collins	5:04
2.	"Collarbone"		4:03
3.	"Photocopier"		4:05
4.	"Conductor 71"		4:09
5.	"Transparent Things"		2:55
6.	"Sucker Punch"	Fujiya & Miyagi; Matt Avery; Matt Collins	2:40
7.	"In One Ear & Out the Other"		3:43
8.	"Cassettesingle"		6:31
9.	"Cylinders"		3:06

US bonus track
No.	Title	Writer(s)	Length
10.	"Reeboks in Heaven"	Fujiya & Miyagi; Matt Avery	2:21

Japan bonus tracks
No.	Title	Length
9.	"Skinny Little Punk"	3:14
10.	"Electro Karaoke in Negative Styles"	6:22
11.	"Cylinders"	3:06

== Personnel ==
=== Fujiya & Miyagi ===
- David Best – vocals, guitar, Moog synthesizer
- Steve Lewis – keyboards, beats, programming
- Matt Hainsby – bass guitar

=== Technical personnel ===
- Julian Tardo – recording
- Alan Boorman – mixing

== Charts ==
Chart (2007)	Peak position
UK Dance Albums (Official Charts)	25
