= Shirley Braha =

American television producer

- Born: December 26, 1982 (age 43); New York City, United States
- Occupations: Television producer, TV program creator, music label founder
- Known for: owner of Marnie the Dog

Shirley Braha (born December 26, 1982) is the adoptive owner of popular internet dog Marnie the Dog. She has also been a TV producer and creator of the music television show New York Noise (2003–2010) and MTV Hive's indie music video show Weird Vibes (2011–2013).

== Early life ==
Braha is a native of the New York City borough of Brooklyn. At 16, she started a record label called Little Shirley Beans Records. From 2001-2002 she was programming co-director for the streaming internet radio site indiepopradio.com At Smith College, Braha was a DJ at WOZQ and their Events Director. In 2001, Braha was featured in YM Magazine as "One of the 21 Coolest Girls in America". The Village Voice named her "Best D.I.Y. Go Girl Under 21" in their 2002 "Best of NYC" issue.

== New York Noise (2003–2010) ==
Braha created New York Noise, an indie-rock TV show, in 2003 while interning at NYC Media. " She produced & edited the series. The program showcased underground music in unusual ways. Her production style "brought much needed originality to her field" according to the Village Voice. According to The New York Times, it is "a groundbreaking show that has attracted a loyal following "

== Weird Vibes (2011–2013) ==
Shirley Braha was creator & producer of "Weird Vibes," a 30-minute indie music video show she developed for MTV Hive. The show ran from August 2011 to September 2013.

== Marnie the Dog (2012–2020) ==
Braha adopted an elderly Shih Tzu dog on December 20, 2012, and named her Marnie. Marnie became quite a celebrity when Braha began regularly posting photos of her on Instagram and Twitter, as well as video's on Vine in February 2014. Marnie died on March 5, 2020.
