= The Cloud Room (album) =

Studio album by The Cloud Room
- Released: April 19, 2005
- Recorded: November–December 2004
- Studio: Gigantic Studios, NYC
- Genre: Pop rock
- Length: 32:17
- Label: Gigantic Records
- Producer: Chris Zane

The Cloud Room chronology
The Cloud Room (2005)	Please Don't Almost Kill Me (2007)

Professional ratings
Review scores
Source	Rating
AllMusic	3/5 stars
Pitchfork	6.6/10
The Skinny	4/5 stars

The Cloud Room is the first album by the Cloud Room, released in 2005. Stuart Mason of AllMusic called the opening track and lead single, "Hey Now Now", "one of the great alt-pop singles of the first half of 2005.". The song was also used in advertising for the carbonated drink Pepsi.

== Track listing ==
- All tracks are composed by the Cloud Room.
1. "Hey Now Now"
2. "Waterfall"
3. "Blackout!"
4. "Devoured in Peace"
5. "Sunlight Song"
6. "Beautiful Mess"
7. "The Hunger"
8. "Oh My Love"
9. "Blue Jean"
10. "Sunlight Reprise"
11. "We Sleep in the Ocean"

== Reception ==
Jason Crock of Pitchfork stated "Stop me if you think you've heard this one before: A band from New York City comes from nowhere to release a dynamite single with just the right mix of hip 80s influences, gets the press talking, gets a sliver of radio play, performs at SXSW, and finally releases an album that fails to live up to that first three minutes of excitement." Gwennie von Einsiedel of The Skinny wrote "It is pop at its unselfconscious best and should without doubt be at the forefront of its genre".
