= Slight Variations =

Studio album by Fujiya & Miyagi
- Released: 30 September 2022
- Length: 35:11
- Label: Impossible Objects of Desire

Fujiya & Miyagi chronology
Flashback (2019)	Slight Variations (2022)

Professional ratings
Aggregate scores
Source	Rating
Metacritic	79/100
Review scores
Source	Rating
AllMusic	4/5 stars
Beats Per Minute	64%
God Is in the TV	9/10
MusicOMH	4/5 stars

Slight Variations is the ninth studio album by English band Fujiya & Miyagi. It was released on 30 September 2022 by Impossible Objects of Desire label.

== Background ==
On 16 July 2022, Fujiya & Miyagi announced the release of their new studio album, along with the first single "Digital Hangover".

== Critical reception ==
Slight Variations was met with "generally favorable" reviews from critics. At Metacritic, which assigns a weighted average rating out of 100 to reviews from mainstream publications, this release received an average score of 79, based on 5 reviews.

Writing for AllMusic, Marcy Donelson wrote: "Intended as a stylistic retrospective of sorts, as well as a nod to where they might be headed, it incorporates Krautrock, dub, disco, house, and art pop influences, among others, often converging multiple elements on sleek, effortless-sounding tracks.

=== Accolades ===
Publications' year-end list appearances for Slight Variations
Critic/Publication	List	Rank	Ref
God Is in the TV	God Is in the TV's Top 25 Albums of 2022	32	

== Track listing ==
Slight Variations track listing
No.	Title	Length
1.	"Slight Variations"	3:32
2.	"Non-Essential Worker"	4:05
3.	"Sweat"	3:12
4.	"New Body Language"	3:03
5.	"Digital Hangover"	3:01
6.	"Flux"	4:24
7.	"FAQ"	4:01
8.	"Olympian Heights"	2:45
9.	"Oops"	3:20
10.	"Feeling The Effects (Of Saturday Night)"	3:48
