= Marnie (dog) =

American dog

- Other names: Stinky; Greta
- Breed: Shih Tzu
- Sex: Female
- Born: October 26, 2001
- Died: March 5, 2020 (aged 18)
- Known for: Internet celebrity
- Owner: Shirley Braha
- Named after: Marnie Stern
- marniethedog.com

Marnie (26 October 2001 - 5 March 2020) was a female Shih Tzu rescue dog adopted and owned by Shirley Braha. Photos of Marnie have been popular on Instagram and Twitter. At the time of her death, Marnie's Instagram account had over 1.9 million followers and each of the photos have received hundreds of thousands of Instagram likes; in the last two months of her life, Marnie's following increased five-times over. Marnie's Twitter account has over 115 thousand followers. Braha also posted short videos of Marnie on Vine.

In August 2012 Marnie was moved to an animal shelter by animal control as an abandoned street dog living in Connecticut. Four months later, she was adopted by Braha via Petfinder. Marnie's popularity originated from her photos on Instagram, under the handle @marniethedog, which Braha has updated since 2014. Marnie was especially famous for her permanent head tilt to the left, a result of a brief case of vestibular disease.

== Life ==
Marnie was a street dog living in Connecticut. In August 2012, Marnie was moved to an animal shelter by animal control and was nicknamed Stinky due to her pungent smell from living on the street. She had health problems, such as decaying teeth, partial visual impairment in her left eye, and partial hearing impairment before Marnie's adoption. Although Marnie's decaying teeth were removed and her vision was gradually restored, her hearing impairment still remained. Marnie's head was permanently tilted to the left (a feature that she was distinctive for), possibly as a result of a brief case of vestibular disease. Her hearing impairment was also a probable effect of the disease. Marnie's tongue would commonly be lolling out of her mouth, one of her defining traits, which Braha said was simply because the dog had a very long tongue.

Four months later, Braha found Marnie via Petfinder, an adoption website. She then adopted and transferred her to New York City. Braha was told about Marnie's various health problems; Braha, in light of her health problems, did not expect Marnie to survive for more than a couple of weeks. Braha said that while transferring her by rail, she "stunk up the whole train".

After Marnie's decaying teeth were removed, her pungency was greatly reduced, and she lived far past the original few weeks suggested at the time of adoption. Braha then named her Marnie, after musician Marnie Stern.

Marnie died peacefully on March 5, 2020. Braha said that small injuries, such as an ulcer on Marnie's gums, would not heal readily due to Marnie's age. Marnie had appeared in discomfort in the days prior, and Braha made sure she was treated well before she died. Braha had also adopted a senior Pomeranian mix, Gilda, as a sister for Marnie about a month before Marnie's death.

== Internet celebrity career ==
Braha had been employed as a producer at MTV at the time she had adopted Marnie. In 2014, a few months after she had adopted Marnie, her division at MTV was closed, and she was laid off, and to pass the time, Braha decided to post photos of Marnie under the Instagram handle @marniethedog. Braha did not expect Marnie to become popular from this, as there were several other animal celebrities that Marnie would be competing with at the same time. The photos quickly became popular, gaining many Instagram likes per photo. Her account accumulated Instagram followers quickly; as a result, Marnie now has nearly two million followers on Instagram. In response to the quick popularity, Braha said: "I was just excited that anyone cared; I never imagined she would be at the level she is now". By 2015, The New Yorker named Marnie the "Most Famous American Dog on Instagram". Braha also posted photos on Twitter and short videos on Vine.

Braha routinely made appearances with celebrities, some setting up meetings with Braha to meet Marnie, including Katy Perry, Tina Fey, Selena Gomez, Betty White, Demi Lovato, Chance the Rapper and Larry King. Braha also made paid visits to events, and sells merchandise featuring Marnie. Braha was given a publishing deal by Grand Central Publishing to publish Marnie the Dog: I'm a Book, a collected work of pictures and stories about Marnie, in 2015.

== Media appearances ==
Marnie was slated to appear in a flight safety video for Delta Air Lines on the instruction of the use of seatbelts, but the Federal Aviation Administration intervened as the video did not show how dogs should properly be stowed for flights. In 2016, Avvo featured a video of Marnie in one of its television commercials and some of its online advertisements.

In 2025, Wallis Annenberg's New York Times obituary featured a 2017 photograph of the arts and wildlife philanthropist with Marnie.
