= Greg Wilson (DJ) =

English DJ

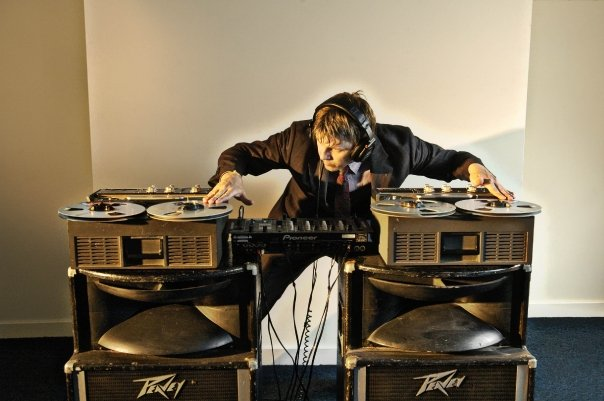
Wilson in 2005

Greg Wilson (born 22 February 1960) is an English DJ and producer, associated with both the early 1980s electro scene in Manchester and the current disco/re-edit movement. He is also a writer/commentator on dance music and popular culture.

== Career ==
=== 1975–1980 ===
Growing up in New Brighton on Merseyside, Wilson lived above his family's pub during the years 1966–1973. The premises included two function rooms where he'd witness mobile discos featuring on a weekly basis at wedding receptions and parties. His main musical influences came from the record collections of his elder brother and sister, especially the soul music labels Tamla Motown, Stax and Atlantic. Wilson began his career as a DJ in 1975 at the age of 15, having bought a mobile set-up from his schoolfriend Derek Kelsey (later known as DJ Derek Kaye). He held a residency at local nightspot The Chelsea Reach between 1975 and 1977. Further local residencies followed at The Penny Farthing (1976–1977) and The Golden Guinea (1977–1980), where he first built his reputation as a black music specialist, playing soul, funk, disco and jazz-funk.

=== 1980–1984 ===
Wilson left the Golden Guinea in 1980 and worked in Denmark and Germany (he'd previously DJ'd in Denmark and Norway for a few months in 1978) before returning to the UK to take a 4 night a week residency at Wigan Pier. In 1982, he became a full-time black music specialist, continuing Wigan Pier's Tuesday night jazz-funk session, which was voted the North's Best Club by Blues & Soul readers, with Wilson collecting the North's Best DJ award. He controversially championed early electro records at Wigan Pier and, most notably, Manchester club Legend, where he took over their Wednesday jazz-funk night in 1981. As with Wigan Pier, people travelled to his nights at Legend from places including Birmingham, Huddersfield, Sheffield, Leeds, Bradford, Nottingham, Liverpool and London. Legend attracted a predominantly black crowd to listen to the new electro-funk records, which were mainly coming out of New York City. Wilson also began to take a serious approach to mixing around this point, and is regarded as one of the UK pioneers. In 1982, he began to present regular mixes of the music he was playing in the clubs on Manchester's Piccadilly Radio, and these featured on Mike Shaft's specialist black music show T.C.O.B (Taking Care of Business). These radio mixes are still talked about as being influential to this day, with the end of year Best of 82 and Best of 83 mixes regarded as classics.

In February 1983, Wilson was invited to demonstrate live mixing on the Channel 4 TV show The Tube. Interviewed by presenter, Jools Holland, with Mike Shaft commentating, Wilson mixed between 2 copies of David Joseph's "You Can't Hide (Your Love from Me)", then a new release, but subsequently a UK top 20 hit. This was the first time a British DJ had mixed live on TV.

Wilson was a fixture on the All-Dayer circuit in the North and Midlands during this period, regularly appearing alongside other black music specialists including Colin Curtis, Mike Shaft, John Grant, Hewan Clarke, Richard Searling, Kev Edwards, Pete Haigh, Jonathan, Trevor M and Cleveland Anderson. In 1983, Wilson began a Friday night residency at The Haçienda club in Manchester, which had opened the previous year. This was the club's first weekly dance music night and would lay the groundwork for its influential Nude night, also held every Friday, which came to prominence in the mid-'80s with DJs Mike Pickering and Martin Prendergast.

Wilson also put together the first UK 're-edit', Paul Haig's "Heaven Sent", in 1983, and taught Norman Cook (a.k.a. Fatboy Slim), then a young aspiring DJ called Quentin, how to cut and scratch in December 1983 during a short Haçienda tour of the South.

=== 1984–1987 ===
At the end of 1983, aged 23, Wilson retired from DJing to focus on record production, as well as managing Manchester breakdance crew Broken Glass. They gained national exposure via TV appearances including a famous edition of The Tube, filmed at The Haçienda in January 1984, on which Madonna made her UK live TV debut. Later in 1984, along with musicians Martin Jackson and Andy Connell, he co-wrote and produced all but one of the tracks on the Street Sounds UK Electro album, now seen as a seminal British dance album, the first to feature sampling. One of the tracks, "Style of the Street", a recording by Broken Glass, was sampled by The Prodigy on their 2004 hit "Girls". However, the project was short-lived, Jackson and Connell going on to form the band Swing Out Sister, while Wilson, struggling for opportunities, would eventually re-locate to London in 1987.

=== 1987–1993 ===
In 1987, Wilson began to manage and produce Manchester's Ruthless Rap Assassins and sister band Kiss AMC. The Rap Assassins released two critically acclaimed albums via EMI, Killer Album (1990) and Th!nk (It Ain't Illegal Yet) (1991). Their best known recording, "And It Wasn't a Dream", a minor chart hit in 1990, focused on the plight of West Indian immigrants coming to the UK in the 1950s and 1960s, and was named amongst Mojo's "50 Greatest British Tracks Ever" in 2006. In 2011, urban artist Roots Manuva would hail their music as "the roots of grime". Moving back to the North, Wilson would make further records between 1990 and 1993 with Mind Body & Soul (MBS), Sensuround, Mana Loa, The 25th Of May and Intastella.

=== 1993–2003 ===
The following decade was something of a wilderness period for Wilson, but in 1994 he revisited his electro-funk past, compiling the Classic Electro Mastercuts album. This would generate a small number of DJ bookings, his first in 10 years, in promotion of the album, and in 1996, he was part of a collective of DJs and musicians who promoted a series of nights called The Monastery in Birkenhead, Liverpool and London. A mix, The Monastic Mix, was the last he ever put together on reel-to-reel.

=== 2003–present ===
==== DJ comeback ====
Alerted by the lack of documentation of the specialist black music scene he'd experienced, Wilson announced the website electrofunkroots.co.uk in 2003. The site focuses on the early '80s era, what led up to it and what came out of it. Offers of DJ bookings followed and in December 2003 Wilson made his DJ comeback at a Music Is Better in Manchester club The Attic. This was the launchpad that re-ignited Wilson's DJ career 20 years on from his retirement. As his popularity increased, he appeared throughout the UK, Europe and the world, gaining newfound followers from a younger generation of clubbers.

In 2005, his re-edits compilation Credit to the Edit, released on the Tirk Recordings label, was the catalyst for his international success, helping to establish him, once again, as a scene leader.

Apart from working as a DJ, producer and remixer, Wilson has written on various aspects of dance / black culture with articles published in magazines / webzines including Wax Poetics, Disco Pogo, Clash, Grand Slam, Strobelight Honey and Discopia. His Discotheque Archives series for DJ Magazine ran for 25 editions between 2016 and 2018, and was published as a limited edition paperback in 2022, with an extended hardback following in 2022. He wrote the liner notes for the 2024 Blu-ray release of the documentary film, ‘Getting It Back – The Story Of Cymande’.

Wilson's blog, Being a DJ, ran from 2010 to 2020, his observations on various aspects of club culture becoming an online touchstone for dance music enthusiasts. Wilson has also been interviewed for a number of books, TV and film projects focusing on the history of club culture.

==== Musical output ====
Credit to the Edit Volume 2 in 2009 was accompanied by tour dates in the UK, Europe, Japan, Australia and the US, the series returning with Vol 3 in 2018. Wilson was also active with various remix and re-edit releases, both on his own and in collaboration with Derek Kaye, Peza, Henry Greenwood and Ché Wilson. His remix credits including Roxy Music, Groove Armada, Grace Jones, Gilberto Gil, The XX, Confidence Man, Gabriels, Happy Mondays, Sugarhill Gang and Grandmaster Flash & The Furious Five.

Wilson has produced a series of documentative podcasts, Time Capsule, Random Influences and Early 80s Floorfillers, as well as the long-running blog series, Living to Music, where people were encouraged to listen to a monthly album selection in their home environment. This served to influence other related listening events, including Colleen Murphy's Classic Album Sundays audiophile sessions. In 2022 he launched his Early-'80s Mixtape series on Worldwide FM.

Commencing in 2009, Wilson has built a considerable following on SoundCloud with regular uploads of DJ mixes, mainly live recordings, with further uploads to Mixcloud.

==== Festivals ====
In August 2010, he co-curated, with Jack Hemingway, the Warehouse and Roller Disco areas at the inaugural Vintage Festival at Goodwood. It was named 'Best New Festival' at the UK Festival Awards, whilst Wilson, in his role of DJ, was nominated in the 'Best Feel Good Act of the Summer' category. He has appeared at festivals throughout the UK and Europe as well as in the US, Canada, Australia, Japan, Brazil and Mexico.

In addition to his DJ work, Wilson has given talks on music and dance culture at numerous events including Afro Modern at Tate Liverpool, Vintage at London Southbank, Salon at Standon Calling and Festival N°6 and alongside legendary figures Nile Rodgers and Giorgio Moroder at ADE in Amsterdam.

==== Super Weird Substance ====
10 years on from his DJ return, in 2014 he unveiled his new multi-media label Super Weird Substance, releasing the "Blind Arcade Meets Super Weird Substance in the Morphogenetic Field" mixtape before following it up with a series of 5 Super Weird Happenings in different locations across the UK.

In 2015, the label released 8 vinyl singles, brought together on a 2 CD compilation, "Greg Wilson Presents Super Weird Substance", including Wilson's own "Summer Came My Way", featuring The Reynolds. A sixth Happening followed at Festival No. 6 in Portmeirion.

Collaborating with celebrated comic book writer Alan Moore, plus label artists, ex-Rap Assassin Kermit Leveridge and vocalists The Reynolds, a second mixtape, "Alan Moore's Mandrill Meets Super Weird Substance at the Arts Lab Apocalypse" appeared in 2017, followed by the 14 Hour Super Weird Happening at The Florrie in Liverpool, with Moore making a rare appearance.

After a handful of further releases, the label was put into hibernation with the onset of covid. Diversifying, the book, 'Greg Wilson's Discotheque Archives' was issued during 2020 lockdown as a limited run paperback, with an extended hardback edition following in 2023.

SWS Books has subsequently published 'James Hamilton's Disco Pages 1975-1982' in 2024, edited by Mike Atkinson and with introductions from Norman Cook and Wilson, with a companion volume, ‘James Hamilton’s Dance Pages 1983-1989’ following in 2025. He also launched the podcast series, ‘Record Mirror Disco Charts’ with Mike Atkinson.

== Awards and recognition ==
- 1983: Voted 'North's Top DJ' by readers of Blues & Soul magazine.
- 1983: The first British DJ to mix live on TV.
- 2008: Nominated by DJ Magazine for outstanding contribution, and also named amongst their top twenty remixers of all time.
- 2010: As part of their Essential Mix 500 special, Radio 1 selected Wilson's Essential Mix as one of 10 classics that spanned the show's near 17-year history.
- 2015: Wilson's Essential Mix was selected as one of Rolling Stone magazine's 25 greatest internet DJ mixes of all time.
- 2015: Awarded DJ Magazine's Industry Icon Award at The Best of British Awards.
- 2025: Wilson celebrated the 50th anniversary of when he started out as a DJ.
