= Ventriloquizzing =

Studio album by Fujiya & Miyagi
- Released: 17 January 2011
- Genre: Pop/Rock
- Label: Full Time Hobby
- Producer: Fujiya & Miyagi, Thom Monahan

Fujiya & Miyagi chronology
Lightbulbs (2008)	Ventriloquizzing (2011)	Artificial Sweeteners (2014)

Professional ratings
Review scores
Source	Rating
Entertainment.ie	2/5 stars
Spin	5/10 stars
Pitchfork Media	6.3/10

Ventriloquizzing is the fourth album by Fujiya & Miyagi released in 2011. It is the first album on which the band chose to share producer credits, bringing in Thom Monahan to assist on the project.

== Track listing ==
1. "Ventriloquizzing"
2. "Sixteen Shades of Black & Blue"
3. "Cat Got Your Tongue"
4. "Taiwanese Boots"
5. "Yoyo"
6. "Pills"
7. "OK"
8. "Minestrone"
9. "Spilt Milk"
10. "Tinsel & Glitter"
11. "Universe"
12. "Obstacles" (iTunes Bonus Track)

== Release history ==
Country	Date	Label	Format	Catalog
United Kingdom	17 January 2011	Full Time Hobby	Compact Disc	FTH096CD
United States	25 January 2011	Yep Roc	Compact Disc	
