= Big Mother Gig =

American indie rock band

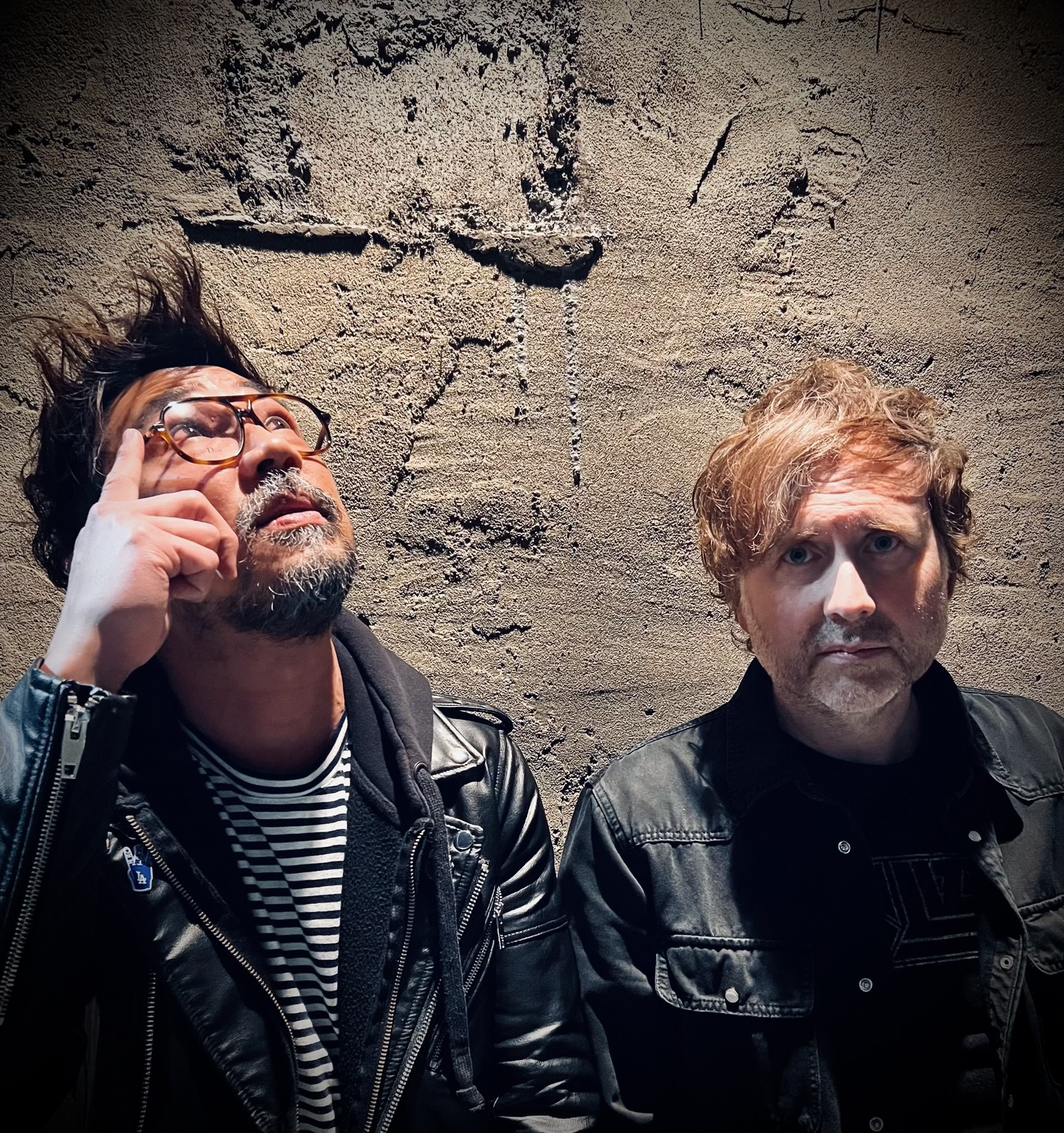

Background information
- Origin: Milwaukee, U.S.
- Genres: Alternative rock, indie rock
- Years active: 1992–1996, 2016–2023
- Labels: Fraga Sweet Sweet
- Past members: Richard Jankovich; Albert Kurniawan; Michael Datz; Micah Lopez; Riz Rashid; Jason Borkowicz; Matt Deede; Brady Roehl; Joe Neumann; Brian Rutkowski; Charles Watson; Rob Due
- Website: bigmothergig.com

Big Mother Gig was an indie rock band originally founded in Milwaukee, Wisconsin and later based in Los Angeles, CA, by Richard Jankovich.

While attending Marquette University in Milwaukee in the 1990s, Richard Jankovich formed Big Mother Gig with Rob Due, Jason Borkowicz and Charles Watson. In 1993, they released "My Social Commentary." In 1994, Riz Rashid replaced Due and in 1995, Brady Roehl and Matt Deede replaced Borkowicz and Watson respectively. In 1996, Big Mother Gig released "Smiling Politely" and broke up when Jankovich moved to New York City.

In 2016, Big Mother Gig announced a new EP as well as a reunion show in Milwaukee. Almost Primed, their first new music in over 20 years, was released in March 2017. The band, then based in Los Angeles was fleshed out with Jankovich, Mike Datz (guitar), Micah Lopez (bass) and Albert Kurniawan (drums).

On October 12, 2018, they released "No More Questions" which collected tracks from the EP, the singles they had released throughout 2018 and brand new songs including "Low Payout" featuring Dicky Barrett (The Mighty Mighty Bosstones) and "Our Cover's Blown" featuring Britta Phillips (Luna) and co-written with author Rick Moody. The album was praised by Alternative Press, Paste, Under The Radar, New Noise, Impose, AllThingsGo, Substream, and more. "(Let's Make) Compelling Content" was Song Of The Day on NPR/The Current and appeared twice on the Submodern Radio Chart. The music video for "Obliterate" stars Michael Ornstein from Sons Of Anarchy. Big Mother Gig supported the album with tour dates around the Midwest and California with Luna, Soccer Mommy, Gin Blossoms, Peelander-Z and more.

In February 2021, Big Mother Gig announced their new LP Gusto on Stereogum and released the first single, "The Underdog" featuring Leah Wellbaum of Slothrust. Second single, "The Doctor Will See You Now" was released on March 17. Gusto was released on April 30, 2021 to positive reviews by Stereogum, NPR, American Songwriter, BrooklynVegan and more. In the Fall of 2021, the band supported the album with a 3 week US tour opening for Black Joe Lewis & the Honeybears. Shortly before the tour, Big Mother Gig announced some line-up changes: Mike Datz and Micah Lopez had left the band and Big Mother Gig would continue as the duo of Richard Jankovich and Albert Kurniawan.

In January 2023, "The Underdog" was featured in episode 511 of The Rookie on ABC. They toured in March 2023 with Emily Wolfe.

In November, 2024, the band announced that Big Mother Gig is no more and that the remaining members are continuing on under the name Long A.

== Discography ==
- 1993: My Social Commentary (LP)
- 1996: Smiling Politely (LP)
- 2016: Quintessentially Average: 92-96 (LP)
- 2017: Almost Primed (EP)
- 2018: No More Questions (LP)
- 2021: Gusto (LP)
