= Electro Karaoke in the Negative Style =

Studio album by Fujiya and Miyagi
- Released: 2002
- Genre: IDM
- Label: Massive Advance

Fujiya and Miyagi chronology
Electro Karaoke in the Negative Style (2002)	Transparent Things (2006)

Electro Karaoke in the Negative Style is the debut album by Fujiya & Miyagi released in 2002.

== Track listing ==
1. "New Accounts Analysts"
2. "Rot"
3. "King Holer"
4. "Simeone Slides"
5. "Skinny Punk"
6. "Tarr's White Collar"
7. "Skeleton Phone Cover"
8. "Uptight"
9. "Diagrams"
10. "Shake"
11. "Electro Karaoke"
12. "Lolalucamilla"
