= Lightbulbs (album) =

Studio album by Fujiya & Miyagi
- Released: 9 September 2008
- Genre: Indie rock
- Length: 41:41
- Label: Full Time Hobby
- Producer: Fujiya & Miyagi

Fujiya & Miyagi chronology
Transparent Things (2006)	Lightbulbs (2008)	Ventriloquizzing (2011)

Professional ratings
Review scores
Source	Rating
World of Music	4/5 stars

Lightbulbs is the third album by Fujiya & Miyagi, released in 2008. The song "Uh" was featured in TV series Breaking Bad and Misfits. "Sore Thumb" was featured in NBA 2K10.

== Track listing ==
1. "Knickerbocker"
2. "Uh"
3. "Pickpocket"
4. "Goosebumps"
5. "Rook to Queen's Pawn Six"
6. "Sore Thumb"
7. "Dishwasher"
8. "Pterodactyls"
9. "Pussyfooting"
10. "Lightbulbs"
11. "Hundreds & Thousands"
12. "Je Ne Comprends Pas" (Special Edition Bonus Track)
13. "One Trick Pony" (Special Edition Bonus Track)
