= Tirk Recordings =

British record label

Tirk Recordings is a UK record label created by Sav Remzi. It has signed a broad range of sounds from the Kraut Rock of Fujiya & Miyagi, to the disco re-edits from Greg Wilson, the "SoCal" sounds of Daniel Judd (aka "Sorcerer") and the New York 'Disco bump' of Drrtyhaze. Signings include solo works from the Chaz Jankel (Ian Dury's Blockheads) and producer Martin Rushent; also house music acts like Syclops (from producer Maurice Fulton) and Tom Findlay's (Groove Armada) Sugardaddy.

In 2007 a merger with recently formed independent Music Rights Collective provided Tirk with an infrastructure to sign new acts, produce, and market its music.

== Artists ==
- Chaz Jankel
- Fujiya & Miyagi
- Greg Wilson
- Louie Austen
- Martin Rushent
- Pocket
- Sugardaddy
