= The Oranges Band =

American indie rock band

- Origin: Baltimore, Maryland, United States
- Genres: Indie rock
- Years active: 2000–present
- Labels: Morphius Records; Lookout! Records
- Members: Roman Kuebler; Dave Voyles; Patrick Martin
- Past members: Daniel Black Tim Johnston; Faye Malarkey; Virat Shukla; Greg McKenna; Art Lavis; Michael Boarman; Lauren Madow; Matt Dickinson Doug Gillard
- Website: Official website

The Oranges Band is an American indie rock band from Baltimore, Maryland signed with Green Day's original label, Lookout! Records. Fronted by ex-Spoon bassist Roman Kuebler, The Oranges' first record, The Five Dollars EP, was released on Baltimore-based label Morphius Records. Subsequent touring and critical praise earned the band a deal with Lookout, culminating in the release of an EP, album, and several videos, leading up to the release of their album, The World & Everything in It. In 2004, Morphius released a retrospective compiling the band's earlier work, including The Five Dollars EP, the now out-of-print 900 Miles of Fucking Hell EP, as well as various unreleased tracks entitled Two Thousands. In 2008, with a new lineup that included Pat Martin on bass and guest guitarist Doug Gillard, the band released their third full-length album, The Oranges Band are Invisible.

== Discography ==
- $5 EP (2000)
- Nine Hundred Miles of Fucking Hell (2001)
- On TV (2002)
- All Around (2003)
- Two Thousands (2004)
- The World & Everything in It (2005)
- The Oranges Band Are Invisible (2008)
