= Michael Leviton =

American singer-songwriter

- Origin: San Fernando Valley, California
- Genres: Rock, Pop, Folk, Surf
- Occupation(s): Singer-songwriter, musician
- Instrument: baritone ukulele
- Years active: 2006–present
- Labels: Smith Street, Ace Fu

Michael Leviton is a singer-songwriter, ukulele player, and author from Brooklyn, New York. His album, "My Favorite Place to Drown" was released on Smith Street and Ace Fu Records in 2006. He toured with They Might Be Giants in 2006, and is closely involved with other underground New York musicians, frequently performing throughout the area. In February 2007, Leviton began offering ukulele lessons.

In 2021 Abrams Books published his memoir, "To Be Honest". It tells of growing up with parents whose enthusiasm for “just being honest” bordered on extreme, and the impact that approach had on the rest of his life.

== External links and references ==
- Article in "Paste"
- Article in "Time Out New York"
- Official Website
- Myspace page
- Michael Leviton entry in The Indie Music Database
- The Tell – Storytelling/music event and podcast
