= Slothrust =

American alternate rock band

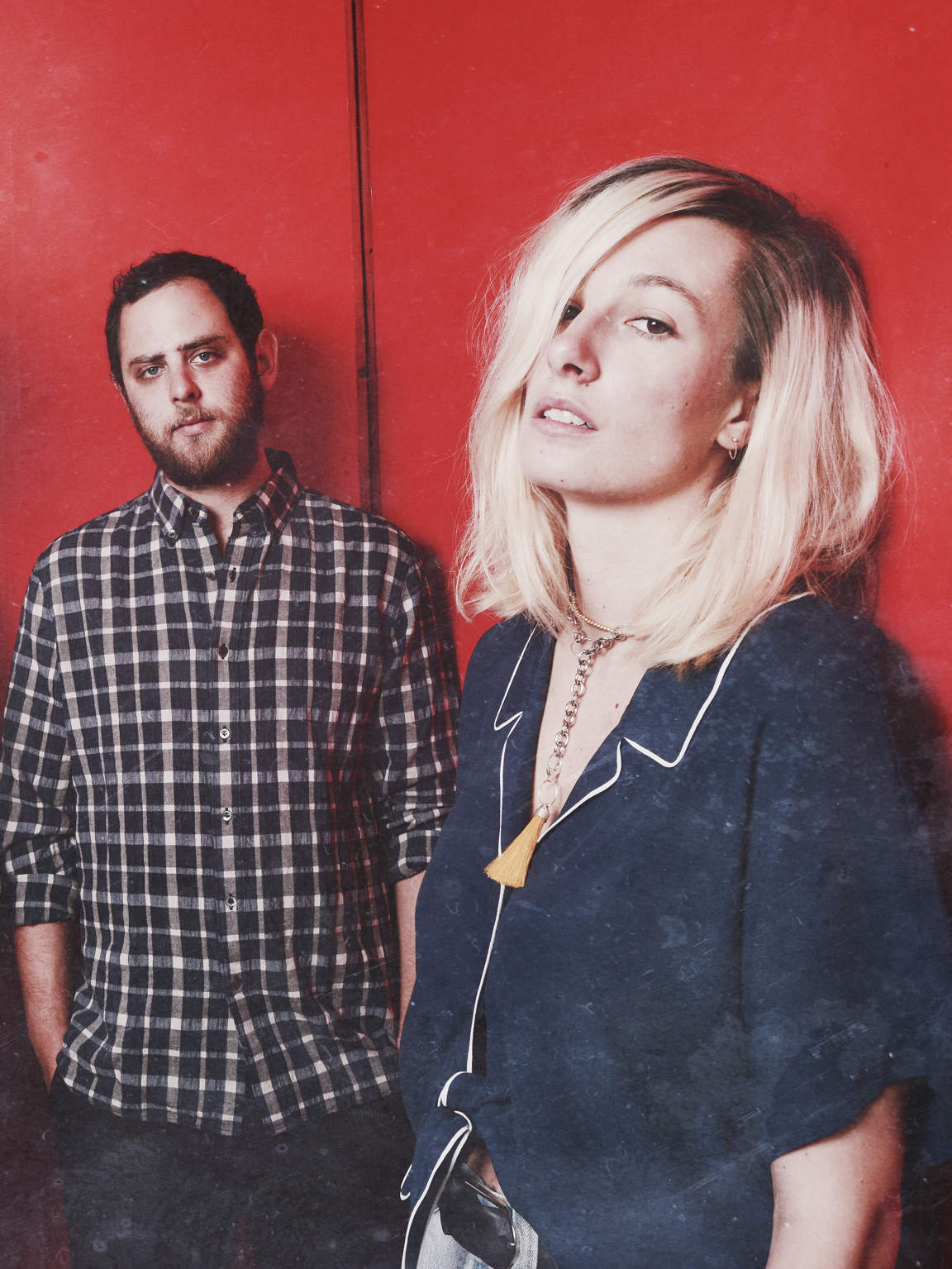
- Gorin and Wellbaum in 2017

Background information
- Origin: Boston, Massachusetts, U.S.
- Genres: Alternative rock; garage rock; grunge
- Years active: 2010–present
- Labels: Ba Da Bing; Burger; Dangerbird
- Members: Leah Wellbaum; Will Gorin
- Past members: Kyle Bann
- Website: slothrust.com

Slothrust (pronounced "sloth-rust"', IPA: [ˈslɔθ.ɹʌst]) is an American alternative rock band from Boston, Massachusetts, formed in 2010.

== Background ==
Slothrust consists of Leah Wellbaum (vocals, guitar) and Will Gorin (drums). Wellbaum and Gorin first began collaborating as students at Sarah Lawrence College. After performing in various school groups, the two joined to create music with a "heavier" sound.

The name Slothrust came together as a combination of Wellbaum's former project "Slothbox" and "rust" to signify time passing.

=== 2012–2013: Feels Your Pain ===
The band released their debut album Feels Your Pain, featuring their lead single "7:30 AM". The track was later featured as the opening theme song for FX's television series You're the Worst.

In November, Slothrust collaborated with Wreckroom Records to record a cover of the Turtles' "Happy Together".

=== 2014–2015: Of Course You Do ===
On February 18, 2014, Slothrust released their second album Of Course You Do through Ba Da Bing.

=== 2016–2017: Everyone Else ===
On July 7, 2016, it was announced that Slothrust were signing to Dangerbird Records.

The band premiered several tracks that lead to the release of their third full-length album, Everyone Else. The first single, "Horseshoe Crab", premiered via Noisey on August 10, 2016, was explained as "a dark narrative about love, loss, growing up, depression, and existential anxiety". Slothrust later shared "Like a Child Hiding Behind Your Tombstone", and "Horseshoe Crab".

Everyone Else debuted on October 28, 2016. The record was described as less angry and closely relating to dreams and the water, "Of Course You Do, as well as the one before that, Feels Your Pain, are a bit angrier. When you write songs earlier in your life—depending on where you’re at—the likelihood of them being angsty is higher," Wellbaum explained to Out Magazine, "This record I don’t think is angry in the same way. It asks more questions...[Everyone Else] has space for interpretation and for questions. And the new record deals very specifically with water and dreams in a way that the first two did not."

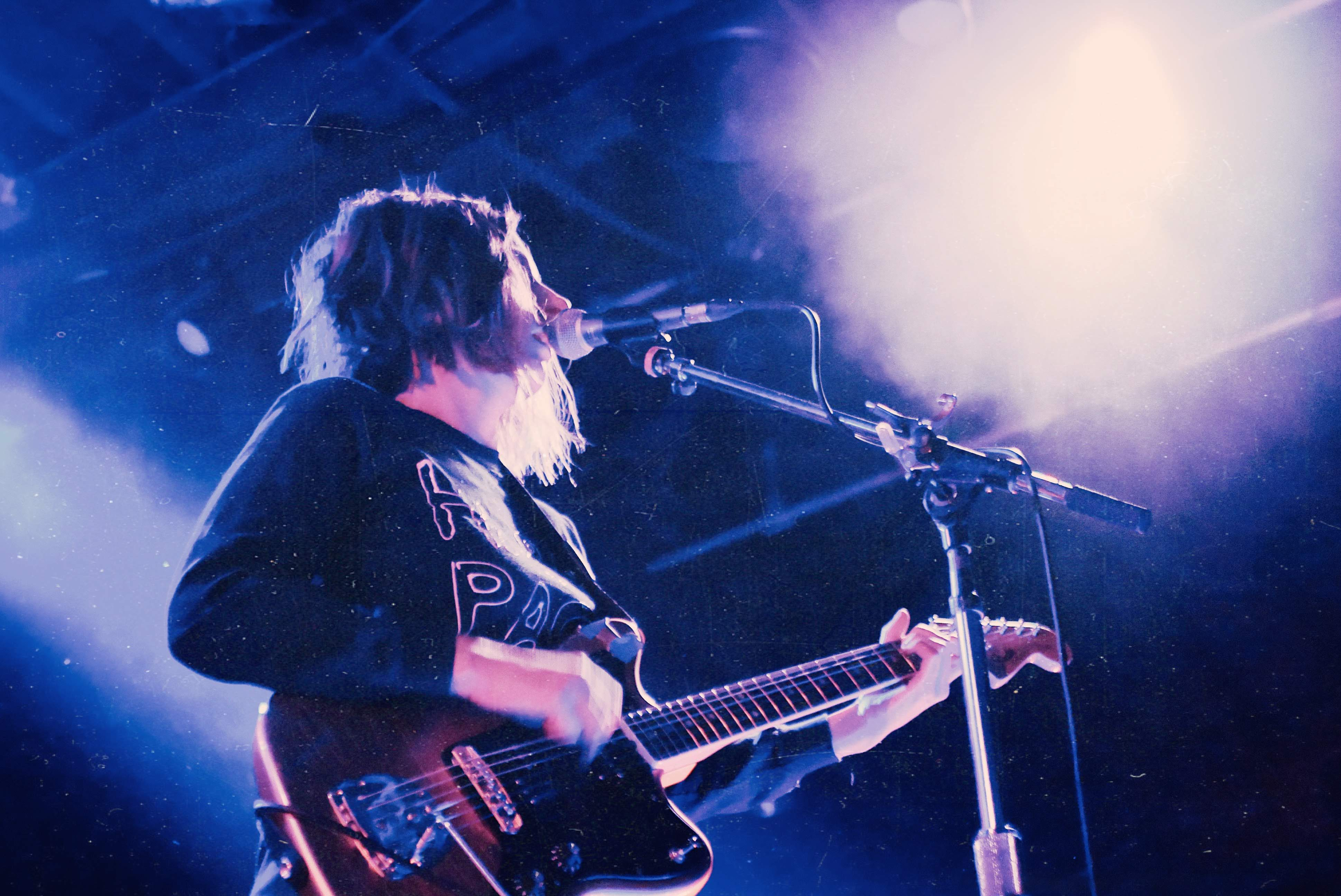
Slothrust performing live at Slim's, San Francisco, 2019

Kicking off the release of Everyone Else, the band announced a tour with rock band Highly Suspect in the fall of 2016. Additionally, the band celebrated the new album with a sold-out headline show at Brooklyn's Rough Trade music store/venue on November 1. The band performed Everyone Else in its entirety, in addition to various fan favorites such as "7:30 AM", "Crockpot" and "Homewreck Wifey".

The band spent the majority of 2017 touring, including US headline tours in March, July and August. The band also performed at Chicago's Lollapalooza. On August 3, 2017, it was announced that Slothrust would be touring the UK in the fall with the band Manchester Orchestra.

On August 8, 2017, Slothrust premiered a B-side track titled "Milking the Snake", via DIY.

=== 2018–present: The Pact ===
After months of recording early in the year, The Pact was released on September 14, 2018. On release day, the band kicked off a two-month long tour to promote the album. Videos were released for the tracks '"Peach" and "Double Down". In February 2021 Big Mother Gig released "The Underdog", a song featuring vocals from Leah Wellbaum.

April 2021 the band released fifth studio album, Parallel Timeline, by Dangerbird Records on September 10, 2021. The songs "Cranium", "Strange Astrology", and "The Next Curse" were released ahead of the album.

On August 7, 2021, two screen captures of a police report from the Columbus Division of Police were posted on image hosting site Imgur which detail a rape allegation against Kyle Bann. On August 13, the band announced that they were aware of "the current allegation against our previous bassist Kyle," and that he is no longer a part of Slothrust. On September 1, they announced that they would be touring with bassist Brooks Allison.

On October 20, 2023, Slothrust released the EP I Promise, in conjunction with announcing a tour promoting the upcoming ten-year anniversary of their 2014 album Of Course You Do.

For Slothrust's tour in support of their sixth album What They Grow in the Garden (2026), the band expanded into a four-piece with James Downes on bass, joined by Lilah Larson, who also tours with Bambara.

== Band members ==
Current

- Leah Wellbaum – lead vocals; guitar (2010–present)
- Will Gorin – drums, percussion (2010–present)
- James Downes – bass (touring 2026–present)
- Lilah Larson – guitar (touring 2026–present)

Former

- Kyle Bann - bass (2010–2021)
- Brooks Allison – bass (touring 2021–2022)
- Annie Hoffman – bass (touring 2022–2026)

== Discography ==
=== Studio albums ===
Title	Album details	Peak chart positions	
Title	Album details	US Heat	US Indie
Feels Your Pain	Released: May 24, 2012; Label: Ba Da Bing Records; Formats: CD, Digital Download	—	—
Of Course You Do	Released: February 18, 2014; Labels: Ba Da Bing Records, Burger Records; Formats: CD, Digital Download	—	—
Everyone Else	Released: October 28, 2016; Label: Dangerbird Records; Formats: CD, Digital Download, Vinyl	—	—
The Pact	Released: September 14, 2018; Label: Dangerbird Records; Formats: CD, Digital Download, Vinyl	11	38
Parallel Timeline	Released: September 10, 2021; Label: Dangerbird Records; Formats: CD, Digital Download, Vinyl	—	—
What They Grow in the Garden	Released: September 18, 2026; Label: Equal Vision Records; Formats: CD, Digital Download, Vinyl	—	—
"—" denotes album that did not chart or was not released

=== EPs ===
Title	Album details
The Demo(n)s	Released: June 1, 2010; Label: Self-released
Show Me How You Want It to Be	Released: November 10, 2017; Label: Dangerbird Records
Peach	Released: October 25, 2019; Label: Dangerbird Records
I Promise	Released: October 20, 2023; Label: Dangerbird Records

=== Singles ===
Title	Peak Chart Positions	Album Details
Title	US Main. Rock	Album Details
"In a Sexual Way"	—	Released: May 29, 2012; Label: Wreckroom
"Happy Together"	—	Released: November 20, 2012; Label: Wreckroom
"7:30 AM"	—	Released: April 28, 2013; Label: Ba Da Bing Records / Wreckroom
"No Eye Candy"	—	Released: April 8, 2014; Label: Ba Da Bing Records
"Electric Funeral"	—	Released: April 22, 2014; Label: Wreckroom
"Horseshoe Crab"	—	Released: August 10, 2016; Label: Dangerbird Records
"Milking the Snake"	—	Released: August 8, 2017; Label: Dangerbird Records
"Planetarium"	—	Released: August 31, 2018; Label: Dangerbird Records
"Double Down"	—	Released: January 9, 2019; Label: Dangerbird Records
"Cranium"	—	Released: February 24, 2021; Label: Dangerbird Records
"Strange Astrology"	—	Released: April 16, 2021; Label: Dangerbird Records
"Waiting"	—	Released: September 10, 2021; Label: Dangerbird Records
"Pony"	37	Released: September 13, 2023; Label: Dangerbird Records
"Wildcard"	—	Released: August 8, 2025; Label: Self-Released
