= Burnside Project =

- Origin: New York City, United States
- Genres: Electropop, indie rock, synth-pop
- Years active: 1999–2024
- Labels: Bar/None, Sony Music, Fraga Music, KID Recordings
- Past members: Richard Jankovich; Gerald Hammill; Paul Searing; Anna Bohichik; Michael Lerner
- Website: Official website

Burnside Project was a New York–based electropop band featuring Richard Jankovich, Gerald Hammill and Paul Searing.

In 2000, Jankovich released the self-titled Burnside Project CD independently which led to interest from record labels including Bar/None, whom Jankovich signed with in 2002. The album has been described as "some sort of bizarre pairing of DJ Spooky and Paul Westerberg." This album was subsequently re-mastered and re-packaged for wide release in 2007 on Fraga Records.

Burnside Project's Bar/None debut, The Networks, the Circuits, the Streams, the Harmonies was released in 2003. The album began charting on college radio stations across the country (including heavy rotation on Seattle’s KEXP), and received high praise in mainstream publications, earning an A− in SPIN and placement on Rolling Stone’s “Hot List.” It was also nominated for the Shortlist Music Prize that year by writer and director Cameron Crowe.

The single "Cue the Pulse to Begin", from The Networks, the Circuits, the Streams, the Harmonies, was used as the theme song to seasons 4 and 5 of the US TV series Queer as Folk and won a 2005 BMI Cable Award. "Cue The Pulse To Begin" also became a top 10 radio hit in Japan when "Networks" was released on Sony/DefSTAR in 2004. The band toured the country in support of the release in Summer of 2004.

The follow-up album in 2005, The Finest Example is You, featured the singles "And So It Goes" and "One to One." Entertainment Weekly proclaimed The Finest Example is You “an apt title, since their songs are great examples of where indie rock should be headed." Burnside Project hasn't performed live since April 2006.

On September 9, 2016, the band released Syntax and Semantics, their fourth album on Bar/None Records.

In late 2022, the band began releasing previously unavailable remixes on digital audio services.

In 2023, KID Recordings released the 20th anniversary reissue of The Networks, the Circuits, the Streams, the Harmonies. The reissue featured 9 previously unreleased songs and remixes including a cover of Electronic's 1990 hit "Getting Away With It" and "He Never Knew The Benefits Of Caffeine (Sack International Remix)” which was reimagined by Grammy-winning producer Peter Wade Keusch (MNDR), WFMU DJ Duane Harriott and music supervisor Alec Deruggerio.

In December 2023, Paul Searing died unexpectedly.

== Discography ==
Studio albums

- The Networks, the Circuits, the Streams, the Harmonies (2003)
- The Finest Example Is You (2005)
- Syntax and Semantics (2016)

Independent albums

- Burnside Project (2000 / Remastered 2007)

Reissue albums

- The Networks, the Circuits, the Streams, the Harmonies - 20th Anniversary Reissue (2023)
