= Dirty on Purpose =

- Origin: Brooklyn, New York
- Genres: indie pop, shoegaze, noise rock, indie rock
- Years active: 2002–2008
- Label: North Street Records
- Past members: Doug Marvin; Joseph Jurewicz; George Wilson; DJ Boudreau; Erika Forster
- Website: Official website

Dirty on Purpose were an American band from Brooklyn, New York, whose music was often described as indie pop or shoegaze.

== History ==
Formed in 2002, they were originally composed of Doug Marvin (drums, vocals), Joseph Jurewicz (guitar, vocals), George Wilson (guitar, vocals), DJ Boudreau (bass) and Erika Forster (keyboards, vocals). Performing regularly in New York, the band initially garnered attention for their sound, which featured alternating male and female vocals and layered, distorted guitar work reminiscent of My Bloody Valentine and the Jesus and Mary Chain.

The band self-released their eponymous four-song debut EP in 2003, followed by a second EP, Sleep Late for a Better Tomorrow, in 2004. The latter was re-released on North Street Records in 2005. Forster left to concentrate on her other project, all-female indie pop trio Au Revoir Simone.

On June 29, 2006, Dirty on Purpose released their full-length debut album, Hallelujah Sirens, on North Street Records. After critical praise from publications like Pichfork, Entertainment Weekly, NPR, Allmusic, Filter, Spin, Alternative Press, Hallelujah Sirens was nominated for Best Indie Rock Album at the 2007 PLUG Independent Music Awards. The band also co-hosted an episode of MTV2's alternative music show, Subterranean, with host Jim Shearer, which premiered the band's music videos for "Light Pollution," "No Radio" and "Mind Blindness".

In 2008, Dirty on Purpose released their third EP, Like Bees, featuring guest female vocals from Jaymay and Holly Miranda. A final digital-only EP called Dead Volcanoes was issued via RCRD LBL later in 2008.

During their career, Dirty on Purpose performed at various music festivals including SXSW, CMJ Music Marathon, Siren Music Festival, Pop Montreal, Seaport Music Festival, Street Scene San Diego and North East Sticks Together. The band also performed live on radio stations KEXP, WOXY and Indie 103.1, and as the opening act for bands including Arcade Fire, the Decemberists, the Besnard Lakes, Band of Horses, Clap Your Hands Say Yeah, the Album Leaf, the Thermals, Earlimart, Say Hi to Your Mom and Fujiya & Miyagi.

Dirty on Purpose broke up in 2008. On December 5, 2008, the band posted a blog entry on their MySpace page, stating "...we're going our separate ways", adding that they weren't interested in recording another album, but are still making music. The band went on to say that their tour with A Place To Bury Strangers would be their last, declaring, "...we thought it was an appropriate way to wind things down and say goodbye to our friends and fans". The band's final show, including a special appearance by Forster, took place on December 31, 2008 at New York's Mercury Lounge.

== In popular culture ==
- "Girls and Sunshine", "Spider Eyes" and "All New Friends" were featured on MTV's Laguna Beach: The Real Orange County (2005).
- "No Radio" was featured on MTV's Human Giant (2007).
- "Audience in the Room" was featured in a Virgin Mobile TV commercial (2008).

== Former members ==
- Doug Marvin – drums, vocals (2002-2008)
- Joseph Jurewicz – guitar, vocals (2002-2008)
- George Wilson – guitar, vocals (2002-2008)
- DJ Boudreau – bass (2002-2008)
- Erika Forster – keyboards, vocals (2002-2004)

== Discography ==
=== Studio albums ===
- Hallelujah Sirens (2006, North Street Records)

=== EPs ===
- Dirty on Purpose (2003, self-released)
- Sleep Late for a Better Tomorrow (2005, North Street Records)
- Like Bees (2008, North Street Records)
- Dead Volcanoes (2008, RCRD LBL)
