= The Cloud Room =

American rock band

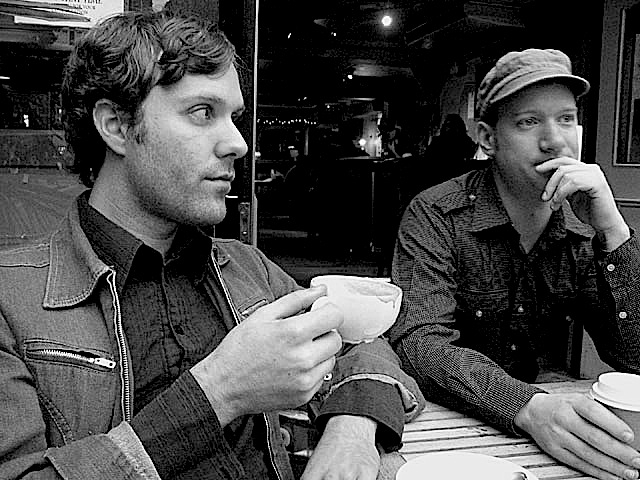
- The Cloud Room (left to right): J Stuart, Jon Petrow (Jason Pharr not pictured)

Background information
- Origin: Brooklyn, New York
- Genres: Indie rock, indie pop, soft rock
- Years active: 2004–present
- Label: unsigned
- Members: J Stuart (vocals/guitar); Jason Pharr (drums); Jon Petrow (bass); Chris Shade (keyboards); Devon C Johnson (guitar)
- Past members: Steve Milton (keyboards/vocals); Dave Horowitz (guitar)
- Website: Official website

The Cloud Room is an American band based in Brooklyn, New York, named after the Prohibition-era speakeasy at the top of the Chrysler Building. Their self-titled album was released in 2005 and contains the hit "Hey Now Now", a song that garnered the band rapid popularity on MP3 blogs but, being an indie release, had difficulty getting airplay on Commercial American radio.

== History ==
J Stuart, relative of American Minimalist Composer Philip Glass, founded The Cloud Room after moving from California to New York to work with filmmaker Hal Hartley. In 2004, Stuart suffered a health crisis, leading to a false positive HIV test result, an event that was later revealed in a week-long feature on the band by Pitchfork Media. It was during this time that he began writing songs, one of which would become "Hey Now Now". When the test was later proven false, Stuart decided to focus his life on his first love, music.

In 2006, "Hey Now Now" was named by Rolling Stone as a top ten single of the year. Later that year, as the band was recording their second album in Stuart's apartment, a fire broke out and destroyed their equipment. However, the new recordings survived. In 2007, The Cloud Room became the first unsigned band to be used in an international ad campaign when Pepsi used "Hey Now Now" in a Frédéric Planchon-directed spot titled "Destinies" and featuring Ronaldinho. In September 2007, The Cloud Room played the Sopot Festival in Poland, representing the U.S. along with music stars such as Sophie Ellis-Bextor, Norah Jones, M. Ward and Monrose.

On September 18, 2007, The Cloud Room self-released a follow-up EP to their debut album entitled Please Don't Almost Kill Me. The album includes a guest appearance by Columbia recording artist Nicole Atkins. There is also a limited-edition version packaged in melted jewel cases from J Stuart's apartment fire. Their debut cd was released in the UK on March 17, 2008 with new songs and artwork.

The band released what they called a "Fake 7"" on February 14, 2008. It required "playing" a 7" on a website to hear the songs. The A-side consists of "February 14" by Huggy Bear and Leonard Cohen's "Memories" on the B-side.

Bands The Cloud Room have toured or played with include Feist, Cut Copy, The Magic Numbers, The Go! Team, Pernice Brothers, Phosphorescent, The Dandy Warhols, Foreign Born, Editors, We Are Scientists, Maxïmo Park, Matt Pond PA, Film School, The National, Talkdemonic, End of Fashion, Van She, Elbow, Muse, Patrick Wolf, A Place to Bury Strangers, Working For A Nuclear Free City and Norah Jones.

Songs the band has been known to cover include "Always On My Mind", "Who Loves The Sun" by The Velvet Underground, "Strangers" by The Kinks, "Weird Fishes" by Radiohead and "Heroes" by David Bowie. Incidentally, David Bowie, The Arcade Fire and Spoon (band) are among the artists reported to have been at Cloud Room concerts.

In December 2008 the Cloud Room recorded an original Christmas song titled 'Melody, Like Snow' for a compilation called 'An Indiecater Christmas'.

In February 2010 they updated their website, saying that the album is just about done. It will be titled Zither. They also posted a new song entitled Crashing in Love.

== Discography ==
| Title | Release date | Notes | Label |
|---|---|---|---|
| The Cloud Room | April 19, 2005 | Debut album | Gigantic Records |
| Please Don't Almost Kill Me | September 18, 2007 | EP | self-released |
| The Cloud Room | March 17, 2008 | UK release with new artwork, songs, track list | A&G Records |
| Zither | April 24, 2012 | Second studio album | self-released |
