= Human Television =

Human Television is a Brooklyn, New York-, and sometimes Philadelphia-based indie music group. The band is composed of Billy Downing, Mario Lopez, Richard Beastmaster, Boyd Shropshire, Michael Johnson, Estelle Baruch, and Matt Kimmel. Originally from Florida, the band relocated to New York after being signed to Gigantic Music.

The band's debut album attracted critical attention as did their second release, Look at Who You're Talking To. The band has not released any new music since 2006.

== Albums ==
- All Songs Written by: Human Television (2004)
- Look at Who You're Talking To (2006)
