= Meneguar =

Indie rock band

- Origin: United States
- Genres: Indie rock, punk rock,
- Years active: 2005–2010
- Labels: Troubleman Unlimited; Woodsist; FuckItTapes
- Spinoff of: Woods, Shepards, Wooden Wand and the Vanishing Voice, Family Creeps, Little Gold

Meneguar /mɪˈnɛɡwɑːr/ was an indie rock band whose members had previously played under different arrangements and names but reached its current form in 2004 in Brooklyn, New York. The group released the albums I Was Born at Night and Strangers in Our House on the Troubleman Unlimited label. Hybrid Magazine positively reviewed Strangers in Our House, saying that, "Like a fucked up conglomeration of Modest Mouse and Q and Not U with a little The Flaming Lips thrown in for artistic sense, the band walks an interesting line that ebbs and flows across the album, moving with an energy that is addictively daunting and dauntingly addictive at the same time."

== Members ==
- Jeremy Earl
- Jarvis Taveniere
- Christian Deroeck
- Justin Wertz

== Discography ==
- I Was Born at Night LP. 2005. Narshaada Records.
- I Was Born at Night LP/CD. 2005. Magic Bullet Records
- "Bury a Flower" b/w "Freshman Thoughts". 7 inch. 2006. Troubleman Unlimited.
- I Was Born at Night. CD/LP. 2006. Troubleman Unlimited.
- I Was Born at Night + 7 inch. Cassette on FuckItTapes.
- Strangers in Our House. CD/LP. 2007. Troubleman Unlimited. Euro vinyl on Release the Bats.
- Tone Banks Vol. 1 – "Some Downs". Cassette. FuckItTapes, 2007.
- The In Hour CD/LP/CS. Woodsist, 2008.

=== I Was Born at Night ===
I Was Born at Night

Studio album by Meneguar
- Released: May 10, 2005
- Genre: Indie rock
- Length: 24:13
- Label: Magic Bullet Records; Troubleman Unlimited
- Producer: Mark Ospovat

Professional ratings
Review scores
Source	Rating
Allmusic	link

I Was Born at Night is the first album by Meneguar. Although originally released on Magic Bullet, the album was remixed, remastered, and re-released on Troubleman Unlimited on June 6, 2006.

==== Track listing ====
1. "House of Cats" – 3:46
2. "Kids Get Cut" – 2:07
3. "A Few Minutes an Hour" – 4:33
4. "The Temp" – 3:31
5. "Isn't Christmas" – 3:50
6. "Hands Off" – 3:17
7. "Wounded Knee" – 3:09
