= Fujiya & Miyagi =

British group

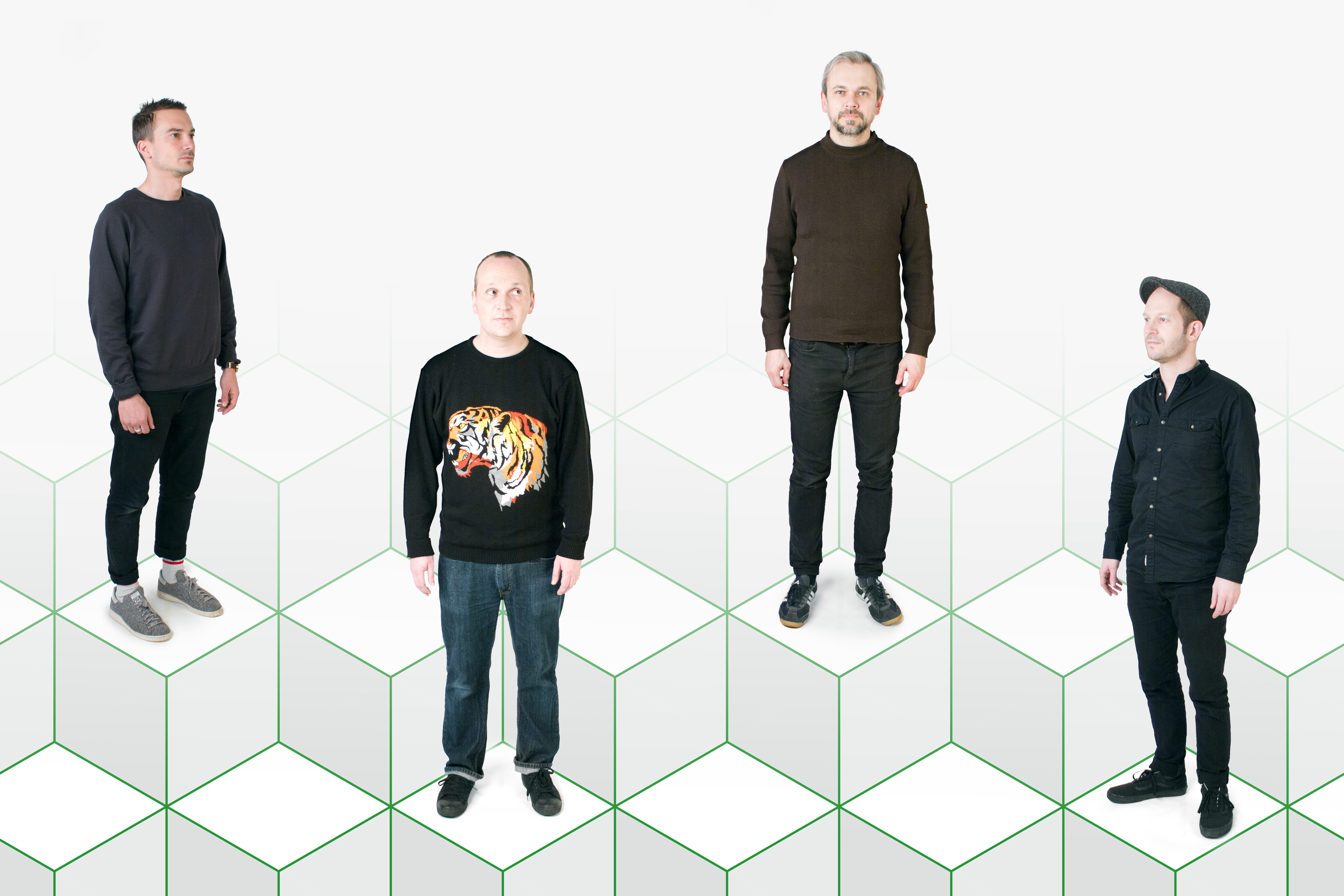

Background information
- Origin: Brighton, East Sussex, England
- Genres: Electronic; nu-disco; dance; Krautrock
- Years active: 2000-present
- Labels: Impossible Objects of Desire; Yep Roc Records; Full Time Hobby; Deaf Dumb & Blind; Groenland Records; Tirk Records; Massive Advance
- Members: David Best; Steve Lewis; Ed Chivers; Ben Adamo
- Past members: Matthew Hainsby; Lee Adams; Matthew Collins; Matthew Avery
- Website: www.fujiya-miyagi.co.uk

Fujiya & Miyagi are an English electronic band formed in Brighton, East Sussex, England in 2000. The current line-up consists of David Best (vocals and guitar), Stephen Lewis (synths and vocals), Ed Chivers (drums) and Ben Adamo (bass and vocals).

They have released nine studio albums: Electro Karaoke in the Negative Style (2002), Transparent Things (2006), Lightbulbs (2008), Ventriloquizzing (2011), Artificial Sweeteners (2014), Fujiya & Miyagi (2017), Different Blades from the Same Pair of Scissors (2017), Flashback (2019), and Slight Variations (2022). Their tenth LP, New Shiny Object, is scheduled to be released October 30, 2026. Following the release of Artificial Sweeteners, the band parted ways with Yep Roc Records and have subsequently released music via their own label, Impossible Objects of Desire.

== TV and game appearances ==
The band were the subject of an episode of the MTV2 documentary series This is Our Music in 2006.

Their song "Uh" was featured in an episode of Breaking Bad and an episode of British sci-fi series Misfits. "Collarbone" was featured on an episode of the US adaptation of the British teen drama Skins, while "Vagaries of Fashion" was featured on an episode of How To Get Away With Murder. "Collarbone" was featured in Skate It and Skate 2 in 2008 and 2009 respectively as part of both games' soundtracks. "Sore Thumb" was featured in NBA 2K10.

== Members ==
Current

- David Best – (2000–present)
- Steve Lewis – (2000–present)
- Ed Chivers – (2014–present)
- Ben Adamo – (2015–present)

Former

- Matthew Hainsby – (2005–2014)
- Lee Adams – (2008–2013)
- Matthew Collins – (2002–2005)
- Matthew Avery – (2002–2005)

== Name ==
Best has explained that "Fujiya" refers to Fujiya, a Japanese manufacturer of tape recorders and record players, and "Miyagi" refers to the character Mr. Miyagi from the film The Karate Kid, because the two names together "just looked really nice written down. And ["Fujiya and Miyagi"] was the only name we came up with."

== Discography ==
=== Studio albums ===
- Electro Karaoke in the Negative Style (2002, reissued 2008)
- Transparent Things (2006)
- Lightbulbs (2008) - UK number 187
- Ventriloquizzing (2011)
- Artificial Sweeteners (2014)
- Fujiya & Miyagi (2017)
- Different Blades from the Same Pair of Scissors (2017)
- Flashback (2019)
- Slight Variations (2022)
- New Shiny Object (2026)

=== Remix albums ===
- Remixes (2003)
