= Transparent Things (novel) =

1972 novel by Vladimir Nabokov

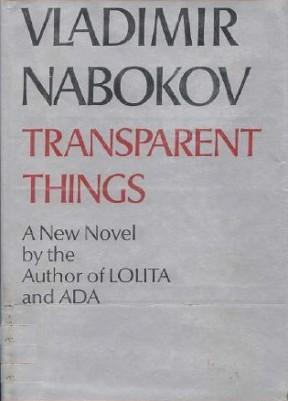
- First edition
- Author: Vladimir Nabokov
- Language: English
- Publisher: McGraw-Hill Companies
- Publication date: 1972
- Publication place: United States

Transparent Things is a novel by Vladimir Nabokov published in 1972. It was originally written in English.

== Plot summary ==
The short novel tells the story of Hugh Person, an American literary editor and proofreader, and his four trips to and from Switzerland over the course of almost two decades.

== Synopsis ==
Hugh Person first visits Switzerland as a young man with his father, who dies during the trip. A number of years later, Person undertakes a second trip on behalf of his publisher in order to liaise with R., a gifted if leisurely and eccentric author. In the process, he also makes the acquaintance of Armande, whom he later marries and moves to New York with. His third trip is taken in an attempt to persuade R. to make alterations to his latest manuscript, Tralatitions, which the author refuses to do, while Armande, who has come along with Hugh, is too late to see her dying mother one last time. After the two return, Person proofreads and edits R.'s contentious manuscript, and goes to bed with Armande. The police interrupt in order to interview him, and he tells them of having dreamt of the house being on fire as he restrained a series of flickering images of his companion, alternatingly Armande and other women he has known, from leaping out of it. Finally, Hugh visits and wanders through Switzerland alone, stopping by Armande's childhood home and the hotels the two have previously stayed in, having spent the past several years in a string of hospitals after having strangled Armande in a what Person claims to remember only as a state of particularly deep sleep, having since childhood been prone to episodes of sleepwalking aided only by inducing himself into dreams of playing tennis. A fire breaks out in the hotel Person is in and kills him as the author, or authors, of the tale ease him into the new state.

== Critical reception ==
In The New York Times Book Review, writer Mavis Gallant wrote, "Vladimir Nabokov, having spent his life building the Taj Mahal, has decided at the age of 73—for his own amusement and incidentally for our pleasure—to construct a small mock replica. The miniature is not flawed, no, but the most splendid features of the great model have been just slightly parodied, out of playfulness almost." Gallant found the short novel to be "as casual, as unpredictable, as eccentric and as daunting as Mr. Nabokov's genius."
