= Mayoralty of Michael Bloomberg =

2002–2013 mayoralty in New York City

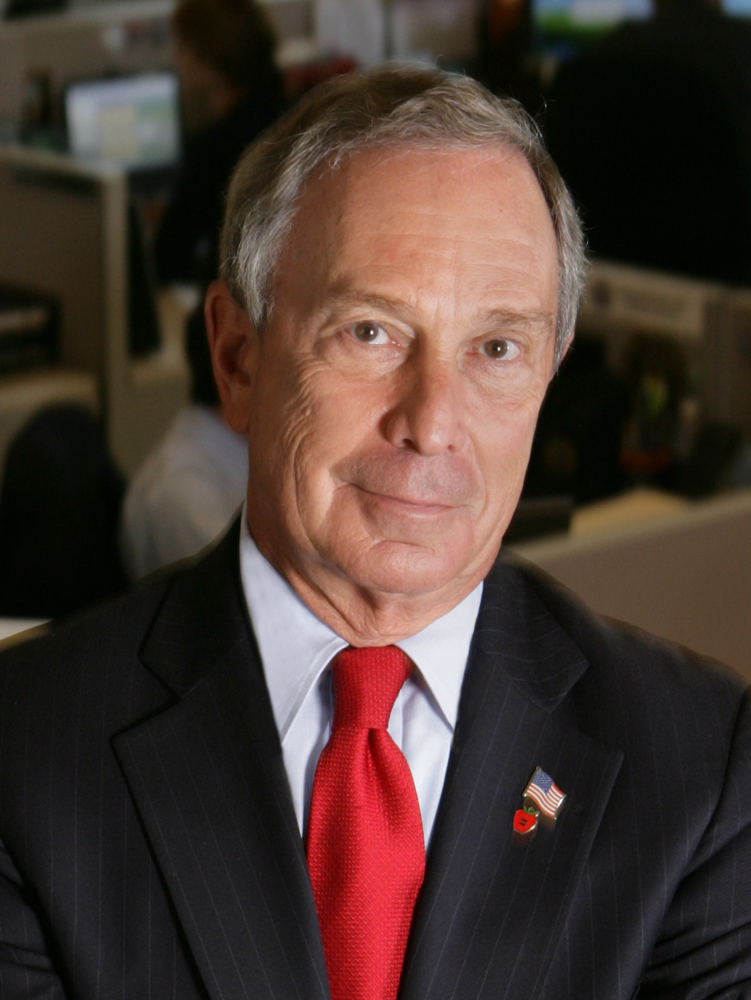
- Mayoralty of Michael Bloomberg; January 1, 2002 – December 31, 2013
- Mayor: Michael Bloomberg
- Party: Republican (2000–2007); Independent (2007–2013)
- Election: 2001; 2005; 2009
- Flag of the Mayor

The mayoralty of Michael Bloomberg began on January 1, 2002, when Michael Bloomberg was inaugurated as the 109th mayor of New York City, and ended on December 31, 2013.

Bloomberg was known as a political pragmatist, and for a managerial style that reflected his experience in the private sector. Bloomberg chose to apply a statistical approach to city management, appointing city commissioners based on their expertise and granting them wide autonomy in their decision-making. Breaking with 190 years of tradition, Bloomberg implemented a "bullpen" open plan office, reminiscent of a Wall Street trading floor, in which dozens of aides and managerial staff are seated together in a large chamber. The design was intended to promote accountability and accessibility. At the end of Bloomberg's three terms, The New York Times said, "New York is once again a thriving, appealing city where [...] the crime rate is down, the transportation system is more efficient, the environment is cleaner."

== Elections and re-elections ==
=== 2001 election ===
In 2001, the incumbent mayor of New York City, Rudy Giuliani, was ineligible for re-election, as the city limited the mayoralty to two consecutive terms. Several well-known New York City politicians aspired to succeed him. Bloomberg, a lifelong member of the Democratic Party, decided to run for mayor as a member of the Republican Party ticket.

Voting in the primary began on the morning of September 11, 2001. The primary was postponed later that day because of the terrorist attacks on the World Trade Center. In the rescheduled primary, Bloomberg defeated Herman Badillo, a former Congressman, to become the Republican nominee. Meanwhile, the Democratic primary did not produce a first-round winner. After a runoff, the Democratic nomination went to New York City Public Advocate Mark Green.

In the general election, Bloomberg received Giuliani's endorsement. He also had a huge spending advantage. Although New York City's public campaign finance law restricts the size of contributions which a candidate can accept, Bloomberg chose not to use public campaign funds and instead self-financed his campaign. He spent $73 million of his own money on his campaign, outspending Green five to one. One of the major themes of his campaign was that, with the city's economy suffering from the effects of the World Trade Center attacks, it needed a mayor with business experience.

In addition to serving as the Republican nominee, Bloomberg had the ballot line of the Independence Party. Under New York's fusion rules, a candidate can run on more than one party's line and combine all the votes received on all lines. Green, the Democrat, also had the ballot line of the Working Families Party. Bloomberg also created an independent line called Students First whose votes were combined with those on the Independence line. Overall, he won 50 percent to 48 percent.

Bloomberg's election marked the first time in New York City history that two different Republicans had been elected mayor consecutively. New York City has not been won by a Republican in a presidential election since Calvin Coolidge won in 1924. Bloomberg is considered a social liberal: He is pro-choice, favors legalizing same-sex marriage, and is an advocate for stricter gun control laws.

In 2002, Bloomberg delivered bids from New York City to host both the Democratic and Republican nominating conventions for the 2004 presidential campaign. The city won the bid to host the Republican National Convention in 2004. The convention drew thousands of protesters, many of them local residents angry over the Iraq War and other issues. The New York Police Department arrested approximately 1,800 protesters, but most of the cases were later dismissed.

=== 2005 election ===
Bloomberg was re-elected mayor in November 2005 by a margin of 20 percent, the widest margin ever for a Republican mayor of New York.

Bloomberg had spent $102 million on his campaign by late October 2005. In late 2004 or early 2005, Bloomberg gave the Independence Party of New York $250,000 to fund a phone bank seeking to recruit volunteers for his re-election campaign.

Former Bronx Borough President Fernando Ferrer won the Democratic nomination to oppose Bloomberg in the general election. Thomas Ognibene sought to run against Bloomberg in the Republican Party's primary election. Bloomberg's campaign successfully challenged enough of the signatures Ognibene had submitted to the Board of Elections to prevent Ognibene from appearing on ballots for the Republican primary. Instead, Ognibene ran only on the Conservative Party ticket. Ognibene accused Bloomberg of betraying Republican Party ideals, a feeling echoed by others.

Bloomberg opposed the confirmation of John Roberts as Chief Justice of the United States. Though a Republican at the time, Bloomberg is a staunch supporter of abortion rights and did not believe that Roberts was committed to maintaining Roe v. Wade.

In addition to receiving Republican support, Bloomberg obtained the endorsements of several prominent Democrats: former Democratic Mayor Ed Koch; former Democratic governor Hugh Carey; former Democratic City Council Speaker Peter Vallone, and his son, Councilman Peter Vallone, Jr.; former Democratic Congressman Floyd Flake (who had previously endorsed Bloomberg in 2001), and Brooklyn Borough President Marty Markowitz.

=== 2009 election ===
On October 2, 2008, Bloomberg announced that he would seek to extend the city's term limits law and run for a third mayoral term in 2009, arguing that a leader of his field was needed during the 2008 financial crisis. "Handling this financial crisis while strengthening essential services ... is a challenge I want to take on," Bloomberg said at a news conference. "So should the City Council vote to amend term limits, I plan to ask New Yorkers to look at my record of independent leadership and then decide if I have earned another term." Bloomberg promised Ronald Lauder, who wrote New York City's term limits in 1993 and spent over 4 million dollars of his own money to enable the maximum years a mayor could serve to eight years, a seat on an influential board; he agreed to stay out of future legality issues and sided with Bloomberg in running for a third term. NYPIRG filed a complaint with the City Conflict of Interest Board. On October 23, 2008, the City Council voted 29–22 in favor of extending the term limit to three consecutive four-year terms, thus allowing Bloomberg to run for office again. After two days of public hearings, Bloomberg signed the bill into law on November 3.

Bloomberg's bid for a third term generated some controversy. Civil libertarians such as former New York Civil Liberties Union Director Norman Siegel and New York Civil Rights Coalition Executive Director Michael Meyers joined with local politicians such as New York State Senator Eric Adams to protest the term limits extension.

Bloomberg's opponent was Democratic and Working Families Party nominee Bill Thompson, who had been New York City Comptroller for the past eight years and before that, President of the New York City Board of Education. Bloomberg defeated Thompson by a vote of 50.6 percent to 46.0 percent.

After the release of Independence Party campaign filings in January 2010, it was reported that Bloomberg had made two $600,000 contributions from his personal account to the Independence Party on October 30 and November 2, 2009. The Independence Party then paid $750,000 of that money to Republican Party political operative John Haggerty Jr.

This prompted an investigation beginning in February 2010 by the office of New York County District Attorney Cyrus Vance, Jr. into possible improprieties. The Independence Party later questioned how Haggerty spent the money, which was to go to poll-watchers. Former New York State Senator Martin Connor contended that because the Bloomberg donations were made to an Independence Party housekeeping account rather than to an account meant for current campaigns, this was a violation of campaign finance laws. Haggerty also spent money from a separate $200,000 donation from Bloomberg on office space. In 2011, Haggerty was convicted of stealing campaign funds from Bloomberg; he admitted his guilt and was sentenced to one and a third to four years in prison.

=== 2013 election endorsements ===
On September 13, 2013, Bloomberg announced that he would not endorse any of then current candidates to succeed him. On his radio show, he stated, "I don't want to do anything that complicates it for the next mayor. And that's one of the reasons I've decided I'm just not going to make an endorsement in the race." He added, "I want to make sure that person is ready to succeed, to take what we've done and build on that."

Prior to the announcement in an interview in New York magazine, Bloomberg praised the New York Times for its endorsement of Christine Quinn and Joe Lhota, respectively, as their favorite candidates in the Democratic and Republican primaries. Quinn came in third in the Democratic primary and Lhota won the Republican primary.

Earlier in the month, Bloomberg was chastised in the press for his remarks regarding Democratic mayoral candidate Bill de Blasio's campaign methods. Bloomberg said initially in the New York magazine interview that he considered de Blasio's campaign "racist".

Well, no, no, I mean he's making an appeal using his family to gain support. I think it's pretty obvious to anyone watching what he's been doing. I do not think he himself is racist. It's comparable to me pointing out I'm Jewish in attracting the Jewish vote. You tailor messages to your audiences and address issues you think your audience cares about.

== Public opinion ==
Throughout 2006 and 2007, Bloomberg had approval ratings consistently above 70%, according to the Quinnipiac University Polling Institute. Differences between Republican, Democratic and independent voters were small. "An effective, straightforward guy who calls it as it is – that's Mayor Bloomberg's most attractive quality, New Yorkers think. And they like his businessman approach to the job," said Quinnipiac polling director Maurice Carroll.

Bloomberg had a 49% approval rating in August 2010 compared to 56% in April. It also stated in August that 47% of Democratic voters expressed approval compared to 55% of Republican voters. Lee Miringoff, director of Marist College's Institute for Public Opinion, remarked that governing during a world economic recession coupled with Bloomberg's stance in support of the Islamic complex near Ground Zero (Bloomberg defended the owner's right to build when few other did) had dampened Bloomberg's polling numbers.

In November 2010, a Public Policy Polling survey of registered voters found that 19% expressed a favorable opinion of Bloomberg, while an 38% plurality expressed a negative view.

Five months before the end of Bloomberg's tenure, a New York Times survey placed his approval rating at 49%, against 40% who disapproved. In a January 2014 Quinnipiac poll, 64 percent of voters called Bloomberg's 12 years as mayor "mainly a success."

== Public initiatives ==
=== Infrastructure ===
==== Technology ====
Bloomberg came into office with a view that technology could not only make New York City government more efficient and responsive, but more transparent as well. His first major technology initiative was the consolidation of the City of New York's thousands of individual agency phone numbers into one three-digit number, 3–1–1. Bloomberg felt that a single phone number would be easy for New Yorkers to remember. The 311 deployment was of such importance that he assigned his daughter, Emma Bloomberg, who joined the administration without accepting a salary, to work closely with Commissioner Gino P. Menchini of the Department of Information Technology and Telecommunications (DoITT) to ensure that the project moved along swiftly. Although the project was greeted with skepticism, in 2003, 311 went live and it has since become one of the hallmark achievements of the Bloomberg Administration. In June 2007, 311 received its 50 millionth call, and Bloomberg himself fielded the 100 millionth call in May 2010.

Another of Bloomberg's technology initiatives was the creation of NYC Media. By virtue of the franchise agreements with the cable TV operators, New York City had always had access to valuable spectrum on local cable providers Cablevision and Time Warner Cable, but had made little use of the channels. Upon taking office in 2002, Bloomberg tapped two trusted campaign aides, Seth Unger and Arick Wierson, to revamp the city's cable channels. In 2003, Bloomberg unveiled their creation, a network called NYC TV. Unlike typical Government-access television (GATV) run local channels, NYC TV would be focused on local lifestyle and events, parks, history and culture. Some members of the New York City Council initially criticized the network for being overly preoccupied with ratings. Nonetheless, the network gained early traction, most notably for its coverage of the local fashion industry and local arts and music scene. Since its inception, NYC TV has gone on to absorb local broadcaster WNYE-TV and has emerged as the largest local broadcast network in the New York region with one full power broadcast station, four cable stations, and one FM Radio station, collectively now known as NYC Media. By many regards, Bloomberg's belief that NYC TV could reinvent the local television landscape largely held true. In 2006, WNBC entered into a large syndication agreement to air over 100 hours of NYC TV's original shows. The network has won numerous New York Emmys since its inception, and series such as "Secrets of New York" are being distributed nationally on PBS, DiSH Network, airlines and overseas. In April 2009, Bloomberg announced that NYC Media President Arick Wierson was returning to the private sector, and that Katherine Oliver, then the city's Film Commissioner, would be stepping into Wierson's former role as the top executive at the NYC TV stations.

==== Transportation ====
Bloomberg stated that he rides the New York City Subway on a daily basis, particularly in the commute from his home to his office at City Hall. An August 2007 story in The New York Times asserted that he was often seen chauffeured by two New York Police Department-owned SUVs to an express train station to avoid having to change from the local to the express trains on the IRT Lexington Avenue Line. He also supported the construction of the 7 Subway Extension and the Second Avenue Subway; on December 20, 2013, Bloomberg took a ceremonial ride on a train to the new 34th Street station to celebrate a part of his legacy as mayor.

==== Preservation and development ====
Bloomberg is a proponent of large-scale development often of under-used or vacant land including such projects as the Atlantic Yards development, the Hudson Yards redevelopment, and the Harlem rezoning proposal. Bloomberg supported a plan that preserved much of Admiral's Row. On historic preservation, Bloomberg created or extended more than 40 historic districts and vetoed landmark revocation for the Austin, Nichols and Company Warehouse. This move was widely applauded by architectural historians. The City Council overruled the veto shortly thereafter, however.

=== Economy ===
Bloomberg characterizes himself as a fiscal conservative for turning the city's $6 billion deficit into a $3 billion surplus; however, conservative PAC Club for Growth has criticized him because he increased property taxes and spending while doing so.

Being a fiscal conservative is not about slashing programs that help the poor, or improve health care, or ensure a social safety net. It's about insisting services are provided efficiently, get to only the people that need them, and achieve the desired results. Fiscal conservatives have hearts too – but we also insist on using our brains, and that means demanding results and holding government accountable for producing them.
To me, fiscal conservatism means balancing budgets – not running deficits that the next generation can't afford. It means improving the efficiency of delivering services by finding innovative ways to do more with less. It means cutting taxes when possible and prudent to do so, raising them overall only when necessary to balance the budget, and only in combination with spending cuts. It means when you run a surplus, you save it; you don't squander it. And most importantly, being a fiscal conservative means preparing for the inevitable economic downturns – and by all indications, we've got one coming.

— Michael Bloomberg, speech to UK Conservative Party, September 30, 2007

Bloomberg has expressed a distaste for taxes, stating, "Taxes are not good things, but if you want services, somebody's got to pay for them, so they're a necessary evil." As mayor, he did raise property taxes to fund budget projects; however, in January 2007 he proposed cuts in property taxes by five percent and cuts in sales taxes, including the elimination of taxes on clothing and footwear. Bloomberg pointed to the Wall Street profits and the real estate market as evidence that the city's economy is booming and could handle a tax break.

Bloomberg's self-described fiscal conservatism also led him to eliminate the existing $6-billion deficit when he assumed office. Bloomberg balanced the budget of New York City by raising property taxes and making cuts to city agencies. In 2004, the Bloomberg administration created a $400 property tax rebate for homeowners that offset the cost of a property tax increase passed in 2002 which helped balance the budget.

In the aftermath of the 9/11 attacks, Bloomberg and Governor George Pataki lobbied Goldman Sachs's then-CEO Hank Paulson to establish its headquarters across from Ground Zero by promising $1.65 billion in state and city tax breaks. Regarding this deal, Bloomberg stated, "This [New York City] is where the best want to live and work. So I told him [Paulson], 'We can help with minimizing taxes. Minimizing your rent. Improving security. But in the end, this is about people.'"

In 2002, when New York City's transit workers threatened to strike, Bloomberg responded by riding a mountain bike through the city to show how the city could deal with the transit strike by finding alternate means of transportation and not pandering to the unions. Three years later, a clash between Bloomberg and the New York City Transit Authority over wages and union benefits led to a full blown strike that lasted three days. Negotiations led to the end of the strike in December 2005, but controversy exists over Bloomberg's handling of the situation.

Bloomberg is a staunch advocate of free trade and is strongly opposed to protectionism, stating, "The things that we have to worry about is this protectionist movement that has reared its head again in this country. ... " He worries about the growth of China and fears the lessening gap between the United States and other countries: "The rest of the world is catching up, and, there are people that say, surpassing us. I hope they are wrong. I hope those who think we are still in good shape are right. But nevertheless, the time to address these issues is right now."

Bloomberg has placed a strong emphasis on public health and welfare, adopting many liberal policies. As the mayor he made HIV, diabetes, and hypertension all top priorities. In 2003, he implemented a successful smoking ban in all indoor workplaces, including bars and restaurants, and many other cities and states followed suit. Bloomberg has been a strong supporter of the New York City Health and Hospitals Corporation – the largest urban healthcare agency in the United States – serving over 1.3 million New Yorkers, and has touted its use of information technology and Electronic Health Records to increase efficiency and enhance patient care. He launched a program called Opportunity NYC which is the nation's first-ever conditional cash transfer pilot program designed to help New Yorkers break the cycle of poverty in the city. He instituted a $7.5 billion municipal affordable housing plan, the largest in the nation, that is supposed to provide 500,000 New Yorkers with housing.

Bloomberg has expressed concern about poverty and growing class divisions, stating, "This society cannot go forward, the way we have been going forward, where the gap between the rich and the poor keeps growing."

=== Environment ===
Bloomberg was one of the most active big city mayors on the issue of the environment. On April 22, 2007, he announced PLANYC: an aggressive program to vastly improve New York City's environmental sustainability by 2030. On May 23, 2007, Bloomberg announced that by 2012, all the city's medallion taxis will be hybrid cars. PLANYC aims to improve the city's sustainability through a multi-pronged approach that includes, among other things, the adoption of traffic congestion pricing based upon a system currently used in London and Singapore. Bloomberg contended this measure would reduce pollution and traffic congestion while raising revenue for the city. He also pledged to plant one million trees in New York City, in an effort to clean the air and boost property values.

Bloomberg's DEP Commissioner Christopher O. Ward was able to implement the Long Island Sound Nitrogen Reduction Program, federal approval of the Filtration Avoidance Agreement for the Protection and Water Quality of the Upstate Reservoir System, and the funding and completion of the Manhattan segment of the third water tunnel.

In 2012, air quality in the city was the cleanest it had been in 50 years under Bloomberg.

In dealing with global warming and New York's role in it, Bloomberg enacted a plan called PlaNYC: A Greener, Greater New York to fight global warming, protect the environment and prepare New York for the projected 1 million more people expected to be living in the city by the year 2030. Bloomberg has been involved in motivating other cities to make changes, delivering the keynote address at the C40 Large Cities Climate Summit and stating, "[W]e now know beyond a doubt that global warming is a reality. And the question we must all answer is, what are we going to do about it?" Bloomberg also talked about how he would go about fighting climate change by reducing carbon dioxide emissions, using cleaner and more efficient fuels, and encouraging public transportation. His ideas have occasionally been rejected, such as the New York State Assembly's rejection of his idea for applying congestion pricing below 60th Street in Manhattan.

On February 14, 2013, Bloomberg called for a ban on Styrofoam food packaging. He asked to begin recycling more plastics and food waste.

On February 21, 2013, Bloomberg spoke with oil tycoon T. Boone Pickens in support of a new eco-friendly food truck. A press conference took place in front of city hall where the company, Neapolitan Express, explained how their mobile pizzeria emits 75% less greenhouse gases than trucks running on gas or diesel. The company was expected to launch early 2013.

=== Social issues ===
==== Same-sex marriage ====
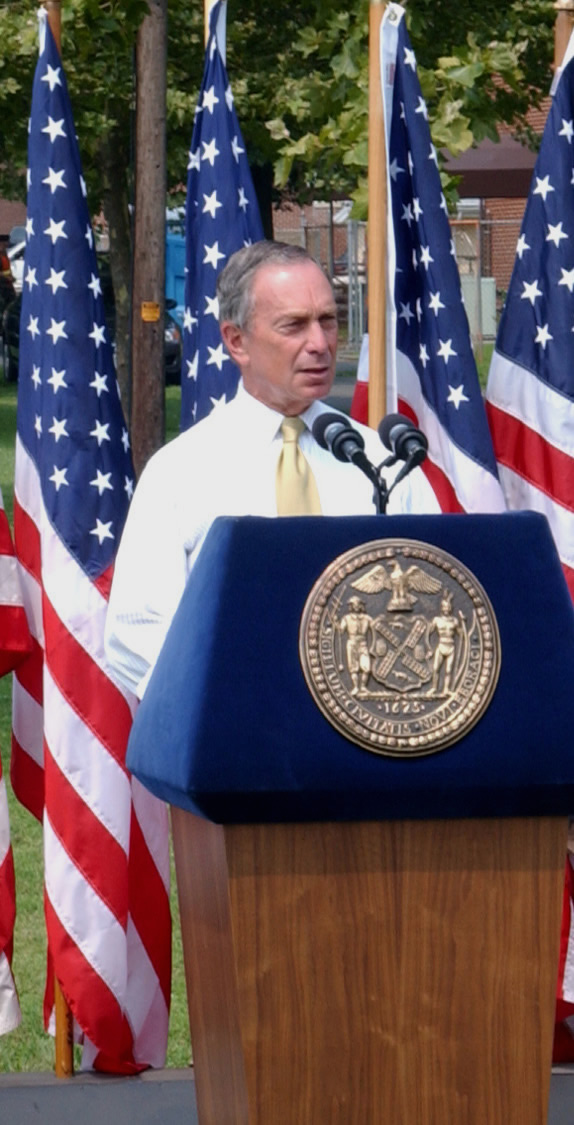
Bloomberg giving a speech in August 2004

Bloomberg supported the legalization of same-sex marriage in New York. Still, he appealed a decision finding the limiting of same-sex marriage in the state of New York unconstitutional. "My personal opinion is that anybody should be allowed to marry anybody. I don't happen to think we should put restrictions on who you should marry. ... What the city doesn't want to have happen is people getting a marriage license and then six months, or one year later, or two years later, finding out it's meaningless," he said.

==== Immigration ====
Bloomberg was a supporter of immigration reform to secure the rights of undocumented immigrants, who comprise a large part of the population of New York City. He argued that deportation breaks up families and scares undocumented immigrants away from cooperating with law enforcement or accessing vital social services; as such, he supported proposals like those put forth by U.S. Senators Ted Kennedy and John McCain, which would normalize the status of otherwise law-abiding undocumented immigrants already present. Bloomberg also believed that border enforcement is somewhat futile. He told the US Senate Judiciary Committee Field Hearing on Federal Immigration Legislation on July 5, 2006: "It is as if we expect border control agents to do what a century of communism could not: Defeat the natural forces of supply and demand and defeat the natural human instinct for freedom and opportunity. You might as well sit on the beach and tell the tide not to come in."

He also issued Executive Order 41 on September 17, 2003, which instructs city employees not to ask nor to disclose information about immigration status unless required by law or organizational mission.

==== Crime ====
During Bloomberg's tenure, the reduction of crime that began during Mayor Rudy Giuliani's tenure continued. Bloomberg's approach to the issue was more low-key than that of Giuliani, who was often criticized by advocates for the homeless and civil rights groups. However, there exists some criticism that the reduced-crime statistics are frequently falsified or doctored to exaggerate the reduction. According to Salon.com, "[w]hile Bloomberg has kept aspects of the Giuliani management style in place, he has seriously dialed back the shouty rhetoric."

Raymond Kelly, Bloomberg's police commissioner from 2002, in his financial disclosures, "reported six shared plane flights to Florida in 2008 and five more in 2009, provided by Mayor ... Bloomberg at an undetermined cost."

Bloomberg came under fire for supporting the NYPD's stop and frisk program, which has been criticized for unfairly targeting African Americans and Latinos. In response to allegations that the program unfairly targets African-American and Hispanic-American individuals, then-Mayor Michael Bloomberg has stated that it is because African-Americans and Hispanic-Americans are more likely to be violent criminals and victims of violent crime. In a June 2013 interview with WOR Radio, Bloomberg explained

One newspaper and one news service, they just keep saying 'oh it's a disproportionate percentage of a particular ethnic group.' That may be, but it's not a disproportionate percentage of those who witnesses and victims describe as committing the [crime]. In that case, incidentally, I think we disproportionately stop whites too much and minorities too little.

In February 2020, an audio recording surfaced of Michael Bloomberg defending the program at a February 2015 Aspen Institute event. In the speech, Bloomberg said:

Ninety-five percent of murders—murderers and murder victims fit one M.O. You can just take the description, Xerox it, and pass it out to all the cops. They are male, minorities, 16 to 25. That's true in New York, that's true in virtually every city (inaudible). And that's where the real crime is. You've got to get the guns out of the hands of people that are getting killed. So you want to spend the money on a lot of cops in the streets. Put those cops where the crime is, which means in minority neighborhoods. So one of the unintended consequences is people say, 'Oh my God, you are arresting kids for marijuana that are all minorities.' Yes, that's true. Why? Because we put all the cops in minority neighborhoods. Yes, that's true. Why do we do it? Because that's where all the crime is. And the way you get the guns out of the kids' hands is to throw them up against the wall and frisk them... And then they start... 'Oh I don't want to get caught.' So they don't bring the gun. They still have a gun, but they leave it at home.

==== Terrorism ====
Beginning in 2003, Bloomberg became increasingly assertive in demanding that federal homeland security funds be distributed to municipalities based on risk – such as New York City – and population rather than any other measure. In an appearance before the United States Senate he argued that federal security funds should not be indiscriminately distributed, spread like "peanut butter."

In 2008, Bloomberg, along with New York City Police Commissioner Raymond Kelly, launched the Lower Manhattan Security Initiative, a security and surveillance network designed to detect terrorist threats. The initiative spearheaded the installation of over 3,000 new security cameras in Lower Manhattan, as well as 100 automatic number plate recognition devices which are intended to scan plates and compare the numbers with information in a database.

===== Warrantless surveillance of Muslims =====
After the September 11 attacks, with assistance from the Central Intelligence Agency, Bloomberg's administration oversaw a controversial "suspicionless domestic surveillance" program through the New York City Police Department that surveilled Muslim communities on the basis of their religion, ethnicity, and language. An eight-person NYPD unit profiled and surveilled schools, bookstores, cafes, restaurants, nightclubs, and every single mosque within 100 miles (160 km) of New York City using undercover informants and officers. The program was exposed in 2011 by the Associated Press in a Pulitzer Prize-winning series of investigative reports. The program was discontinued in 2014.

===== Gun control =====
Bloomberg is a strong advocate of gun control and made it a major issue of his administration in his second inaugural address. As of 2006, most of the beneficiaries of his donations to Congressional candidates, however, were opponents of gun control. Those incumbent Congressmen have had high ratings ("A" to "B+") from interest groups (e.g., National Rifle Association of America, Gun Owners of America) which oppose gun control.

Bloomberg once said, "I don't know why people carry guns. Guns kill people ...". Bloomberg is also a co-chair and founder of Mayors Against Illegal Guns Coalition, an organization of 210 mayors whose stated goal is working toward eradicating the use of illegal firearms by criminals.

In 2006, Bloomberg conducted a number of sting operations in gun stores outside his state. In these, city-paid private investigators attempted to illegally purchase handguns for other people (known as a "straw purchase"). Bloomberg then brought civil charges against stores that did not submit to extensive monitoring from representatives of New York City. Reaction to the sting operations was overwhelmingly negative in states where he conducted his sting, prompting an investigation by the Bureau of Alcohol Tobacco and Firearms to determine whether Bloomberg's "sting" violated any federal gun purchase laws. Many Second Amendment advocacy groups referred to the mayor's actions as "vigilante." The Virginia Citizen's Defense League held a raffle, dubbed the "Bloomberg Gun Giveaway" to help raise sales at affected stores within the commonwealth. This, in turn, was received poorly by many groups, especially after the then-recent Virginia Tech shooting. The Commonwealth of Virginia overwhelmingly passed legislation against simulated straw purchases such as this, and communicated such personally to Bloomberg.

==== Tax and fiscal policies ====
Facing a severe fiscal crisis after the September 11, 2001 attacks, Bloomberg introduced a $3 billion tax increase in the middle of the fiscal 2003 year while also cutting spending. The move is credited with stabilizing the city's finances, which recovered. Some critics, however, opined that he should have only cut government spending instead of raising taxes.

In 2004 and 2005, the city experienced record surpluses, but financial experts and Bloomberg administration officials warned about unfunded future pension costs owed to city workers. In response, in 2006 Bloomberg set aside $2 billion for a city-retirees' health fund. Some critics, however, characterized this move as representing a lack of political courage on Bloomberg's part insofar as he did it to avoid facing the prospect of reducing New York City government payrolls, a move which they argued would have provided a more fiscally responsible long-term solution. Some of these critics claim that bloated government payrolls are one of the main reasons why New York City has one of the highest tax rates in the United States. Nevertheless, by 2013, the Bloomberg administration had reduced the number of city employees by around 10,000 according to the New York City Independent Budget Office.

In August 2010, Bloomberg made controversial comments on a radio show, referring to uncollected taxes on cigarettes sold on Indian reservations in New York State. Bloomberg commented facetiously that the governor should, "you know, get yourself a cowboy hat and a shotgun. If there's ever a great video, it's you standing in the middle of the New York State Thruway saying, you know, 'Read my lips: The law of the land is this, and we're going to enforce the law.'" His statement was criticized by the Seneca Nation of Indians, as well as the National Congress of American Indians. Members of the Oneida Nation also protested in front of New York City Hall. Bloomberg's office later said that the Indian tribes should "follow the law" and that he would not apologize for his comments.

==== Housing ====
Over the three years prior to June 2006, housing rents in New York City rose faster than inflation while inflation-adjusted incomes fell, according to a report by New York University.

The report indicated that New Yorkers with low or moderate incomes spent increasing proportions of their wages and salaries on housing costs. The quantity of units available at rents affordable to city households earning 42 percent or less fell by 205,000 units in three years prior to the report. Lower-income residents had greater difficulty with the housing cost changes. During the period from 2002 to 2005, low-income families (in private-market housing) spent 43.9 percent of their incomes on rent, on average.

Bloomberg increased city funding for the new development of affordable housing through a plan that created and preserved an estimated 160,000 affordable homes in the city.

===== Commission on LGBTQ+ Homeless Youth =====
In 2010, a commission of 24 leaders wrote a report to advise the Mayor's office on the problem of LGBTQ+ youth without homes or shelter. The commission submitted 10 recommendations for how to address LGBTQ+ youth homelessness, including "Family Matters," which focused on family reconciliation and the formation of family support networks, and the establishment of alternative family structures. Additional recommendations were LGBTQ+ health services and improving coordination of LGBTQ+ organizations. The health services subgroup named, "Improving LGBTQ Runaway and Homeless Youth Services," focused on social services and public health education. The group called "Building Constituencies" was directed to help youth organizations and agencies find common ground on ways to support LGBTQ+ youth.

===== Development =====
Mayor Bloomberg and his Deputy Mayor for Economic Development & Rebuilding Daniel L. Doctoroff oversaw one of New York City's most dramatic economic resurgences, spearheading the effort to reverse New York's fiscal crisis after the attacks of 9/11 through a five-borough economic development strategy. By focusing on making New York's economy more diverse, its business climate more hospitable, and its communities more livable, they helped lead New York to its strongest economic position in decades. In 2005, the city achieved record levels of jobs, visitors, population, and the greatest number of housing starts since the 1960s.

One of Mayor Bloomberg's largest successes in New York City development was to revitalize Brooklyn Bridge Park, a design process funded by a long-term financial model to develop various structures throughout the park, including the adaptive reuse of Empire Stores in DUMBO. Midtown Equities, in partnership with Rockwood Capital and HK Organization, was chosen to redevelop the historic warehouses, with design by Studio V Architecture.

===== Poverty =====
Bloomberg planned to make poverty reduction the central focus of his second term. In 2006 he appointed a Commission on Economic Opportunity to come up with innovative ideas to address poverty in the city. The commission's initial report was released in September 2006.

According to the United States Census Bureau the city's poverty rate of 19 percent in 2004 had not changed since 2001, while in Manhattan the earnings of the top fifth of earners ($330,244 on average) were 41 times the earnings of the bottom fifth ($8,019 on average). Bronx County is the second poorest urban county in the United States, with a per capita income of $13,595 (after El Paso County, Texas); Kings County, which is coterminous with Brooklyn, has a per capita of $16,775, which is lower than the 2000 per capita income of New Orleans. In 2004, the Census' American Community Survey reported, Latinos had the highest poverty rate in the city (29 percent), compared to Blacks (21 percent), Asians (18 percent) and non-Latino Whites (11 percent). Although in 2005 Latinos made up 28 percent of the New York City's total population, they made up 42 percent of its poverty population. The Mayor's Commission, however, was criticized by advocacy groups like the National Institute for Latino Policy, for not addressing the problem of high and persistent poverty in the Latino community, pointing to the underrepresentation of Latinos on the commission (only 4 out of 32 commissioners are Latino) and its leadership (no Latinos).

The Mayor's Commission issued a 52-page report on September 18, 2006, entitled, Increasing Opportunity and Reducing Poverty in New York City, arguing that it would be counterproductive to try to focus on everyone's problems, and instead would concentrate on three groups: very young children, young adults, and the working poor. By targeting these critical groups, the Commission believed it could best combat poverty overall. However, the focus was criticized by those who would like a focus on other groups—including the elderly, the unemployed, the homeless, and those recently released from prison. The New York Times reported that little new city money was likely to be invested to fight poverty; management reform was the main source of improvements. For example, the Times noted that food stamp administration would be important for all three of the groups targeted by the commission. Food stamps are fully funded by the federal government, so any expansion of their use would be a cost-free reform for the city.

In late May 2011, he was criticized for a budget proposal which would close 110 day care centers in the city, according to the public advocate's office.

In 2013, Bloomberg was honored by the Children's Aid Society for his work to combat poverty in the city. Between 2000 and 2013, a period during which the poverty rate nationally climbed 28 percent, New York City's poverty rate remained unchanged. It was the only one of the nation's 20 largest cities to hold the line on poverty during that time.

==== Education ====
After winning election, Bloomberg convinced the state legislature to grant him authority over the city's public school system. From 1968 until 2002, New York City's schools were managed by the Board of Education, which had seven members. Only two of the seven were appointed by the mayor, which meant the city had a minority of representatives on the board and the mayor's ability to shape education policy was greatly diminished. In addition to the Board, 25 local school boards also played a part in running the system. In 2002, at Bloomberg's urging, the local boards and Board of Education were abolished and replaced with a new mayoral agency, the Department of Education.

Bloomberg appointed Joel Klein as Schools Chancellor to run the new department, which was based at the renovated Tweed Courthouse near City Hall. Under Bloomberg and Chancellor Klein, test scores rose, and the City obtained a higher percentage of funding from the state budget. Graduation rates also increased. Bloomberg opposed social promotion, and favored after-school and summer-school programs to help schoolchildren catch up, rather than allowing them to advance to the next grade level where they may be unprepared. Despite often tense relations with teachers' unions, he avoided a teacher strike by concluding a contract negotiation in which teachers received an average raise of 15% in exchange for givebacks and productivity increases. Teachers overall got a 43 percent salary increase

Bloomberg enforced a strengthened cell-phone ban in city schools that had its roots dating to a 1988 school system ban on pagers. The ban is controversial among some parents, who are concerned with their ability to contact their children. Administration representatives noted that students are distracted in class by cell phones and often use them inappropriately, in some instances sending and receiving text messages, taking photographs, surfing the Internet, and playing video games, and that cell-phone bans exist in other cities including Detroit and Philadelphia.

On May 27, 2007, Bloomberg announced that the four-year high school graduation rate in New York City had reached 60%, the highest level since the city began calculating the rate in 1986 and an 18% increase since the Mayor assumed control of the public schools in 2002.

On June 30, 2009, mayoral control lapsed as the New York State Senate declined to renew it. However, mayoral control was restored less than two months later, with a few amendments. Mayoral control allows New York's mayor to have, in practice, complete control of the school system.

==== Health ====
Bloomberg donated millions of dollars to the Johns Hopkins Bloomberg School of Public Health and appointed Dr. Thomas R. Frieden to be his Health Commissioner. Under Frieden, the New York City Department of Health prioritized reducing cases of HIV, diabetes and hypertension.

Bloomberg extended New York City's smoking ban to all commercial establishments, including bars and nightclubs. This reform removed the last indoor public areas in which one could smoke in the city. The smoking ban took effect in March 2003 and remains part of city law today. Bloomberg's smoking ban was considered trendsetting and many municipalities in North America and Europe have subsequently enacted similar bans.

In June 2005 Bloomberg signed the Potty Parity bill requiring more women's toilets in newly opened public places such as bars, theaters, stadiums and convention facilities

On December 5, 2006, New York City became the first city in the United States to ban trans-fat from all restaurants. This went into effect in July 2008.

In January 2010, the Bloomberg administration unveiled a plan to reduce the amount of salt in packages and food served at restaurants by 25 percent by 2015.

In May 2012, Bloomberg announced a plan to restrict the sale of sugary soft drinks in venues, restaurants and sidewalk carts to 16 ounces (473 ml). This prompted criticism that he was promoting Big Government and the "nanny state". On March 11, 2013, the day before the New York City soft drink size limit rule was to go into effect, New York Supreme Court Judge Milton Tingling ruled that the city health board did not have the authority to limit or ban a legal item under the guise of "controlling a chronic disease." The striking down of the ban was upheld unanimously by an appellate court (4–0) on July 30.

On March 18, 2013, Bloomberg said he wanted legislation to keep cigarettes out of sight in New York City stores. He announced his proposed "Tobacco Product Display Bill", which would have required all stores to keep cigarettes hidden from plain view.

== Political relations ==
=== Support for congressional candidates in and out of the New York area ===
Since 2000, Bloomberg has donated to dozens of candidates for the United States Congress. The candidates have been on both sides of the aisle. In July 2016, Bloomberg spoke at the Democratic National Convention, endorsing former Secretary of State Hillary Clinton's presidential bid. In June 2018, Bloomberg announced he would spend $80 million to support Democratic candidates in an effort to reverse control of Congress in the midterm elections.

=== 2004 Republican National Convention ===
While Bloomberg was mayor, New York City hosted the 2004 Republican National Convention, to the opposition of thousands of residents of the heavily Democratic city.

At the convention, Bloomberg endorsed George W. Bush for president.

Bloomberg was particularly criticized for his handling of protest activity. Almost 2,000 protesters were detained at a former bus garage on Pier 57 characterized by opponents as a "Guantanamo on the Hudson".

The Parks Department denied a permit for an anti-war march organized by United for Peace and Justice, set to end at Central Park's Great Lawn, and also denied a permit for the group's rally there. Critics cited this as abridging First Amendment rights. Defenders claim the decision was due to the fact that the Central Park Conservancy had spent tens of millions of dollars during the 1990s on redoing the lawn and on adding a new drainage system, and a march and/or rally would have virtually destroyed the lawn and taken several months to repair before it could be again used, and thus any large organized gatherings on the lawn are prohibited, except for the annual free concerts by the New York Philharmonic and the Metropolitan Opera.

The National Council of Arab Americans and the ANSWER Coalition, two groups sponsoring a planned march and rally, have sued the city in federal court for the denial of the Great Lawn permits. In addition to claiming that a large gathering would have damaged the newly renovated Great Lawn, the city also claimed it could not provide adequate police protection, and that the protesters failed to provide a rain date for the gathering. The July 31, 2006 edition of The New York Times reported that court documents appeared to indicate the Parks Department turned down the permits in order to shield Republican visitors from the protests. The documents include several emails and legal memoranda from city officials.

Several of the documents in question indicate that Bloomberg received regular updates regarding the status of the permits. For example, an email from Parks Commissioner Adrian Benepe informed Bloomberg that "following your call," he received assurance that the denial letter would go out on July 11. Benepe also went to the Great Lawn himself to see if there was any activity and personally emailed the mayor to let him know there was no demonstration there.

=== 9/11 first responders ===
On August 14, 2006, Governor George Pataki signed legislation ordering the city to pay increased amounts in death benefits for rescue workers or "first responders", such as fire department and police department members who later died from illnesses such as cancer after working at the World Trade Center site. Bloomberg objected to the proposal, arguing that the increased cost of $5 million to $10 million a year would be unduly burdensome for the city. The responders and the city additionally conflicted with each other over the issue of payments for health costs of the living among the first responders. On October 17, 2006, federal judge Alvin K. Hellerstein rejected New York City's motion to dismiss lawsuits that requested health payments to the first responders.

Bloomberg was criticized for not allowing many emergency officials who responded to the September 11, 2001, attacks to attend the tenth anniversary observation of that day. He was also at odds with many around the U.S. for not inviting any clergy to the ceremony marking the anniversary of the 9/11 attacks.

=== Statements concerning the Iraq war ===
In 2004, during a joint news conference with First Lady Laura Bush in lower Manhattan, he came to her support on the topic of Iraq, saying, "Don't forget that the war started not very many blocks from here."

In March 2007, during a news conference in Staten Island, Bloomberg declared his strong opposition to legislation proposed in Congress calling for a clear timetable for troop withdrawal. He said, "We ask our young men and women to go over and to fight, and if you have a deadline knowing they're pulling out, how can you expect them to defend this country? How can you expect them to go out and put their lives at risk? I just think that's untenable and that this is not a responsible piece of legislation. It is totally separate of how we're conducting the war. It's totally separate of whether we should have been there. The issue that you asked about is plain and simple: Should the Congress pass a law forcing the president to withdraw troops at a given point in time? I think that is not something that is in the country's interest or in the military's interest."

Political offices
Preceded by Rudy Giuliani	Mayor of New York City; 2002–2013	Succeeded by Bill de Blasio
