= Mayor's Office of Film, Theatre & Broadcasting =

New York City media and entertainment office

The City of New York Mayor’s Office of Media and Entertainment

Agency overview
- Preceding agency: Mayor's Advisory Council on Motion Pictures and Television
- Headquarters: 120 Broadway New York, NY 10217
- Agency executive: Rafael Espinal, Commissioner of MOME
- Parent agency: Mayor's Office of Media and Entertainment
- Website: http://www1.nyc.gov/site/mome/index.page

The Mayor's Office of Media and Entertainment (MOME) is an office of the Government of New York City that coordinates city policy and programs involving film, television, theater, music, publishing, advertising, digital media and other creative industries. Its responsibilities include facilitating film and television production on city property, overseeing the municipal broadcast network NYC Media, administering New York City's press credentialing system, and operating workforce and industry-development programs.

In 2020, Mayor Michael Bloomberg established MOME by combining the Mayor's Office of Film, Theatre and Broadcasting (MOFTB), NYC Media and the city's digital coordination functions under a single office. Its film office came about by reforms introduced by Mayor John Lindsay in 1966 to organize location filming in New York City.

== History ==
=== Film office origins ===
During the 1960s, film and television productions shooting in New York City had to obtain approvals from numerous municipal departments. In 1966, Mayor John Lindsay streamlined the system, giving the Department of Commerce authority to issue a single permit for filming on city-owned property and reducing the number of separate municipal approvals required for location filming.

The Lindsay administration also designated a liaison to assist production companies with privately owned locations and established a specialized police unit to work with film productions.

Mayor Abraham Beame expanded the city's involvement with the industry in 1974 by establishing the Mayor's Advisory Council on Motion Pictures and Television. Walter Wood served as director of the council and worked to attract production investment to the city.

Following a decline in New York-based production and a labor dispute involving film studios and theatrical unions, Mayor David Dinkins appointed film producer Richard Brick to head the film office in November 1992. The office was elevated to cabinet status in 1993, with Brick serving as its first commissioner.

Film production increased during Brick's tenure. In October 1993, the Los Angeles Times reported that permits issued for feature films during the first eight months of the year went from 54 to 96 compared with the same period in 1992.

During the Bloomberg administration, the office expanded programs designed to attract and support film and television production and to train workers for the industry. These included the Made in NY initiative and the Made in NY Production Assistant Training Program.

=== Creation and expansion of MOME ===
In July 2010, Bloomberg established the Mayor's Office of Media and Entertainment, combining MOFTB with NYC Media and citywide digital coordination functions. Katherine Oliver, who had served as film commissioner since 2002 and was also overseeing NYC Media, became commissioner of the combined office. MOFTB continued within MOME as the city's Film Office, and had responsibility for film and television permitting and production coordination.

MOME's mandate expanded beyond film and television. In 2016, under Mayor Bill de Blasio and commissioner Julie Menin, the office added music, advertising, publishing, digital content and creative-sector real estate to its portfolio.

The same year, the city established a $5 million fund supporting film and theater projects by and about women, along with related training and professional-development programs. The Los Angeles Times reported that New York was the first U.S. municipality to finance such an initiative.

The city's Office of Nightlife, created by local law in 2017, began operations within MOME in 2018. In 2023, Mayor Eric Adams transferred the Office of Nightlife from MOME to the New York City Department of Small Business Services.

In January 2022, Local Law 46 of 2021 transferred responsibility for issuing New York City press credentials from the New York City Police Department to MOME. MOME, which then established a Press Credentials Office to administer the system.

== Organization and functions ==
As of 2026, MOME has four principal divisions: the Film Office, NYC Media, the Press Credentials Office, and Programs and Initiatives.

=== Film Office ===
The Film Office, also known as the Mayor's Office of Film, Theatre and Broadcasting, coordinates film and television production in public locations throughout the five boroughs. It administers production permits and works with other municipal agencies on street closures, parking, police assistance and other services required for filming.

A 2015 Comptroller audit found that the city incurred at least $3.9 million in direct film-production service costs in fiscal 2013 while MOFTB collected about $1 million in application fees. The Comptroller recommended restructuring fees to recover more of the city's costs. MOFTB responded that the city's low-fee policy was intended to encourage production and agreed to consider the recommendations..

=== Press Credentials Office ===
The Press Credentials Office administers New York City's press credentialing system and issues standard, reserve and single-event press cards.

=== NYC Media ===
MOME oversees NYC Media, the official broadcast network and media production group of the City of New York. Its operations include municipal television channels, radio station WNYE and digital media services.

=== Programs and initiatives ===
MOME administers workforce development, education and industry programs across the city's creative sectors. These have included Made in NY training programs and initiatives involving film and television, theater, music, publishing, advertising and digital media.

== Leadership ==
The mayor appoints MOME commissioners. Rafael Espinal, a former member of the New York City Council and former executive director of the Freelancers Union, was appointed commissioner by Mayor Zohran Mamdani in January 2026.

== See also ==
- Media in New York City
- WNYE-TV
