= WNYE =

WNYE may refer to:

- WNYE (FM), a radio station (91.5 FM) licensed to New York, New York, United States
- WNYE-TV, a television station (channel 24, virtual 25) licensed to New York, New York, United States
