= Made in NYC =

Made in NYC may refer to:

- Made in N.Y.C. (album), 2007 live album by the Casualties
- Made in NYC (nonprofit), a nonprofit initiative

== See also ==
- Made in NY
