= Made in NY =

Marketing campaign

Made in NY is an incentive program and marketing campaign of the City of New York Mayor's Office of Film, Theatre & Broadcasting (MOFTB).

== Overview ==
Launched in 2004 by then-Mayor Michael Bloomberg, the original Made in NY program provided tax credits, marketing credits, concierge services, and access to new or expanding facilities such as sound-stages and production complexes to television and film productions that completed at least 75% of their shooting and rehearsal work in New York City. Qualified productions are also able to display the Made in NY logo in their closing credits.

While there are many variables for industry growth, the Made in NY program has been one contributor to the exponential growth in the creative industries in New York City since 2004. In 2019, New York City creative industries accounted for more than 440,000 local jobs and an economic impact of $150 billion annually.

== Program expansions ==
=== Career training initiatives ===
- The Made in NY Production Assistant Training Program, a free, month-long training program for eligible New York City residents, was launched in February 2006. Graduates of the PA training program were showcased each month on the MOFTB website. James Adames, for example, was the June 2011 PA of the Month. He later became a TV/Film Producer & Location Manager, and his story was picked up by the New York Daily News.
- The Made in NY Post Production Training Program is a free, 5-week training program for eligible New York City residents on how to use industry-standard software, preparing them for careers in New York's post-production facilities.
- TAP’s Made in NY Animation Training Program provides hands-on supportive training on industry-standard animation software and other career-readiness skill development to New York residents between 18 and 24 years of age.
- Made in NY Talks is a series of panel discussions and other events with working professionals, designed to inform and educate New Yorkers about career paths in the film, television, theatre, and digital media industries.

=== Fashion industry initiatives ===
- Fashion industry initiatives added in 2015 tripled the City’s investment in the local fashion economy from $5 million to $15 million. The Designers & Agents: Made in NY Collective, for example, supports the participation of local designers at trade events taking place during New York Market Week. The inaugural Made in NY Fashion campaign in 2015 featured the work of local designers in ads on 600 taxi tops, 75 buses, and many ferries, cruise vessels, billboards, and print and digital publications.
- Mayor Bill de Blasio announced plans in 2017 to create the Made in NY garment production hub and campus at the Bush Terminal in Sunset Park, Brooklyn, supporting more than 1,500 permanent jobs for garment manufacturing and film and television production.

=== Digital games initiative ===
- Made in NY Marketing Credit Program for Digital Games was added in March 2023; it provides advertising opportunities for digital games made in NYC through the Mayor’s Office of Media and Entertainment.

== Logo design ==
For the 2004 launch of the Made in NY program, Rafael Esquer, then-Creative Director at RadicalMedia, designed the Made in NY logo. Esquer’s 3 main objectives for the logo design were to create a brand that is simple, memorable, and timeless; to capture the essence, grit, and energy of New York City; and to give New Yorkers a mark that they would identify with and feel proud of. After in-depth research on the current and historical visual landscape of New York, Esquer took inspiration from urban artifacts—things imbued with everyday life and New York nostalgia, especially the subway tokens of yesteryear and manhole covers of today. Reflecting on the success of the brand in 2015, Katherine Oliver, the first Commissioner of MOFTB who hired RadicalMedia to create the Made in NY logo, said:

Still in the aftermath of 9/11, it was really appealing to create a sense of community. I wanted to create a logo to celebrate the projects and people who were producing here. To our surprise, Made in NY really struck a chord and touched people with sensitivity. There was great pride. We were very strict about who could use the seal. It created buzz in industry, but more than that, it really created that sense of community.

The Made in NY logo won the Silver Award in the Graphis Logo Design 6 competition in 2005.

== See also ==
- Media of New York City
- Mayor's Office of Film, Theatre & Broadcasting
- NYC Media
  - WNYE (FM)
  - WNYE-TV
