= Xi'an Famous Foods =

Restaurant chain in New York City

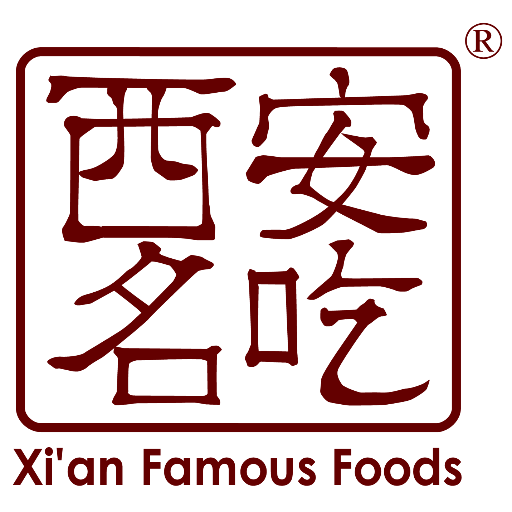

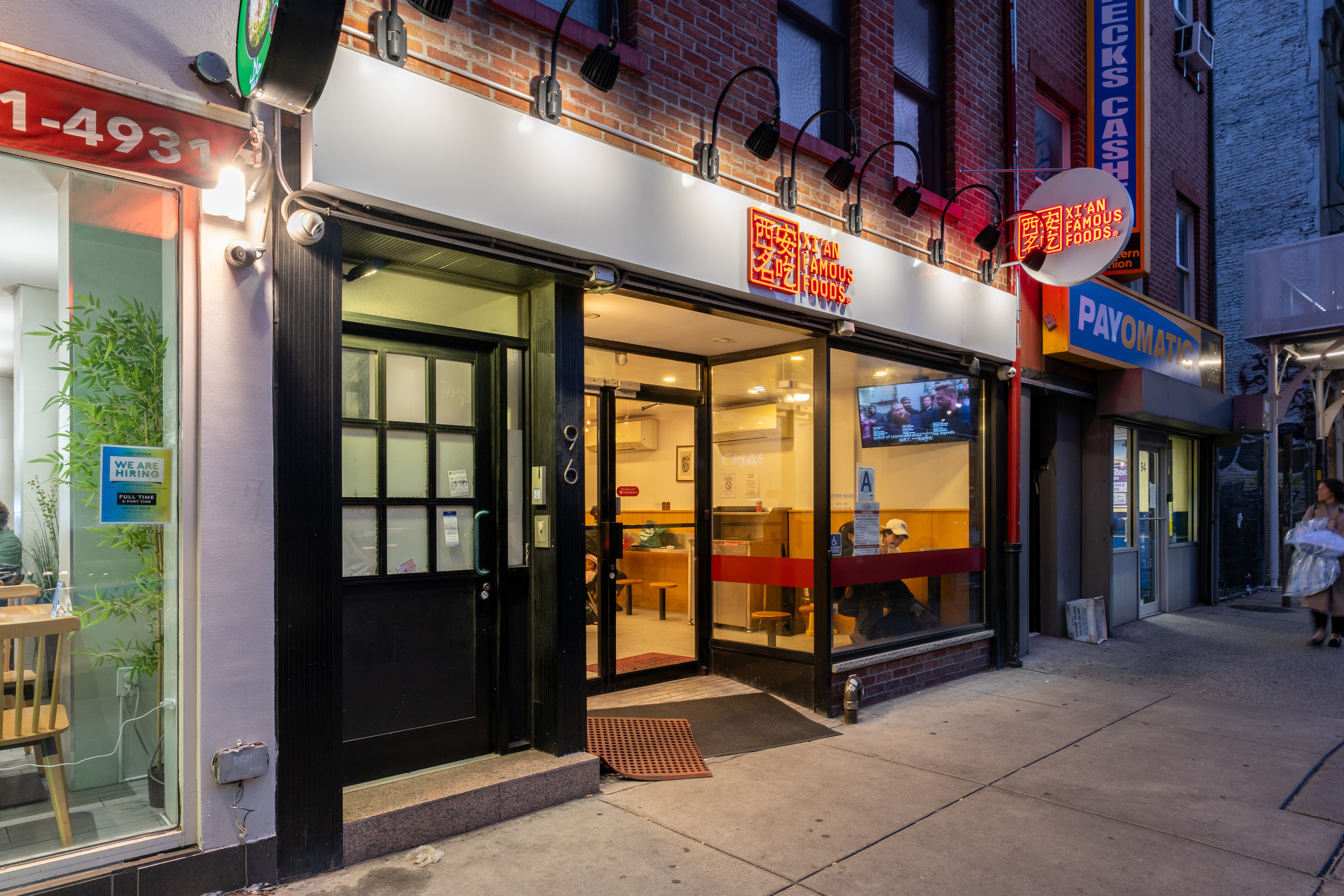
- Storefront in Chelsea, Manhattan
- Type: Private
- Industry: Restaurant
- Founded: 2005; 21 years ago in Flushing, Queens, New York, U.S.
- Founder: Jason Wang
- Headquarters: New York City, U.S.
- Number of locations: 18 (2025)
- Area served: New York City
- Products: Shaanxi-style Chinese cuisine
- Revenue: approx. $23M (2025)
- Owner: Jason Wang
- Website: www.xianfoods.com

Xi'an Famous Foods (Chinese: 西安名吃) is a chain of fast casual restaurants based in New York City that serves Shaanxi cuisine. Xi'an Famous Foods, a family-run business with no outside investors, was founded in 2005. It has been featured in television shows such as the Cooking Channel's Food(ography), Kelly Choi's Eat Out NY, and Anthony Bourdain's No Reservations. It has also appeared in The New York Times, New York Magazine, the Wall Street Journal, Forbes, and others. Xi'an Famous Foods has stores in the New York boroughs of Queens, Brooklyn, and Manhattan.

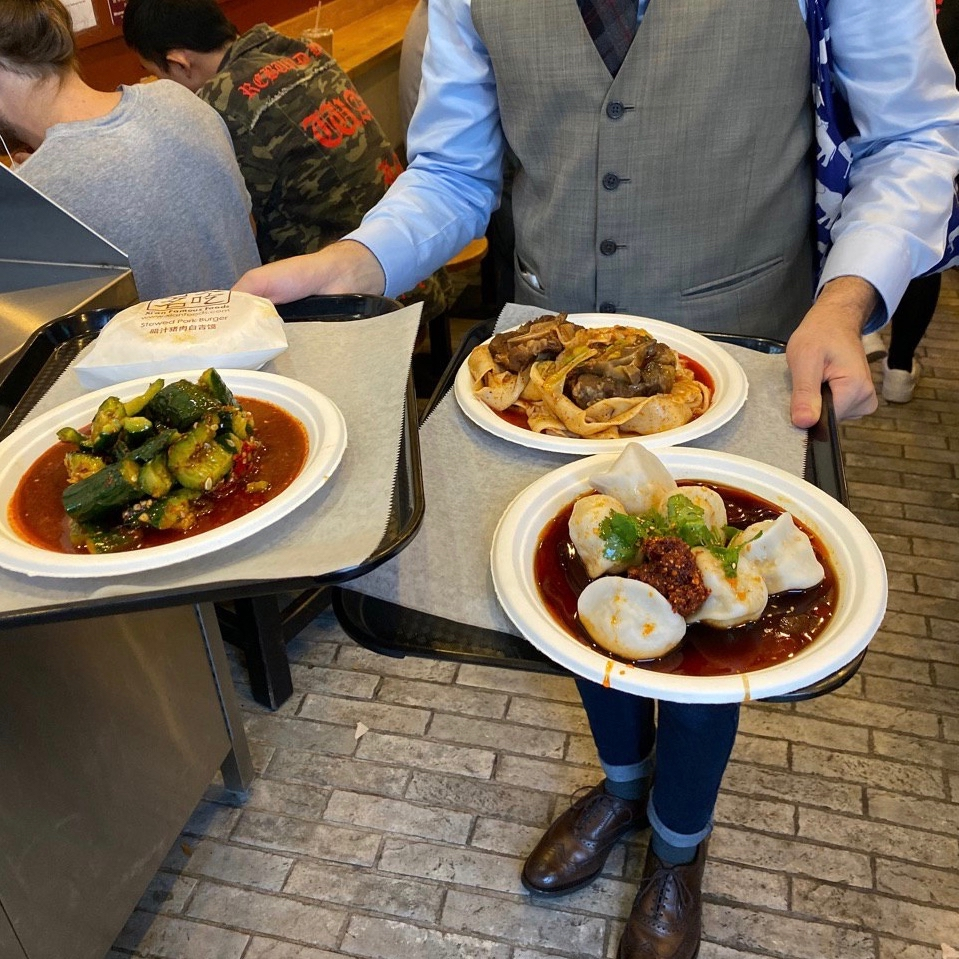
Two trays of food purchased at the Xi'an Famous Foods location on Saint Marks Place. The tray on the left holds a plate of spicy cucumber salad (front) and a stewed pork burger (rear, wrapped in waxed paper); the tray on the right holds a plate of lamb dumplings (front) and a plate of noodles with stewed oxtail (rear).

== History ==
Jason Wang serves as the company's CEO and president. He and his family come from Xi'an, Shaanxi, one of the oldest cities in China with more than 3,100 years of history. Born in Xi'an, Wang reminisces about the food that his grandfather cooked when he was young. Once Wang and his family moved to the U.S., the yearning for home flavors inspired Wang and his father to make dishes with his grandfather's secret sauce recipes. They felt that there were people like themselves who missed the cuisine of their hometown.

Before Xi'an Famous Foods existed, Jason Wang's father started a bubble tea shop, which sold food on the side, in Flushing, Queens. Meanwhile, Wang was in college at Washington University in St. Louis, but came home during breaks to help his father in the shop. They soon realized that their food sold better than their bubble tea beverages, so in late 2005, they moved their shop to the basement of Flushing's Golden Shopping Mall and called it Xi'an Famous Foods.

After Wang graduated in 2009 with a bachelor's degree in business, he worked in corporate for a short time, but then decided to focus on co-founding his family food business with his father. From that moment, Wang and his father continued expanding their food business to Manhattan and Brooklyn, opening eight more shops. Wang and his father made and sold their homemade Liang Pi Cold-Skin Noodles, Spicy Cumin Lamb Burgers, hand-ripped noodles and other specialties, offering a taste of home to their own ethnic community. "We're going to keep it pure, because that's what people are coming to us for," Wang told the New York Times.

== Operations ==
In late 2005, the original Xi'an Famous Foods opened in the basement of the Golden Mall in Flushing, Queens. In August 2009, two more shops opened, one in Flushing and one on East Broadway, but were both closed due to their limited space and facilities not conducive to the growing operations. In 2010, Xi'an Famous Foods brought their authentic Xi'an cuisine to Manhattan in the East Village on St. Marks Place. Following its success, another shop opened in Chinatown ten months later. The company continued to expand rapidly. By end of 2016, Xi'an Famous Foods had opened six more shops in Manhattan, one in Greenpoint, Brooklyn, and a sister restaurant called Biang! in the East Village which has since closed. Its Long Island City, Queens location was closed January 9, 2020, due to a fire, which had been started on the roof. Xi'an Famous Foods plans on expanding its food empire along the east coast within the next five years with the purchase of their newest 20,000 square foot building to be developed into the newest central kitchen. Xi'an Famous Foods corporate office was established in Manhattan near the Empire State building and is in place to support the operations of the restaurants and its expansion.

== Press ==
Since Xi'an Famous Foods rapid expansion in New York, the Queens restaurant chain has been picked up by many media outlets. Most recently in January 2016, Xi'an Famous Foods was named the "#2 Chinese Restaurant in the USA" by Time Out and "Breakout Brand of 2016" by Restaurant News. Following that mention, media outlets such as Business Insider and NBC Asian-American have picked up on Xi'an Famous Foods' story.

== Biang! ==
Biang! was a scion of the Xi'an Famous Foods brand, situated in a chic venue with full waiter-service. Biang!'s Full Liquor License also gave them the chance to offer a variety of Chinese Baijiu to its customers. In 2012, Biang! first opened its doors in Flushing as a proper, table-service version of their fast casual original. During its operation, Biang! received one star from The New York Times, and was also included on Michelin's Bib Gourmand list. In December 2015, the original location of Biang! closed its doors and moved to Manhattan's East Village. Opened in January 2016, the Biang! seats 40 and served all its popular skewers and noodle dishes to its customers. With Biang!'s Full Liquor License, it also offered a variety of Chinese Baijiu at the bar. It closed in March 2017.

== See also ==
- List of Chinese restaurants
