= Mass media in New York City =

New York City has been called the media capital of the world. The media organizations based in New York City are internationally influential and include some of the most important newspapers, largest publishing houses, biggest record companies, and most prolific television studios in the world. It is a major global center for the book, magazine, music, newspaper, and television industries. A 2019 Pew Research Center report found that 12 percent of all U.S. newsroom employees live in New York City, disproportionately higher than the 7 percent of the U.S. working-age population that lives in New York City.

New York is also the largest media market in North America (followed by Los Angeles, Chicago, and Toronto). Some of the city's media conglomerates include CNN (CNN Global), the Hearst Corporation, NBCUniversal, The New York Times Company, the Fox Corporation and News Corp, the Thomson Reuters Corporation, and Warner Bros. Discovery. Seven of the world's top eight global advertising agency networks are headquartered in New York. Three of the "Big Four" record labels are also headquartered or co-headquartered in the city. One-third of all American independent films are produced in New York. More than 200 newspapers and 350 consumer magazines have an office in the city and the book-publishing industry employs about 25,000 people.

Two of the three U.S. national daily newspapers with the largest circulations in the United States are published in New York: The Wall Street Journal; and The New York Times, nicknamed "the Grey Lady", which has won the most Pulitzer Prizes for journalism and is considered the U.S. media's "newspaper of record". Major tabloid newspapers in the city include the New York Daily News, which was founded in 1919 by Joseph Medill Patterson, and the New York Post, founded in 1801 by Alexander Hamilton. Newsday, a Long Island newspaper, is also widely circulated in the city. The city also has a major ethnic press, with 270 newspapers and magazines published in more than 40 languages. El Diario La Prensa is New York's largest Spanish-language daily and the oldest in the nation. The New York Amsterdam News, published in Harlem, is a prominent African-American newspaper. The Village Voice was the largest alternative newspaper until it ceased publishing in 2018.

The television industry developed in New York and is a significant employer in the city's economy. The four major American broadcast networks, ABC, CBS, Fox, and NBC, are all headquartered in New York. Many cable channels are based in the city as well, including CNN, MSNBC, MTV, Fox News, HBO, and Comedy Central. In 2005 there were more than 100 television shows taped in New York City.

New York is also a major center for non-commercial media. The oldest public-access cable television channel in the United States is the Manhattan Neighborhood Network, founded in 1971. WNET is the city's major public television station and a primary provider of national Public Broadcasting Service (PBS) programming. WNYC, a public radio station owned by the city until 1997, has the largest public radio audience in the United States. The City of New York operates a public broadcast service, NYC Media, that produces several original New York Emmy Award–winning shows covering music and culture in city neighborhoods, as well as city government-access television (GATV).

New York City is home to a number of major online media companies, including Yahoo! and its operations under the AOL brand, along with news and entertainment companies like BuzzFeed and VICE Media.

== Media industry profiles ==
=== Book publishing ===
The book publishing industry in the United States is based in New York. Publishing houses in the city range from industry giants such as Penguin Group (USA), HarperCollins, Random House, Scholastic, Simon & Schuster, and Macmillan to small niche houses like Melville House Publishing and Lee & Low Books. Three courses on publishing, the Columbia Publishing Course, the NYU Summer Publishing Institute, and the CUNY Publishing Certificate Program, train the next generation of editors. New York has also been the setting for countless works of literature, many of them produced by the city's large population of writers (which have included Paul Auster, Don DeLillo, Bret Easton Ellis, Jonathan Safran Foer, Jonathan Franzen, Jhumpa Lahiri, Jonathan Lethem, John O'Hara, Dorothy Parker, Thomas Pynchon, Susan Sontag and many others). The New York City metro area, home to the largest number of Jews and Italians outside Israel and Italy, respectively, has also been a flourishing scene for both Jewish American literature and Italian-American literature.

New York is also home to PEN America, the largest of the 141 centers of PEN International, the world's oldest human rights organization and the oldest international literary organization. PEN America plays an important role in New York's literary community and is active in defending free speech, the promotion of literature, and the fostering of international literary fellowship. Author Jennifer Egan is its current president.

Some of the most important literary journals in the United States are in New York. These include The Paris Review, The New York Review of Books, n+1, and New York Quarterly. Other New York literary publications include Circumference, Open City, The Manhattan Review, The Coffin Factory, Fence, and Telos. New York is also home to the US offices of Granta.

=== Film ===
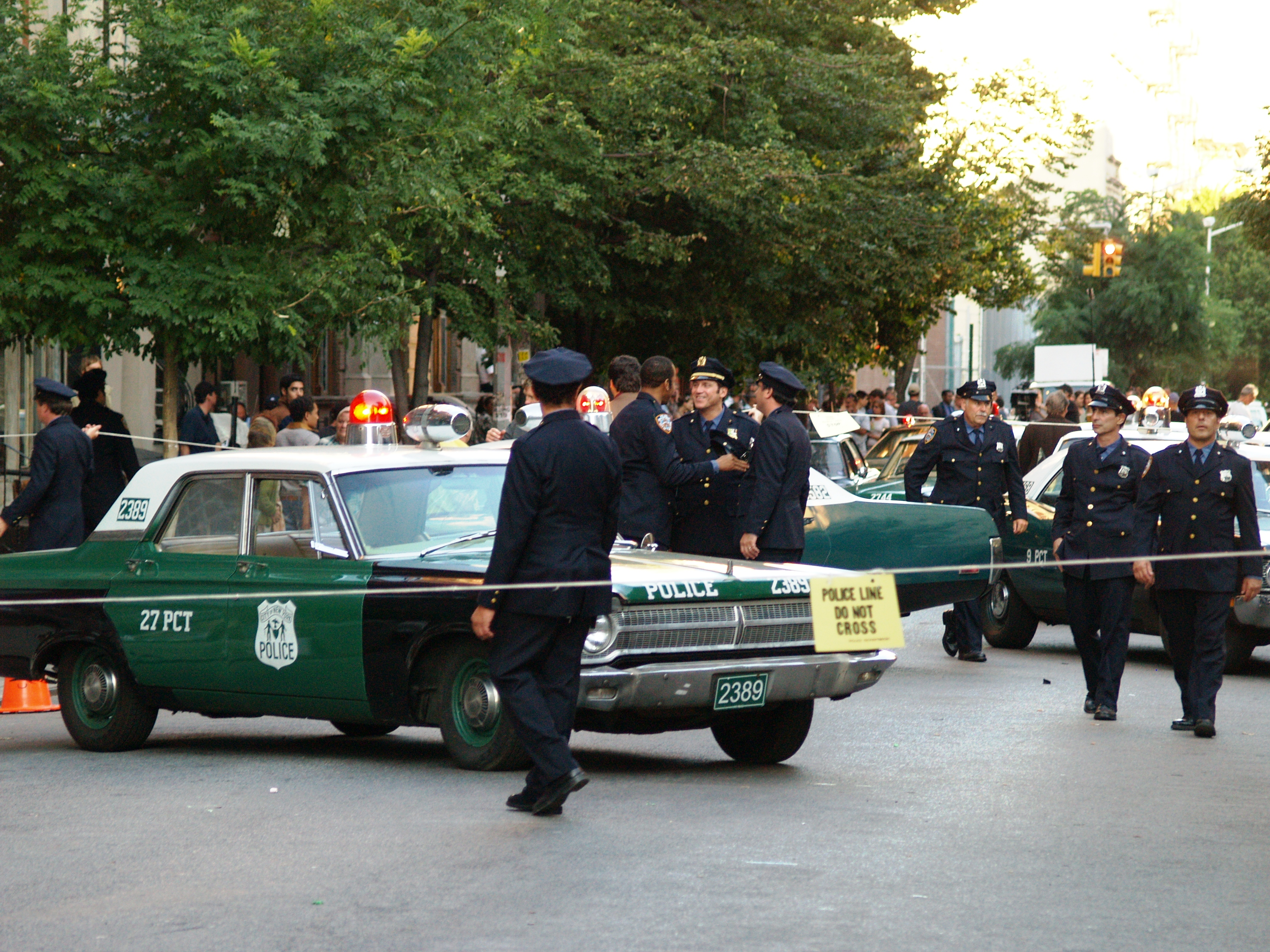
Filming a period movie in the East Village using antique police cars. New York is an accommodating filming location and frequent storyline setting.

New York is a prominent location for the American entertainment industry, with many films, television series, books, and other media being set there. As of 2012, New York City was the second largest center for filmmaking and television production in the United States, producing about 200 feature films annually, employing 130,000 individuals; the filmed entertainment industry has been growing in New York, contributing nearly US$9 billion to the New York City economy alone as of 2015, and by volume, New York is the world leader in independent film production – one-third of all American independent films are produced in New York City. The Association of Independent Commercial Producers is also based in New York. In the first five months of 2014 alone, location filming for television pilots in New York City exceeded the record production levels for all of 2013, with New York surpassing Los Angeles as the top North American city for the same distinction during the 2013/2014 cycle. International film makers are featured prominently in New York City as well.

In the earliest days of the American film industry, New York was the epicenter of filmmaking. However, the drier weather of Hollywood and tax incentives offered at the time by filming in Los Angeles made California a better choice for film production throughout much of the 20th century. The Kaufman Astoria Studios film studio, built during the silent film era, was used by the Marx Brothers and W.C. Fields, and has expanded its footprint in Queens. It has also been used for The Cosby Show, Sesame Street and the films of Woody Allen. The recently constructed Steiner Studios is a 15-acre (61,000 m^{2}) modern movie studio complex in a former shipyard where The Producers and The Inside Man, a Spike Lee movie, were filmed.

New York was also important within the animation industry, and remains so to an extent. Until 1938, it served as the home of Fleischer Studios (who produced the Popeye, Betty Boop, and Color Classics shorts for Paramount Pictures) as well as the Van Beuren Studios (who produced animated shorts for RKO Radio Pictures) until 1937. New York was later the home for Famous Studios (who replaced Fleischer Studios and continued the production of Popeye shorts for Paramount) from 1943 to the 1960s. Its current position in the animation world is as an alternative to Los Angeles (where most U.S. animation is produced. The city now houses several schools and school programs concerning animation, and is a source of work for animators working for any medium, from advertising to film.

Silvercup Studios has expanded in Long Island City, Queens with numerous soundstages, production and studio support space, offices for media and entertainment companies, stores, 1,000 apartments in high-rise towers, a catering hall and a cultural institution, built at the edge of the East River in Queens, overlooking Manhattan, and maintaining its status as the largest production house on the U.S. East Coast. Steiner Studios in Brooklyn still has the largest individual soundstage, however. Miramax Films, a Big Ten film studio, was the largest motion picture distribution and production company headquartered in the city until it moved to Burbank, California in January 2010. Many smaller independent producers and distributors are located in New York.

==== Film-related lists ====
- List of film festivals in New York City
- List of New York City television and film studios

=== Magazines ===
New York City has a long history in American magazine publishing based in New York City.

- Billboard
- Bloomberg Businessweek
- Brooklyn Magazine
- The Brooklyn Rail
- City Limits
- Cosmopolitan
- Entertainment Weekly
- GO NYC
- Harper's Bazaar
- The L Magazine
- L'Idea
- Manhattan, inc. (defunct)
- New York
- The New Yorker
- Next Magazine
- Rolling Stone
- Seventeen
- The Real Deal
- Time Out NY
- Time
- Vogue

=== Music ===
In the 1930s, New York-based RCA was the nation's largest manufacturer of phonographs. In the late 19th and early 20th century, most sheet music in the United States—especially the popular songs of the day, many now standards—was printed at Tin Pan Alley, so called because the constant sound of new songs being tried out on pianos in the publishing houses was said to sound like a tin pan. By the early 1960s the radio and musical stars of the Golden Age of Broadway gave way to the Brill Building's "Brill Sound".

Salsa music, which got its start in New York City in the mid-1960s, was popularized by the New York record label Fania Records, which developed a highly polished "Fania sound" that came to be synonymous with salsa.

In the 1980s and 1990s, hip hop labels including Def Jam, Roc-A-Fella and Bad Boy Records were founded in New York, creating what is known as East Coast hip hop. These labels continue to be among the largest hip-hop labels in the world. Other influential New York-based hip hop labels, past and present, include Cold Chillin' Records, Jive Records, Loud Records, Rawkus Records and Tommy Boy Records.

Two of the "Big Four" music labels are headquartered in the city: Sony Music Entertainment and Warner Music Group. The world headquarters of MTV is also in New York.

Many major music magazines are headquartered in the city as well, including Blender Magazine, Punk Magazine, Spin and Rolling Stone.

=== Newspapers ===
New York City is home to 4 of the 10 largest papers in the United States. These include The New York Times (circulation 571,500), the New York Post (circulation 414,254), and the Daily News (circulation 227,352). The Wall Street Journal (circulation 2.2 million), published in New York City, is a national-scope business newspaper and the first or second most-read newspaper in the nation, depending on measurement method.

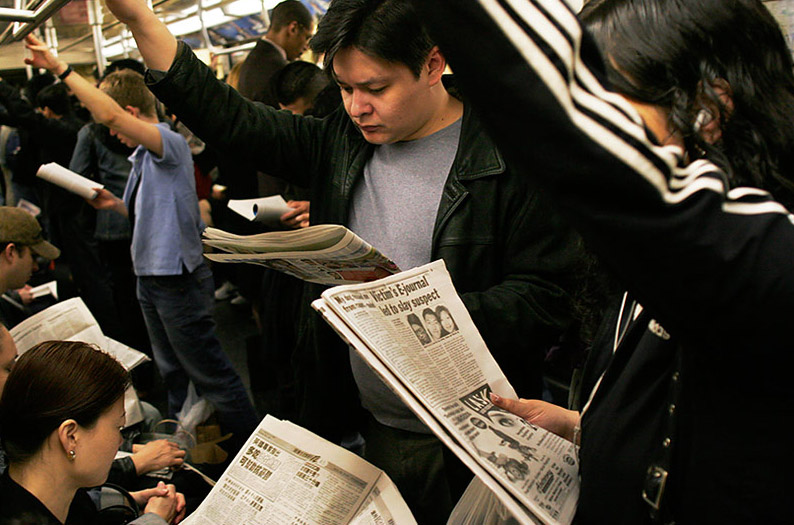
Straphangers use newspapers on New York's mass transit system.

El Diario La Prensa (circulation 265,000) is New York's largest Spanish-language daily and the oldest in the nation. There are also several borough-specific newspapers, such as The Brooklyn Daily Eagle and The Staten Island Advance. Free daily newspapers mainly distributed to commuters include amNewYork, Hoy and Metro New York. In addition to the print newspapers, BKLYNER is the leading daily digital news publication reporting on local news and events in Brooklyn.

The city's ethnic press is large and diverse. Major ethnic publications include the Roman Catholic diocesan paper for Brooklyn-Queens, The Tablet and Jewish-American newspapers The Jewish Daily Forward (פֿאָרװערטס; Forverts, published in Yiddish and English) (founded in 1897), and African-American newspapers, including the long-time newspaper The New York Amsterdam News (founded in 1909) and Brooklyn-based Our Time Press. The Epoch Times, an international newspaper published by the Falun Gong, has English and Chinese editions in New York. There are seven dailies published in Chinese and four in Spanish. Multiple daily papers are published in Italian, Greek, Polish, and Korean, and other weekly newspapers serve dozens of different ethnic communities, with ten separate newspapers focusing on the African-American community alone. Many nationally distributed ethnic newspapers are based in Astoria, Chinatown or Brooklyn. Over 60 ethnic groups, writing in 42 languages, publishing over 200 non-English language magazines and newspapers in New York City, including newspapers in 95 non-English languages and local radio broadcasts in over 30 languages.

Ethnic variation is not the only measure of the diversity of New York City's newspapers, with editorial opinions running from left-leaning at alternative papers like the Village Voice (before its closure in 2018), to conservative at the New York Post. New York Observer covers politics and the city's rich and powerful with unusual depth. The tradition of a free press owes much to John Peter Zenger, a New York publisher who was acquitted in his 1735 landmark court case, setting the precedent that truth was a legitimate defense against accusations of libel.

Major newspapers emphasizing coverage of the New York metropolitan region outside the city include Newsday, which covers primarily Long Island but also New York City, (especially Brooklyn and Queens), The Journal News, which covers Westchester County, to the north along the Hudson River and The Bergen Record and The Star-Ledger, of Newark which cover northern New Jersey across the New York Bay and Hudson River to the west.

=== Digital media ===
New York City's digital media ecosystem, sometimes described as "Silicon Media Allley", include both software companies and companies known primarily as content producers. Among the former are Tumblr (now owned by Automattic), Foursquare, and AOL. Among the latter are G/O Media, BuzzFeed (which, since 2020, owns HuffPost) and Weblogs, Inc., which is currently part of Yahoo. The satirical newspaper The Onion (online-only from 2013 to 2024) was based in New York from 2000 to 2012.

=== Broadcast radio ===
==== AM stations ====
- 570 WMCA New York City (Christian)
- 620 WSNR Jersey City, NJ (Russian/variety)
- 660 WFAN New York City (Sports)^{1}
- 710 WOR New York City (Conservative talk)^{1}
- 770 WABC New York City (Conservative talk)^{1}
- 820 WNYC New York City (NPR/talk)^{†}
- 880 WHSQ New York City (Sports)^{1}
- 930 WPAT Paterson, NJ (Brokered/ethnic)
- 970 WNYM Hackensack, NJ (Conservative talk)
- 1010 WINS New York City (All-news)
- 1050 WEPN New York City (Sports)
- 1100 WHLI Hempstead (Oldies)^{2}
- 1130 WBBR New York City (Bloomberg Radio)^{1}
- 1160 WVNJ Oakland, NJ (Relevant Radio)^{†}
- 1190 WLIB New York City (Gospel)
- 1240 WGBB Freeport (Multilingual brokered)
- 1280 WADO New York City (Spanish sports)
- 1330 WWRV New York City (Spanish Christian music, and teaching)
- 1380 WKDM New York City (Mandarin/Spanish)
- 1430 WNSW Newark, NJ (Relevant Radio)^{†}
- 1460 WVOX New Rochelle (Brokered/Music of Your Life)
- 1480 WZRC New York City (Cantonese)
- 1530 WJDM Mineola (Spanish Christian)^{2}
- 1560 WFME New York City (Family Radio)^{1†}
- 1600 WWRL New York City (Black Information Network)
- 1660 WWRU Jersey City, NJ (Korean)
- 1710 WQFG689 Jersey City, NJ (Hudson County, NJ) (Travelers' information station)

^{1} clear-channel station
^{2} daytime-only station
^{3} station broadcasting in all-digital
^{†} non-commercial station

==== FM stations ====
Asterisk (*) indicates a non-commercial (public radio/campus/educational) broadcast.
([RDS]) — indicates a supported by the Radio Data System.

- 88.1 WCWP Brookville (College/variety)*
- 88.3 WBGO Newark, NJ (NPR/jazz)*
- 88.7 WRHU Hempstead (College/variety)*
- 88.9 WSIA Staten Island (College/alternative rock)*
- 89.1 WNYU-FM New York City (College/variety)*
- 89.5 WSOU South Orange, NJ (College/rock)*
- 89.9 WKCR-FM New York City (College/variety)*
- 90.3 WKRB Brooklyn (College/CHR)*
- 90.7 WFUV New York City (NPR/AAA)*
- 91.1 WFMU Jersey City, NJ (College/freeform)*
- 91.5 WNYE New York City (NPR/variety)*
- 92.3 WINS-FM New York City (All-news) [RDS]
- 92.7 WFME-FM Garden City (Family Radio)*
- 93.1 WPAT-FM Paterson, NJ (Bachata/reggaetón/tropical)
- 93.5 WVIP New Rochelle (Caribbean)
- 93.9 WNYC-FM New York City (NPR/talk)* [RDS]
- 94.7 WXBK Newark, NJ (Classic Hip Hop) [RDS]
- 95.5 WPLJ New York City (K-Love)*
- 96.3 WXNY-FM New York City (Spanish rhythmic AC)
- 96.7 WARW Port Chester (Air1)*
- 97.1 WQHT New York City (Mainstream urban) [RDS]
- 97.9 WSKQ-FM New York City (Tropical music)
- 98.3 WKJY Hempstead (Adult contemporary) [RDS]
- 98.7 WEPN-FM New York City (Spanish AC) [RDS]
- 99.5 WBAI New York City (Pacifica Radio)*
- 100.3 WHTZ Newark, NJ (Contemporary hit radio)
- 100.7 WHUD Peekskill (Adult contemporary)
- 101.1 WCBS-FM New York City (Classic hits) [RDS]
- 101.9 WFAN-FM New York City (Sports) [RDS]
- 102.7 WNEW-FM New York City (Hot adult contemporary) [RDS]
- 103.5 WKTU Lake Success (Rhythmic AC)
- 103.9 WVBN Bronxville (Christian)
- 104.3 WAXQ New York City (Classic rock)
- 105.1 WWPR-FM New York City (Mainstream urban)
- 105.5 WDHA-FM Dover, NJ (Mainstream rock) [RDS]
- 105.9 WQXR-FM Newark, NJ (Classical)*
- 106.3 WHCY-FM Blairstown, NJ (Country) [RDS]
- 106.7 WLTW New York City (Adult contemporary)
- 107.1 WXPK Briarcliff Manor (AAA)
- 107.5 WBLS New York City (Urban AC) [RDS]

==== Defunct stations ====
- 2XG–WJX/New York City (1915–17, 1920–24)
- W2XEA–KE2XCC/Alpine, NJ (1945–54)
- W2XMN/Alpine, NJ (1936–49)
- W31NY–WFMN/Alpine, NJ (1941–53)
- WDT/New York City (1921–23)
- WDY/Roselle Park, NJ (1921–22)
- WJDM/Elizabeth, NJ (1970–2019)
- WGYN/New York City (1941–50)
- WJY/Hoboken, NJ (July 2, 1921)
- WJY/New York City (1923–27; merged into WJZ, now WABC)
- W63NY–WHNF–WMGM-FM/New York City (1942–55)
- WBBR–WPOW/New York City (1924–84; merged into WNYM, now WWRV)
- WNNJ–WPAT-FM/Paterson, NJ (1949–1951)
- WRNY/New York City (1928–34; merged into WHN, now WEPN)
- WWDX/Paterson, New Jersey (1947–49)

=== Television ===
New York City is the home of the three traditional major American television networks, ABC, CBS and NBC, as well as Spanish-language networks Univision and Telemundo. They each have local broadcast owned and operated stations which serve as the flagship stations of their networks.

The NBC affiliate is simulcast in Puerto Rico on channel 2.3. The CW affiliate WPIX is a superstation carried by cable providers in Canada and the Lesser Antilles.

It is also the headquarters of several of the largest cable television channels, including MTV, Fox News, HBO, and Comedy Central. Silvercup Studios, located in Queens was the production facility for the popular television shows Sex and the City and The Sopranos. MTV and later CBS broadcast programming live from a sound stage overlooking Times Square, several blocks away from The Ed Sullivan Theater, the theater housing the Late Show with Stephen Colbert. Saturday Night Live is broadcast from NBC's studios at 30 Rockefeller Center, where The Tonight Show Starring Jimmy Fallon, Late Night with Seth Meyers, NBC Nightly News and The Today Show is also taped. African American-aimed BET is headquartered on 57th Street. The Colbert Report is produced by Comedy Central on 54th Street, and The Daily Show, also produced by Comedy Central, is produced just a few blocks over on 11th avenue and West 53rd street. Glenn Beck's The Blaze TV has a studio in Manhattan. Over a thousand people are involved with producing the various Law & Order television series. In 2005 there were more than 100 new and returning television shows taped in New York City, according to the Mayor's Office of Film, Theater and Broadcasting.

WNET, New York's largest public television station, is a primary national provider of PBS programming. The oldest public-access television network in the United States is the Manhattan Neighborhood Network, well known for its eclectic local origination programming that ranges from a jazz hour to discussion of labor issues to foreign-language and religious programming. There are eight other Public-access television channels in New York, including Brooklyn Community Access Television (BCAT). As part of use of local rights-of-way, the cable operators in New York have granted Public, educational, and government access (PEG) organizations channels for programming. They also carry the New York State legislative channel available on cable packages with sufficient bandwidth.

City authorities awarded the first cable television territorial franchises in Manhattan and parts of The Bronx, and to the other boroughs in 1983. As of 2026, the franchises are held by Optimum Communications, Spectrum and Verizon.

Charter's predecessor Time Warner Cable launched news channel NY1 in 1992. The NY1 is known for its beat coverage of city neighborhoods, and its coverage of City Hall and state politics is closely watched by political insiders.

For years, several soap operas were filmed in the New York City area, including Another World, As the World Turns, Guiding Light, All My Children and One Life to Live. As of 2012, there are no New York soap operas left on the air.

==== Broadcast ====
Asterisk (*) indicates channel is a network owned-and-operated station. Two asterisks (**) indicates channel is a network flagship station.

- 2 WCBS New York City (CBS)**
- 4 WNBC New York City (NBC)**
- 5 WNYW New York City (Fox)**
- 7 WABC New York City (ABC)**
- 9 WWOR Secaucus, NJ (MyNetworkTV)**
- 11 WPIX New York City (The CW)**
- 13 WNET Newark, NJ (PBS)**
- 14 WNDT-CD New York City (FNX)
- 21 WLIW Garden City (PBS)
- 25 WNYE New York City (Non-commercial independent)
- 31 WPXN New York City (Ion Television)*
- 33 WJLP Middletown Township, NJ (MeTV)*
- 41 WXTV Paterson, NJ (Univision)**
- 46 WMBQ-CD New York City (FNX)
- 47 WNJU Linden, NJ (Telemundo)**
- 48 WRNN New Rochelle (ShopHQ)
- 49 WEDW Stamford, CT (PBS)
- 50 WNJN Montclair, NJ (PBS)
- 54 WTBY Jersey City, NJ (TBN)*
- 55 WLNY Riverhead (Independent)
- 63 WMBC Newton, NJ (Estrella TV)
- 68 WFUT Newark, NJ (UniMás)*

==== Defunct stations ====
- KC2XAK/Bridgeport, CT (1949–52)
- W26CE/New York City (1984–2021)
- WMUN-CD/New York City (1988–2017)
- WRTV/Asbury Park, NJ (1954–55)
- WNYJ-TV/West Milford, NJ (1996–2017)
- WWPS-LP/Kinnelon, NJ (1991–2016)

==== Cable and internet ====
- CBS News New York
- CUNY TV
- NY1
- News12
- MSG Network
- MSG Sportsnet
- SportsNet New York
- YES Network

== Portrayals of New York City in the media ==
Due to the size and cultural impact of New York City, this metropolis has frequently found itself at the center of numerous portrayals across various forms of mass media. These depictions are often rich in diversity and contrast, highlighting an array of perspectives that capture the city's complexity in ways that can appear conflicting. With its unmatched blend of bustling urban life, iconic landmarks, and eclectic neighborhoods, New York City serves as a frequent backdrop for filmmakers, writers, and artists alike. They are inspired to explore its multifaceted nature, crafting stories that range from romanticized visions to gritty realism, thereby reflecting the city's ever-evolving character from different angles and viewpoints.

In the early years of film New York City was characterized as urbane and sophisticated. By the city's crisis period in the 1970s, however, films like Midnight Cowboy (1969), The French Connection (1971), and Death Wish (1974) showed New York as full of chaos and violence. With the city's renaissance in the 1990s came new portrayals on television; Seinfeld, Friends, and Sex and the City showed life in the city to be glamorous and interesting. Nonetheless, a disproportionate number of crime dramas, such as Law & Order and the Spider-Man film series, continue to use the city as their setting despite New York's status as the safest large city in the United States after plummeting crime rates over many years.

An essay appearing in the Arts section of The New York Times in April 2006 quoted several filmmakers, including Sidney Lumet and Paul Mazursky, describing how modern cinema shows the city as far more "teeming, terrifying, exhilarating, [and] unforgiving" than contemporary New York actually is, and the consequential challenge this poses for filmmakers. The article quotes Robert Greenhut, Woody Allen's producer, as saying that despite the increased sanitization of modern New York, "New Yorkers' personalities are different to Chicago. There's a certain kind of vibrancy and tone that you can't get elsewhere. The labor pool is more interesting than elsewhere — the salesgirl with one line, or the cop. That's who directors are looking for."

=== Media-related lists ===
- List of books set in New York City
- List of films set in New York City
- List of journalists in New York City
- List of television shows set in New York City
- List of video games set in New York City

== See also ==
- Culture of New York City
- List of New York City newspapers and magazines
- Made in NY
- Media in the United States
- New Yorkers in journalism
- NYC Media Group
