= Eat Out NY =

Eat Out NY is a local television series that explores New York City's restaurants. The program runs in the New York City area on WNYE-TV (channel 25) and on WNBC (channel 4). Hosted and produced by former Ford model Kelly Choi, the show has become a top performer on NYC TV and is widely regarded, along with Secrets of New York, as the channel's signature series.

Eat Out NY began as a collaboration with local New York lifestyle magazine Time Out NY. The series joins Cool in Your Code and New York 360*, as the signature lifestyle programs on NYC TV. In the process, Choi has become a local celebrity. In 2006, the Bravo television network briefly entertained the notion of hiring Choi to host Top Chef, replacing Padma Lakshmi, the former wife of writer Salman Rushdie. Industry insiders expect Choi to land a hosting job on the Food Network in 2008 where she has been under heavy consideration since 2006.

In the summer of 2009, Bravo unveiled Top Chef Masters, which stares Choi as the host.
