= Katherine Oliver =

American media and entertainment executive

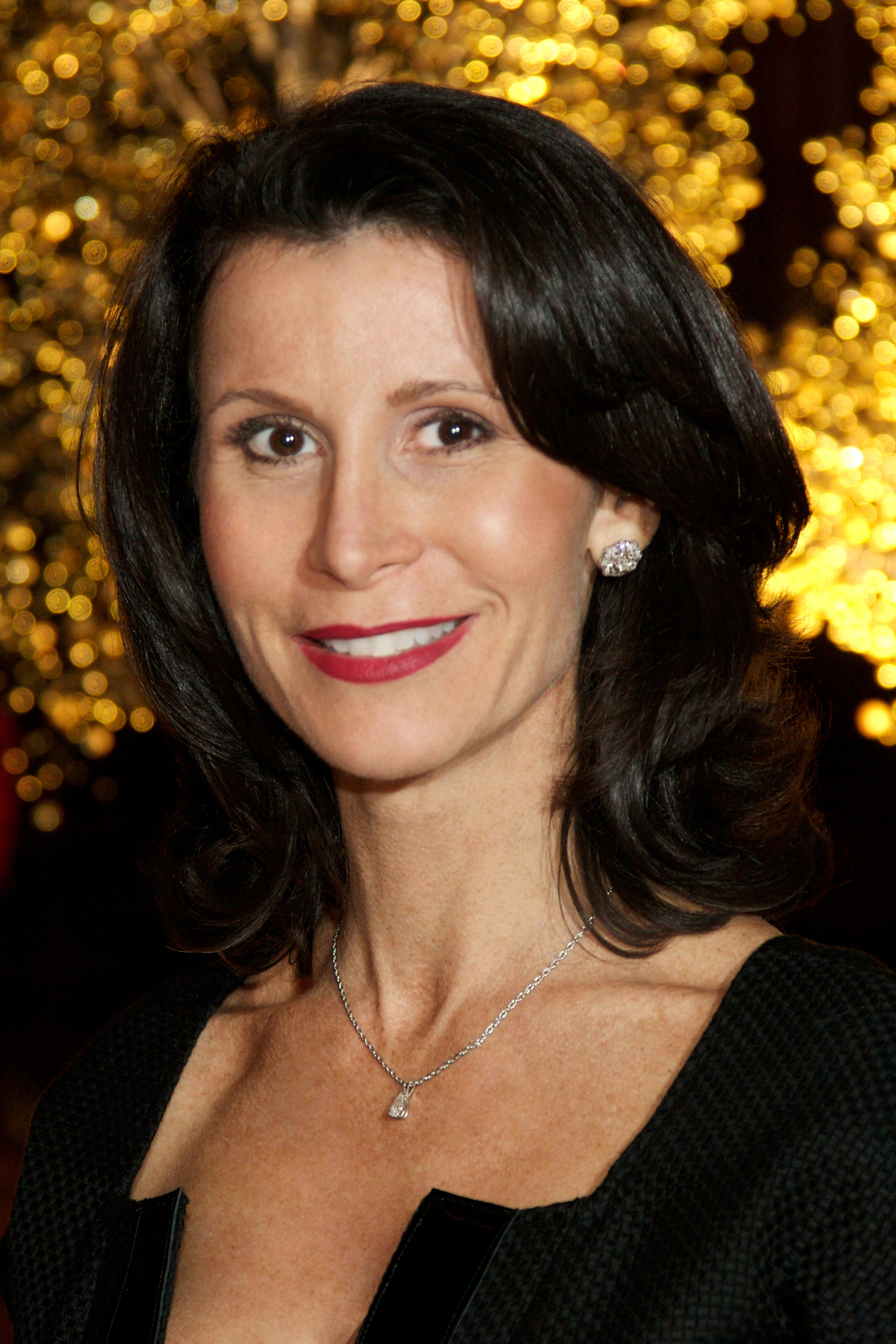
- Born: New York City, US
- Occupations: Media and entertainment executive
- Title: Principal, Bloomberg Associates

Katherine Oliver is an American media and entertainment executive based in New York City. She is a principal at Bloomberg Associates, a philanthropic consultancy firm founded by Michael Bloomberg to provide advice and long-term solutions to cities worldwide. She also oversees film, television and digital media projects for Bloomberg Philanthropies, the charitable foundation of former New York City Mayor Michael Bloomberg.

On August 1, 2002, Oliver was appointed by New York City Mayor Michael Bloomberg as the commissioner of the New York City Mayor's Office of Film, Theatre and Broadcasting, which facilitates all aspects of film, television and commercial production in New York City, coordinating on-location filming, liaising with the community and promoting the city as an entertainment capital. Oliver was the main liaison between the Mayor's Office and Hollywood, and aimed "to make filmmakers and production companies happy to return to New York."

In 2013, Oliver and Mayor Bloomberg were featured on the cover of Variety and were credited for their role in "revitalizing the city's entertainment sector." AM New York noted, "New York's film and TV industry is stronger than it has ever been, pumping $7.1 billion into the local economy in 2011 and bringing in some $60 billion over the last decade." After Bloomberg announced that former president and co-founder of NYC Media Group Arick Wierson was returning to the private sector, Bloomberg named Oliver as the incoming president of NYC Media and general manager of NYC Media. In July 2010, Oliver became the commissioner of the Mayor's Office of Media and Entertainment, the city agency that includes the Mayor's Office of Film, Theatre and Broadcasting, NYC Media, and NYC Digital.

== New York City's entertainment industry ==
Production levels increased dramatically since Oliver's appointment as film commissioner. Between 2002 and 2011, television production in New York City grew by 82%, while the number of primetime episodic dramas based in the city increased from only nine series in the 2001–2002 TV season to 25 series in 2012–2013. In 2012, TV drama production in New York City increased by 37%, while it decreased in Los Angeles by 20%. The growth in production was also a boost to the local economy, with on-location filming bringing money into the local economy and attracting tourists who are inspired to visit the settings of the shows they see on screen.

At the start of her appointment as commissioner in 2002, Oliver updated the way permits were issued, doing away with electric typewriters and reducing permit process wait times. In later years, an online permit system was developed, allowing any production with Internet access to apply for location requests, eliminating the need to visit the office in person to obtain permits. Oliver also emphasized customer service and implemented measures that would make it more cost effective to film in New York City, like the "Made in NY" Marketing Credit – free advertising in subways, buses and on Taxi-TV for qualified productions in exchange for a donation made to a local cultural institution – and a discount program lessening the cost of goods and services for films and TV shows in the city at 1,000 participating businesses.

Filmmakers responded to the open access and additional services. According to HBO executive Bruce Richmond, "Location shoots, especially in a city the scale of New York, have their complexities, so you always want an engaged mayor's office. That's exactly what we've seen with Mayor Bloomberg's team."

In a 2013 Fast Company article, Oliver was described as "rejuvenat[ing] an entire industry, helping to grow New York's content economy."

== Marketing, education, and workforce development ==
To distinguish productions that filmed at least 75 percent of their projects in New York City, Oliver teamed up with @radical.media, a NYC-based media company, to create the "Made in NY" logo. "It kind of looks like an old New York City subway token, and we thought this is our mark of distinction, and every project that qualifies will display it proudly. It really led to a grassroots initiative where people in the industry were kind of vying for this status." In 2013, the "Made in NY" logo was expanded to also include digital companies and startups that had at least 75 percent of their development based in New York City.

Throughout Oliver's time as commissioner of the Mayor's Office of Film, Theatre and Broadcasting, and later the Mayor's Office of Media and Entertainment, the agency developed a number of programs to help New Yorkers gain access into the entertainment industry, including a free series of career panels and the "Made in NY" Production Assistant Training Program, which, with the nonprofit Brooklyn Workforce Innovations, prepares unemployed and underemployed New Yorkers for entry-level jobs on sets and in production offices. As of 2012, approximately 96 percent of the program graduates were people of color, and "Made in NY" PAs had worked on over 2,000 productions.

Oliver also championed educational initiatives and assisted the next generation of filmmakers to develop their talents. In collaboration with the Department of Education and Tribeca Film Institute, Oliver and her team developed the Blueprint for Teaching and Learning in the Arts: The Moving Image, a guide that outlined expectations for the study of film, TV and animation from early elementary school through high school graduation. A scholarship fund was established for students attending New York City College of Technology and pursuing a baccalaureate degree in the entertainment technology field; the fund was made possible through a donation from Teamsters Local 817 in support of the Office of Film, Theatre and Broadcasting. In 2012, it was announced that the Mayor's Office of Media and Entertainment would invest in the new Brooklyn College Graduate School of Cinema at Steiner Studios. "We have an obligation as an economic development agency to train and retain people of the industry," said Oliver. Tuition was expected to cost less than half that of most graduate film programs in the U.S.

== Digital communication and the city's media channels ==
In 2011, with the rise of social media and the shift to digital content creation, Oliver established New York City's first digital media office, NYC Digital, and named Rachel Haot as the city's chief digital officer. Oliver tasked NYC Digital with streamlining digital communication across city agencies; strengthening partnerships with the city's technology and digital media industries; and creating the Roadmap for the Digital City, an overview of all of New York City's current and forthcoming digital initiatives. The report demonstrated the strides the city had made to date, driven by a vibrant technology industry, a strong social media presence, infrastructure improvements and historic investments in education. By the fall of 2013, all 40 initiatives in report had been completed, including connecting more New Yorkers to free Wi-Fi in public spaces, increasing the city's digital reach through social media and online communications and supporting the city's digital sector.

In 2008, Oliver and the Mayor's Office of Film, Theatre and Broadcasting helped launch Internet Week New York with the International Academy of Digital Arts and Sciences. The annual festival of events highlighted New York City's Internet and digital industries, bringing together companies, organizations and innovators to discuss the future of digital media.

During Oliver's time overseeing NYC Media – the network of television stations, radio station and online video player operated by the City of New York – it produced Emmy Award-winning content and new seasons of $9.99 and Secrets of New York. NYC Media's video-on-demand player, which includes an extensive collection of short form, episodic programming and special presentations focused on service, culture, food, history and other New York City-centric content, is available online and via the NYC Media app, which was launched in 2011. Content from the player is watched by nearly 800,000 users per month. The app also allows users to receive notifications in order to watch live mayoral press conferences.

== "Made in NY" Media Center ==
To foster creativity and collaboration between filmmakers and digital companies, Oliver and her team established the "Made in NY" Media Center. "We were also watching the trends of the entertainment and media industries, and it became clear that New York City was quickly becoming home to numerous startups and digital companies," said Oliver. The center provides affordable workspace and offer education courses, workshops and networking events and connects production companies with local startups. Operated by IFP and located in DUMBO, Brooklyn, the ribbon was cut at the Center on October 1, 2013.

== Bloomberg Technology Summit ==
Oliver helped launch the Bloomberg Technology Summit series in October 2012. The summits are designed to bring technology and government leaders together to address the challenges and opportunities of growing a local tech sector with a focus on education, infrastructure, growing and retaining local talent and marketing. The first summit in 2012, and the second summit in 2013, were hosted in New York City, with the second being co-hosted by San Francisco Mayor Ed Lee. The third edition took place in the summer of 2014 in London in collaboration with Mayor Boris Johnson. The summit coincided with the release of new research showing that London's tech sector is growing at a faster rate than that of Silicon Valley.

Attendees at the summit have included Eric Schmidt, Dick Costolo, Tim Armstrong, and Boris Johnson.

At the second Bloomberg Technology Summit, Mayor Bloomberg released a report titled “Building a Digital City” that found there were 262,000 jobs and $30 billion in annual wages in New York City's tech sector, making it the second largest contributor to the city's economy. The report found that the growth in New York City's tech sector helped the city exit the recession faster than the rest of the country.

== Bloomberg L.P. ==
Prior to her appointment as commissioner, Oliver was the general manager of Bloomberg Television and Radio, reporting directly to Michael Bloomberg. She was responsible for expanding the Bloomberg brand through the creation of global television and radio services. She launched and managed nine international business TV channels and five radio services in multiple languages worldwide. She hired, trained and managed a staff of 650 in 25 cities, and established sales, marketing and distribution teams in Europe, Asia and Latin America as well as North America. Oliver also worked as a radio and television reporter and anchor at Bloomberg, CNBC, FNN and WBGO Radio.

Oliver hosts a weekly "Bloomberg Arts & Entertainment" radio segment on Bloomberg Radio on Wednesdays during Bloomberg Advantage. Past guests have included Scandal actress Bellamy Young, Fandor CEO Ted Hope, House of Cards writer Beau Willimon, screenwriter James Schamus, and documentary filmmaker Joe Berlinger. Oliver has also hosted a series of panel discussions at Bloomberg L.P. In October 2014, Oliver hosted two panels. The first, with the Tribeca Film Festival, brought together industry leaders to discuss how digital media is transformation content. The second panel featured media executives for a discussion on the future of the entertainment industry.

== Bloomberg Associates ==
After Mayor Bloomberg's term ended in 2013, Oliver joined Bloomberg Associates as the principal of Media and Tech Strategies. Bloomberg Associates works with cities domestically and internationally, free of charge, to help solve long-term problems and urban challenges. Her practice helps cities manage the challenges and opportunities presented by the role media and technology play in delivering economic opportunities.

At Bloomberg Associates, Oliver has worked with Athens, Greece, as it emerges from an eight-year financial crisis to become a "city that uses technology to improve the lives of its people by making things easier, faster and more reliable." The initiative to help Athens become a smart city is supported at no cost by Bloomberg Associates.

Oliver also oversees Bloomberg Philanthropies' support for film, TV and digital projects. In this capacity, she served as executive producer for the 2017 National Geographic documentary From the Ashes, produced by Bloomberg Philanthropies and Radical Media.

Speaking of that film and more broadly on the use of documentaries by Bloomberg Philanthropies to inform the public on important issues, Oliver said:

"The goal is to equip people with real facts so they can have intelligent conversations and approach their local officials to continue this dialogue. I think that's what we look at internally whether it be in education, environment or arts and culture. We're trying to now explore how do we use film to engage some other audiences, influence and also try to prompt change."

Oliver is executive producer of the 2018 documentary From Paris to Pittsburgh, also produced by Bloomberg Philanthropies and Radical Media and distributed by National Geographic. The film is a "searing look at the effects of climate change" from the perspective of regular people dealing with it in their local communities.

Oliver said the film shows that the threat of climate change is serious, but also reflects "hope in how Americans are working toward a sustainable future."

== Women's leadership ==
Under Oliver's leadership, New York City's Digital Office launched Women in Tech NYC to help connect female students with STEM fields. In the fall of 2013, more than 200 female students from 14 public schools met with numerous tech companies across New York City. Oliver has spoken about the importance of getting female role models in technology and media into popular culture.

== Memberships, academia, and honors ==
Oliver serves on the board of directors of 1-800-Flowers and The Chef's Warehouse. She serves on a number of not-for-profit boards, including those of the Ghetto Film school, the Center for Communications, the Paley Center for Media, as well as the Academy Museum of Motion Pictures.

Oliver served as a member of the Tony Awards Nominating Committee. Oliver also taught a journalism course at New York University as well as in Columbia University's School of International and Public Affairs graduate program.

For her contributions to the entertainment industry, Oliver has been recognized with the National Academy of TV Arts & Sciences Leadership Award (2005), the Matrix Award (2006), the Nielsen Impact Award (2008), the John A. Reisenbach Foundation Distinguished Citizenship Award (2008), the NYC College of Technology Foundation Best of NY Award (2009) and by the Brooklyn Chamber of Commerce (2012) as a leader in New York City's television industry. She has also been honored as a Lighthouse International Light Year Honoree in 2008. The Advertising Club of New York presented Oliver with a Star of Madison Ave Award in 2013 for her efforts working with the advertising industry in New York City. In December 2013, she was honored with an industry tribute award at the 23rd Annual Gotham Independent Film Awards. In 2014, Oliver was honored by the Ghetto Film School and Fordham University's WFUV annual gala.
