= Richard Brick =

American film producer

- Born: September 20, 1945; Manhattan, New York City, U.S.
- Died: April 2, 2014 (aged 68); Manhattan, New York City
- Occupation: film producer
- Known for: Former Commissioner of New York City’s Mayor's Office of Film, Theatre & Broadcasting
- Spouse: Sara Bershtel

Richard Michael Brick (September 20, 1945 – April 2, 2014) was an American film producer, professor of film at Columbia University, and former Commissioner of New York City’s Mayor's Office of Film, Theatre & Broadcasting. He was born in New York City, United States.

As a producer, Brick is best known for his three pictures with Woody Allen: Deconstructing Harry, Celebrity and Sweet and Lowdown. He also was the Co-Producer of Emir Kusturica’s only picture in the U.S., Arizona Dream; Producer of Robert M. Young’s Caught and Joseph Vasquez’ Hangin' with the Homeboys. In television Brick was senior producer of two network specials for Peter Jennings: The JFK Assassination - Beyond Conspiracy and UFOs: Seeing Is Believing.

Brick had a long involvement with the graduate film program at Columbia University, where he received his M.F.A. degree in 1971. He joined the faculty and served as chairman and as co-chairman with Miloš Forman from 1987 through 1989, and was an adjunct professor of producing from 1990. During his tenure Brick created the first Columbia University Film Festival, which celebrated its 25th anniversary in 2012.

Brick served as New York City's first Commissioner of the Mayor's Office of Film, Theatre and Broadcasting from 1992 through 1994 (the Office was previously headed by a Director), following the studio boycott of New York City during 1990–91. Brick was also involved with the labor side of the film industry as a member of the Producers Guild of America and as a member of the Eastern Assistant Directors/Unit Production Managers Council, as a delegate to the 2003, 2005, 2007, 2009 and 2011 National Conventions, as a member of the PAC National Leadership Council of the Directors Guild of America, and as a member of the DGA National Negotiating Committee 2010–11. He died of esophageal cancer on April 2, 2014, aged 68.

He is survived by his wife, the publisher of Metropolitan Books, Sara Bershtel.
