= Kelly Choi =

American presenter (born 1976)

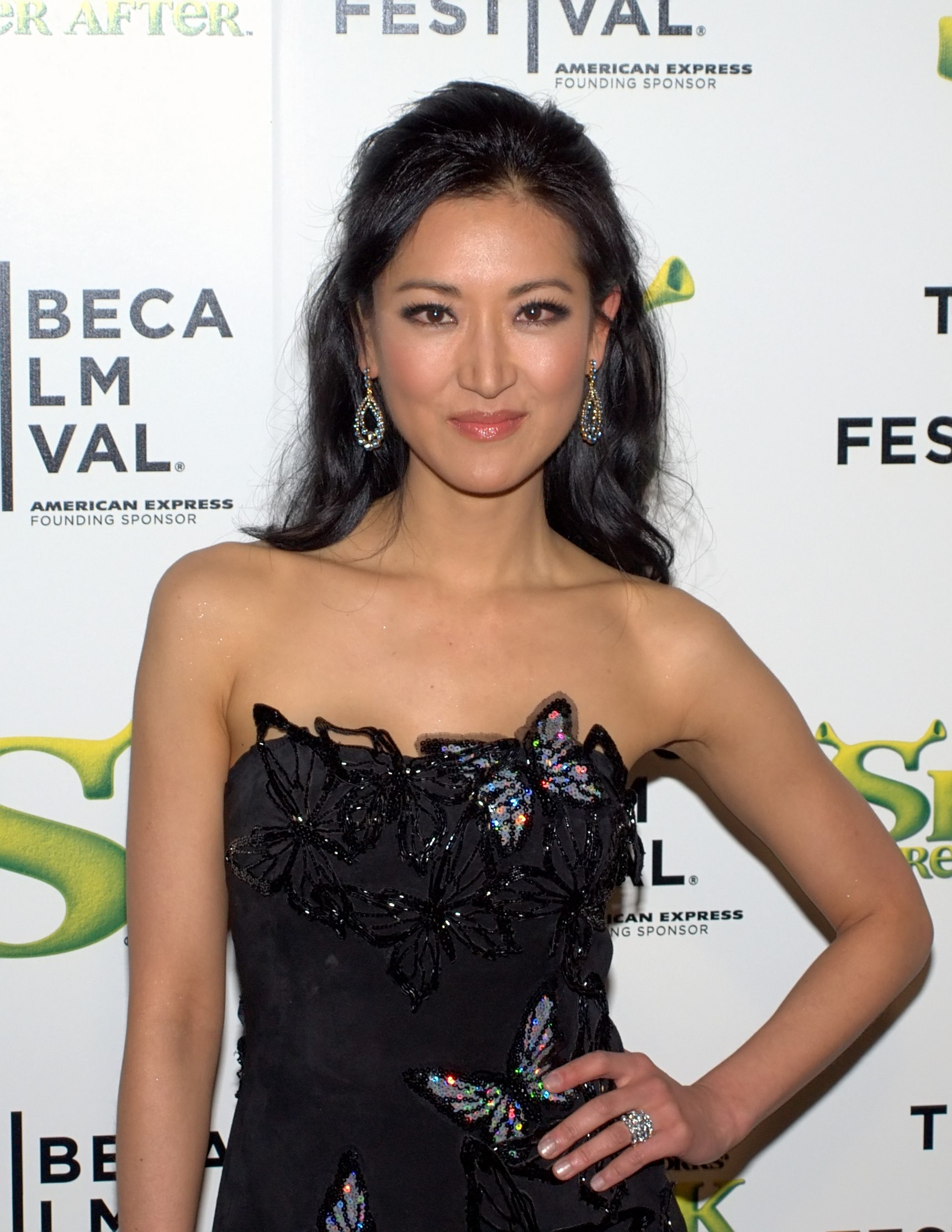
- Kelly Choi at the Tribeca Film Festival 2010
- Born: Young Choi; February 7, 1976 (age 50); Seoul, South Korea
- Education: College of William & Mary; Columbia University
- Occupation: Television personality

Kelly Choi (born February 7, 1976) is an American television personality on NYC Media, the official broadcast service of the City of New York. A former host of Bravo TV's Top Chef spin-off, Top Chef Masters, she has also been presenter of the documentary series Secrets of New York.

== Early life and career ==
Choi was a preschooler when she immigrated to the U.S. with her family. Growing up in central Virginia, she Americanized her given name and, as Kelly Choi, received her bachelor's degree from the College of William & Mary and her master's in journalism from Columbia University in Manhattan. During and following her studies, Choi, who stands 5 ft 10 in (1.78 m), was a model with Ford Models, won the Elite Models Look of the Year and worked as a VJ for MTV Korea.

== Career ==
Choi made the professional transition to the New York area by hosting Freckles, a lifestyle program on the cable channel Plum TV, which is seen primarily in affluent vacation communities, in this case, the Hamptons in Long Island's Suffolk County. She entered the highly competitive New York media market after joining nyctv (now NYC Media), in 2004. Executive producers Arick Wierson and Trevor Scotland initially brought her to host the pilot episode for Secrets of New York. She subsequently went on to host three seasons of the series, nationally distributed by PBS, and developed Eat Out NY, another nyctv program in which, as the host/guide to the city's restaurants, she gained high visibility and popularity.

For a few months in 2006, as part of a unique content-sharing arrangement between nyctv and NBC's flagship station WNBC, Eat Out NY and Choi became popular fixtures of the Tri-State Region's noontime viewing. In 2007, she was invited as a guest judge on the Food Network's Iron Chef and selected to host the James Beard Awards, which are considered the "Oscars" of the food and restaurant industry. In 2011, she was a host of Late Night Kung Fu, a weekly series that celebrates classic, English-dubbed kung fu films.

Choi has received three Emmy nominations from the New York chapter of the National Academy of Television Arts and Sciences.

== See also ==
- Koreans in New York City
- New Yorkers in journalism
- Newsday
