= Made in NYC (nonprofit) =

- Formation: 2003; 23 years ago
- Legal status: nonprofit initiative
- Headquarters: Brooklyn
- Website: https://www.madeinnyc.org/

Made in NYC is a nonprofit initiative of the Pratt Center for Community Development that supports manufacturers and makers operating within the five boroughs of New York City. Funded with grants from the New York City Council as well as the Garment District Alliance, Made in NYC offers free membership to manufacturing companies with operations based in either the Bronx, Brooklyn, Manhattan, Queens, or Staten Island.

== History ==
Made in NYC was first founded in 2003 to rebuild urban manufacturing after the September 11 attacks, which impacted many communities and businesses within the city. Originally an initiative of the New York Industrial Retention Network (NYIRN), a nonprofit founded in 1976. in 2010, the NYIRN joined the Pratt Center for Community Development, where it was then consolidated into one program called Made in NYC.
