= NYC Media =

Online media network

Agency overview
- Jurisdiction: City of New York
- Headquarters: Manhattan Municipal Building (25th–29th floors)
- Agency executives: Rafael Espinal, Commissioner; Karen Johnson, Interim General Manager
- Parent agency: Mayor's Office of Media and Entertainment
- Website: www.nyc.gov/media

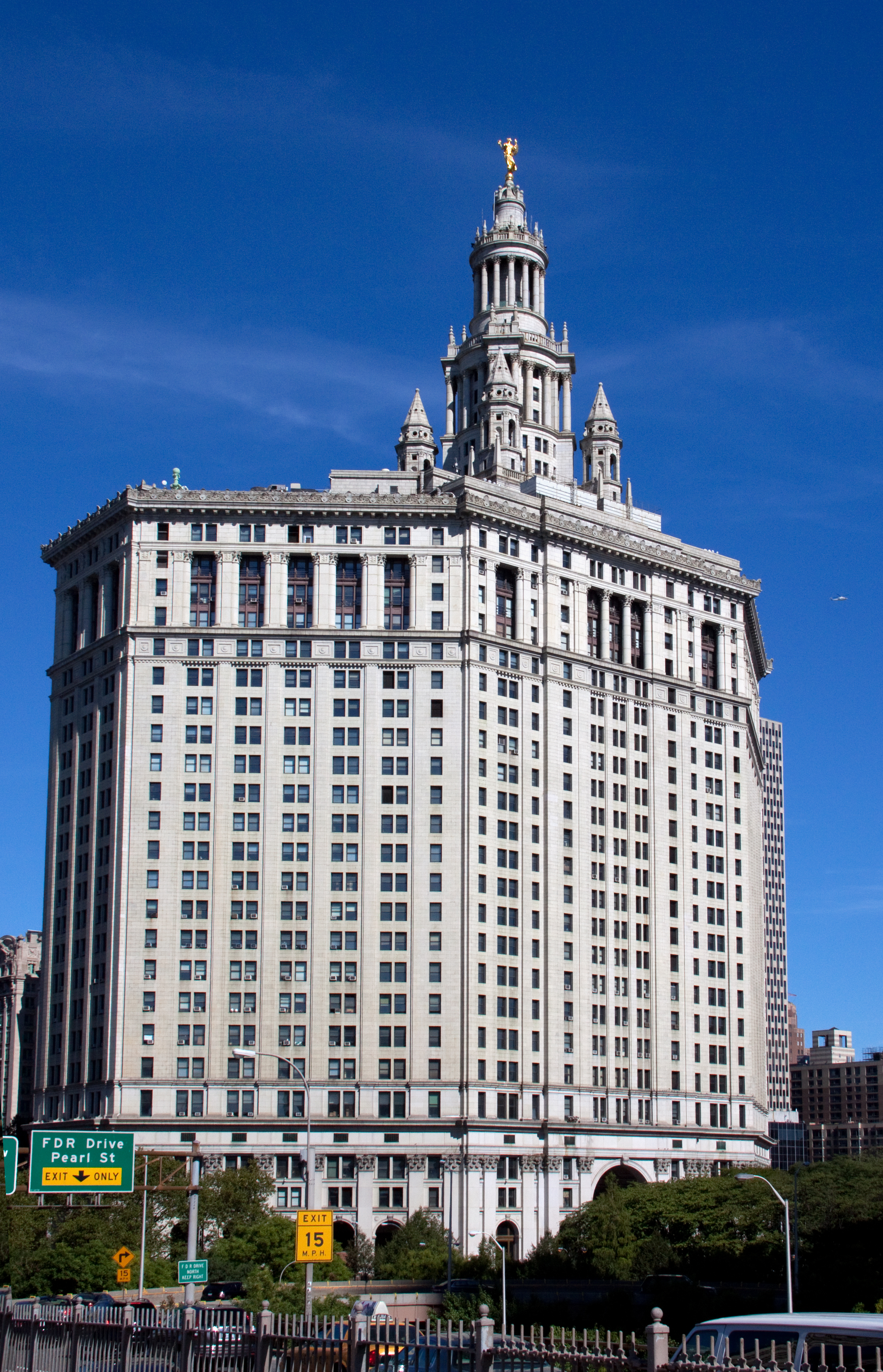
The Manhattan Municipal Building, where NYC Media is located.

NYC Media is the official public radio, television, and online media network and broadcasting service of New York City, which has been called the media capital of the world. The network oversees four public television channels, a public radio station, and an Internet video on demand service.

Located in the Manhattan Municipal Building at 1 Centre Street, NYC Media occupies the tower portion, from the 25th floor to the 29th floor, as well as transmission facilities in the Empire State Building, in the Condé Nast Building in Times Square, and in Brooklyn.

NYC Media is an amalgamation of channels, studios, distribution and production entities. NYC Media was originally called NYC TV when it took over Crosswalks Television in 2003; it became NYC Media Group when it acquired control of broadcast stations WNYE (FM) and WNYE-TV as well.

In late 2009, it was announced that NYC Media Group would be split off from the New York City Department of Information Technology and Telecommunications and merge with the Mayor's Office of Film, Theatre and Broadcasting to form the Mayor's Office of Media and Entertainment, in the aftermath of an embezzlement scandal that saw many of NYC Media Group's higher-ups resign or leave.

== History ==
In 2003, co-founders Seth Unger and Arick Wierson – both aides to Mayor of New York City Michael Bloomberg – launched NYC-TV, which replaced "Crosswalks Television". Unger and Wierson set out to create a slew of new, slickly-produced shows about life in New York, alongside live coverage of NYC press conferences and hearings.

In 2005, NYC TV expanded when it acquired WNYE-TV along with the radio station WNYE (FM). The new group was called NYC Media Group. The local cable channels programmed by NYC Media provide coverage of a diverse array of programming formats ranging from local politics and government news on channel 74, traffic camera feeds on channel 72, and ethnic/international programming on channel 73.

NYC Media has received attention as an innovator in municipal broadcasting. Since its inception, NYC Media has been nominated for 160 New York Emmy Awards, winning 42. It has also won 42 Telly Awards and 4 Promax Awards and was nominated for 4 Webby Awards. Cities such as Seoul, Paris, Rio de Janeiro, and Los Angeles have expressed interest in replicating the station's success. On September 24, 2007, Mayor Bloomberg held a press conference to introduce NYC Media On Demand, a partnership with online video platform Brightcove to offer on demand programming online.

Its main over-the-air broadcast channel, WNYE-TV (channel 25), reaches the New York City metropolitan area, which includes Nassau, Orange, Putnam, Suffolk and Westchester counties in New York state as well as portions of New Jersey and Connecticut. WNYE-TV is carried on all area cable and satellite systems. NYC Media's main broadcast signal, WNYE-TV, reaches 7.43 million households (approximately 20 million people) in the New York City market, thus making it the fifth largest local television station in the United States. The main broadcast station is seen in the New York City area on channel 25 on all cable and satellite systems with the exception of Optimum, where it is seen on channel 22.

In April 2009, Trevor Scotland, then-COO of NYC Media Group, was arrested on charges of embezzling $60,000 of advertising money from the network, along with an accomplice, Vincent R. Taylor. Scotland instructed advertisers to go through Taylor's company, VRT Advertising; Taylor pocketed 20 percent of this money, with Scotland taking the rest. Taylor later stated in court he was afraid that if he didn't follow Scotland's orders, he would be blacklisted from the network. In the aftermath of this scandal, several high-ranking executives at NYC Media, including Unger and Wierson (many of whom had connections to then-Mayor Bloomberg) left their posts abruptly; an internal probe revealed many of these executives had been using city-funded staff and resources for their own projects, and were often absent from the NYC Media offices; Scotland testified that Wierson was often absent and allowed him to forge Wierson's signatures on documents if necessary. Scotland pled guilty to charges of embezzlement and wire fraud, and was sentenced in March 2010 to 15 months in prison for his role in the fiasco; by this time, the NYC Media unit had been reassigned from the Department of Information Technology and Telecommunications (DoITT) to the Mayor's Office of Film and Broadcasting (though the move was not publicized at the time). It was suspected that this executive upheaval played a role in the cancellation of music series New York Noise (a show created during Wierson's tenure), though this was never confirmed outright.

== Television ==
NYC Media operates four television channels: NYC life, NYC gov, NYC drive, and NYC world.

- NYC life, is NYC Media's flagship television station and broadcasts as WNYE-TV channel 25.1 as well as appearing on local cable television as channel 22 on Optimum and on channel 25 on other cable services.
- NYC gov, covers city government meetings and press conferences. It appears on most local cable services as channel 74.
- NYC drive, formerly known as City Drive Live, provides live feeds from traffic cameras. It appears on most local cable services as channel 72.
- NYC world provides international and ethnic programming. It appears on most local cable services as channel 73.

Services on most of these channels had previously each been branded as NYC TV or nyctv with a cable channel number since 2003, and before that as Crosswalks Television.

== Radio ==
NYC Media operates WNYE (FM), branded as "Radio New York".

== See also ==
- WNYE (FM)
- WNYE-TV
- Media of New York City
- New Yorkers in journalism
- Secrets of New York
- Kelly Choi
- Harry Hunkele
- Katherine Oliver
