= Secrets of New York =

Secrets of New York is an American documentary television series created by Arick Wierson and presented by Kelly Choi. The series premiered on February 2, 2005 and is produced by NYC Media, the official public broadcast service of New York City. The show won six New York Emmy Awards in 2007 and five in 2008. Secrets of New York airs on WNYE-TV, WNBC and on PBS stations nationwide and has been recognized for its approach to the television documentary format. Each episode describes an aspect of the history of New York City, such as a building, ending with one obscure fact presented as a "secret".

== Series history ==
Secrets of New York was created in 2004 by Arick Wierson, then manager of NYC TV. The show's first season, sometimes referred to as the "lost season", was very different from subsequent seasons. The first season contained five episodes and was produced, written and directed by Kelly Choi and Philip Ng. The second season saw the addition of producers Harry Hunkele and Buboo Kakati. The third season was also created by Hunkele and Kakati and consisted of three longer specials. The fourth season aired in 2011, featuring new graphics and music. Kelly Choi has hosted every episode of the series.

In 2006, the series was picked by NBC's flagship station WNBC for distribution on its digital station (WNBC 4.4) in the New York market. The show also aired on PBS stations across the United States in 2006 to 2007. Additionally, the first four episodes of the second season were sold on DVD through the City of New York's CityStore and audio podcast versions are syndicated on the National Public Radio (NPR) web site.

== Cultural phenomenon ==
Choi took her character in a dramatically new direction in season two. Under the direction of Wierson and Hunkele, Choi was outfitted in a black vinyl overcoat and donned spiked stilettos. The show’s street location shoots around town became a self-serving grassroots marketing strategy for the program. Choi and shiny black fatigues inspired by the film The Matrix, quickly developed a following, especially among local media and gossip sites such as Media Bistro, Gothamist and Gawker. Bloggers speculated about hidden meanings in the show's graphics and props. Of particular interest was Choi's jewelry because, although her outfit is identical in every episode, she is always donning a different style of necklace. The producers, sensing that the show was on the verge of a cultural tipping point, interacted with the bloggers, egging them on by scanning in mysterious messages and codes onto Choi's jewelry.

== Move to high definition ==
Secrets of New York began shooting in HD in early 2007, after WNBC ordered a special episode for its coverage of the Tribeca Film Festival. The last four episodes of the series were shot in HD, but were aired in SD.
