= WNYE (FM) =

Public radio station in New York City

- New York, New York; United States
- Frequency: 91.5 MHz (HD Radio)
- Branding: Radio New York

Programming
- Format: Variety, educational
- Affiliations: NPR; PRX

Ownership
- Owner: NYC Media; (New York City Department of Information Technology and Telecommunications)
- Sister stations: WNYE-TV

History
- First air date: November 1938 (Apex band); 1942 (FM band)
- Former call signs: WCNY (1938–1939)
- Call sign meaning: New York Education

Technical information
- Licensing authority: FCC
- Facility ID: 3539
- Class: B1
- ERP: 2,000 watts
- HAAT: 281 meters (922 ft)
- Transmitter coordinates: 40.7562°N 73.9862°W

Links
- Public license information: Public file; LMS
- Website: www.nyc.gov/site/media/radio/radio-home.page

WNYE (91.5 MHz) is a non-commercial educational FM radio station licensed to New York, New York. The station is operated, along with WNYE-TV (channel 25), by NYC Media, a division of the Mayor's Office of Media and Entertainment. Studios are located at the City University of New York's Graduate Center at 365 Fifth Avenue, and the transmitter site is at the former Condé Nast Building.

WNYE does not offer a live stream of its broadcasts, although many past clips are available through the NYC Media phone app.

== Programming ==
As of August 31, 2015, WNYE aired adult album alternative music by simulcasting WFUV weekdays from 6 a.m. to 10 am. On weekday late mornings and afternoons, the station airs news programming from NPR and other public radio organizations. That includes the NPR news show All Things Considered, Here and Now from WBUR-FM in Boston and 1A, a news and interview program from WAMU in Washington, D.C. Late nights, music programs are heard including the World Cafe from WXPN Philadelphia, Afropop Worldwide from Public Radio Exchange and Echoes which specializes in ambient and electronic music. Evenings and weekends are devoted to ethnic programming for the Greek, Irish, Croatian, Haitian, Slavic and Brazilian communities.

Because its funding comes from the City of New York, WNYE is different from most non-commercial radio stations in that it does not ask for listener donations and it airs no fund drives.

== History ==
=== Establishment as AM Apex station WCNY ===
Organized radio broadcasting was introduced in the United States in the early 1920s, and by the mid-1930s the standard AM broadcast band was considered to be too full to allow any meaningful increase in the number of stations. Looking to expand the number of available frequencies, the Federal Communications Commission (FCC) began to issue licenses to parties interested in testing the suitability of using higher transmitting frequencies between roughly 25 and 44 MHz. These stations were informally known as "Apex" stations, due to the tall height of their transmitter antennas, which were needed because coverage was primarily limited to local line-of-sight distances. These original Apex stations operated under experimental licenses, and like standard broadcasting stations used amplitude modulation (AM) transmissions.

After monitoring the first group of Apex stations assignments, the FCC realized that, due to the strengthening of the ionosphere during periods of high solar activity, at times the lower end of the VHF frequencies would produce strong, and undesirable, skywave signals that were heard as far way as Australia. This determination led to the FCC moving the developing broadcasting service stations to higher frequencies that were less affected by solar influences. In October 1937, the FCC announced a sweeping allocation of frequency assignments that included a band for Apex stations, consisting of 75 channels with 40 kHz separations, and spanning from 41.02 to 43.98 MHz. In addition, in January 1938 the band's first 25 channels, from 41.02 to 41.98 MHz, were reserved for non-commercial educational stations. (Although there had been stations operated by educational institutions on the standard AM band since the early 1920s, at this time there was not a separate license classification for them.)

WCNY began broadcasting as an AM Apex station on 41.10 MHz in November 1938, licensed to the Board of Education, City of New York, giving WNYE an earlier starting date than any other FM station in New York City. It was the second educational Apex station, preceded only by WBOE (now WCLV) in Cleveland, Ohio. The station's original studios and transmitter were located at the Brooklyn Technical High School, and it served as a laboratory for developing programming for the city's public school system, and was known as the High School of the Air. Later its broadcasts were expanded to include adult learning, community-interest and ethnic programming.

On October 25, 1939, the station's call letters were changed to WNYE, because the original call sign of WCNY was considered to be too similar to WNYC, the New York City-owned municipal station.

=== Conversion to FM ===
At the time the Apex band was established the FCC noted that "The Commission at an early date will consider carefully the needs and requirements for high-frequency broadcast stations using both conventional [AM] modulation and frequency modulation". The commission's studies soon found significant advantages to FM transmissions over the Apex AM signals, with sound quality, and especially resistance to interference from static, including from lightning, found to be far superior for FM. In May 1940, the FCC decided to authorize an FM broadcast band, effective January 1, 1941, operating on 40 channels spanning 42–50 MHz, with the first five channels reserved for educational stations. This new assignment also resulted in the elimination of the Apex band, and the Apex stations were informed that they needed to either go silent or convert to FM. Prior to switching over to FM, WNYE received a series of special authorizations that permitted it to continue to use its Apex AM transmitter until June 29, 1941.

In 1942 WNYE made the conversion to FM transmissions, now broadcasting at 42.1 MHz. Three years later the FCC announced that, due to interference concerns, it was reallocating the current FM "low band" frequencies to other services, and existing FM band stations would be relocated to 88-106 MHz (later expanded to 108 MHz). In July 1946 the FCC directed that FM stations currently operating on 42-44 MHz would have to move to new frequencies by the end of the year, and WNYE's assignment was changed to 44.9 MHz, although it was also reported that instead of making this short-term adjustment the station planned to stay silent until it was ready to begin operations on the new FM band, where it was initially assigned to 91.7 MHz. A subsequent reallocation in the fall of 1947 moved WNYE to its current frequency of 91.5 MHz.

During 1956–58, WNYE and the New York City Board of Education developed educational programming for classroom use, series like "Americans to Remember" and "Hands Across the World". WNYE shared broadcast copies with the National Association of Educational Broadcasters (NAEB) which were distributed via the NAEB Tape Network and rebroadcast by member stations, e.g. WOSU's School of the Air (Ohio).

In April 1967, the Board of Education added a television station, WNYE-TV (channel 25), also broadcasting classroom instruction programs and other educational shows.

In the mid-1990s, WNYE's studios were moved to nearby George Westinghouse High School in Downtown Brooklyn.

In December 2004, the Department of Education transferred the WNYE-FM-TV licenses to the New York City Department of Information Technology and Telecommunications. This integrated WNYE-FM-TV's operations with those of the city-owned cable television services CUNY-TV and Crosswalks Television Network, to form NYC Media. WNYE's format remained largely unchanged at that time, but in March 2007 the station was rebranded as "Radio New York, WNYE 91.5 FM". On February 11, 2008, station management announced a partnership with Seattle station KEXP-FM to produce a new format branded as "Radio Liberation", featuring indie rock music simulcast from KEXP. The format started on March 24, 2008, replacing a number of NPR, BBC and Public Radio International shows.

In 2009 it launched its digital programming with a new transmitter located at the Condé Nast Building (4 Times Square). In the early 2010s, WNYE carried New York Islanders hockey games, simulcast with WRHU in Hempstead, New York. On June 1, 2011, KEXP was replaced with "The Alternate Side" from Fordham University's WFUV. It featured indie rock and alternative rock programming. This ended on August 21, 2015.
