= WNYE-TV =

Television station in New York City

- New York, New York; United States
- Channels: Digital: 24 (UHF); Virtual: 25
- Branding: NYC Life

Programming
- Affiliations: 25.1: Non-commercial independent; 25.2: NYC GOV; 25.3: CUNY TV

Ownership
- Owner: NYC Media; (New York City Department of Information Technology & Telecommunications)
- Sister stations: Radio: WNYE

History
- First air date: April 5, 1967
- Former channel number: Analog: 25 (UHF, 1967–2009)
- Former affiliations: NET (1967–1970); PBS (1970–2004; a limited number of PBS programs continue to air)
- Call sign meaning: New York Education

Technical information
- Licensing authority: FCC
- Facility ID: 6048
- ERP: 180 kW
- HAAT: 309.7 m (1,016 ft)
- Transmitter coordinates: 40°45′22.4″N 73°59′10.5″W

Links
- Public license information: Public file; LMS
- Website: NYC Media website

WNYE-TV (channel 25) is a non-commercial independent television station in New York City. It is operated by NYC Media, a division of the Mayor's Office of Media and Entertainment, alongside public radio station WNYE (91.5 FM). The two stations share studios at the City University of New York's Graduate Center in Midtown Manhattan; WNYE-TV's transmitter is located at 4 Times Square.

== History ==
=== Instructional use (1967–2004) ===
WNYE-TV operates on New York City's original educational television allocation, one of ten awarded by the Federal Communications Commission (FCC) in 1952 to the University of the State of New York, the state's overall educational governing body. After initial plans to build a statewide network were abandoned, the construction permits were transferred to local educational interests; channel 25 was reassigned to the city's Board (now Department) of Education, operators of WNYE radio.

However, it was obvious soon after the FCC opened up the UHF band that a UHF station would not be nearly strong enough to cover a market that had grown to take in large swaths of southwestern Connecticut and northern New Jersey, as well as southern upstate New York and Long Island. Moreover, until 1964 UHF stations were usually unviewable without a separate converter. For this reason, in September 1962, Newark, New Jersey–based commercial independent WNTA-TV (channel 13) was converted into non-commercial WNDT (now WNET), which would become the New York metropolitan area's main educational outlet.

The Board of Education finally put WNYE-TV on the air on April 5, 1967. Originally, it was primarily focused on providing instructional programming that could be used in classrooms, while channel 13 served as the New York area's National Educational Television (NET) outlet. In its early years, channel 25's operational hours were exclusively limited to school hours (roughly from 8:30 a.m. to 4 p.m. on weekdays), with limited programming on weekends, holidays, and during the summer. The operational hours were extended gradually from 1970 onward as the station began to add programming from the Public Broadcasting Service (PBS) to its schedule.

The instructional PBS format carried WNYE-TV through its first three and-a-half decades of service. Along with the instructional shows, channel 25 aired programs that focused on the individual school districts located within the Board of Education, featuring participation from students as well as educators (some of these programs included District 2 Schoolvision, District 6 Speaks, District 9 at a Glance, District 10 Presents and Bronx High School Magazine). As the station's on-air hours expanded, leased-time foreign-language programming (from outside producers) was also added to the schedule, and by the mid-1990s, more (second-hand) PBS and other instructional shows replaced the local school district programs. When municipally owned WNYC-TV (channel 31, now WPXN-TV) was sold by the City of New York in 1996, WNYE-TV picked up that station's long-running series Video Music Box, as well as additional hours of leased-time ethnic programs that were previously aired on WNYC-TV.

In the immediate aftermath of the September 11 attacks in 2001, the station temporarily broadcast the programming of WABC-TV.

Former logos
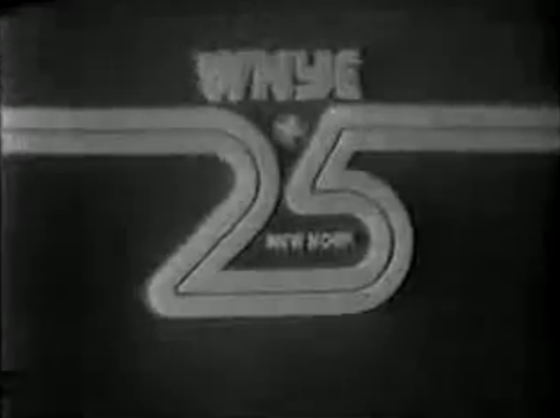
WNYE-TV station logo, c. late 1970s–early 1980s.

Station logo, c. mid–1990s.

Former logo for NYCTV, used for its numeric 25 branding.

=== NYC Media (2004–present) ===
In December 2004, the Department of Education transferred the licenses of the WNYE stations to the New York City Department of Information Technology and Telecommunications. The transfer integrated WNYE-FM-TV's operations with those of the city-owned cable television services CUNY TV and Crosswalks Television Network (now NYC Media), combining them to form the NYC Media Group. A few months prior to the transfer, the NYC Media Group began gradually phasing out WNYE-TV's PBS and instructional programs in favor of locally themed programming. By 2005, the primetime lineup was composed entirely of original productions. In the present day, WNYE-TV's offerings range from shows distributed by American Public Television, various ethnic programs, and a prime time lineup of shows aimed at a young, affluent urban audience. The majority of these offerings are produced in-house by NYC Media, including Cool in Your Code, Full Frontal Fashion and Eat Out NY. Among other WNYE-related productions, Secrets of New York has been syndicated nationally to public television stations, and it and Blueprint: New York City have been offered to the now-defunct digital cable and satellite network The Documentary Channel (both it and Halogen TV were replaced by Pivot in August 2013), which in turn has provided some programming to WNYE from its library.

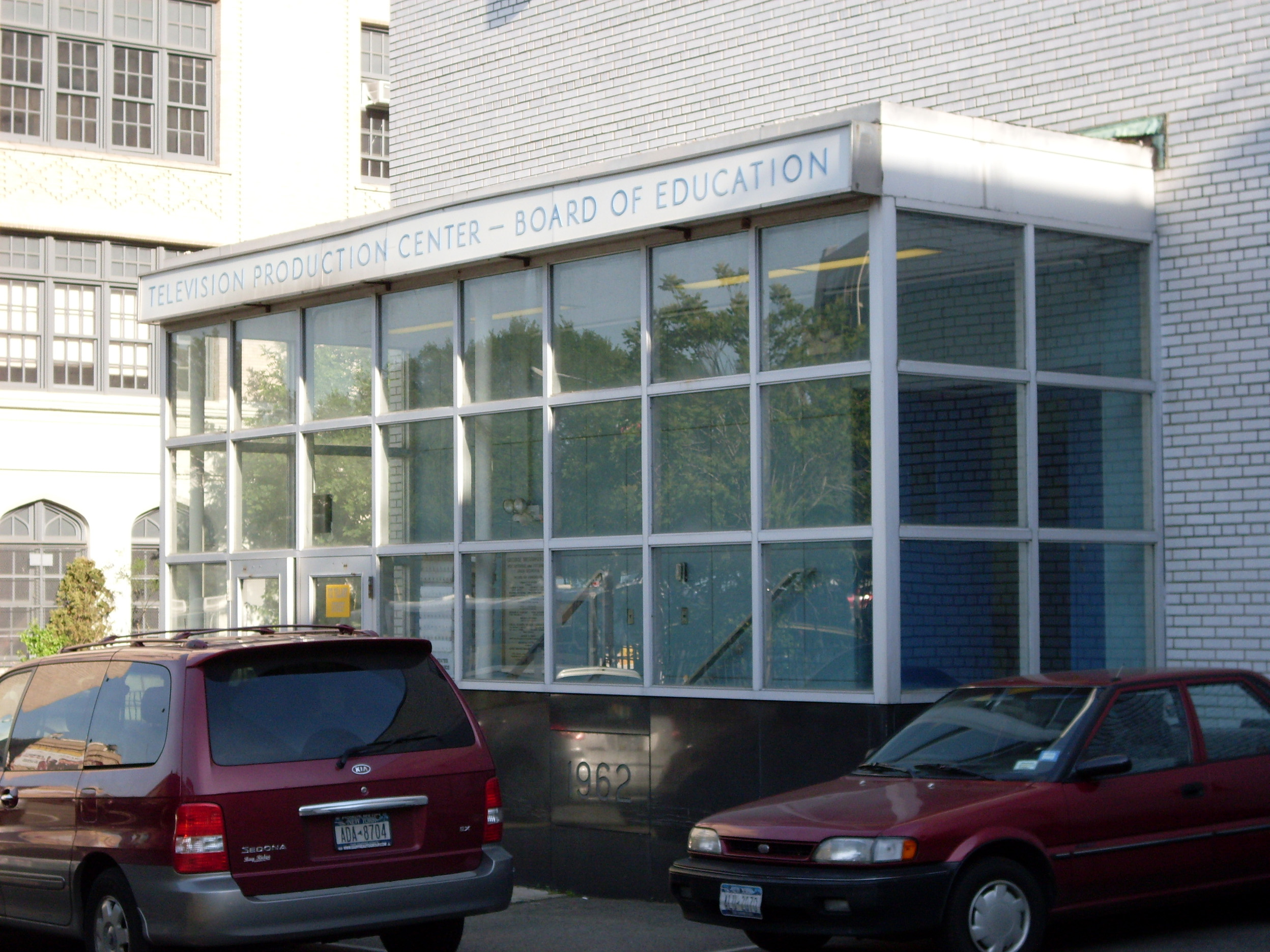
The former WNYE-TV studios within City Tech's Klitgord Hall in downtown Brooklyn. The studio and building have since been demolished.

With the format change, WNYE-TV also moved from its longtime studios at 112 Tillary Street in Downtown Brooklyn, in the now-demolished Klitgord Hall at the New York City College of Technology (a branch of the City University of New York). Both WNYE television and radio (which was housed in Brooklyn Technical High School) now have offices at NYC Media's headquarters in the Manhattan Municipal Building in lower Manhattan and operate from the CUNY Graduate Center at Fifth Avenue and 34th Street.

== Programming ==
NYC Media programming on its flagship channel 25 is focused principally on actuality formats such as lifestyle, documentary and reality entertainment. The show formats range from programs like Globe Trekker, VideoFashion News, and Endless Feast, to NYC Media original programs such as Eat Out NY, New York 360*, and Cool in Your Code as well as the nationally syndicated show, Secrets of New York. Other popular programs, like New York Noise and The Bridge focus on the city's music scene. New York Noise has a loyal following among musicians. Tommy Ramone was the host of an episode and the show has featured such bands as Fischerspooner, Animal Collective, Cat Power and the National. Well known Indie and electronica stars such as Moby are known to pop in for surprise appearances and performances. Artists like Beirut and groups such as Vampire Weekend and the Plain White T's openly credit their big break to the show and its producer, Shirley Braha. The show is filmed around the city, from longtime clubs like Irving Plaza to the accordion shop Main Squeeze.

=== Ratings ===
Companies such as Subaru, American Express, Delta Air Lines and Snapple, as well as local establishments, have been active in underwriting NYC Media programs.

In 2006, NYC Media became the first public broadcaster in the United States to enter into a deal with a major commercial broadcast network, NBC, to air its shows. NYC Media aired weekdays on WNBC and on digital channel 4.4 / 28.4. Continental, Delta, and South African airlines have featured NYC Media on their flights. Carnival Cruise Lines launched an NYC Media closed-circuit channel on its New York-bound cruises in 2006. In that same year, NYC Media programming became available for purchase on DVD.

=== Criticism ===
Since the relaunch of the station, the station's popularity has been reflected in ratings, underwriter support, and press coverage. Despite these successes, the station has come under some degree of criticism from the New York City Council, and Councilmember Gale Brewer who has called NYC Media "too hip and flashy". Although Brewer's rhetoric has subsided since former general manager Arick Wierson huddled with Deputy Mayor Ed Skyler and agreed to produce a new news program entitled City Scoop, Brewer still contends that NYC Media has strayed from its original mission in search of audience share and advertising dollars. On August 4, 2009, the Village Voice published a cover article criticizing the station's founder, Arick Wierson, for his many outside business interests, and his close relationship to the Mayor and other wealthy businessmen.

== Technical information ==
=== Subchannels ===
The station's signal is multiplexed:

Subchannels of WNYE-TV
| Subchannel | Res. | Short name | Programming |
|---|---|---|---|
| 25.1 | 1080i | NYLIFE | Main WNYE-TV programming |
| 25.2 | 480i | NYGOV | NYC Municipal Government events |
| 25.3 | 1080i | CUNY | CUNY TV |

As of June 2018, WNYE-TV broadcasts its main channel in 1080i high definition.

=== Analog-to-digital conversion ===
WNYE-TV ended regular programming on its analog signal, over UHF channel 25, on June 12, 2009, as part of the federally mandated transition from analog to digital television. The station's digital signal remained on its pre-transition UHF channel 24, using virtual channel 25.
