= Music Hour =

Music Hour may refer to:

- "Music Hour" (Porno Graffitti song), 2000
- Music Appreciation Hour, NBC radio series
- Hour of Music, Australian television series
