= School of the Air (Ohio) =

Ohio's radio broadcast experiment with Remote learning

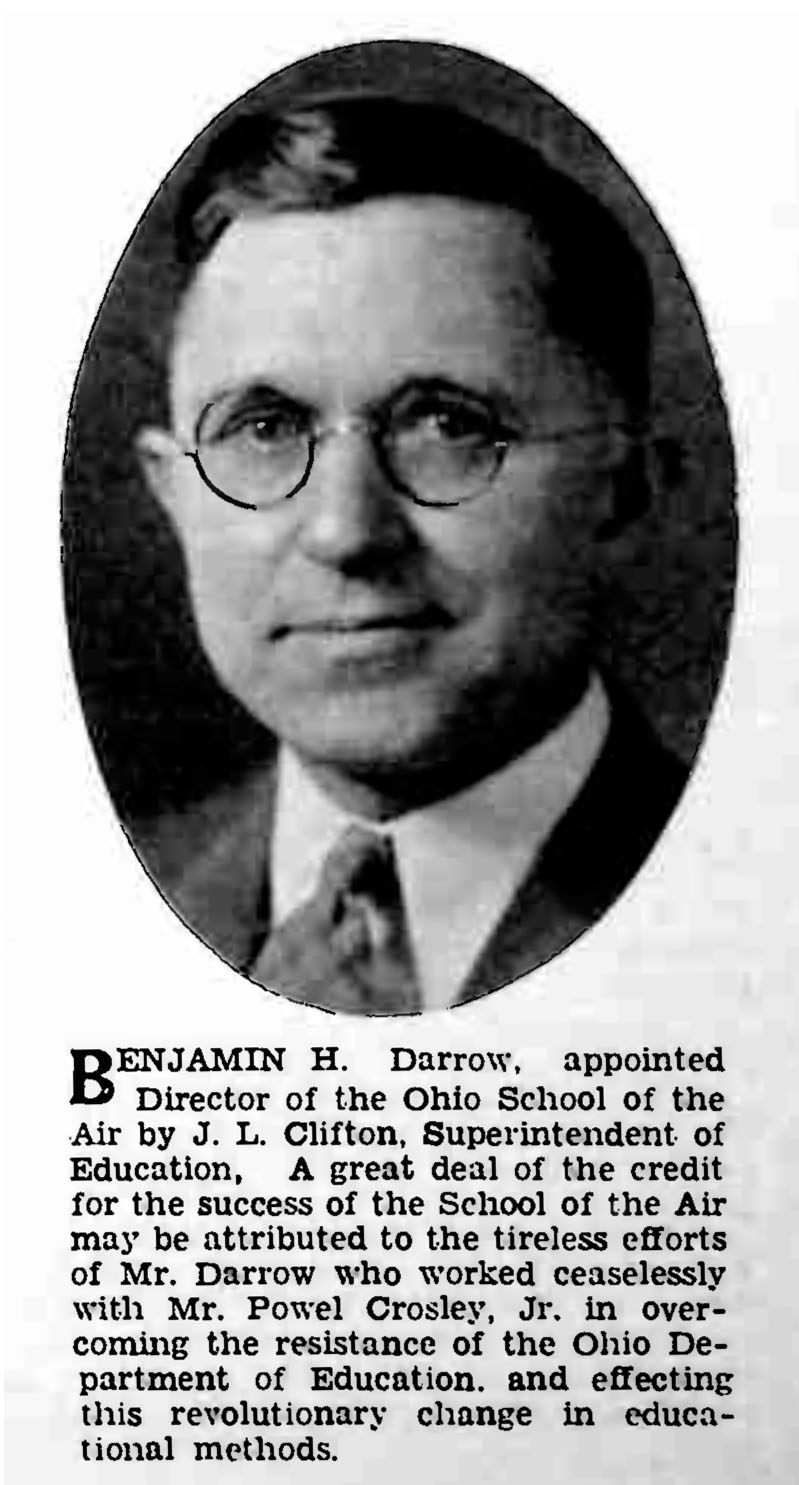
- (Natalie Gibbings, 1929)
- Other names: Ohio School of the Air
- Genre: Educational programming
- Country of origin: United States
- Language: English
- Home station: WEAO-AM (later WOSU-AM, WVSG-AM); WLW
- TV adaptations: WOSU-TV
- Directed by: Benjamin H. Darrow (1929–1937)
- Original release: January 7, 1929

The School of the Air (Ohio), or Ohio School of the Air (OSOA), is a radio program established in October 1928 and began live broadcasting on January 7, 1929. Its abbreviation Air School was used in some newspaper broadcast schedules.

The Ohio Department of Education operated the program as an experimental supportive tool for its state-wide public-school system. Initial State funding was bolstered by grants from the Payne Study and Experiment Fund. OSOA was the first State sponsored educational radio broadcast program in the Nation. Program broadcasts were planned and conducted by Benjamin H. Darrow, known on-air as "Uncle Ben, The Radio Schoolmaster". Programming was initially simulcast from AM radio stations in Columbus and Cincinnati, Ohio.

In 1937 OSOA's experimental status concluded and operational responsibility was transferred to Ohio State University (OSU), where educational broadcasting continued through at least 1973, a span of 44 years. By 1955 several science programs had expanded into OSOA television broadcasts. During later years, broadcasts were conducted by OSU's Telecommunications Center via WOSU-AM, WOSU-FM; and WOSU-TV.

OSOA received nationwide publicity and renown; it was credited as being the most carefully developed statewide school broadcasting system in the country. In 1932 it was praised in the British journal Nature and in the late 1930s a radio station in Peiping, China, requested copies of its program scripts for re-broadcasting.

== Directors and supervisors ==
- Benjamin H. Darrow, OSOA Director, 1928–1937
- Ann Charles, WOSU program director, 1937–1941
- Gordon G. Humbert, OSOA Director, 1938–1973
- Margaret C. Tyler, OSOA Supervisor, 1941–1968

== History ==
Ohio-born Benjamin Darrow was an educator, entrepreneur and salesman. He promoted radio as an educational tool and relocated to Chicago in 1924 when radio station WLS, owned by Sears, Roebuck and Company, hired him to develop broadcasts of the "Little Schoolhouse of the Air". The program was known as the "nation's first school-of-the-air program", with Darrow as the "radio schoolmaster". It aired for a year and half attracting an audience of 23,000 to 28,000 schoolchildren in Chicago and neighboring states. Chicago's school of the air (SOA) success inspired Darrow to expand the concept, conceiving a national school of the air. He began searching for sponsors and in 1927 connected with the Payne Study and Experiment Fund of New York. He was hired to study the feasibility of implementing such a national program, presenting those results at the National Education Associations (NAE) annual meeting in Boston, February 1928. There was consensus to proceed, but progress paused awaiting further NAE assessment.

Darrow returned to Ohio, soliciting the Ohio State Director of Education in July 1928. In October he was again contacted by the Payne Fund in Cleveland, its administrators interested in developing educational radio focused on Ohio's classrooms. They offered continued salaried employment during an initial experimental phase, supported by their Payne Study and Experiment Fund. He was titled "Chief Investigator of the Payne, Study and Experimental Fund" and loaned to State of Ohio for the experiment."

OSU's Bureau of Educational Research believed programs like OSOA extremely beneficial to rural area schools, due to disparities existing between rural and city schools, and promoted State-wide radio coverage. Access to a second broadcasting station was crutial- WEAO did not singularly have full radio coverage to the schools across Ohio. Powel Crosley Jr., owner of Cincinnati's higher-powered WLW radio station, offered to co-broadcast WEAO's educational programming free of charge.

The Payne Fund conducted research studies during 1927–28, surveying the superintendents and principals from hundreds of American schools on the benefits of educational broadcasting. Positive responses led to the Ohio Department of Education organizing the Ohio School of the Air, to provide all students with supplemental lessons in "history, literature, health, and art". The Ohio legislature allocated $20,000 for the project. John L. Clifton, Ohio's State Director of Education, pronounced Darrow as Ohio's first "Director of Educational Broadcasting", the first such director of any State. OSOA's operational planning began on Oct 6, 1928, with OSOA's first classroom broadcast on Jan 7, 1929.

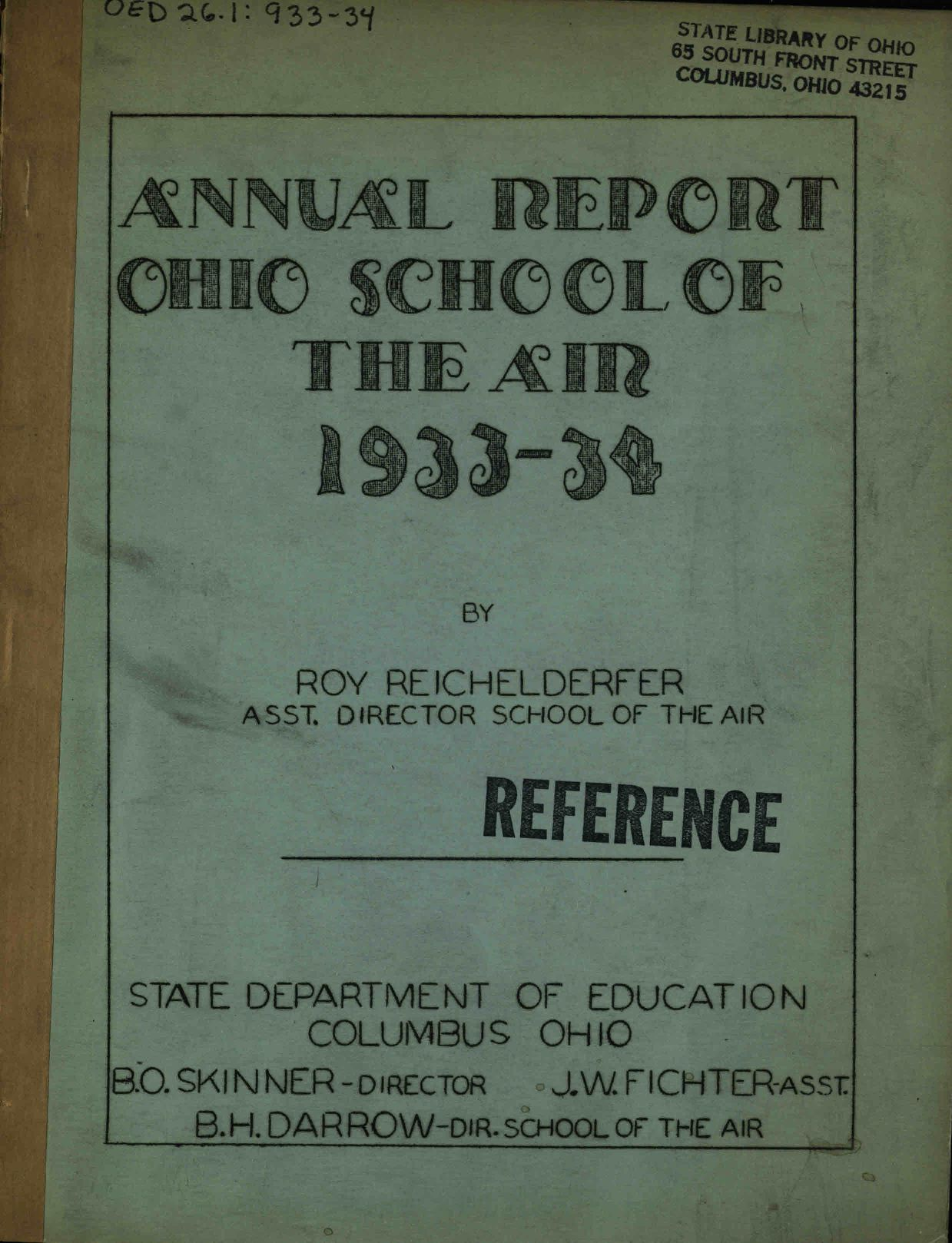
Annual Report Ohio School of the Air, 1933-34

== Operation ==
During OSOA's experimental phase the State Department of Education published annual operating reports at the conclusion of each school year, continuing through its final 1936-37 session. Thereafter, annual operating summaries were reported in OSU's College of Education Educational Research Bulletin's.

=== Funding ===
Ohio Legislature's OSOA funding
Year	$ Approp.
1929	20,000
1930	20,000
1931	14,650
1932	14,050
1933	15,290
1934	15,290
1935	13,641
1936	9,278
1937	0
1938	13,000 (to OSU)
1939	7,500 (to OSU)

The Ohio Senate and House of Representatives approved $40,000 for OSOA for the 1930-1931 biennium for purpose of radio broadcast education, the first State in the Nation to fund state-wide educational radio. That level of support was short lived due to effects of the Depression, ending midway through the period on Jan 1, 1931. State legislature eliminated the prior 1931 authorization reapproving only $24,700 for the 1931-1932 biennium. The legislature's final approval for July 1935-July 37 was "virtually at the strangulation level", with funds previously paid for talent being eliminated.

OSU's 1945 Bureau of Educational Research Bulletin listed OSOA's State funding from 1929 to 1936 and its planned transition to OSU management in 1937; see accompanying table "Ohio Legislature's OSOA funding".

Without 1937 legislative funding the State Director of Education secured operational money from the Payne Fund enabling OSOA's regular annual report and preparations for transfer to OSU.

Additional income sources:

- Funding was solicited from supporting agencies during 1930-32.
  - A dozen schools provided cash and\or assistive personnel.
  - Organizations, e.g. the Columbus Federation of Women's Clubs, sponsored their favored program series.
  - OSU provided educational staff to produce and present new programs, e.g. the Nature series.
  - The National Committee on Education by Radio provided a cash donation.
  - Station WLW increased its OSOA support by sharing more of its dramatic and musical staff.
  - Cost savings were realized by substituting high-overhead series with newer programs. WLW's Crosley Players presented new dramatization series, ironically producing higher classroom approvals. Ohio's three neighboring states provided a new program series with representatives promoting the features and accomplishments within their regions.
- OSOA received the largest share of a $370,000 dispersal from the General Education program distributed among four elite educational radio projects c.1935.
- Due to budget constraints, OSOA experimented and found it feasible to rent out scripts from its program inventory. It created a feature service for other radio stations, collecting supplemental income from stations in Cleveland, Columbus and Cincinnati.
- Supplemental monies were redirected to OSOA from the Ohio Promotion Fund administered by Ohio's Director of Education and OSU's Director of Visual Education. During 1936 these funds paid salaries for several script writers.
- OSOA received some government support via depression-era recovery activities, e.g., the Federal Emergency Relief Administration (FERA, est. 1933) and the Works Progress Administration (WPA, est. 1935).
  - During 1933-35 OSOA used FERA-paid stenographers to help produce program publications and for office support and its understaffed radio workshops were backfilled via FERA's un-employed teachers lists.
  - OSOA added a summer school program in 1935, aided by FERA supplied staff.
  - WPA's first Federal Radio Workshop (FRW) was developed in Cincinnati, its staff selected from FERA's list of unemployed teachers and trained by OSOA's director in both script writing and radio broadcasting. In OSOA's 1936 budget analysis the FRW had contributed $21,050 in the value of its script writing and presentation, nearly twice the amount contributed by Ohio's State legislators.
  - In 1936 WPA's Federal Radio Workshop (FRW) and the Radio Education Project partnered with OSA to produce a series of Latin America travelogues, programs intended for commercial radio broadcasts. FRW also employed out-of-work Ohio educators to create a series of OSOA classroom programs. The “Travelog” program aligned with President Roosevelt’s Good Neighbor Policy, a revamped policy promoting cultural exchange where previous U.S. actions had involved military intervention. FRW's “Travelog” programming so obviously followed Roosevelt's new doctrine its works were labeled politically themed in radio industry publications.

=== Program planning and metrics ===
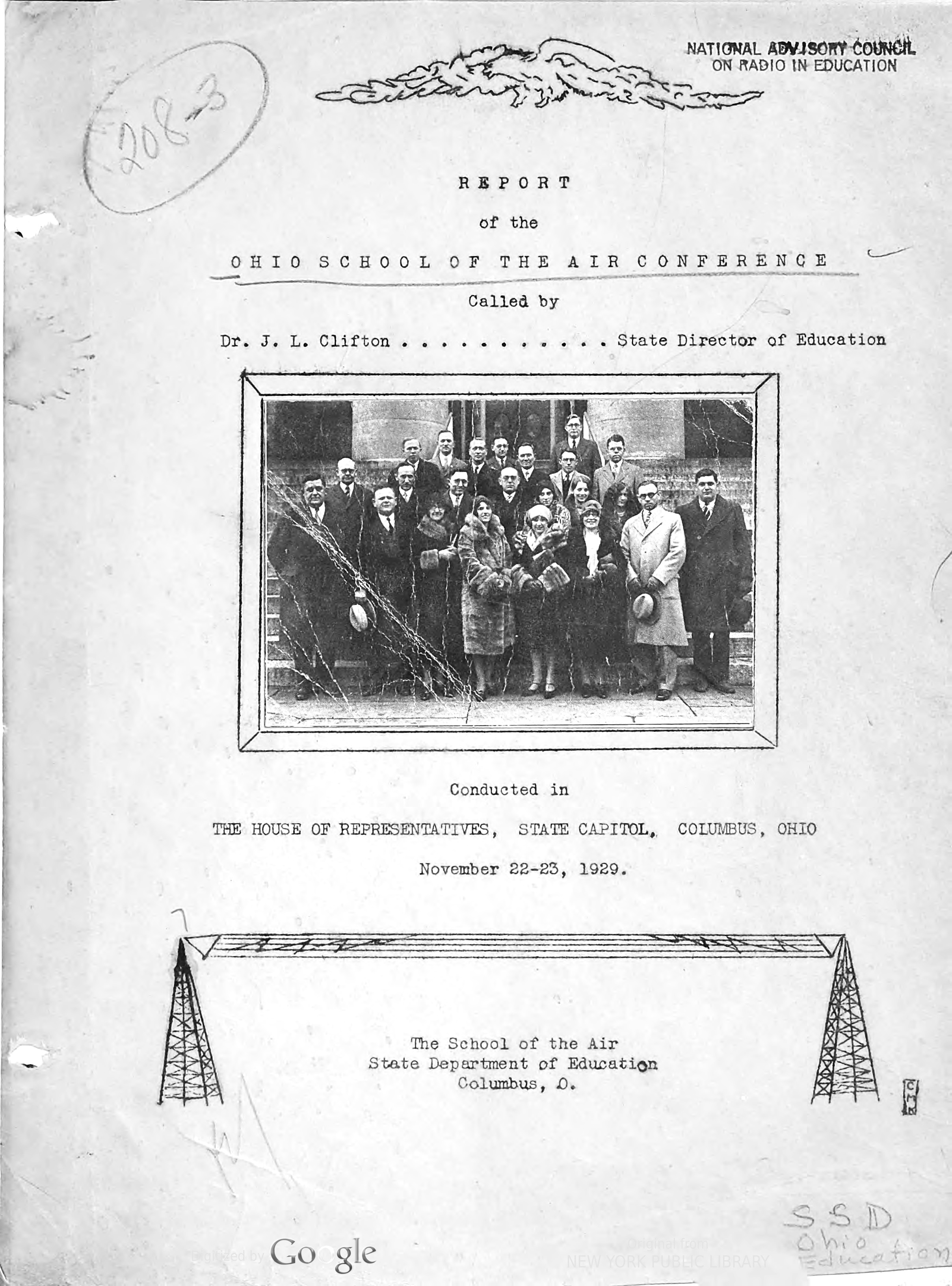
The Ohio School of the Air's first year's-end conference; November 22–23, 1929.

On November 22, 1929, near OSOA's first year's-end, a broadcast evaluation conference was held in Columbus, Ohio, by State Director of Education, J. L. Clifton. Its purpose was to present OSOA's current operational status, its curriculum summary and to develop corporative plans for increasing lessons' usefulness. Over forty educational representatives from across the state were present during the two-day event, attendees enumerated in the "Members of the Conference" list.

OSOA was assisted in 1930 when the Payne Fund supported educational radio development by funding the Institute for Education by Radio to provide nationwide aid to producers of educational programs. OSU's Bureau of Educational Research Radio Division conducted the institute's annual meetings with "proceedings published in the Education on the Air Yearbook" [sic]. It was said "there are fully a hundred problems in this field that need thorough investigation",(Koon, 1930) e.g. necessary to investigate and define:

- the purpose of educational broadcasts
- program lesson effectiveness
- methods for refining, improving lessons
- suitable training for broadcasters
- what schoolroom radio equipment is necessary
- how to assist teachers in the listening classrooms

The Bureau of Educational Research's Radio Division provided training to school administrators and teachers, both direct and by publications, on radio education and the use of radio. It conducted research studies quantifying radio program effectiveness, in compliance with objectives of a national study requested by the Federal Radio Education Committee, chartered by a General Education Board grant. It coordinated meetings between broadcasters and classroom teachers to access students' reactions and program ideas.

Darrow believed the best use of radio was to support the teacher by reinforcing existing curriculum, a philosophy supported by educational research. A criterion for OSOA's program selection was developed with potential topics having three necessities:

- align with subject preferences requested by school administrators
- adapt to presentation over the air with minimal visual support from classroom teachers
- "availability of talent" (knowledgeable, interesting, affordable presenters) capable of delivering the subject-matter via microphone. There was scant time to screen and train every presenter. Candidates were profiled ahead of time, sometimes covertly, searching for the crucial quality Darrow felt necessary to connect with listeners- enthusiasm. Natural enthusiasm was far more valuable than delivery technique or subject-matter organization.

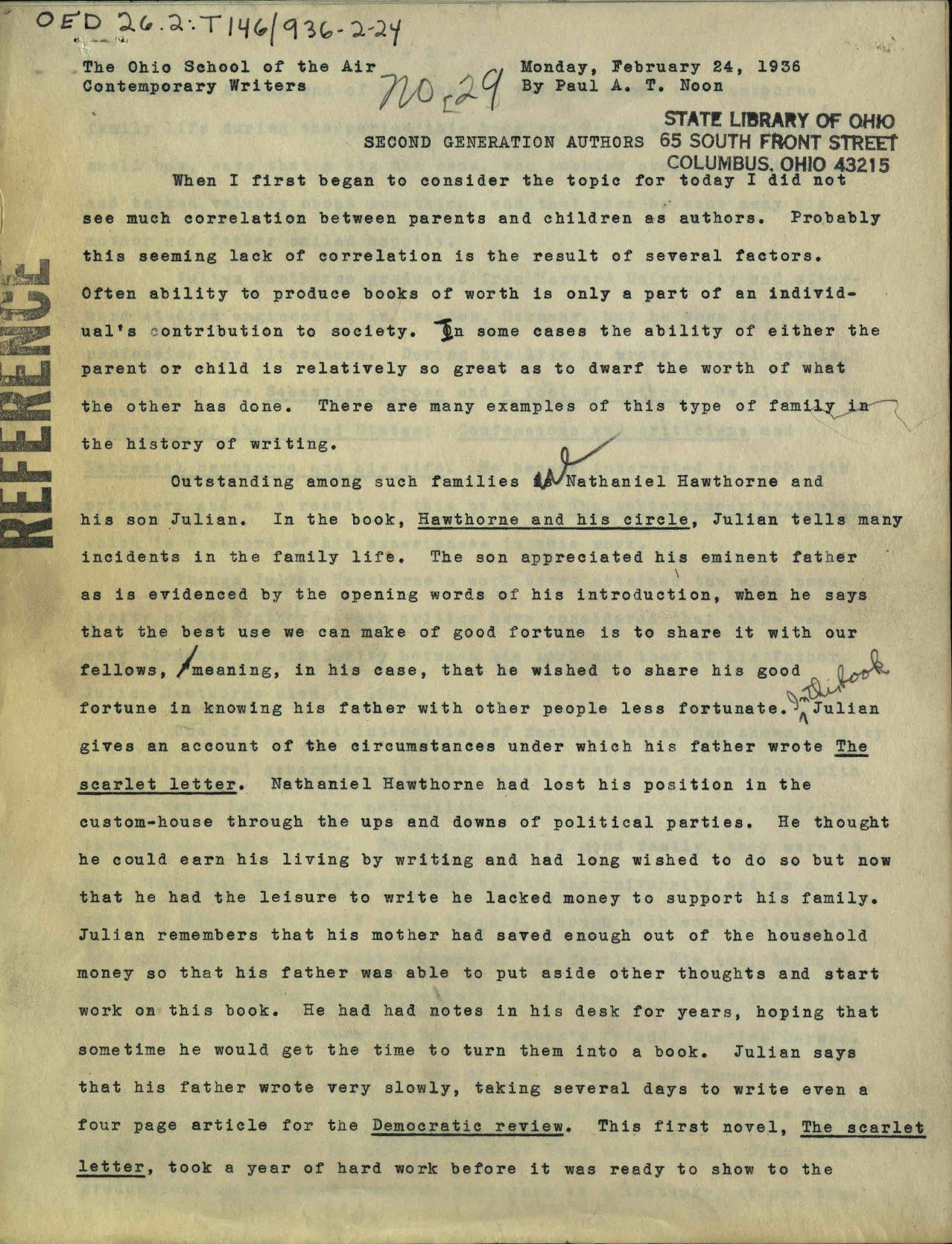
Paul A. T. Noon's 1936 program script for Contemporary Writers: Second Generation Authors

Presenting lessons over the radio required attention to the speaker's voice cadence. Without visual cues available to classroom teachers, radio's delivery via microphone had to maintain students' concentration with a message. Content had to be thoroughly memorized, lest pauses ensue that distract the audience. Scripts had to be written, practiced, rewritten and rehearsed until delivery was spontaneous, a process evidenced by markups on the accompanying 1936 Contemporary Writers program script.

One OSOA experiment assessed sentence complexity, concluding vocabulary used for young children's audiences should not have more than "one hard word for every hundred different words.” Benjamin Darrow had one simple rule in preparing radio scripts: “If in doubt, take it out.” OSOA's educational programming integrated at least three different pedagogical methods in lesson structure and delivery techniques.

Distribution of program guides and schedules was planned to align classroom preparations with program broadcasts. Teachers were an express target of lesson leaflets, attempting to develop their closest possible cooperation with program presentations. While OSOA provided teachers with lesson books and suggested visual props, teachers received little support from their schools. Jarvis argued that teachers and school administrators needed to become more interested and involved with the implementation and improvement of educational radio, or else students "will be seriously harmed by their haphazard use."

Darrow believed that many promotional ideas failed because they didn't develop "a presence". To ensure success he spent considerable efforts promoting OSOA to the media, generating national publicity from articles like "Ohio School of Air" Brings World to Little Red School House, and others. OSOA support was requested from many public institutions, receiving co-operation from groups such as The Ohio Congress of Parent-Teacher Associations (Ohio PTA) and the Ohio Federation of Women's Clubs (GFWC Ohio).

In 1930, OSOA's expenses to educate Ohio's 300,000 pupils cost the State of Ohio ~0.00041 cents per student-year.

During the 1936–37 school year OSOA needed a staff of ~100 people for its weekly script preparation and program presentations. In April 1936 governor Bowsher requested a field survey of OSOA's performance. A questionnaire was broadcast to home user's without forewarning, generating responses from the >75,000 audience who "demanded that the School of Air not only be continued but strengthened".

OSU received technical responsibility for OSOA in 1937; planning and operation during the transition was managed by WOSU's program supervisor, Ann Charles. Margaret Tyler joined OSOA in 1939 as its script supervisor. The Bureau of Educational Research's Radio Division gave OSOA special attention that year, assisting in program planning and evaluation; and producing program scripts. A 1940-41 survey by OSU's "Evaluation of School Broadcasts" staff found the most preferred OSOA programs for Grades 1-3 were "Music Time", followed by "Play Time" and "Story Time"; grades 4-6 preferred the "Our World Today", and "My Music" programs.

In preparation for the 1941–42 school year WOSU assigned Margaret Tyler as OSOA's dedicated supervisor. On July 1, 1945, OSOA's management was transferred from WOSU to OSU's College of Education and its Bureau of Educational Research, a symbiotic pairing recommended by the University's Committee on Radio Education.

During 1957-58 Ohio's K-12 public school system enrolled 23% (2,135,000 students) of the state's 9,230,000 age-eligible population. During 1935-36 19.2% (1,289,337) of Ohio's total school-age population was enrolled. OSOA's mission was to reinforce and enrich Ohio's existing curriculum. Audience surveys demonstrated its usage rates:

- 1936: a survey estimated 75,000+ listening children, benefitting 5.8% of Ohio's 1936 student body.
- 1945: OSOA produced 256 programs for an ~381,320 student audience.
- 1954: 150,000+ Ohio school children listened to at least one of OSOA's programs.
- 1959: the student audience was estimated at 100,000+, based on school requests for OSOA's program guides and Teachers' Manuals.

A 1959 Bureau of Educational Research and Service study compared educational radio and educational television broadcasting. It concluded the two medias would co-exist, not compete, as each offered specific benefits over the other. Radio had an advantage over television with drama, literature, music and news broadcasts.

OSOA was operated by OSU's Bureau of Educational Research until at least 1960. By 1962 OSOA's management responsibility had been transferred to OSU's Telecommunications Center.

=== Program creation ===
OSOA initially broadcast 4 days per week; Monday and Tuesday's programs were created in WEAO's Columbus studio, Thursday and Friday's airings originated from WLW's Cincinnati studios. Educators had been surveyed to determine the desired school curriculum, guiding OSOA's initial program selections. Follow-up questionnaires rated lesson presentations and student impact, those responses guiding future program offerings.

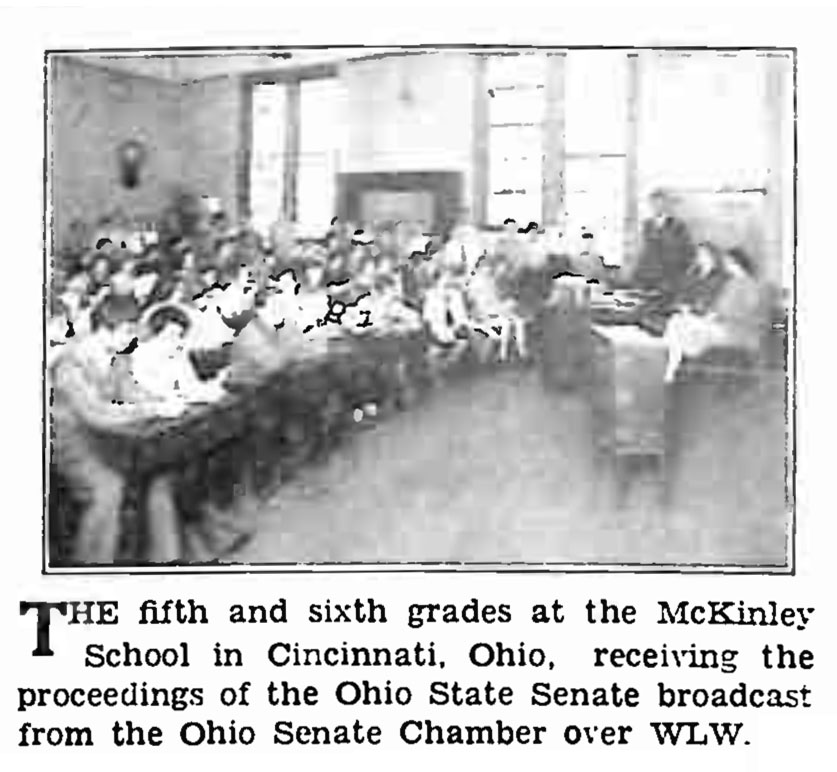
(Natalie Gibbings, 1929).

Formal scripts were not always used. OSOA's Civil Government programs included live broadcasts of state government operation, e.g., the January 14, 1929, inauguration of Myers Y. Cooper as Ohio State Governor and the March 12, 1929, airing of live Ohio Senate proceedings. Legislative discussions in the Ohio House of Representatives were also broadcast, all originating from the state capital building in Columbus. On November 11, 1929, Governor Cooper with John W. Bricker, former assistant Ohio Attorney General, and Dr. J. L. Clifton spoke during opening ceremonies of OSOA's Armistice Day school program.

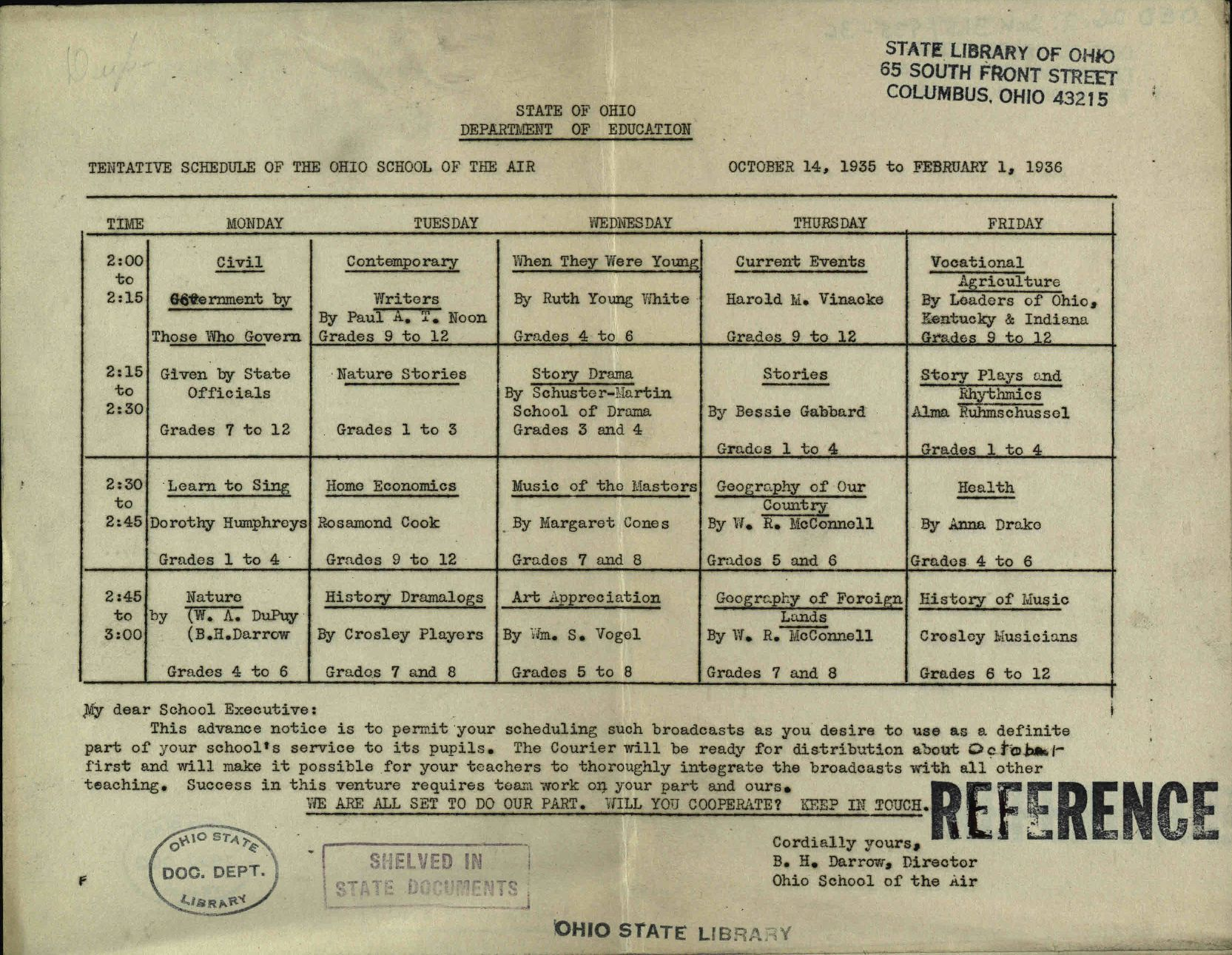
Tentative Schedule of The Ohio School of the Air, 1935-36

By 1935 OSOA was broadcasting a full week's schedule for grades 1-12 during a one-hour period each day. To coordinate broadcasts with class schedules OSOA sent broadcast plans to school administrators prior to schools' opening dates (see Tentative Schedule for 1935-36).

- During Darrow's prior "Little Schoolhouse of the Air" tenure he discovered young school students' affinity to hear like-aged voices, a technique frequently used in OSOA's programming.
  - In 1930 OSOA aired a nature study program designed and produced by students from Bellefontaine, Ohio.
  - In 1936 high school student discussion programs were introduced, the series receiving high audience acclaim.
  - During 1930-40's OSU's University School, OSU's K-12 teaching laboratory, created an unusual, unscripted elementary science program. Taught by their science teacher, University School students conducted experiments and demonstrations of each week's subject while he discussed the science issues. OSOA included these weekly 15-minute programs in its broadcasts.
  - School children at McGuffey School in Oxford, Ohio were live participants in the 1948-49 "Play Time" programs created by Miami University and broadcast by OSOA.
  - In 1953 fourteen-year-old radio speech class student, Lynn Preisler, was enlisted as the broadcast voice for "Boys and Girls in Bookland" and the "Storytime" programs.
  - During 1953-56 OSOA re-broadcast the St Louis Public Schools' "Let's Find Out" science series. School children were present during the series' recording, supplying enthusiastic background noises, albeit their voices occasionally muted when the teacher's questions were soliciting audible responses from the radio audience.
- During the 1935–1936 school year funding losses again affected OSOA's program creation as Ohio's legislature adjusted to lingering effects of Depression. During this period Payne Fund contributions and Roosevelt's stimulus efforts compensated and assisted with program development.
  - A FERA-employed work staff enabled OSOA to fulfill audience requests, adding a summer school program in 1935 which was broadcast by Columbus stations WCOL and WAIU.
  - The Payne Fund of New York funded a radio "work shop" to aid in development and refinement of OSOA's programming. Workshop management was assigned to the State Department of Education and OSU's Bureau of Educational Research.
  - Payne Fund aid was also given to the Ohio Wesleyan University to establish a radio workshop where they produced Shakespearian Dramas that were aired by OSOA.
  - OSU created a Radio Junior College where students spent volunteer time in the radio workshop refining OSOA's educational programs, whilst gaining practical experience.
  - Work Shop players (a troupe of dramatic actors) used the radio workshop to prepare and present OSOA's original "Men Who Made History" drama series. National Youth Administration (NYA) students wrote the program scripts about the country's leading history makers. During the 1936-37 session WLW presented the "Men Who Made History" series (later renamed "Men Who Made America") with those scripts produced in OSU's Radio Workshop.
  - With WPA support in 1936, OSOA partnered with the Federal Radio Workshop (FRW) to produce an educational series of Latin American travelogues for commercial radio use. The FRW hired out-of-work Ohio educators to produce scripts and dramatize schoolchildren versions of the programs that included Latin American history, geography and industry.
  - OSOA shared its program scripts with the WPA's Emergency Schools program who then developed and re-broadcast them to Cleveland public school children via multiple commercial radio stations in the city. OSOA's scripts were also shared internationally with a station in Peiping, China, where they were translated and re-broadcast.
- In 1936 two discussion series were added. A Round Table series was introduced, hosted by rotating invitational guests, e.g. a law professor, presenting to a high school student panel and discussing current problems. Keith Tyler, Bureau of Educational Research, hosted a high school student discussion program entitled "The High School Student Talks it Over". Topics covered issues impacting teachers, students and their parents. The series were presented without any cost to OSOA.
- On March 4, 1937, OSOA broadcast a centennial birthday tribute for Ohio's William Dean Howells, born on March 1, 1837, with an adventure-drama biography that was co-aired on NBC's Blue Network. This "Men Who Made America" episode, "The Dean Without a College", was developed by WLW and presented by the station's Crosley Players.
- OSOA's accumulated program script inventory minimized subsequent development time and expense. During the 1947–1948 school year OSOA broadcast ten program series with eight being repeats; only two needed development work at minimal expense to OSOA. The "Economic Detective" was produced by OSU's Department of Economics and the Columbus Philharmonic Orchestra's concert series was broadcast live from various school auditoriums and narrated by its conductor, Izler Solomon.
- WOSU was a National Association of Educational Broadcasters (NAEB) member and able to participate in their Tape Network program announced in 1952. A library of educational broadcasts, stored as magnetic-taped copies, was consignable to NAEB's 80+ radio station members. OSOA integrated Tape Network programs into its educational series later that year, re-broadcasting works from WTDS-FM (Toledo, Ohio), KSLH-FM (St Louis, Missouri), and KSL-AM (Salt Lake City, Utah); continuing until at least 1957–58 with programs from WNYE-FM (New York City).
- In 1953 OSOA took a leadership role conducting elementary school television learning experiments. The study was produced by the Ohio Department of Education and three OSU College of Education groups: the Bureau of Educational Research, OSOA and the School of Fine and Applied Arts. Public school liaison teachers helped develop the art workshop program. OSOA partnered with Columbus' WTVN-TV station broadcasting two test lessons, "The Art Workshop of the Air" and "Science around Us". Up to 100 Columbus area control group classrooms watched the programs with Stanford Science Achievement Tests assessing benefits of television versus radio. Positive results enabled a 1958 3-year follow-up experiment across the full Columbus Public School system, conducted by OSU and sponsored by the Fund for the Advancement of Education. Subsequently, OSU's Telecommunications Center developed hundreds of weekly-series programs per month during the 1963–64 school year.
- During the 1954–55 school year OSOA broadcast 9 program series, four being sourced from other radio stations. Two were rented via NAEB's Tape Network program; one was re-broadcast from station WABE (FM) (Atlanta, Georgia); and one obtained through a station-to-station exchange between OSOA and Toledo's WTDS-FM.
- OSOA's "Ohio Today" segment featured Ohio native Roy Rogers, his dramatized biography "Roy Rogers, King of the Cowboys" broadcast on April 22, 1958, co-aired by 12 radio stations across Ohio.

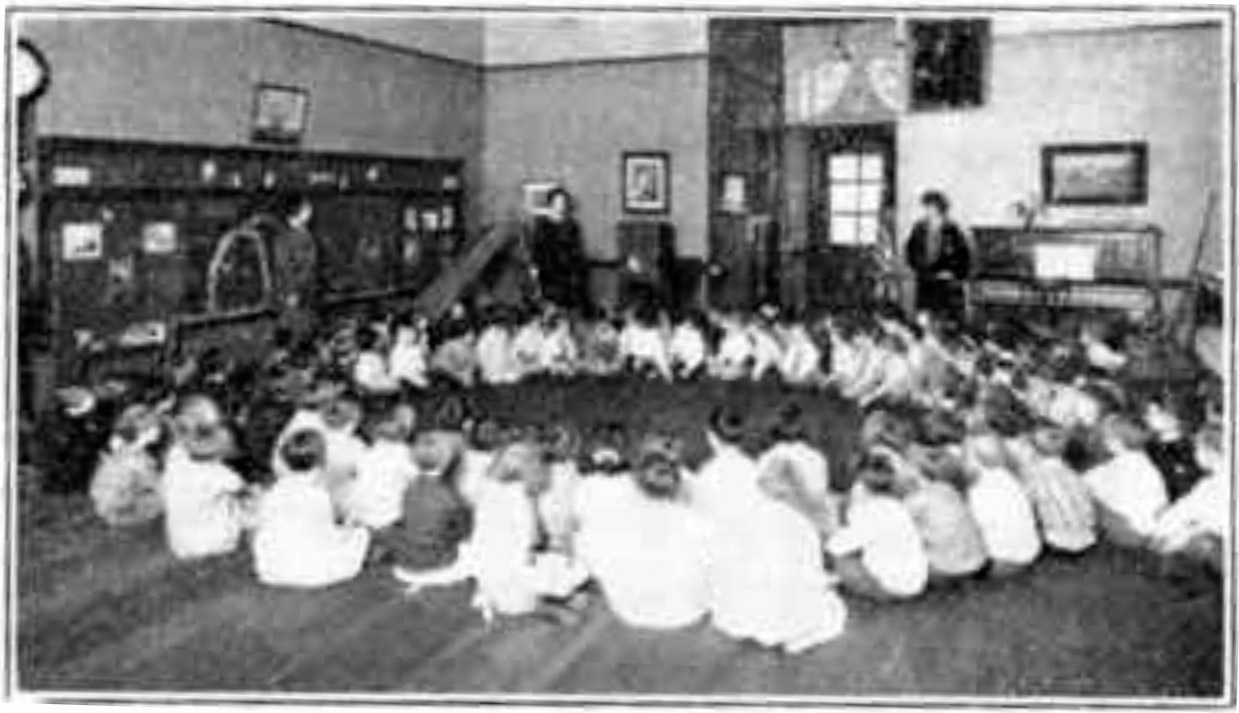
1929 McKinley School (Cincinnati, Ohio) kindergartners and 1st graders listening to an Ohio School of the Air program, broadcast from station WLW (Natalie Gibbings, 1929).

OSOA's Educational Broadcasting Stations
School Year	WEAO AM	WOSU AM	WOSU FM	WOSU TV	WLW AM	W8XAL S/W	NAEB Donor Station	Ref.
1929–30	X				X			
1930–31	X				X			
1931–32	X				X	X		
1937–38		X			X			
1940–41		X						
1948–49		X						
1952–53		X	X				WTDS-FM	
1953–54		X	X				WTDS-FM; KSLH-FM; KSL (AM)	
1954–55		X	X	X			WFBE-FM; KSLH-FM	
1955–56		X	X				WFBE; KSL (AM)	
1956–57		X	X				WNYE-FM; KSLH-FM	
1957–58		X	X				WNYE-FM	
1959–60		X	X					
1962–63		X	X					
1963–64		X	X	X				

=== Transmission and broadcasting ===
- Simulcasts were conducted from stations WLW and WEAO for OSOA's inaugural broadcast, enabled via land-wire telephone linkage between the two studios during portions of each week. The audience estimate for OSOA's January 7, 1929, inaugural broadcast was 200,000+ students from 600 schools, assembled into classrooms and auditoriums for the event. Audience size later grew as at-home family members enjoyed listening in via radio.
- In 1930 the government sponsored Wilbur Committee reported OSOA's broadcasts had been used in schools from twenty-nine States. Darrow reported to news outlets that school systems in 346 towns and cities from over 20 states had contacted OSOA registering for its supplemental programming materials.
- On September 1, 1933, OSU's radio station application for custom call letters was granted; OSOA's Columbus broadcast station transitioned from WEAO to WOSU.
- The Ohio Legislature's 1934-35 budget cuts impacted OSOA's simulcasting. AT&T's leased circuit between Columbus and Cincinnati had cost ~ $6,000 annually and was no longer affordable. That physical link was replaced by special radio receivers placed outside the city to capture WOSU's broadcasts, those signals then routed into WLW's studio where the station operated as a radio repeater. A loss of voice quality was introduced, but no alternative existed.
- In 1936 OSOA's programming was being re-broadcast by a network of 38 stations enabling reception across the mid-west with coverage reaching the USA's north–south borders. Programming was aired by commercial stations in cities across Ohio and by stations in Indiana, Kentucky, Tennessee, Georgia, Texas and Colorado. This period provided OSOA's "greatest area of coverage" with a nationwide audience estimated as high as 400,000 classroom children. Ohio's audience was estimated greater than 75,000 listeners based on responses to an April 6, 1936 broadcast poll, a survey requested by the State governor.
- By 1937, following a series of transmitter upgrades, WOSU's broadcast power reached 1000 watts and thought sufficient to enable reception in all 88 Ohio counties. The station received affirming messages from listeners in nearby States (Kentucky, Indiana, Michigan and Pennsylvania); and from Ontario, Canada. The quest for additional power still remained however, as WOSU had applied to the FCC and been licensed to use 5,000 watts during daylight hours in 1941. In 1949 it was reported that two counties, Hocking and Vinton, were still without reliable reception, measuring below secondary coverage of WOSU's broadcasting.
- OSU's OSOA broadcasts from Columbus' station WOSU were routinely carried by other stations. During the 1940–1941 school year select programs were primarily re-broadcast by Ohio stations in Akron, Cleveland, Toledo and Zanesville. An OSOA survey request mailed that year to its companion Teachers' Manual user list assessed topic popularity, secondarily providing minimum audience estimates of 11,000 students from those responses.
- In 1957 twelve Ohio city-based stations were re-broadcasting OSOA's Columbus programming, e.g. from locations southward in Jackson and Portsmouth; westward in Hamilton, Fremont and Toledo; and eastward in Elyria, Akron and Canton.
- A re-evaluation of OSOA's performance was conducted in 1959. Poor radio reception was identified as the largest deterrent to further adoption.

=== Publications ===
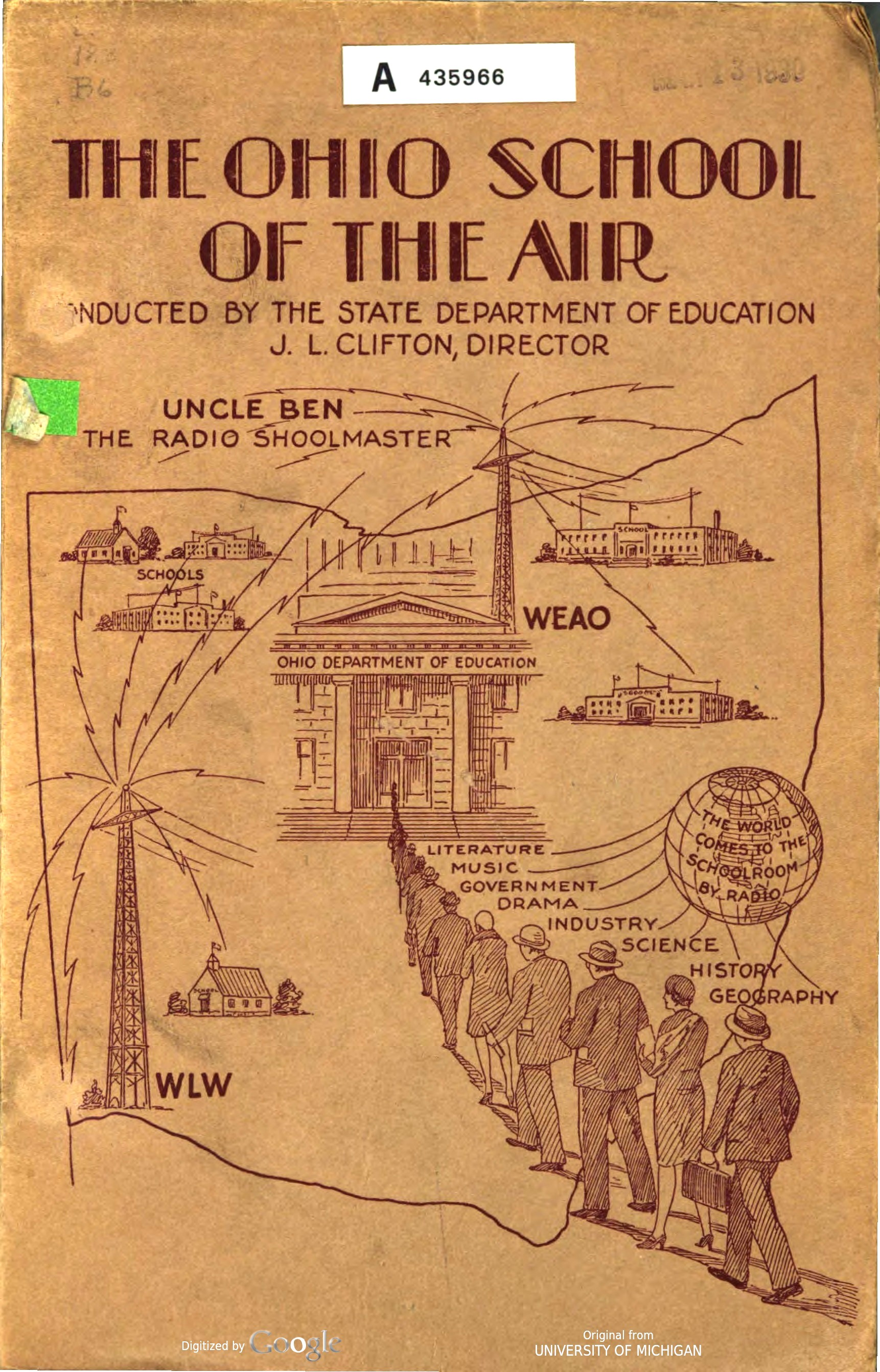
OSOA's 1929-1930 Courier, Vol I, a 270-page booklet with course descriptions and schedules.

The Courier, a scheduled program listing and teachers' preparation guide, was routinely sent to school administrators and teachers in the September preceding the school year, e.g. The Ohio School of the Air Courier, Vol I. Updates to the broadcast schedule were communicated via revisions, e.g. Ohio School of the Air Courier, Vol II, No. 4, and Ohio School of the Air Courier, Vol III, No. 5. Eight volumes of the Courier were published, the program guide available from 1929 through the 1936–37 school year.

In addition to the Courier, monthly lesson leaflets were also sent to teachers, supplementing courses and detailing exact upcoming program times to help integrate OSOA's programming with regular classroom instruction. During the first few months of broadcasting OSOA failed to provide accompanying lesson leaflets to students and teachers, though was able to provide mimeographed program schedules. By mid-year program schedules and individual lesson leaflets were available for all listening schools, for their parents at home and for any other interested listeners enjoying the educational broadcasts. Feedback via numerous parents' letters indicated OSOA's educational programs inspired the entire family's evening discussions. By early 1930 monthly lesson bulletins were being received by 5,000+ teachers and Courier circulation quickly grew to 12,000, mailed to listeners free of charge.

In August 1935 E.L. Bowsher succeeded B.O. Skinner as State Director of Education. The state governor requested his new management team reassess the School of the Air's utility. OSOA was prioritized to prepare such reports, putting preparations for the 1935-36 schoolyear on hold, delaying the Courier's publication. The schedules eventually reached school administrators, though so late school classroom plans had been made without using any OSOA broadcasts, making that schoolyear one of OSOA's least successful.

Fee assessments for the The Courier and the subsequent Teachers' Manual publications varied. During 1929-31 The Courier was sent freely to teachers around the state, intended to increase classroom usage and the number of listening students. Beginning in 1932 a subscription fee was levied to provide additional OSOA income. For the 1936-37 schoolyear the Courier was again offered free by the State Director of Education, though the budget only supported printing of a few thousand copies. Subsequent copies were issued in mimeographed form and distributed monthly to align with the program broadcast schedule. This portioned delivery method noticeably reduced the number of listening schools. Under OSU management in 1938, Teachers' Manuals were introduced and initially distributed fee-free in mimeograph form; in 1949 they switched to printed booklets. In 1954 OSOA began charging for supplementary manuals to nullify publishing expenses. In 1958-59 the Bureau of Educational Research and Service financed Teachers' Manual expenses. The announcement nearly tripled the number of manual requests from the previous year, from 4,871 to 15,807.

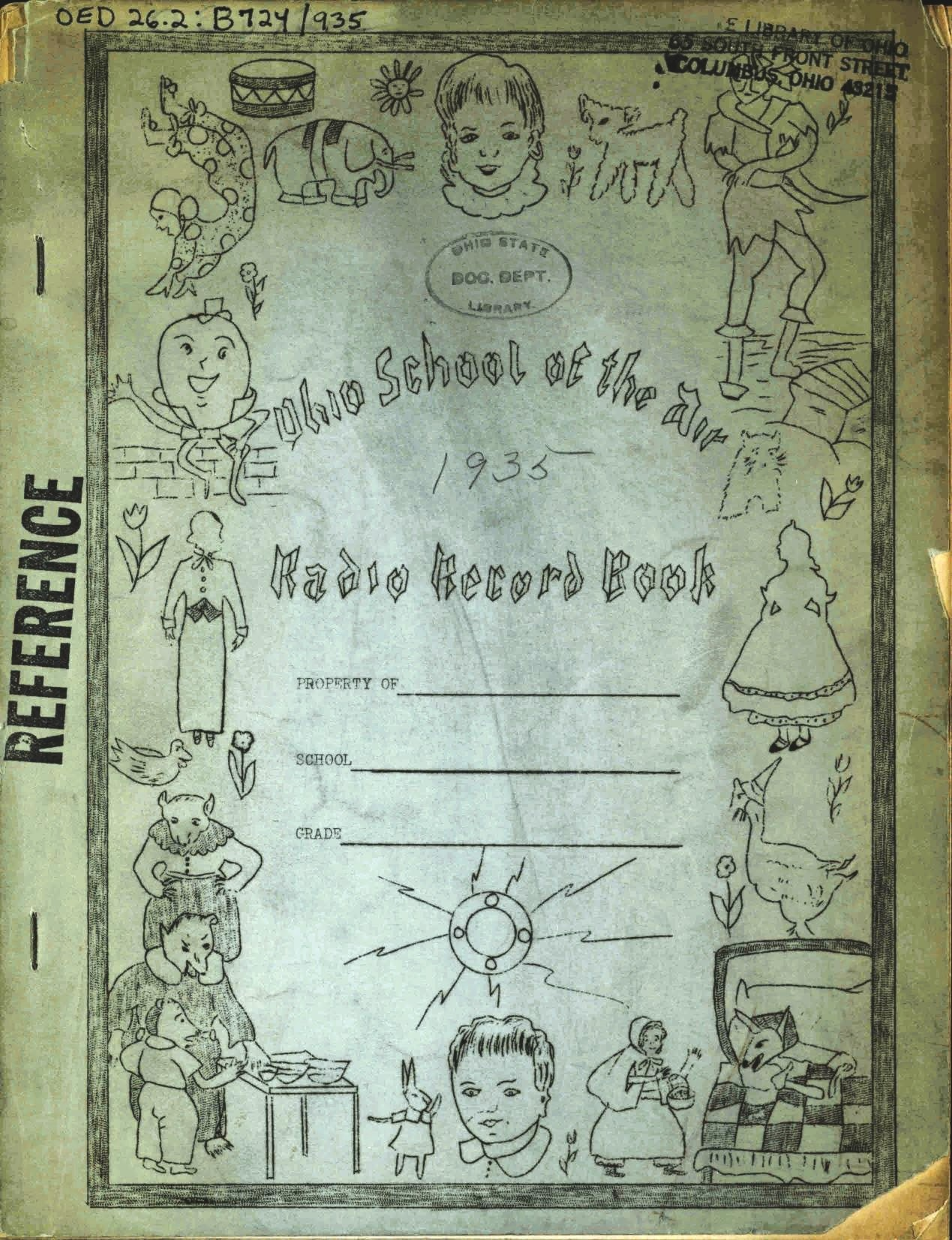
Ohio School of the Air: 1935 Radio Record Book (Pupil's workbook)

In 1935 the continuation of printed pupil's record books (workbooks) by the State Department of Education was discussed. The alternative of mimeographing a single program version, e.g. Story Plays, would cost OSOA over $1,200 without including mailing costs. The State Department's unwillingness to continue free distribution and OSOA's budget cut limitations brought future pupil's workbooks to an end.

Select OSOA publications spanning both operational phases:

- 1929-30: The Ohio School of the Air Courier, Vol. 1
- 1930-31: The Ohio School of the Air Courier, Vol. 2
- 1931-32: The Ohio School of the Air Courier, Vol. 3 Classroom broadcasts via WLW and W8XAL, Cincinnati; and WEAO, Columbus. Foreign language programs originated from WEAO.
- c.1937: Ohio School of the Air Radio Workshop Plays
- 1948-49: Ohio School of the Air Teachers' Manual- Play Time for the First, Second and Third Grades, the series, its scripts and teachers' manual prepared and conducted by McGuffey School, Miami University, Oxford, Ohio.
- 1952-54: Ohio School of the Air Teachers' Manual- Making Friends with Music, a two-year series of musical activities, produced by the Toledo Museum of Art. Premiere broadcasts originated from Toledo Board of Education's station WTDS-FM during the second year, then rebroadcast by OSOA.
- 1953-54:
  - Ohio School of the Air Teachers' Manual Let's Find Out, the series and manual prepared by KSLH-FM and St Louis Public Schools.
  - Ohio School of the Air Teachers' Manual Adventures in Folk Song (First Semester), Up and Down the Scales (Second Semester), prepared by the Junior Leagues of Columbus and Salt Lake City with the 2nd semester produced at Salt Lake City's station KSL (AM).
- 1954-55: Ohio School of the Air Teachers' Manual for Primary Grades- Play Time, Let's Find Out, Polly and Puffy, Story Time is a series of programs prepared by:
  - OSU's Department of Physical Education, Women's Division
  - Flint Board of Education and staff members of station WFBE, made available via the Tape Network program of the National Association of Educational Broadcasters (NAEB).
  - OSU's Department of Elementary Education
  - Saint Louis Public Schools' Elementary Radio Science Committee, station KSLH, available via the NAEB Tape Network.
- 1955-56:
  - The Tiptop Twins- a Series on Health and Safety with teachers' manual and broadcasts prepared and produced by the Public Schools of Flint, Michigan at station WFBE, available via the NAEB Tape Network.
  - Ohio School of the Air Teachers' Manual Let's Find Out- A Science Program for Grades 1-3 a series prepared and produced by station KSLH, St Louis Public Schools, available via the NAEB Tape Network.
- 1956-57:
  - Ohio School of the Air Teachers' Manual Once Upon A Time in Ohio, series and manual prepared by the Supervisor of Education, Ohio Historical Society.
  - Americans to Remember (first semester) Canadian Hearts and Minds (second semester) Teachers' manual with the 1st semester produced by New York City Schools and their station WNYE, available via the Tape Network; 2nd semester authored and by Canadian journalist David Watson with support from the Canadian Department of North Affairs and National Resources.
  - Just Why Stories- a Science Series for Primary Grades with teacher's manual prepared by the Elementary Science Radio Planning Committee of the Saint Louis Public Schools, broadcast by KSLH and available via NAEB's Tape Network.
- 1956-62: Music activity for the lower grades from 1956 through 1962, a series planned and produced by WNYE (FM), the radio station of the Board of Education, New York City.
- 1957-58: Ohio School of the Air Teachers' Manual Hands Across the World, written and produced by WNYE-FM, Board of Education, New York City and distributed by the NAEB.
- 1959-60: Ohio School of the Air Teachers' Manual Boys and Girls in Bookland
- 1962-63:
  - Play Time- A Program of Physical Activity for the Primary Grades
  - Ohio School of the Air Teachers' Manual- A Program of Physical Activities for the First, Second and Third Grades, a series planned and conducted by OSU's Women's Physical Education Department.
- 1963-64 Ohio School of the Air- WOSU Program Bulletin, OSOA's broadcasts were made on WOSU-AM, WOSU-FM with selected audio-visual programs debuting on WOSU-TV.
- 1968-1969 Ohio School of the Air- Program Bulletin, the last schoolyear Bulletin stored in OSOA's archives.

== OSOA's closures ==
OSOA's first phase was an acknowledged experiment in radio education, conducted by the Ohio State Department of Education and operated for 8 years and 9 months. It was the longest and most active classroom broadcasting program of any State education department in the country. Its programs were heard in 22 states by more than 100,000 listeners. The first phase operated until June 1, 1937, when State legislature funding expired, then received a continuance by the governor to allow OSU's preparation for the second phase of operation. While some published articles indicate OSOA "disbanded in 1937" (Lamb, 2012), OSOA operated throughout the 1937–38 school year and received subsequent Ohio Legislative funding to initiate its 1938–39 school year as an Ohio State University entity.

WOSU's partner station WLW withdrew from OSOA's programing in the Spring of 1937 and introduced a self-produced version of the program, renamed the "Nation's School of the Air" sponsored by the Crosley Radio Corporation. Joseph Ries, Darrow's successor as station WLW's educational director, with staff of five produced their version until WLW joined the National Broadcasting Company (NBC) radio network in 1939.

Operational artifacts of OSOA's 1929–1937 experimental phase are archived at OSU's Special Collections Registry, Columbus. Contents include administrative records; audiovisual materials; scrapbooks; and broadcast program scripts in both written and audible form, i.e., phonograph records and magnetic audio tape copies.

In March 1938, after the lapse of the 1937–38 schoolyear, the State approved OSU's budget request to resume OSOA activity. The Ohio legislature authorized $13,000 for OSOA's second phase of operation, beginning July 31, 1938, with operational responsibilities transferred to Ohio State University, managed by Gordon G. Humbert. Educational programming continued through at least 1973, with OSOA's archives containing:

- program scripts for the 1969–70 school year
- 1971-72's Massey Lectures featuring the February 15 broadcast of Dr. George Wald's "Therefore Choose Life"
- the "And the Walls Came Tumbling Down" script for 1972-73

OSOA's ultimate closure was attributed to multiple causes:

- Acceptance issues with school staff and student boredom
- Integration issues between programming times and schools' schedules
- Quality of the presenting talent
- Technical issues with reception and audio quality
- The invention of television
- Funding reductions, with potential retribution issues between Governor Martin Davey and Darrow

== Accolades and Diatribes ==
=== Comments about Ohio School of the Air ===
- In the Spring of 1929, just months after its initial broadcast, OSOA's state-wide acceptance was so prominent that surrounding midwestern states Kentucky, Michigan, Indiana and further to Nebraska had begun parent-teacher discussions hoping to mimic Ohio's success using radio instruction in their school systems.
- By February 1930, Indianapolis had introduced radio instruction into ~35 of its public schools, listening to OSOA daily as well as programs from Damrosch's Music Appreciation Hour and The American School of the Air. Indianapolis' adoption of radio assisted education was not without controversy; radio was opposed by school board members. In compromise, nearly all of the radios in use were paid and installed by supporting Parent-Teacher Association efforts.
- In 1930 the Advisory Committee on Radio Education (the Wilber Committee) reported OSOA had provided one of the most successful examples of radio education to date, its broadcasts being used in the schools of twenty-nine States. OSOA was complimented for its effectiveness in classroom radio education, producing the highest successes seen to date in schools of the air, according to Harper’s Magazine (Vol 163, November 1931).
- In 1932 OSOA received acknowledgement for its successful radio-series on Art Appreciation, presented by William H. Vogel of Cincinnati.
- Primary schoolchildren in Greencastle, Indiana listened in via WLW and enjoyed OSOA's songs and stories celebrating Lincoln's birthday and Valentine's Day during February 1935.
- In recognition of the quality of OSOA's "Men Who Made History" series, on February 4, 1937, the NBC Blue Network began broadcasting the weekly series through its then 33-station network.
- During the 1937–38 schoolyear the McCartyville School, Shelby County, was using OSOA's programs as the primary curriculum source in its rural multi-grade school.
- In 1938 OSOA was considered to be the most carefully developed of all state-wide school broadcasting systems in the country by the Church of Christ's Department of Research and Educational.
- OSOA, along with The American School of the Air and Wisconsin School of the Air, were analyzed decades later, post-pandemic. These SOAs served as early remote learning models, all producing novel broadcasting programs for classroom or home use. OSOA was exemplified for offering special discussions on topics of interest to high school students, airing the series Men Who Made America and introducing students to literature via dramatic story readings. However, later analyses noted students receiving solely SOA-based education combined with (social) isolation reported less overall learning, problems getting special assistance, loss of relationships and degraded social-emotional health. Some of their peers did adapt however, acquiring new skills for self-reliance, time management and organization.
- Ultimately, OSOA's radio experiment was unable to alter the established form of education. A 1943 report by OSU's Bureau of Educational Research found that only a minority of the state's teachers had accepted radio education; radio was not viewed as a bona fide educational tool.

=== Comments about staff ===
- A 1931 Journal of Education article praised OSOA's B. H. Darrow for its 1929 State Governor's inauguration broadcast. Via radio, Darrow had given "a vivid picture of the maneuvers about the capital building", vitalizing and enriching the event for children in classrooms and their parents at home.
- The primary facilitator of OSOA's success was Benjamin H. Darrow, educational radio's "biggest proponent". He was one of the first to successfully develop educational radio.
- OSOA's success, attributed to its director's tireless efforts, ironically discouraged many educational departments from experimenting with radio programs.
- OSOA's choice of content and presenters was considered biased. Darrow's goal to provide uplifting themes and bring culture to the masses, e.g. poor and working-class children, was culturally biased toward upper-middle classes' version of success. Curriculum was chosen based on Darrow's selection of cultural groups to include or exclude. Presenters were commonly assigned based on gender, women leading the young children's activities, demonstrating typical early twentieth-century prejudices. In 1931 cultural bias was inherent in two OSOA programs recorded at the National Education Association's headquarters in Washington D.C.; presenters were all white, "US literary figures and politicians" espousing power, rank and privilege.

== Gallery ==
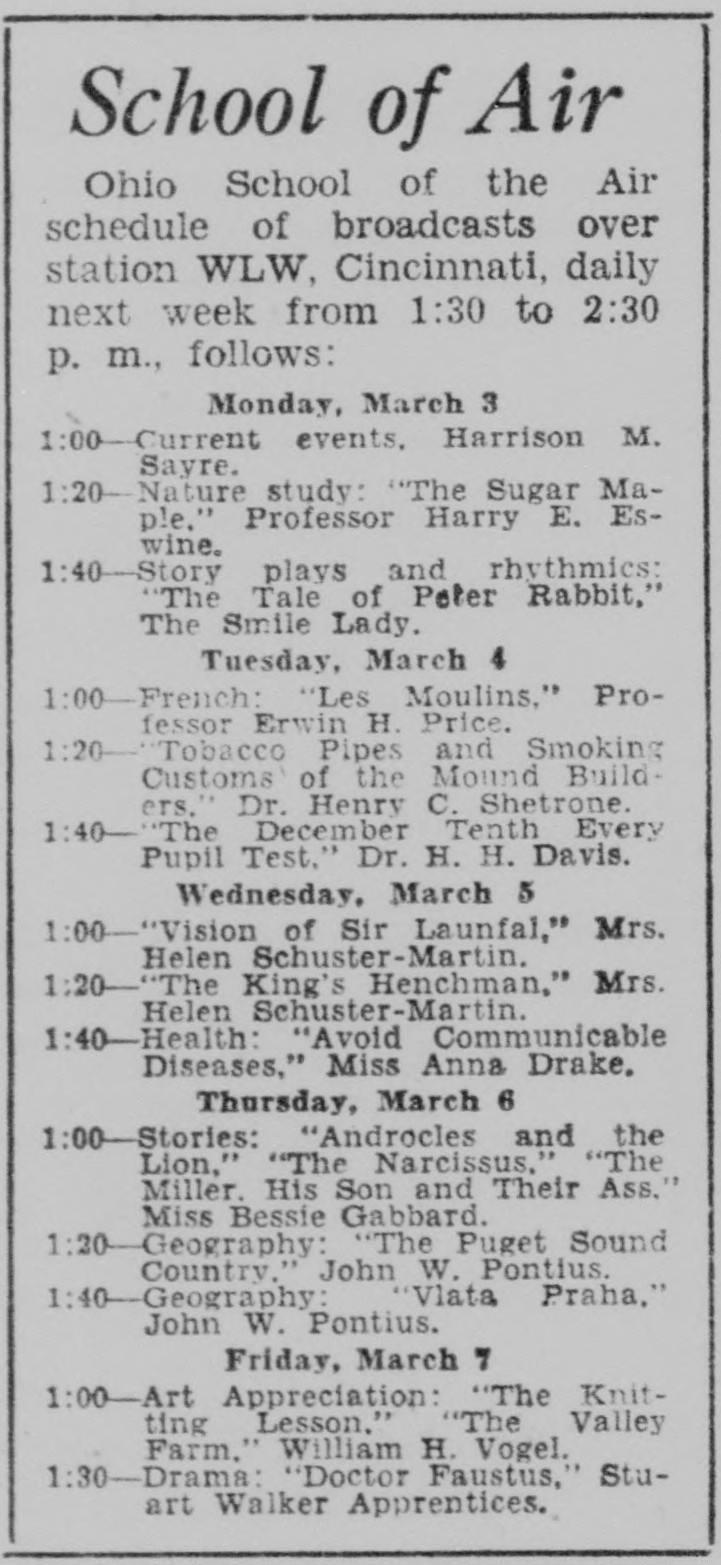
Ohio School of the Air's broadcast schedule for March 3–7, 1930.

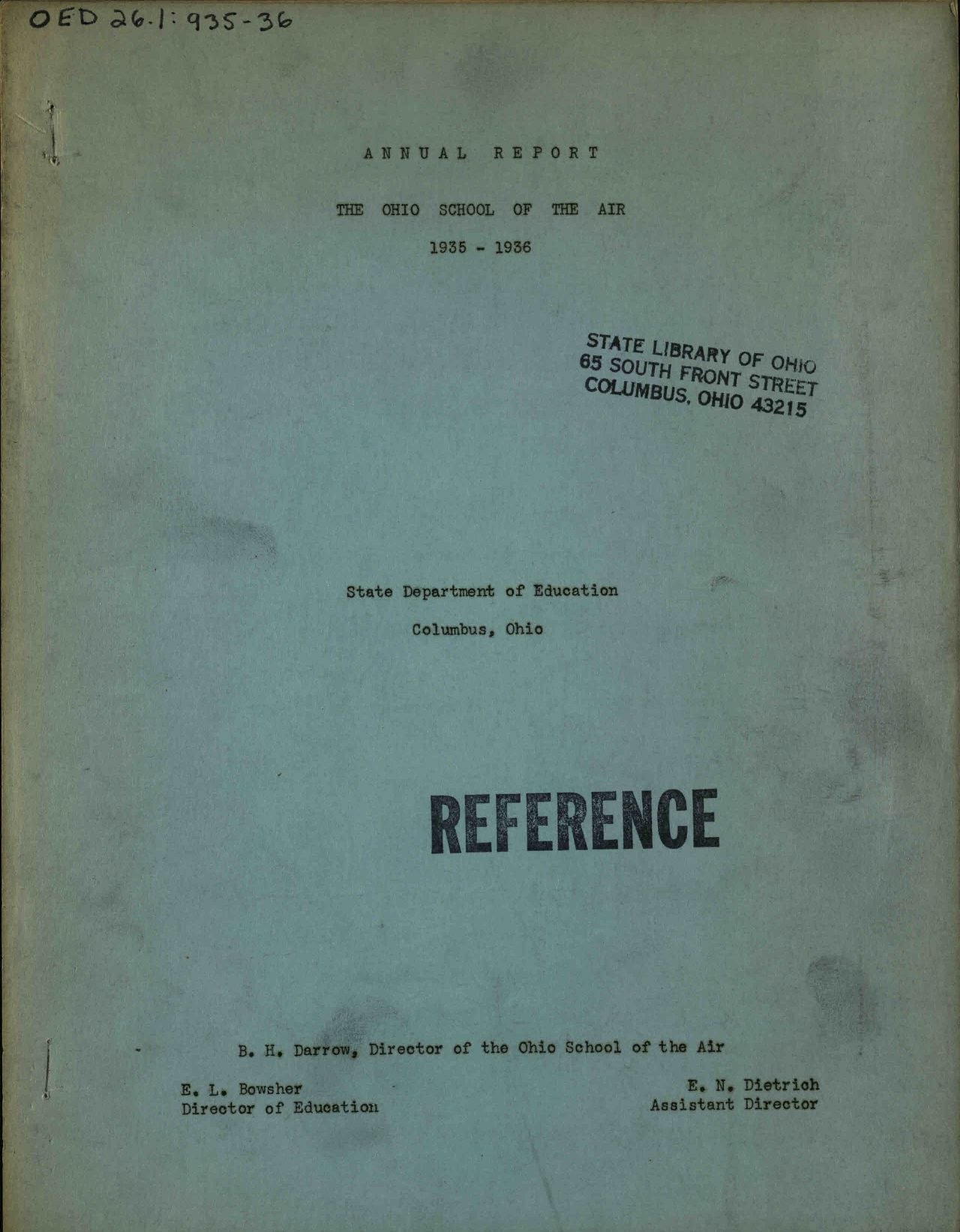
Annual Report Ohio School of the Air, 1935–36, by B. H. Darrow

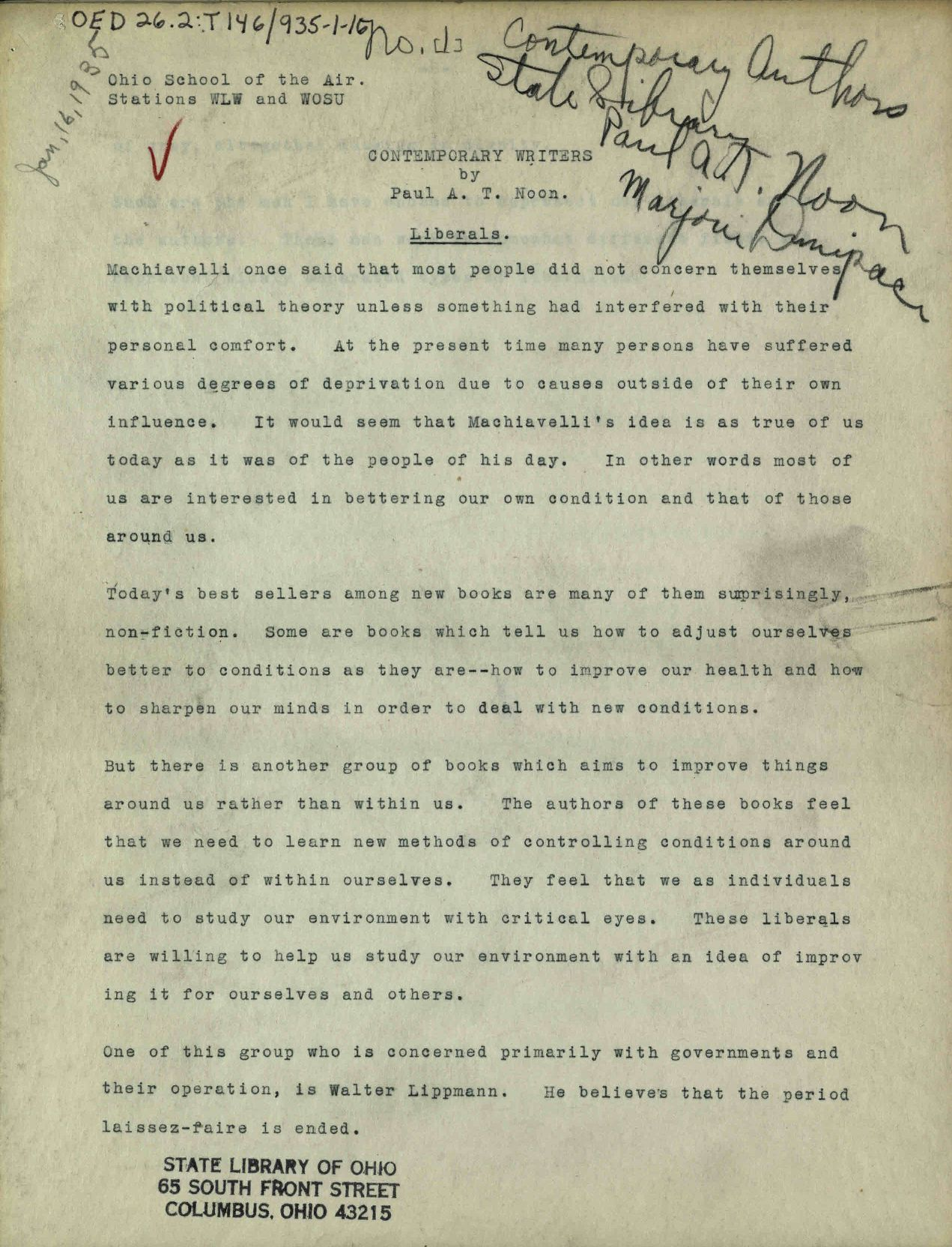
Ohio School of the Air program script: Contemporary Writers- Liberals; Jan 16, 1935; by Paul A. T. Noon

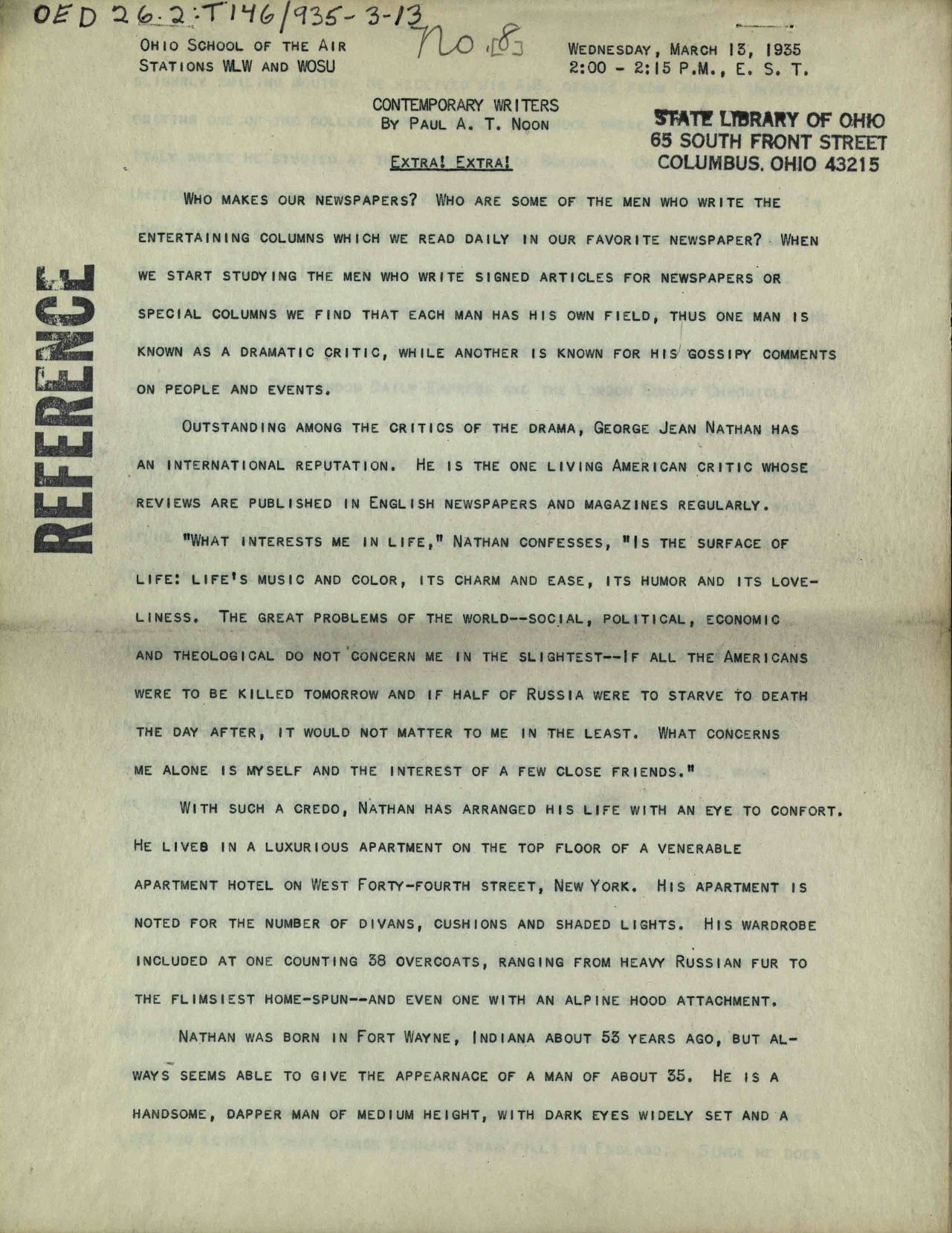
Ohio School of the Air program script: Contemporary Writers- Extra Extra!; March 13, 1935; by Paul A. T. Noon

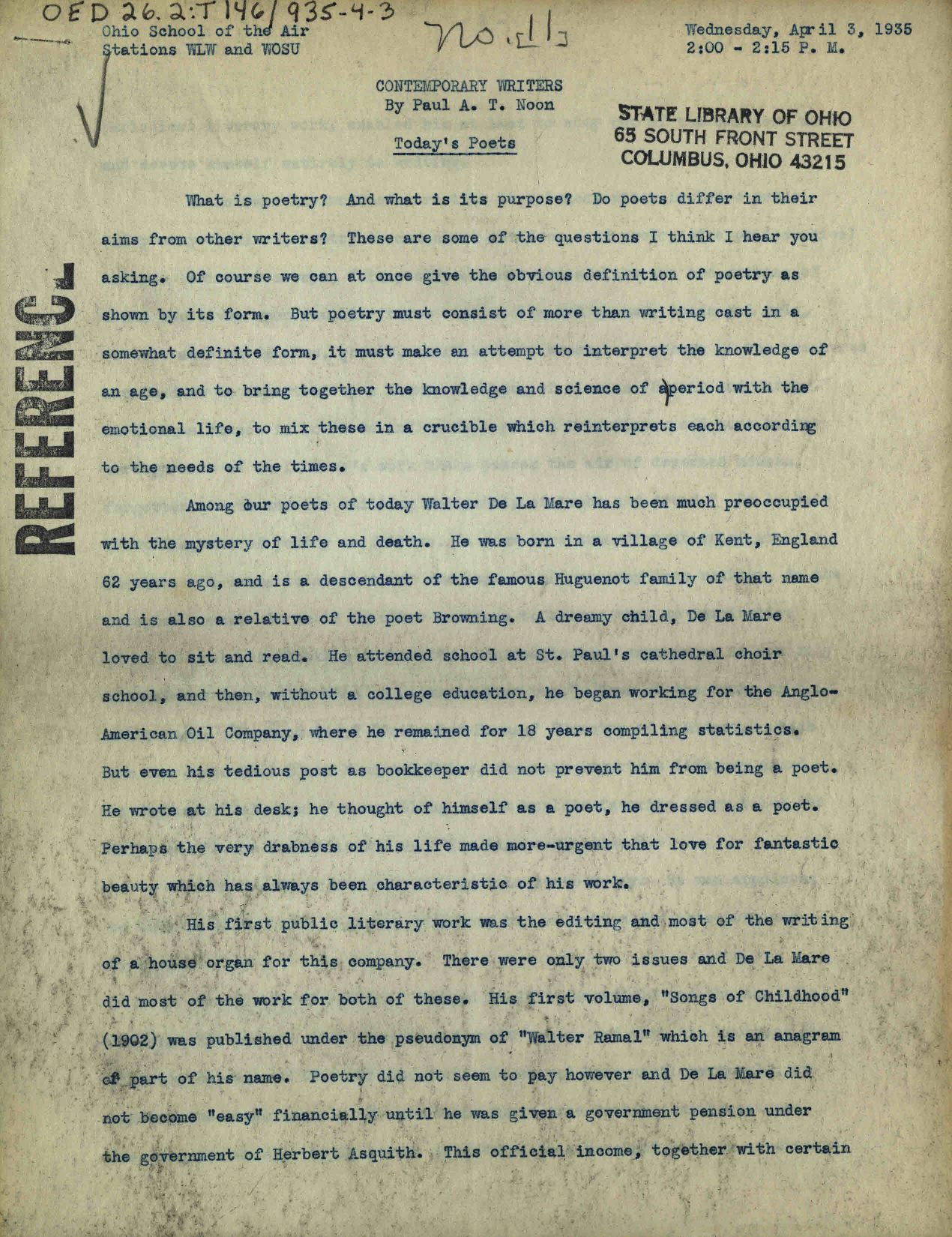
Ohio School of the Air program script: Contemporary Writers- Today's Posts; April 3, 1935; by Paul A. T. Noon

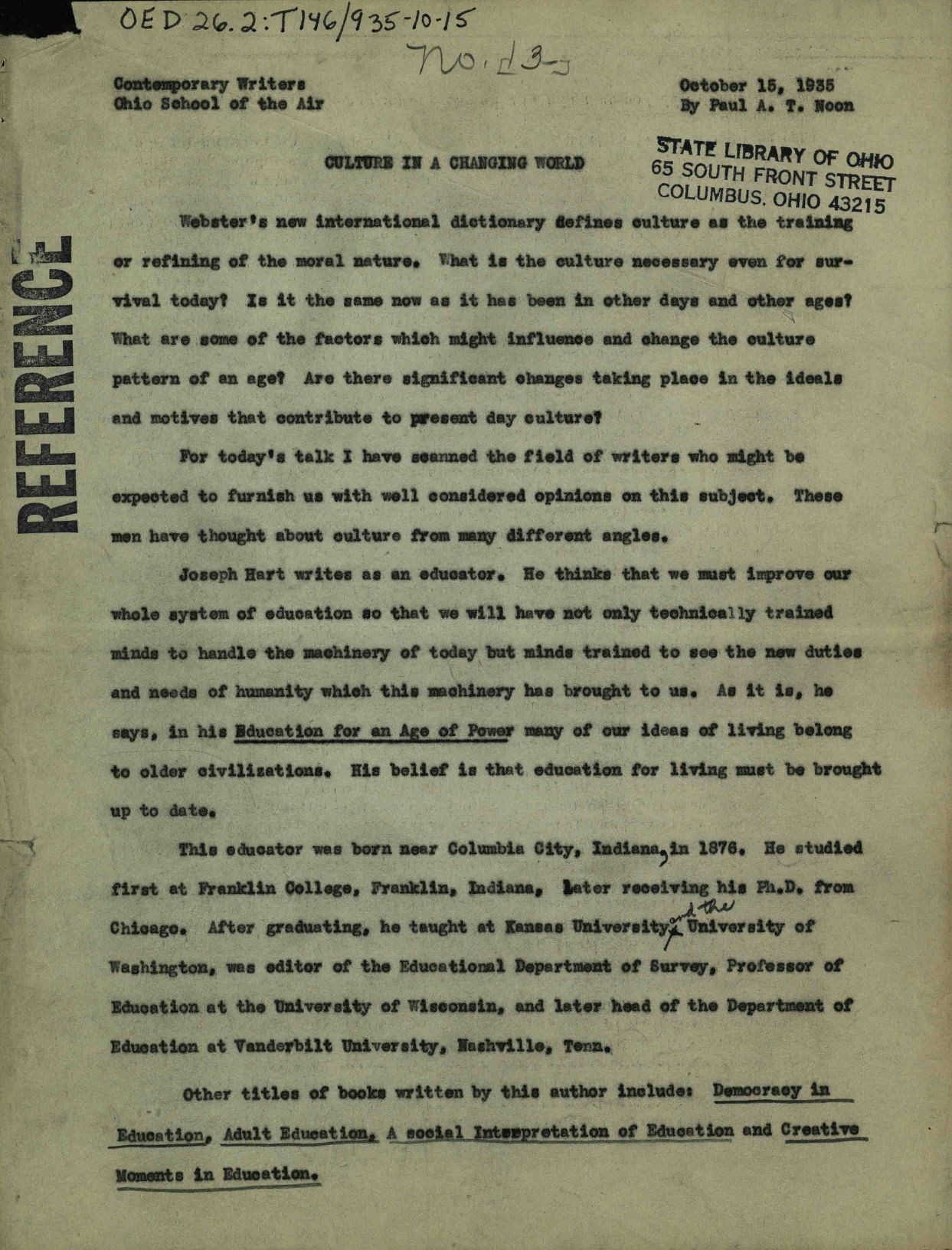
Ohio School of the Air program script: Contemporary Writers- Culture in a Changing World; October 15, 1935; by Paul A. T. Noon

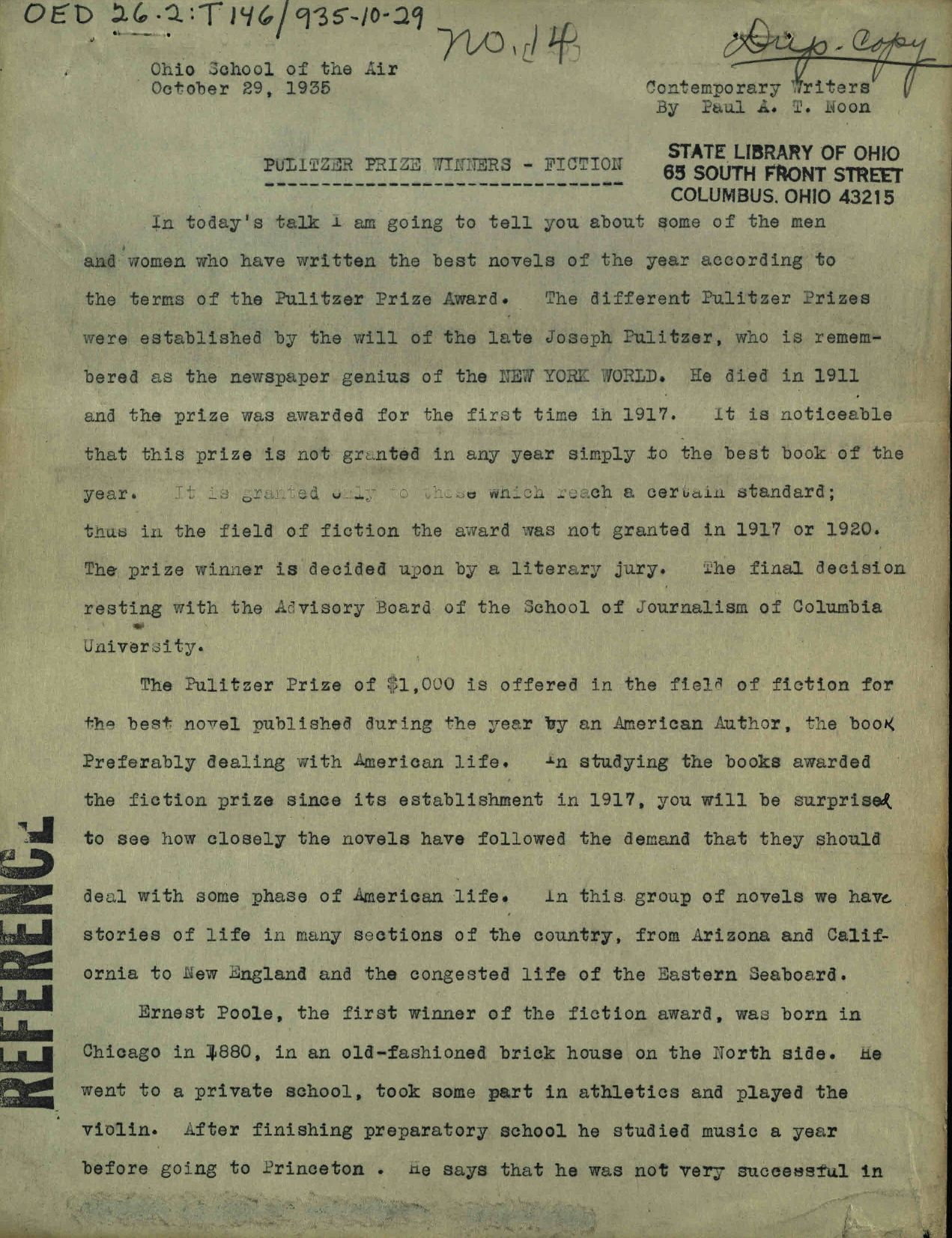
Ohio School of the Air program script: Contemporary Writers- Pulitizer Prize Winners; October 29, 1935; by Paul A. T. Noon

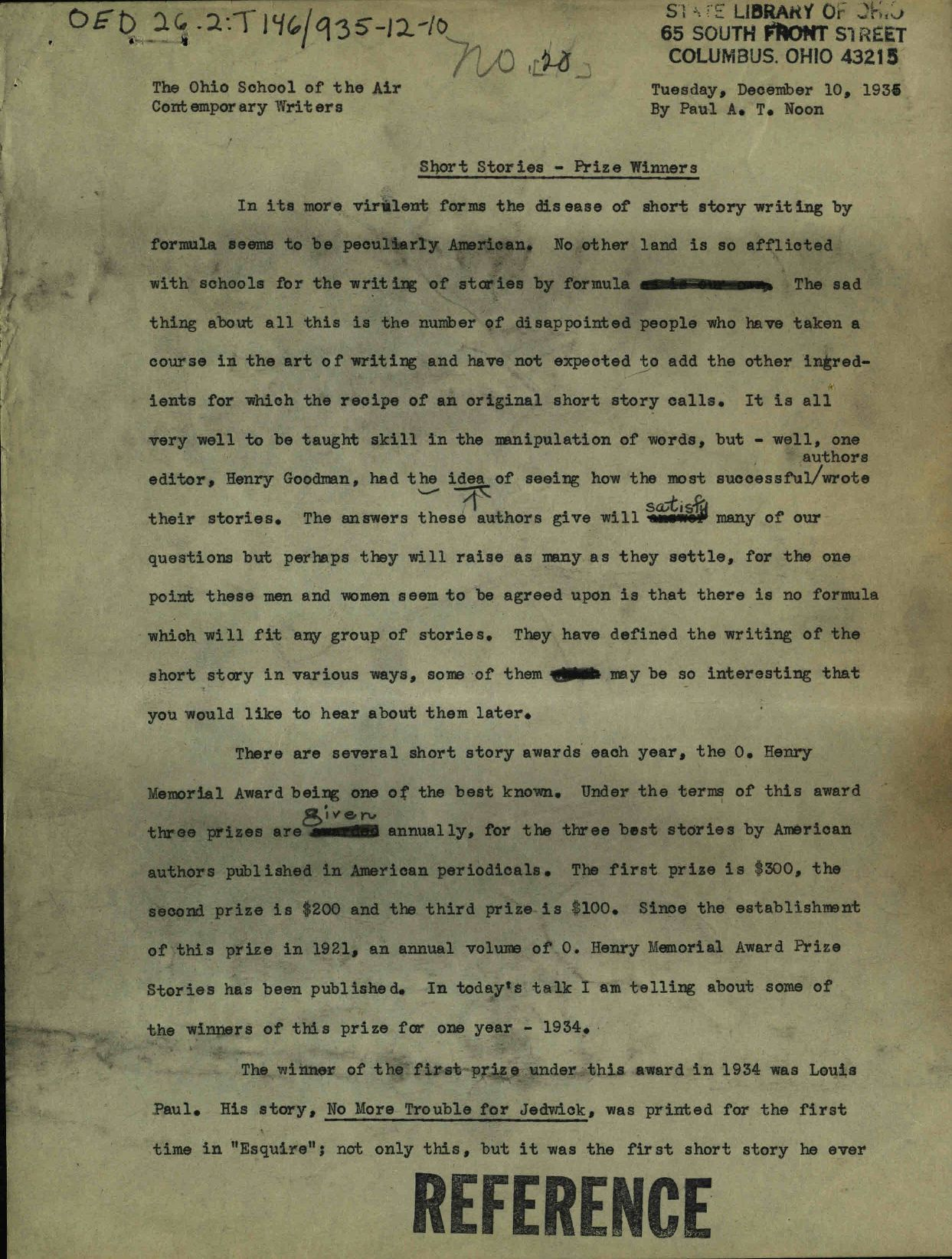
Ohio School of the Air program script: Contemporary Writers- Short Stories Prize Winners; December 10, 1935; by Paul A. T. Noon

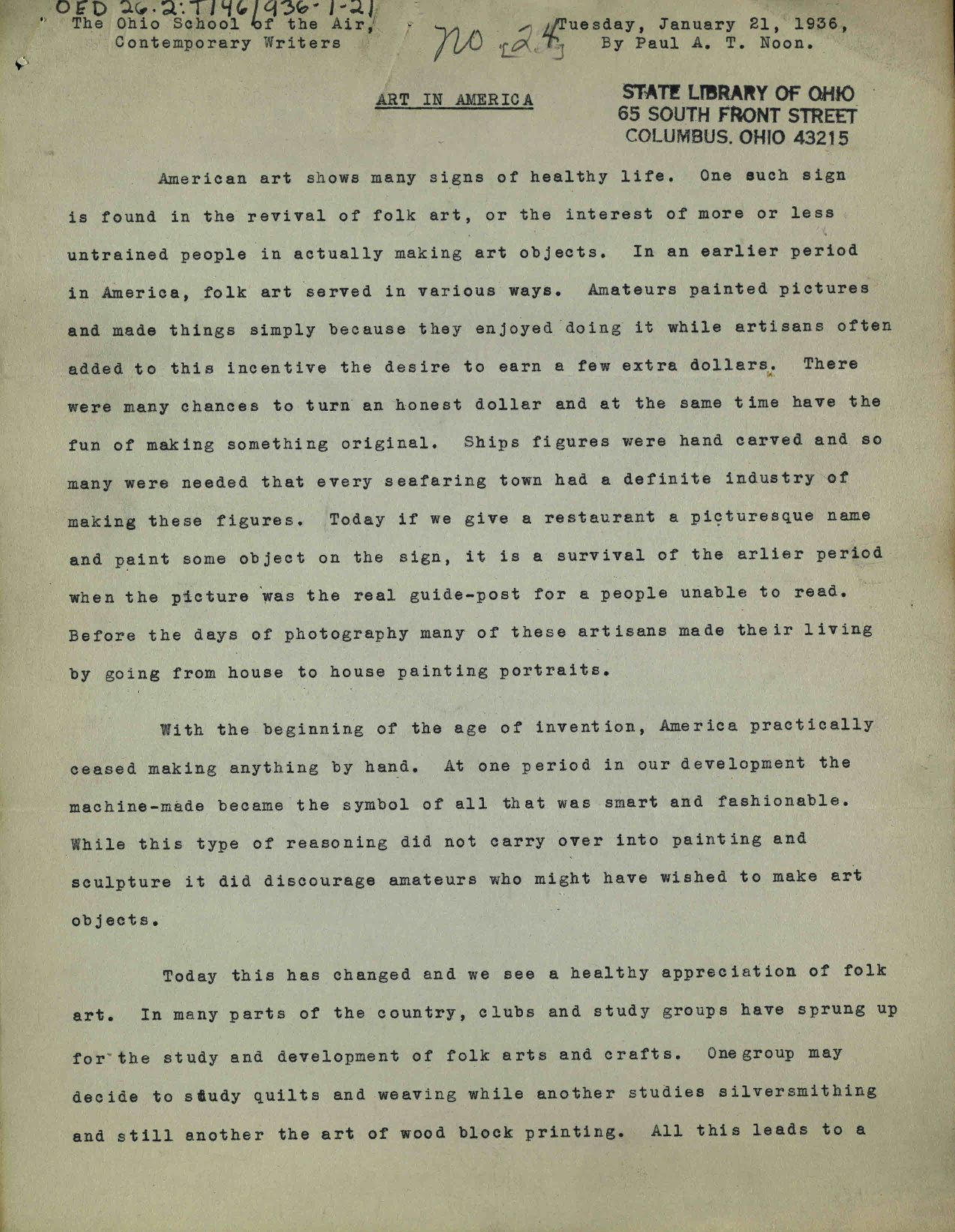
Ohio School of the Air program script: Contemporary Writers- Art in America; January 21, 1936; by Paul A. T. Noon

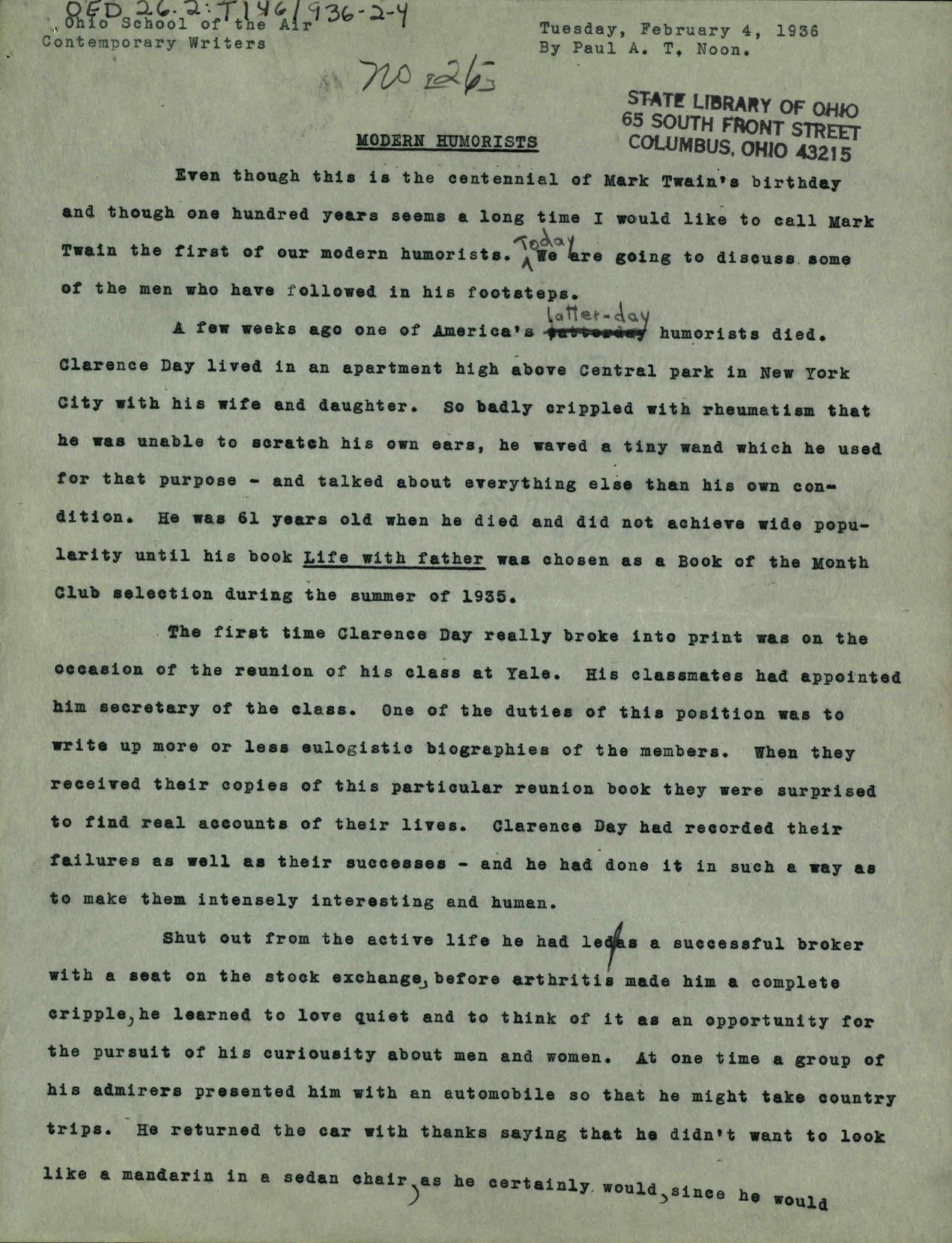
Ohio School of the Air program script: Contemporary Writers- Modern Humorists; February 4, 1936; by Paul A. T. Noon

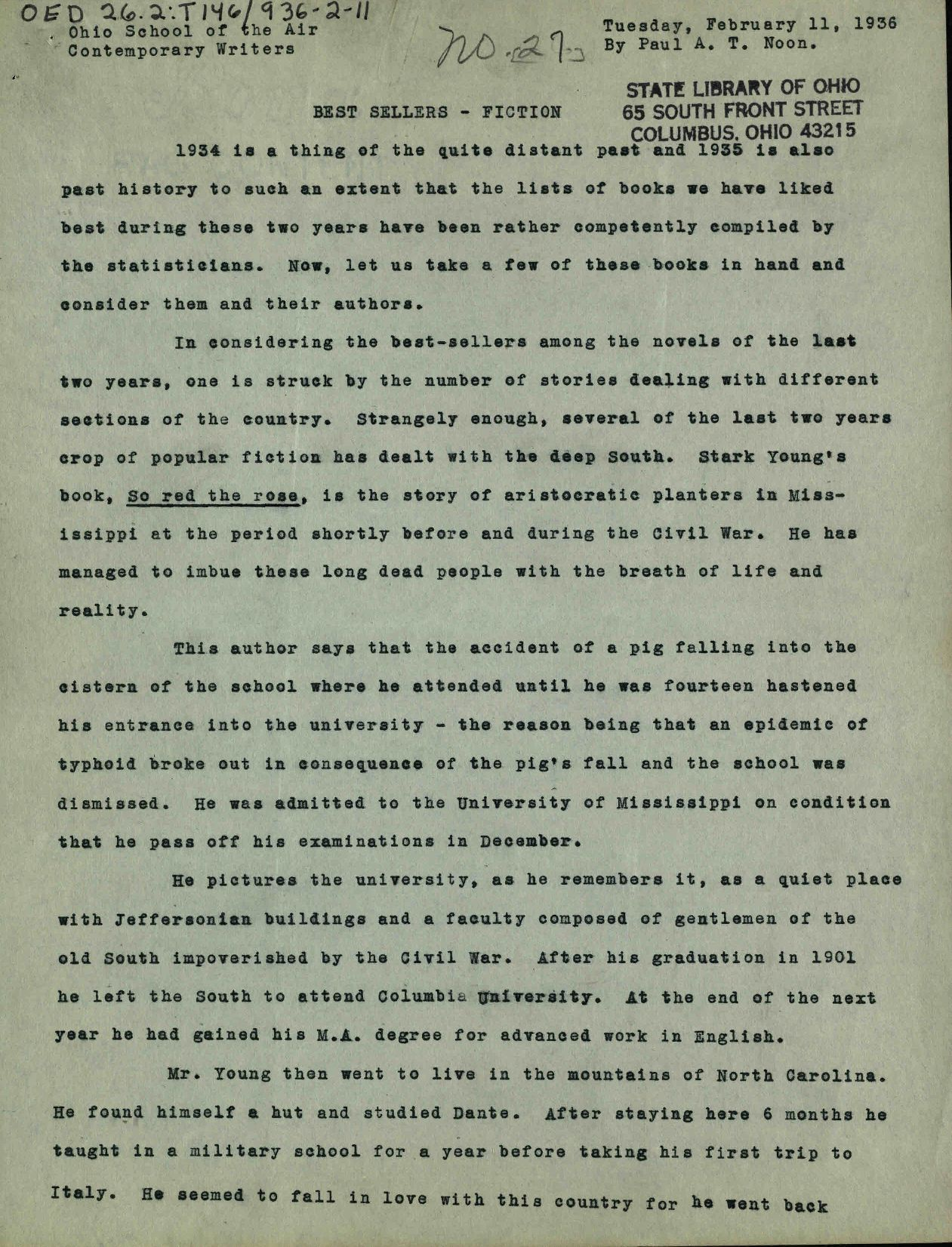
Ohio School of the Air program script: Contemporary Writers- Best Sellers, Fiction; February 11, 1936; by Paul A. T. Noon

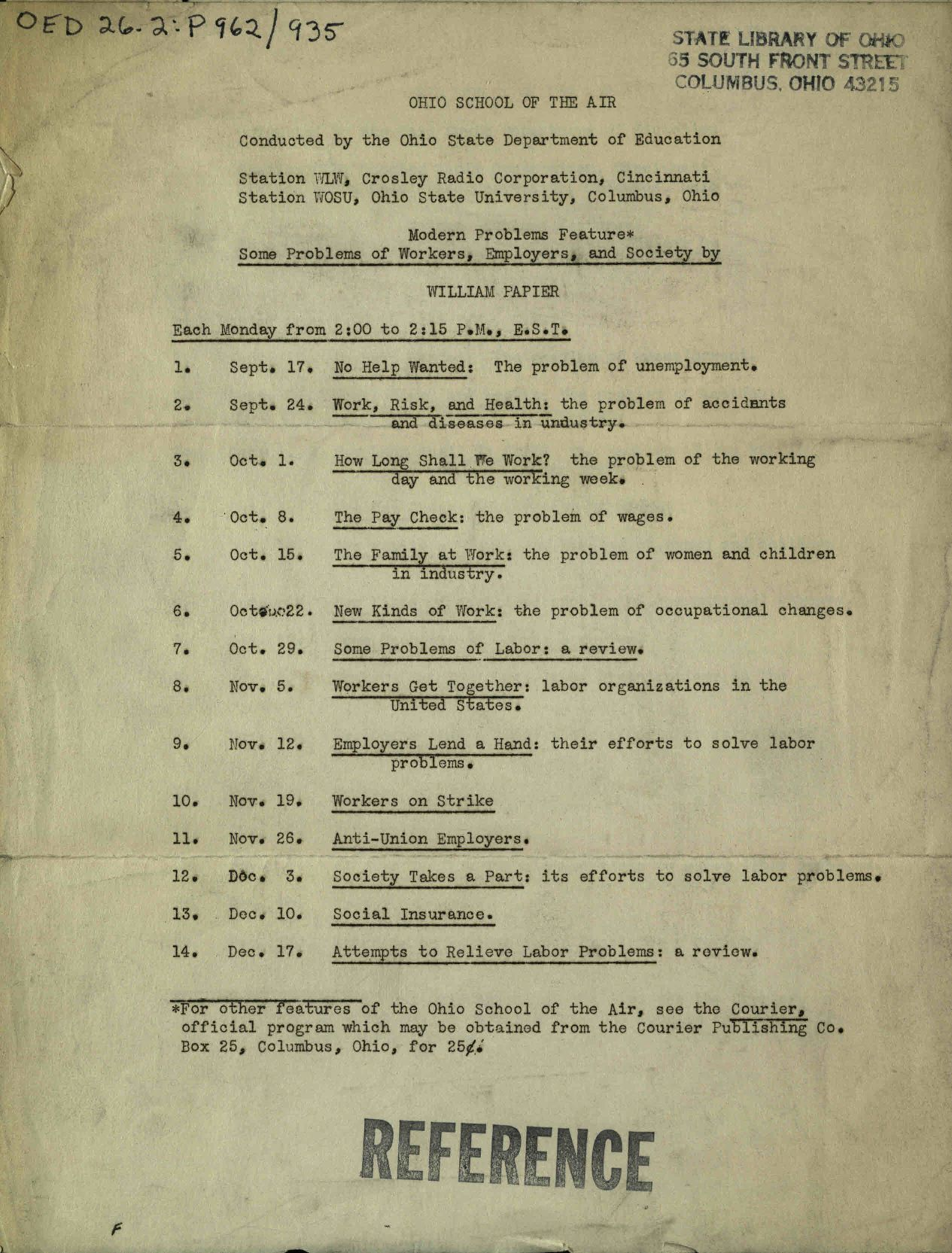
Ohio School of the Air program syllabus: Modern Problems Feature* Some Problems of Workers, Employers and Society; (undated, c.1935); by William Papier

== Other educational radio broadcasts of the period ==
- Some of the earliest stations were in Pittsburgh and Detroit, with stations KDKA (AM) and WWJ (AM), respectively, both alleging to have been the first airing educational broadcasts during the fall of 1920. Some of the earliest public school systems experimenting with classroom broadcasting were in Oakland, Indianapolis, Cleveland and Pittsburg, all having produced and broadcast a series of educational programs as early as 1922.
- Oakland, CA was an early public school broadcasting core curriculum into its classrooms using station KGO. Its date of first broadcasting was misquoted in some sources, e.g. 1921 (Federal Council of the Churches of Christ in America, 1938). Station KGO (later renamed KSFO) began transmitting on January 8, 1924. KGO was a commercial station, though also broadcast classroom-oriented lessons during 1924-1926.
- In early 1922, Tufts College, later Tufts University, was broadcasting college course lectures through Boston's station WGI with subjects including arts, architecture, economics, athletics and world events. Media labeled their programming a "wireless college."

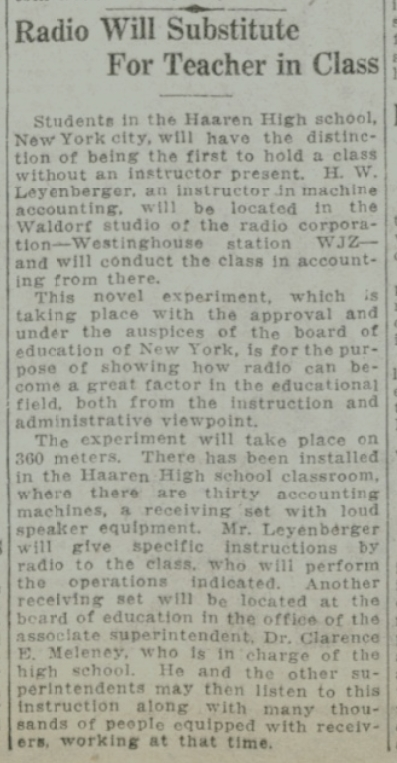
1923- The first classroom experiment with remote learning, broadcasting instructions from a New Jersey studio into a New York city classroom.

- In 1923 Haaren High School of New York City became the first public school to employ radio-broadcast instructions in the classroom. Accounting class students using mechanical calculators were guided through lessons by a remote teacher broadcasting from Newark, New Jersey's WJZ (now WABC), an accomplishment publicized by newspapers and magazines of the time, e.g., Radio News and Popular Science. Later that year California's public schools begin broadcasting penmanship, arithmetic, and history lessons.
- The Standard School Broadcast (SSB) began broadcasting September 20, 1928, in California. Its seventh of a series of musical lesson broadcasts received advanced announcement via local newsprint. SSB's educational program was designed as a supplement to regular classroom instruction. Some published articles erringly list SSB's first broadcast as 1927 (Radio Today Yearbook, 1937-1938).
- In 1930, Europe's educational focus with radio programming was parsed between three target groups; young students, adults and general public.
  - Britain's school systems did not have a centralized curriculum, but used material chosen independently by the head teacher at each school; this splintered plan-of-study did not align with a common program model. Britain's use for radio broadcasting consisted of approximately 70% music directed to the general audience; 20% talks (e.g. general news, commentaries, debates) with its educational content directed equally between adult and school-aged audiences; 5% for an early evening children's hour; with the remainder religion.
  - In Hungary and Russia, both having populations with high illiteracy, educational programs aired throughout the day targeting primarily adults with current news, music, and instructions in reading and writing. In regions around Moscow the content changed in synchronism with laborers' work shifts as they departed their factories. Content became focused near-solely on industrial issues, e.g. regulations, working conditions and factory output. This implementation of targeted content based on location and time-of-day was deemed novel, worthy of replication in other radio market areas.
  - Switzerland was the only European country to organize technical training specifically for young apprentice students, establishing mandatory remote learning courses for those living in mountainous areas, inaccessible to technical schools.
- Wisconsin's School of the Air (WSA) was born from a 1930 Payne Fund experiment at the University of Wisconsin–Madison, assessing radio teaching effectiveness. WSA focused on the educational needs of the rural elementary students and teachers. It began broadcasting over station WHA (AM) on October 5, 1931, and operated through the 1970–71 school year having annual enrollments exceeding 300,000 students. WSA attracted more of the state's K-8 school population (25-56%) during its tenure than any other SOA.
- Portland's city-school station KBPS (AM) began operating in 1933 and continued into the mid-1990s, making it the longest running program in the Nation. Key to its longevity was student and teacher involvement in program creation; from writing, to performing, to the station's technical engineering. Its students earned several national awards and recognitions.
- Toledo's public school station WTDS-FM operated from 1948 to 1964. Its Radio-Visual Education Department gave students practical hands-on experience in program production, broadcast announcing and radio station operation. OSOA re-broadcast several of Toledo's student programs acquired via the NAEB Tape Network and by direct station-to-station barters (see "Program creation" section).
- Through the 1930s-40s educational programing across America had primarily developed as city-focused, state-focused or national. Several city-based examples were Cleveland's schools, Chicago's schools via WBEZ and Detroit's via WTDR. State-wide SOAs existed in Ohio, Minnesota, North Carolia, Oregon, Texas and Wisconsin. Nationally broadcast examples were CBS' The American School of the Air and NBC's Walter Damrosch's Music Appreciation Hour.

== See also ==
- The American School of the Air
- School of the Air, Australia's nationwide School of the Air
- Radio Trailblazing: A Brief History of the Ohio School of the Air and Its Implications for Educational Broadcasting by B.H Darrow.
- Listen to 1937 broadcast recordings of OSOA's "Men Who Made America" series at Radioechoes
