= The American School of the Air =

Educational radio program

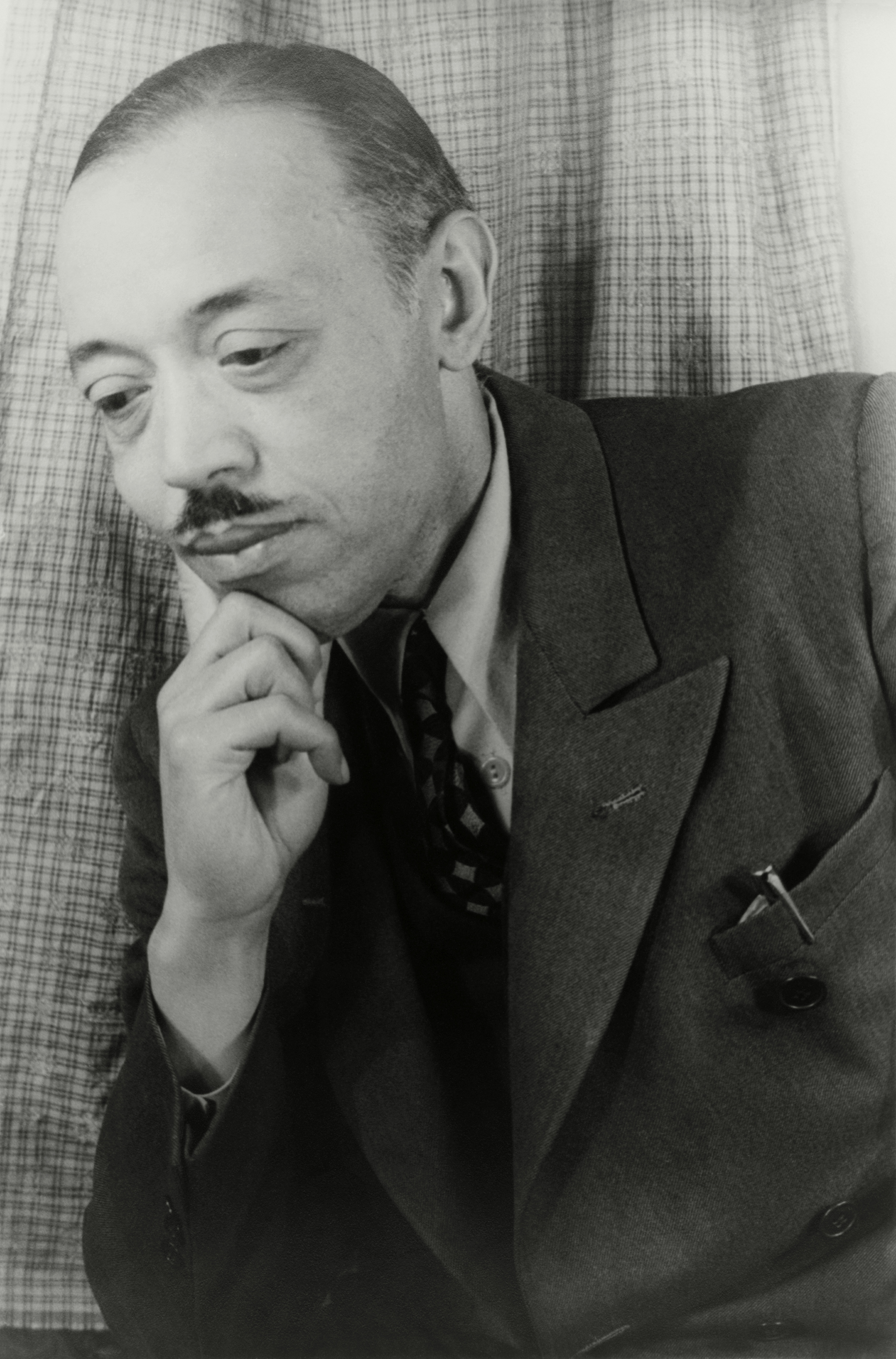
- In 1940 composer William Grant Still received a commission from CBS to create an original composition for The American School of the Air.
- Other names: The American School of the Air of the Americas
- Genre: Educational programming
- Country of origin: United States
- Language: English
- Home station: WABC
- Syndicates: CBS
- Original release: February 4, 1930 – April 30, 1948

The American School of the Air was a half-hour educational radio program presented by CBS as a public affairs teaching supplement over an 18-year period during the 1930s and 1940s. CBS followed the lead of the Ohio School of the Air which began in 1929 at Ohio State University.

Program policies for The American School of the Air were established by an advisory board. The series began February 4, 1930, broadcast on weekdays at 2:30 p.m. The initial episode (about Columbus' discovery of America) had an audience estimated at 1,500,000 students in 20,000 schools. The programs originated at WABC in New York City. Faculty included "16 of the nation's greatest educators", with Columbia University Professor of Education William C. Bagley heading the group.

Although the program's target group was school students, its audience reached beyond them. During the 1931–1932 season, more than one-third of the program's fan mail came from adults who were not directly involved with formal education, including housewives, business executives, "old people", shut-ins, and immigrants.

In 1939, it aired at 9:15 in the morning and was heard nationwide in over 100,000 classrooms by an estimated 3,000,000 children every day. Its success prompted NBC to launch Its University of the Air in 1942.

During World War II, its programming changed markedly. Retitled The American School of the Air of the Americas in 1940, it now took on a Pan-American outlook, reaching out to Canadian and Latin American audiences. Programs typically dwelled on the historical and cultural heritage, common struggles, and shared interests of the peoples in the New World. With support from Nelson A. Rockefeller's Office of the Coordinator of Inter-American Affairs (1940–46), CBS had its educational programs translated into Spanish and Portuguese and broadcast over its Pan-American network of stations, the Cadena de las Américas. By 1941, The American School of the Air of the Americas had expanded into 15 countries. When the United States entered the war, it became ”the official channel through which the Office of War Information will convey news, information and instructions for civilian activities to children and young people, teachers and parents of America.” In 1945, the program moved to a late afternoon timeslot, 5:00 p.m.

Different topics were featured throughout the week under the umbrella title. The 1931-1932 schedule is shown in the table below:

Day	Subject
Monday	American and ancient history
Tuesday	Geography travelogues and music appreciation
Wednesday	Famous literary works alternating with art appreciation
Thursday	Dramatizations of children's works, interpretations of folk songs, and nature study
Friday	Vocational guidance dialogues alternating with talks by government officials, each followed by current events and interpretation of news

As established by 1939, industry and agriculture were the focus of the Monday series, "Frontiers of Democracy," including such subjects as "Frontiers of Work in Industry," "Science & Human Progress," "Health and Food," "Health in Childhood," "Frontiers of Work on the Farm" and "Frontiers in the Professions."

Tuesdays were devoted to "Folk Music of America" and other musical genres. During 1939–40, Alan Lomax wrote, produced and directed a 26-week historical overview, the "American Folk Songs" series, a survey of English language folk songs from the holdings of his underfunded Archive of American Folksongs.

A work by composer William Grant Still was commissioned by CBS in 1940. In 1949, for The American School of the Air, Amadeo De Filippi composed "Raftsman's Dance," based on two Ohio river songs, "Raftsman Jim" and "Going Up the River."

American explorers and exploration were heard in "New Horizons" on Wednesdays, with "Tales from Far and Near" on Thursdays. The week ended with dramatizations of modern life in "This Living World." Helen Garman did the radio adaptation of Citizen Tom Paine, an episode of "Tales from Far and Near" broadcast on February 18, 1946.

The musical theme was Beethoven's Lenore Overture Number 3. Robert Trout and John Reed King were the announcers. Scripts were by Howard Rodman and others. Actors who appeared on this program included Orson Welles, Ray Collins, Walter Tetley and Parker Fennelly.

Beginning on September 30, 1946, CBS moved the program to the 5–5:30 p.m. time slot, a time at which other networks' "strongest kid shows" were broadcast. The network also increased the press run for its Manual of the School of the Air from 100,000 to 500,000. That change allowed program plans and related information to go to a broader audience than teachers.

The series came to an end on April 30, 1948. CBS officials cited the network's shift in public-affairs programming away from classroom audiences toward families.

== See also ==
- School of the Air (Ohio)
- School of the Air, Australia's nationwide SOA

== Listen to ==
- "Radio in a Modern School Program": rereading of a March 20, 1939 broadcast by Gertrude Metze
