= Hour of Music =

Australian television series

- Also known as: The Commonwealth Bank's Hour of Music
- Genre: Music television
- Country of origin: Australia
- Original language: English

Production
- Running time: 60 minutes; 45 minutes

Original release
- Network: ATN-7
- Release: 1959 – 1960

Hour of Music, also known as The Commonwealth Bank's Hour of Music, is an Australian television series which aired from 1959 to 1960 on Sydney station ATN-7. It featured classical music. The third episode featured singers Stuart Harvey, Marjorie Conley and Geoffrey Chard, as well as violinist Maurice Stead. Each episode featured the ATN Orchestra led by Thomas Tycho. Originally aired in a 60-minute time-slot, towards the end of the run the episodes aired in an unusual 45-minute time-slot. The live series usually aired on Sundays.
