= Music Appreciation Hour =

Music Appreciation Hour was a National Broadcasting Company radio series that offered lectures on classical music aimed at students. The show was part of a broader mid-20th-century movement to popularize serious music. From 1928 to 1942, orchestra conductor Walter Damrosch hosted the show.

Radio Guide (March 18, 1939) commented:

In this music workshop Dr. Walter Damrosch analyzes types of compositions, illustrates functions and effects of instruments, reviews and compares the works of outstanding composers to promote an enjoyment of good music through an understanding of it.

Except for the West Coast, Music Appreciation Hour was broadcast during school hours, and NBC provided teachers with supplementary materials. It also aired on Saturdays; in Nashville, Tennessee, local NBC affiliate WSM aired the program immediately before its weekly barn dance broadcast. A comment from Damrosch on a 1928 broadcast about there being no room in the classics for realism prompted host George D. Hay to comment how much the barn dance contrasted with the classics: as opposed to grand opera, Hay's program presented the Grand Ole Opry, thus offhandedly giving that program the name it has held for nine decades since.

== Sources ==
- Joseph Horowitz, Understanding Toscanini—How He Became an American Culture–God and Helped Create a New Audience for Old Music (Knopf, 1987)
- Theodor W. Adorno, "Analytical Study of the NBC 'Music Appreciation Hour.'" Unpublished manuscript. 1938-40. The Musical Quarterly 78:2 (Summer 1994): 325-377.
