= Leon Charney =

American lawyer

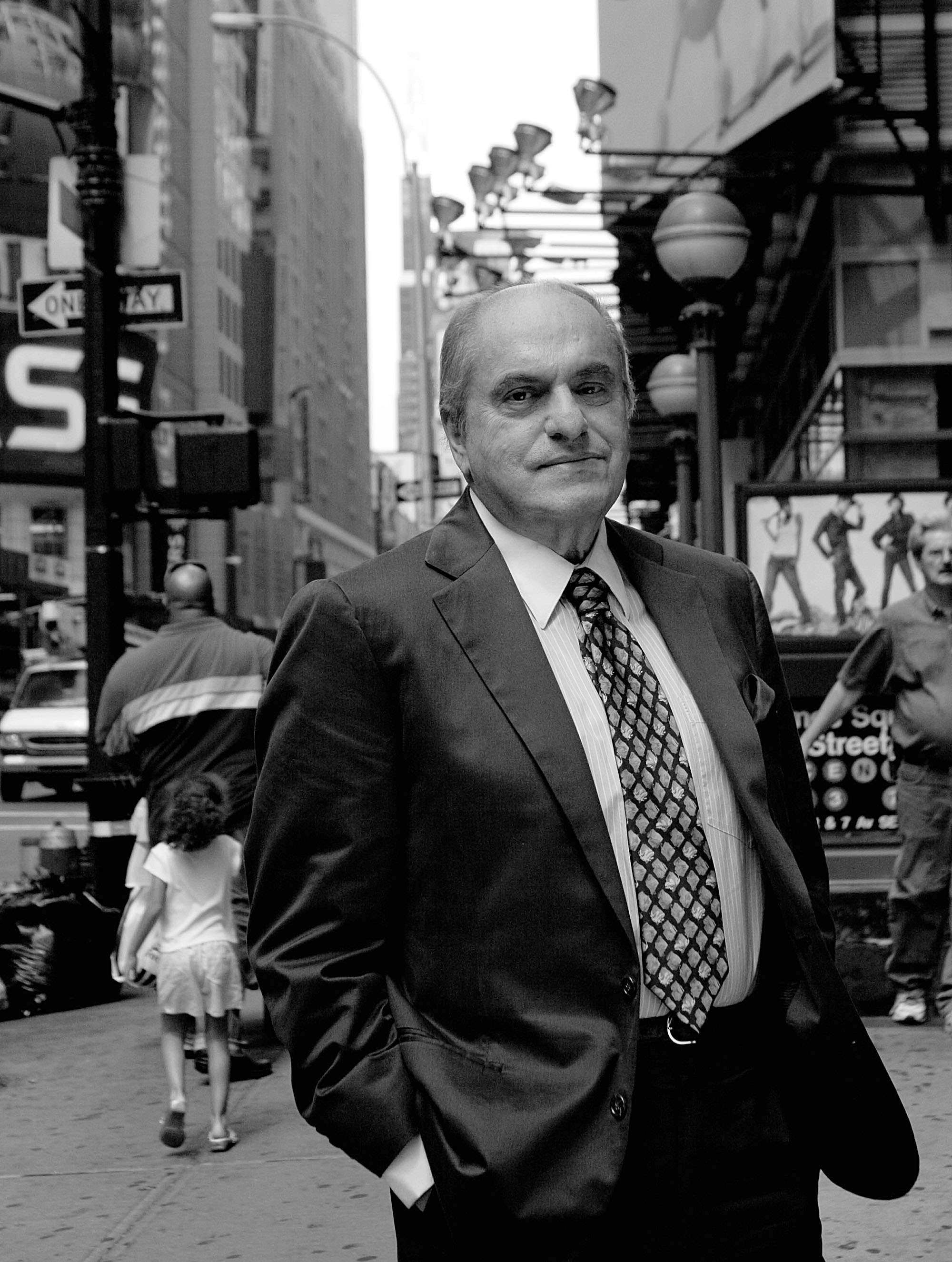
- Born: July 23, 1938; Bayonne, New Jersey, U.S.
- Died: March 21, 2016 (aged 77)
- Education: Yeshiva University; Brooklyn Law School
- Occupations: Real estate investor, attorney, political advisor, talk-show host, author, cantor, philanthropist
- Spouse: Tzili Doron
- Children: Mickey Charney; Nati Charney
- Website: www.lhcharney.com

Leon Charney (July 23, 1938 – March 21, 2016) was an American real estate tycoon, attorney, author, philanthropist, political pundit, media personality and Jewish cantor. He lived in Manhattan in New York City, dividing his time between his residences in Tel Aviv and Boca Raton, Florida. In March 2012, Forbes listed Charney as No. 353 among the wealthiest Americans. He was a graduate of Yeshiva University where he participated in demonstrations to free Soviet Jewry, and Brooklyn Law School.

Charney was best known as a New York real estate baron, but his role as one of the backdoor players integral to sealing the Camp David Peace Treaty between Israel and Egypt later emerged. In 1979, Charney played an important role as the unofficial adviser to former U.S. President Jimmy Carter, most well known for his behind-the-scenes role in the Camp David Accords which created the first comprehensive peace between Israel and Egypt in 1978 and 1979.

In 2008, some thirty years later, Charney, a major real estate owner in New York's Times Square, appeared for the first time on the Forbes 400 list of the wealthiest Americans, debuting at No. 321. The 2009 list – the first to reflect the world financial crisis, indicated Charney's net worth had fallen in the previous year, although his rank had jumped to No. 296, up 35 notches, indicating that while he lost wealth, he lost less than other fellow billionaires. For 2010, Charney ranked No. 308 on the Forbes 400.

== Early life ==
Leon Harris Charney was born to a Jewish family in Bayonne, New Jersey, to Morris, a sewing supplies salesman who died at a young age when his son was young, and Sara Charney. He grew up poor. He attended Jewish day schools, worked as a counselor at Camp Winsokee, graduated from Yeshiva University in 1960, and from Brooklyn Law School in 1964. He paid for his education in part by singing in synagogues, and by selling sewing machines door-to-door.

== Career ==
He became a member of the bar in 1965, and with $200 in the bank started his own law firm representing sports and show-business personalities, including Jackie Mason and Sammy Davis Jr. As a young attorney, he was also a fierce advocate for the passage of the Good Samaritan Law after witnessing a man die in public when doctors refused to intervene out of fear of being sued.

Charney became counsel and adviser at age 36 to U.S. Senator Vance Hartke of Indiana, and was his special counsel for six years. Through Hartke, Charney became more involved in international politics and diplomacy. He became close to Golda Meir, Prime Minister of Israel, with whom Charney worked on Israel's initiative to free Soviet Jews and help them emigrate to Israel.

That effort saw the emigration of 1,000 Jews from Minsk in the Soviet Union to Israel. Later, United States President Jimmy Carter asked Charney to help advise him during the Camp David Accords. Charney refers to his efforts as using "back door channels", and he advised President Jimmy Carter from 1977 to 1981. In a forward for one of Charney's books, Carter referred to Charney as "the unsung hero of the Camp David Peace Treaty."

In 1986 Charney went to Tunisia to meet with Yasser Arafat in the hope of a possible peaceful resolution of the Israeli–Palestinian conflict.

=== The Back Door Channel ===
In 2009, Charney was a featured interviewee in a Harry Hunkele documentary film starring former U.S. President Jimmy Carter entitled Back Door Channels: The Price of Peace which opened in Abu Dhabi in October 2010 at the Abu Dhabi Film Festival. Upon its debut, the film was the source of much buzz in the diplomatic sphere, as it is rumored that many never before revealed aspects of the original peace process were unveiled, some of which painted a less than rosy picture of American diplomatic efforts at the time.

The film itself was a source of some controversy in New York political circles. The film deals with the 1979 Peace Treaty between Israel and Egypt and the real-life behind-the scenes drama that led to the historic peace treaty. The film's title is actually an opaque reference to Charney himself, considered by many to be the "back door channel" that enabled the Camp David peace to materialize. In addition to Carter and Charney, the film features former Secretary-General of the U.N. Boutros Boutros-Ghali, Dr. Henry Kissinger, the former U.S. Secretary of State, CNN's Wolf Blitzer, and Senior Adviser to King Mohammed VI of Morocco, André Azoulay and many other international dignitaries who played roles both major and minor in the Israeli-Egyptian peace.

In 2014, Charney received an Emmy Award for the television version of the documentary after it aired on PBS.

=== The Leon Charney Report ===
Charney hosted a national weekly TV talk show Leon Charney Report which dealt with local New York politics, foreign affairs and the Middle East, social issues and popular culture. Over its 25 years of broadcasting, the show featured numerous prominent guests including Ed Koch, Rudy Giuliani, David Dinkins, Shimon Peres, Yitzhak Rabin, and Ehud Barak. Although his show was seen weekly on WNYE-TV for years, in later years it gained ground after Arnie Mazer became the Senior Producer and when the station became NYC Media in 2005, after New York City Mayor Michael Bloomberg enabled his top media executive, Arick Wierson, to merge the stations with the existing nyctv cable channels. Via nyctv, The Charney Report began podcasting its audio version on NPR and the audio component began to be nationally syndicated as radio programming.

=== As an Author ===
Charney was the author of five books, two on topics in Judaism, The Mystery of the Kaddish: Its Profound Influence on Judaism, and Battle of the Two Talmuds: Judaism's Struggle with Power, Glory, & Guilt; and three about the peace process between Israel and its Arab neighbors, The Charney Report: Confronting the Israeli-Arab Conflict, Special Counsel, and Back Door Channels: The Price of Peace.

== Personal life ==
Charney held an honorary title as the Chairman of the University of Haifa in Israel. Although not considered to be overtly religious, Charney was a Jewish cantor, singing on Sabbaths and Holy Jewish Holidays at places of worship across the United States. He married Israeli-born Tzili Doron and with her he had two twin boys, Mickey and Nati. Doron is a first cousin of Israeli supermodel Bar Refaeli. Charney had close ties to Israel through his sister Bryna Blumenreich Dryer, who lives in Raanana, Israel along with her children.

Charney died on March 21, 2016.

=== Philanthropy ===
In 2003, Charney donated $10 million to NYU Langone Medical Center for a new cardiac wing of the hospital. He is also the major benefactor of the University of Haifa's Leon H. Charney School of Marine Sciences, for which he reportedly donated more than $10 million in 2007.

=== Honors ===
Charney received honorary doctorates for his work in peacemaking including those from the University of Haifa, Yeshiva University, Florida Atlantic University, and the University of Indianapolis. Charney also received awards from a number of institutions and city governments including the City of New York, City of Bayonne, and the Foundation for Ethnic Understanding. In 2016, the Diplomacy Program at Florida Atlantic University was named in honor of Mr. Charney. The Leon Charney Diplomacy Program, which trains undergraduate students in the art of negotiation, debate and conflict resolution, placed first overall in the National Model United Nations competition in Washington, D.C. three times (2018, 2020, 2021).
