= Abu Dhabi Film Festival =

International film festival

Abu Dhabi Film Festival مهرجان أبو ظبي السينمائي
- Location: Abu Dhabi, United Arab Emirates
- Awards: Black Pearl Awards
- Festival date: October
- Website: www.abudhabifestival.ae

The Abu Dhabi Film Festival (ADFF; Arabic: مهرجان أبو ظبي السينمائي), formerly the Middle East International Film Festival (MEIFF), was an international film festival held in the city of Abu Dhabi, United Arab Emirates from 2007 to 2015.

== History ==
The Middle East International Film Festival (MEIFF) debuted in 2007, in an effort to rival the "cultural dominance of Dubai", with 152 movies and 186 screenings shown in five Abu Dhabi venues. It was established with the support of H.E. Mohammed Khalaf AL Mazroui as General Director of the Abu Dhabi Authority for Culture & Heritage (ADACH), and Nashwa Al Ruwaini as executive director. In 2008, Lebanese filmmaker Imad DeirAtany joined the team. In its first few editions, it aimed to showcase international films.

In 2010, for the 4th edition of the festival, ADACH developed the festival's brand and changed its name to Abu Dhabi Film Festival. Peter Scarlet, former artistic director of the San Francisco International Film Festival and Tribeca Film Festival, (Note: "Scarlet had left his role as creative director of the Tribeca Film Festival in early 2009, then served for a year as the director general of the Cinematheque Francaise, and then took over the Abu Dhabi fest. Before his seven years at Tribeca, he ran the San Francisco International Film Festival for 20 years.") was appointed director of the festival, and its focus changed to showcasing Arab cinema as well as bringing quality international films to Arab audiences.

In 2011, the Abu Dhabi Film Festival launched the SANAD development and post-production fund for cineastes from the Arab world. With the goal of encouraging independent and auteur-based cinema, eligible filmmakers had access to grants, screenwriting workshops, and personal meetings with industry mentors and experts.

From 2012, the festival was part of the Abu Dhabi Media Zone Authority, specifically under Media Zone Events and powered by its partner company, twofour54. In August 2012, Scarlet left the role, shortly before the event was staged in October of that year, and his colleague Ali Al Jabri took over the position.

ADFF was officially scrapped after eight editions in 2015.

== Description ==
The event was held annually in October in the city of Abu Dhabi, United Arab Emirates. The ADFF aimed to showcase the best films from the region alongside standout productions from prominent international filmmakers.

Noteworthy names attending ADFF included director Michael Greenspan (best known for his feature film Wrecked, which debuted there in 2009), as well as actors such as Uma Thurman and Adrien Brody, who attended in 2010.

In October 2009, The Guardian published an article about the origins and intent of the MEIFF. The article noted that although the host country then had only a small indigenous film-making industry, the film festival could serve a variety of constructive purposes.

== Selected events ==
=== 2010 ===
Films included in the 2010 edition included:

- Secretariat, directed by Randall Wallace, the world premiere of a major Hollywood feature film
- Fair Game, a political thriller directed by Doug Liman and starring Naomi Watts and Sean Penn
- In a Better World by the Danish filmmaker Susanne Bier
- Incendies, directed by Canadian filmmaker Denis Villeneuve, based on a play by Canadian-Lebanese writer Wajdi Mouawad
- Messages from the Sea by Egyptian filmmaker Daoud Abdel Sayed
- Cirkus Columbia, directed by Danis Tanovic
- Back Door Channels: The Price of Peace, a documentary about the Camp David Peace Accord directed by American director Harry Hunkele and produced by Arick Wierson
- The Oath, a documentary by director Laura Poitras

== Black Pearl Award ==
=== 2011 winners ===
Short Narrative Competition

- First Prize (AED 30,000) – SOUL, directed by Fatma Abdulla (UAE)
- Second Prize (AED 25,000) – DREAMS OF RICE, by Yasser Al Neyadi and Hana Al Shatri (UAE)
- Third Prize (AED 20,000) – TELEPHONI, directed by Hassan Kiyany (UAE)
- Special Jury Award (AED 25,000) – RANEEN, directed by Maitham Al Musawi (Oman)
- Best Emirati Film (AED 25,000) – SOUL, directed by Fatma Abdulla (UAE)
- Best Script (AED 10,000) – SINGLE MALE, by Imad DeirAtany (Lebanon) / DREAMS OF RICE, by Yasser Al Neyadi and Hana Al Shatri (UAE)
- Best Cinematography (AED 10,000) – WIND, directed by Waleed Al Shehhi (UAE)

Short Documentary Competition

- First Prize (AED 30,000) – A Falcon Will Not Breed a Dove, by Mansour Al Dhaheri (UAE)
- Second Prize (AED 25,000) – PHOTON, by Awadh Al Hamzani (Saudi Arabia)
- Third Prize (AED 20,000) – A NIGHT TO REMEMBER, by Fahmi Farahat (Saudi Arabia)
- Special Jury Award (AED 25,000) – LETTERS TO PALESTINE, by Rashid Al Marri (UAE)

Student Short Narrative Competition

- First Prize (AED 20,000) – MAHER’S CAMERA, by Mansour Al Badran (Saudi Arabia)
- Second Prize (AED 15,000) – MAD CAMEL, by Mohammed Fikree (UAE)
- Third Prize (AED 10,000) – DINNER #7665, by Salma Serry (UAE, Egypt)

Student Short Documentary Competition

- First Prize (AED 20,000) – 6 ON 18, by Salma Serry (UAE, Egypt)
- Second Prize (AED 15,000) – LAYERS, by Manal Wicki (UAE)
- Third Prize (AED 10,000) – LAHJATNA (OUR ACCENT), by Mariam Al Nuaimi (UAE)

International Short Film Competition

The 2011 selection featured 31 films from 23 countries, as well as two newly launched awards for producers of short films.

- Best Narrative ($25,000) – A Marriage , directed by Henning Rosenlund (Norway)
- Best Documentary ($25,000) – WRITTEN IN INK, directed by Martin Rath (Poland)
- Best Animation ($20,000) – LUMINARIS, directed by Juan Pablo Zaramella (Argentina), shared with SPECKY FOUR-EYES, directed by Jean-Claude Rozec (France)
- Best Film from the Arab World ($25,000) – FAREWELL EXILE, directed by Lamia Alami (Morocco)
- Best Producer ($10,000) – Arben Zharku (Kosovo) for THE WEDDING TAPE
- Best Producer from the Arab World ($10,000) – YACINE BOUAZIZ (Algeria) for TOMORROW, ALGIERS?

=== 2010 winners ===
- Best Narrative Film – Maromoulak (The Lizard), directed by Kamal Tabrizi (Iran)
- Best Documentary – The Oath, directed by Laura Poitras (USA)
- Best Narrative Short – Little Hill, directed by Gabriel Siren (Brazil)
- Best Documentary Short – The Suffering Grasses, directed by Iara Lee (Brazil)
- Best Emirati Director – Feeding Five Hundred, directed by Rafed Al Harthi (UAE)
- Best Actress – Lubna Azabel for Incendies (Canada)
- Best Actor – Javier Bardem for Biutiful (Mexico)
- Best Cinematography – Silent Souls, cinematography by Mikhail Krichman (Russia)
- Best Screenplay – Of Gods and Men, screenplay by Xavier Beauvois, Etienne Comar (France)

=== 2009 winners ===
In 2009, 16 Black Pearl awards were given in 3 major categories (narrative, documentary, and short films). Also given were also 7 Jury Special Mention awards, and one Audience Choice Award. Among all entries worldwide, the best film winners were as follows:

The Black Pearl Award for Best Narrative Film – $100,000

Hipsters (Stilyagi)

Director: Valery Todorovsky (Russia)

The Black Pearl Award for Best Documentary Film – $100,000

The Frontier Gandhi: Badshah Khan, A Torch for Peace

Director: T. C. McLuhan (Afghanistan, India, Pakistan, USA)

The Black Pearl Award for Best Narrative Short – $25,000

The Six Dollar Fifty Man

Director: Mark Albiston and Louis Sutherland (New Zealand)

The Black Pearl Award for Best Narrative Short – $25,000

Wagah

Director: Supriyo Sen and Najaf Bilgrami (Pakistan, India, Germany)

=== 2008 winners ===
The Black Pearl for Best Narrative Film – $200,000
Disgrace
Director: Steve Jacobs. Producers: Anna Maria Monticelli, Emile Sherman, Steve Jacobs

The Black Pearl for Best Documentary – $150,000
Stranded
Director: Gonzalo Arijon. Producer: Marc Silvera

The Black Pearl Special Jury Prize – $125,000
Youssou N'Dour: I Bring What I Love
Director and Producer: Elisabeth Chai Vasarhelyi

The Black Pearl for Best Actress – $75,000
Fawzia: A Special Blend
Actress: Ilham Shaheen

The Black Pearl for Best Actor – $75,000
Wild Blood
Actor: Luca Zingaretti

The Black Pearl for Best Artistic Contribution – $75,000
Laila's Birthday
Screenwriter: Rashid Masharawi

The Black Pearl Audience Choice Award
Saving Luna
Co-Directors: Suzanne Chisholm & Michael Parfit. Producer: Suzanne Chisholm

The Black Pearl for Best Narrative – Short Film – $75.000
The View
Co-Directors: Hazim Bitar & Rifqi Assaf. Producer: Amman Filmmakers Cooperative

The Black Pearl for Best Documentary – Short Film – $75.000
Breadmakers
Director: Yasmin Fedda. Producers: Jim Hickey & Robin Mitchell

The Black Pearl for Best Animation – Shot Film – $75.000
Jacinta
Director: Karla Casteneda. Producer: Luis Tellez

The Black Pearl for Best Narrative – Student Films – $25.000
Illusion
Director: Burhan Qurbani. Producer: Fabian Gasmia

The Black Pearl for Best Emerging Filmmaker – Student Films – $25.000
Lullaby
Director: Serena Abi Aad. Producer: IESAV

=== 2007 Winners ===
- Best Narrative Feature – The Yacoubian Building (Egypt)
- Best Documentary Feature – To Die in Jerusalem (USA)
- Best Narrative Short – A Thousand Words (USA)
- Best Documentary Short – Crossing Borders (France)
- Best Emirati Director – The Forgotten, directed by Nayla Al Khaja (UAE)

== See also ==
- Dubai International Film Festival
- Abu Dhabi Authority for Culture & Heritage
