= Garvald Centres =

Scottish charities

The Garvald Centres are a group of six affiliated but independent Scottish charities that support people with special needs and learning disabilities. It is based on the work of Rudolf Steiner. The charities operate in the Midlothian, Scottish Borders, and Edinburgh locations of Scotland.

== Founding ==
The Garvald School and Training Centre was founded near West Linton in 1944 by Dr Hans Schauder, his wife Lisl, and others who decided to join him after working at the Camphill community in Aberdeen for some years. Dr Schauder himself was of Viennese origin and had fled Austria some years previously as he came from a Jewish family. Connected with anthroposophy, the medical and therapeutic work of Rudolf Steiner, and with the group around Karl König, he had been among the founders of Camphill. After working at Garvald for some years he opened his own practice in Edinburgh and developed his own method of counseling until meeting the Dominican friar, Lefébure, with whom he wrote his best-known work Conversations on Counselling.

The Garvald school later became the Garvald Training Centre and later became six independent communities:

Garvald West Linton, the original community established in 1944.

Garvald Edinburgh, established in 1969, runs a bakery and confectionery delivering to whole food shops, delicatessens, and cafés and private customers, which was featured in the short film Breadmakers produced by Jim Hickey and Robin Mitchell and directed by Yasmin Fedda in 2007. The Mulberry Bush Shop sells artisan gifts produced in their workshops as well as books, art materials, and crafts produced by other suppliers. Craft workshops include a glass studio, joinery, pottery, puppetry, textiles, and hand tool refurbishment. In 2007 it opened the Orwell Arts building in the city, where the former Dalry Primary School had been.

The Engine Shed, an extension of Garvald Edinburgh founded in the 1980s.

The Columcille Centre has a range of programmes, such as Edinburgh All, Columcille Eskbank, Music for All, the Library project, Columcille Hall which is also available for rental and the Columcille Ceili Band, which was featured in the documentary About A Band by Jim Hickey and Robin Mitchell. In addition, it hosts the Makers Markets.

Garvald Glenesk, a residential care centre established in 1998.

Garvald Home Farm, a Biodynamic farm associated with Garvald West Linton established in 1987

== Garvald social therapy ==
The centres are rooted in Rudolf Steiner's principles on social therapy, aiming to provide structure and rhythm to members' lives, foster a sense of community through shared activities and events, and ensure the workshops produce high-quality items that benefit others. The focus is on offering creative working environments that emphasize craft, catering, artistic skills, and agriculture, encouraging a connection to nature and allowing individuals to express their creativity.

In addition to craft activities, the centres use approaches like the Talking Points methodology to focus on outcomes for service users and carers. They have developed Talking Points tools specifically for people with learning disabilities. These resources aim to empower individuals to impact their environment and community. The centres also offer various therapies, including eurythmy, creative speech, massage, and other therapeutic arts.

Many of the studios and workshops have an enterprise focus, generating income to offset running costs and helping people gain confidence. The workshops teach skills applicable in a work environment and encourage ongoing creative development. The centres support individuals with a range of needs and syndromes, including autism, Down syndrome, fragile X syndrome, epilepsy, Prader-Willi syndrome, dual diagnosis, and other physical and communication difficulties. Members' ages range from sixteen to the mid-seventies.

== See also ==
- Camphill Movement
