= Schauder =

Schauder is a surname. Notable people with the surname include:

- Hans Schauder (1911–2001), British educator
- Juliusz Schauder (1899–1943), Polish mathematician
- Lukas Schauder (born 1997), German politician
- Till Schauder (born 1971), German-American filmmaker
