= Jan Malcolm =

Minnesota former health commissioner

10th Commissioner of the Minnesota Department of Health
- In office 19 January 1999 – 2003
- Governor: Jesse Ventura
- Preceded by: Anne Barry
- Succeeded by: Dianne Mandernach

16th Commissioner of the Minnesota Department of Health
- In office 31 January 2018 – January 2023
- Governor: Mark Dayton; Tim Walz
- Preceded by: Ed Ehlinger
- Succeeded by: Brooke Cunningham

Personal details
- Spouse: Kris Carlton
- Education: Dartmouth College
- Occupation: Psychologist

Jan Malcolm is a former Health Commissioner of Minnesota. She has served twice as the Commissioner for the Minnesota Department of Health under three different governors; first from 1999 to 2003 under former governor Jesse Ventura, and secondly from 2018 to 2023 under Mark Dayton and Tim Walz.

== Early life ==
Malcolm graduated from Minnetonka High School in Minnesota in 1973. She attended Dartmouth College, earning a bachelor’s degree in philosophy and psychology.

== Career ==
Malcolm served as an Adjunct Professor at the University of Minnesota at the School of Public Health, as well as working as the CEO of Courage Center and the Vice President of Public Affairs and Philanthropy at Allina Health.

Most notably, Malcolm served as Health Commissioner under three different governors of Minnesota. Malcolm began her first term as Commissioner under Jesse Ventura. She served from 1999-2003 Nearly twenty years later, she was appointed by Mark Dayton after her predecessor, Ed Ehlinger, resigned. She was put in charge over 1,500 employees and a budget of over $600 million. Throughout the COVID-19 pandemic, she faced intense criticism from the Republican party, facing repeated calls to remove her from her position.

In 2024, the American Medical Association honored her with the AMA Award for Outstanding Government Service.

== Personal life ==
Malcolm was married to Kris Carlton, who died in 2019. She remains close friends with her high school classmate Ann Reed, notable folk singer and songwriter.

In June 2021, Malcolm was awarded the Lavender Community Pride Award for LGBTQ Individual.

== Notable works ==
- Leading Public Health: A Competency Framework
