= The Bridge (2005 TV series) =

2005 American TV series

The Bridge is an American documentary television series chronicling the history of hip hop in New York City. The show airs weekly on WNYE in the New York City area. The show got its start in 2005 when NYC TV acquired broadcast station WNYE.

The show was created and produced by Arick Wierson and Matthew Tollin. Directed by Trevor Scotland, The Bridge is hosted by Hot 97 DJ and hip hop legend Ralph McDaniels. The series quickly emerged as a cultural touchstone for NYC TV. Season one of The Bridge was co-hosted by Tiffani Webb, however she left the show due to renegotiation issues.
