= Arben Zharku =

Actor and producer from Kosovo

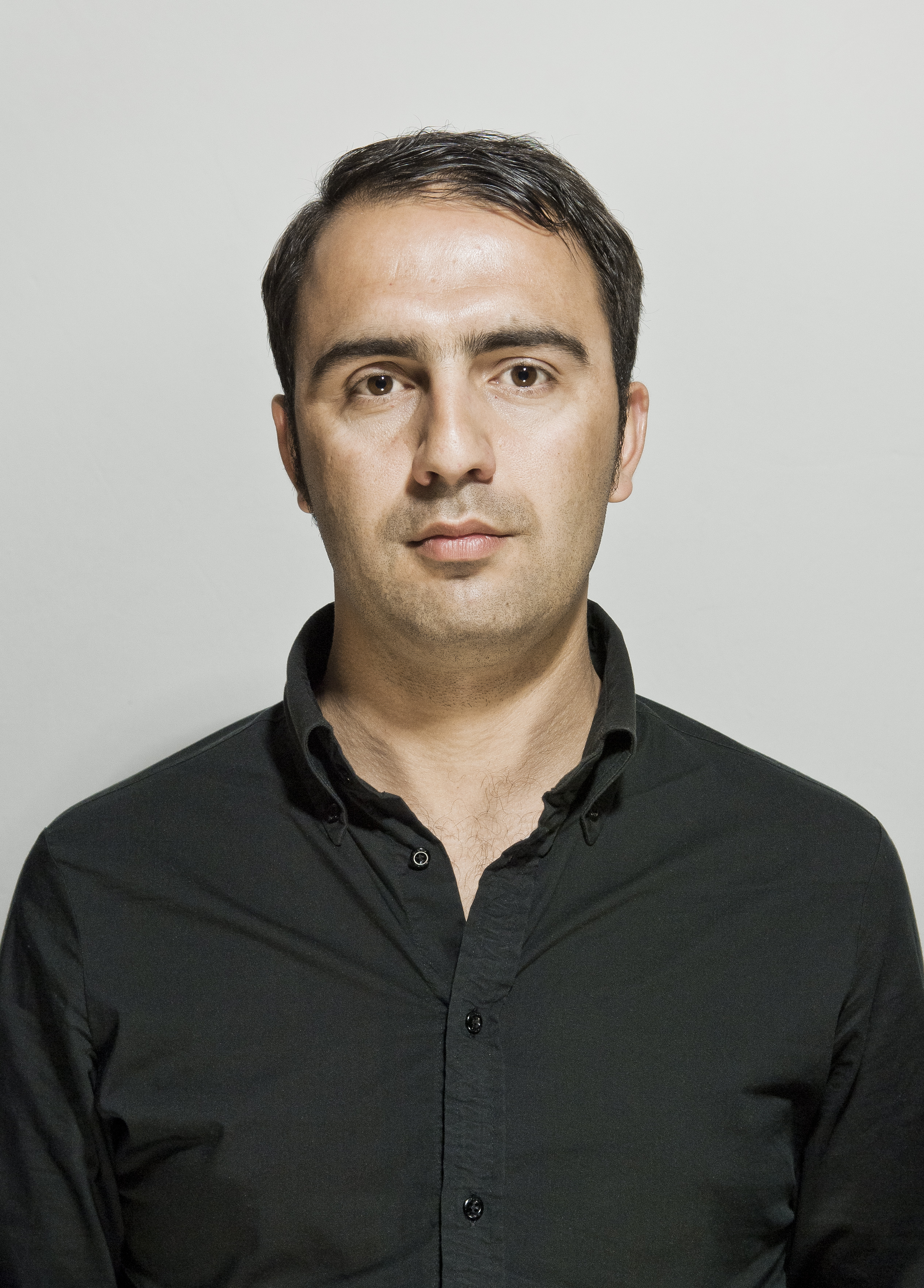
- Portrait of Arben in 2011
- Occupation: Producer

Arben Zharku is a producer based in Amsterdam, Netherlands.

== Career ==
Zharku was invited to be a voting member for the European Film Festival Awards in 2011. He held the position of the director of the Kosovo Cinematography Center but was suspended in 2021.

Zharku has produced many movies which include The Wedding Tape, Tonight Is Cancelled and Pink River.

== Awards ==
In the 2011 Abu Dhabi Film Festival, Zharku won Best Producer for his short film, The Wedding Tapes.
