= Charles Bierbauer =

American journalist (1942–2025)

- Born: July 22, 1942; Allentown, Pennsylvania, U.S.
- Died: August 29, 2025 (aged 83); Spruce Pine, North Carolina, U.S.
- Education: Emmaus High School; Pennsylvania State University
- Occupations: Academic dean and broadcast journalist
- Years active: 1962–2017
- Employer(s): University of South Carolina and CNN
- Spouse: Susanne Schafe
- Children: 4

Charles Bierbauer (July 22, 1942 – August 29, 2025) was an American journalist and television news anchor. He later worked as an academic and was dean of the College of Mass Communications and Information Studies at the University of South Carolina.

Bierbauer spent over two decades at CNN, where he served as Pentagon correspondent, senior White House correspondent for almost a decade during the Reagan and George H. W. Bush administrations, covered the U.S. Supreme Court, and was the network's senior Washington, D.C. correspondent. As a CNN correspondent, he reported on five presidential campaigns and traveled with U.S. presidents to all 50 states and over 30 nations.

== Early life and education ==
Bierbauer was born in Allentown, Pennsylvania, on July 22, 1942. He was a graduate of Emmaus High School in Emmaus, Pennsylvania, and Penn State, where he earned three degrees, a bachelor's degree in Russian, a bachelor's degree in journalism, and a master's degree in journalism. Penn State has named him a distinguished alumnus and alumni fellow.

== Career ==
In 1962, Bierbauer joined the 7217th Air Division, where he was assigned to Sinop, Turkey, serving with the U.S. Army Security Agency in 1962 and 1963. At Sinop, he was part of a cadre of young soldiers who worked wiring the remote base for radio. Bierbauer reported news, did play-by-play base sports, and hosted a jazz show. He started his commercial broadcast career as a radio reporter for WKAP radio in Allentown, Pennsylvania in 1963. He also worked in print journalism, writing for The Morning Call in Allentown.

In 1967 and 1968, he was a reporter with the Associated Press in Pittsburgh, and a Chicago Daily News correspondent in Bonn, West Germany. In 1969, he joined Group W as its Eastern Europe correspondent based in Vienna. The following year, in 1970, he transferred to Bonn, Germany, where he covered Germany and Eastern Europe. In 1974, he was appointed Group W's foreign editor based in London. In 1976, Group W assigned Bierbauer as a television reporter at KYW, its Philadelphia station, where he worked through 1977.

From 1977 to 1981, Bierbauer was a foreign correspondent for ABC News, serving as ABC's Moscow bureau chief and later as its Bonn bureau chief.

=== CNN ===
In 1981, Bierbauer joined CNN, where he was CNN's Pentagon correspondent from 1981 to 1984, its senior White House correspondent from 1984 to 1993, and its senior Washington, D.C. correspondent from 1993 to 2001. From 1997 to 2001, he covered the U.S. Supreme Court and legal affairs.

In 2001, he was a reporter and producer for Discovery Channel's documentary on the September 11 attacks.

=== University of South Carolina dean ===
In July 2002, Bierbauer was appointed the first dean of the College of Mass Communications and Information Studies at the University of South Carolina in Columbia, South Carolina, and served in this position until August 2017.

== Personal life and death ==
Bierbauer was of German descent and was married to Susanne Schafer, an Associated Press reporter and formerly AP's Pentagon correspondent. He had four children and eight grandchildren.

Bierbauer, who lived in Spruce Pine, North Carolina, after retiring, died at his home on August 29, 2025, at the age of 83.

== Awards and boards ==
In 1997, he was awarded an Emmy Award for anchoring CNN's coverage of the Centennial Olympic Park bombing in Atlanta. He was a recipient of the CableACE Award from the Association for Cable Excellence and the Overseas Press Club Award for Group W's reporting on the Yom Kippur War.

He served as a member of the National Council for Media and Public Affairs at George Washington University, and was on the advisory board for the Washington Center for Politics and Journalism. While in Washington, D.C., he was a lecturer for the Penn State program in Washington, D.C., and a member of Penn State's College of Communications Board of Visitors and the alumni association's Communications Advisory Board.

Media offices
Preceded by Position created	CNN Senior White House Correspondent; 1984–1993	Succeeded by Wolf Blitzer
