= Ann Reed =

American singer-songwriter (born 1954)

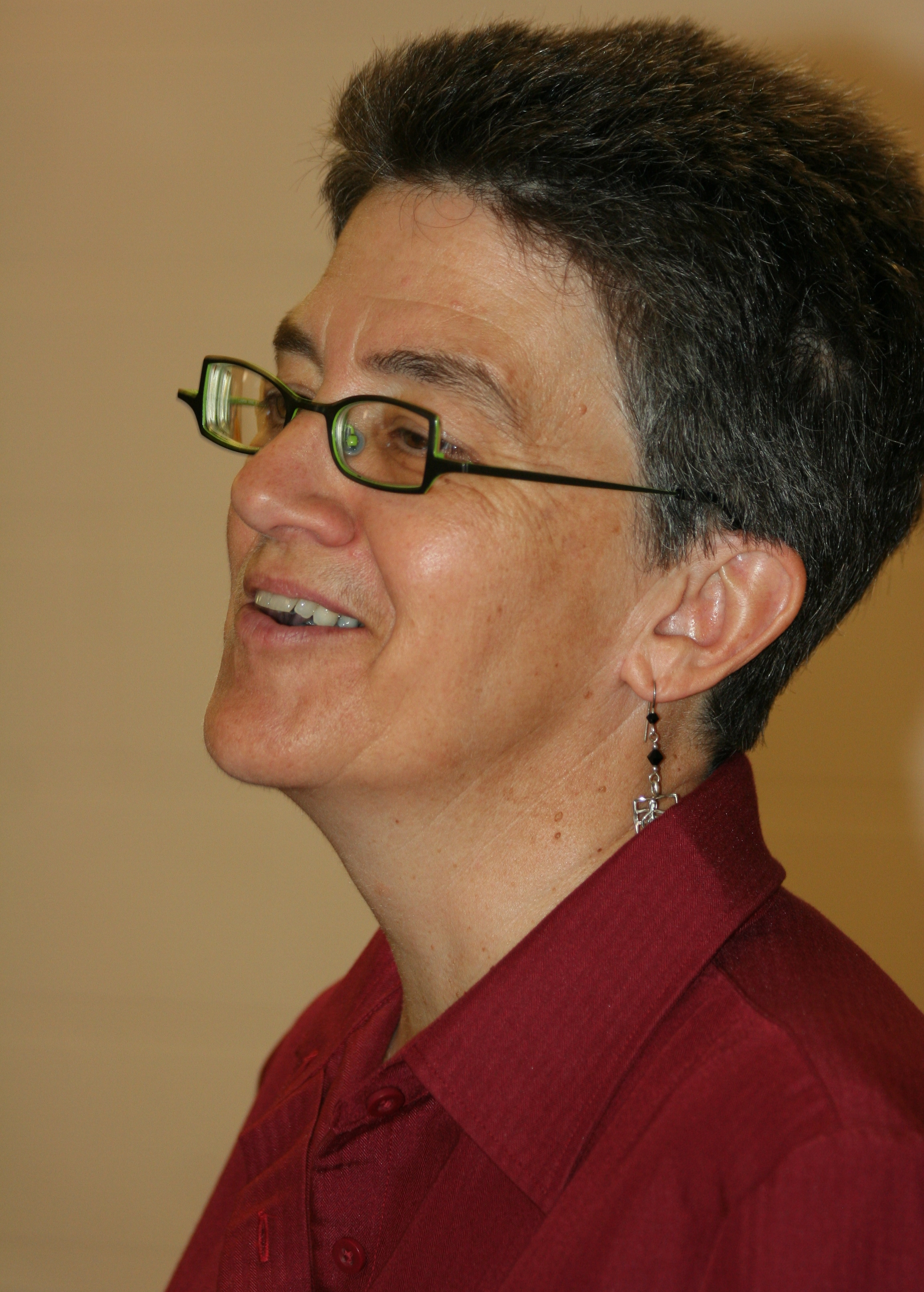
- Reed in 2011

Background information
- Born: December 1, 1954 (age 71)
- Occupation: Singer-songwriter
- Instruments: Vocals, guitar
- Website: annreed.com

Ann Reed (born December 1, 1954) is an American singer-songwriter and guitar player from Minneapolis, Minnesota. She is one of the few female guitarists who primarily play the twelve-string guitar. Reed has appeared on Good Morning America and on radio shows such as A Prairie Home Companion and The Morning Show on Minnesota Public Radio, All Things Considered, and Mountain Stage. She has performed at folk festivals including Bumbershoot and the Winnipeg Folk Festival, and continues to perform in concert.

== Career ==
Reed graduated from Minnetonka High School in 1973. She donates 25% of her concert tour bookings to charity, primarily targeting organizations that address issues affecting women and children. She has received several awards from the Minnesota Music Academy, including Songwriter of the Year and Artist of the Year.

Beyond her music, Reed has also developed her talents as a playwright and voice-over talent, creating and producing a podcast called The Henry and Buster Show. Reed first recorded independently then with Red House Records, but since the early 1990s she has produced and distributed her music through her own company, Turtlecub Productions.

Reed's first and only novel, Citizens of Campbell, was published in 2016. She remains close friends with her high school classmate Jan Malcolm, two-time Health Commissioner of Minnesota.

== Discography ==
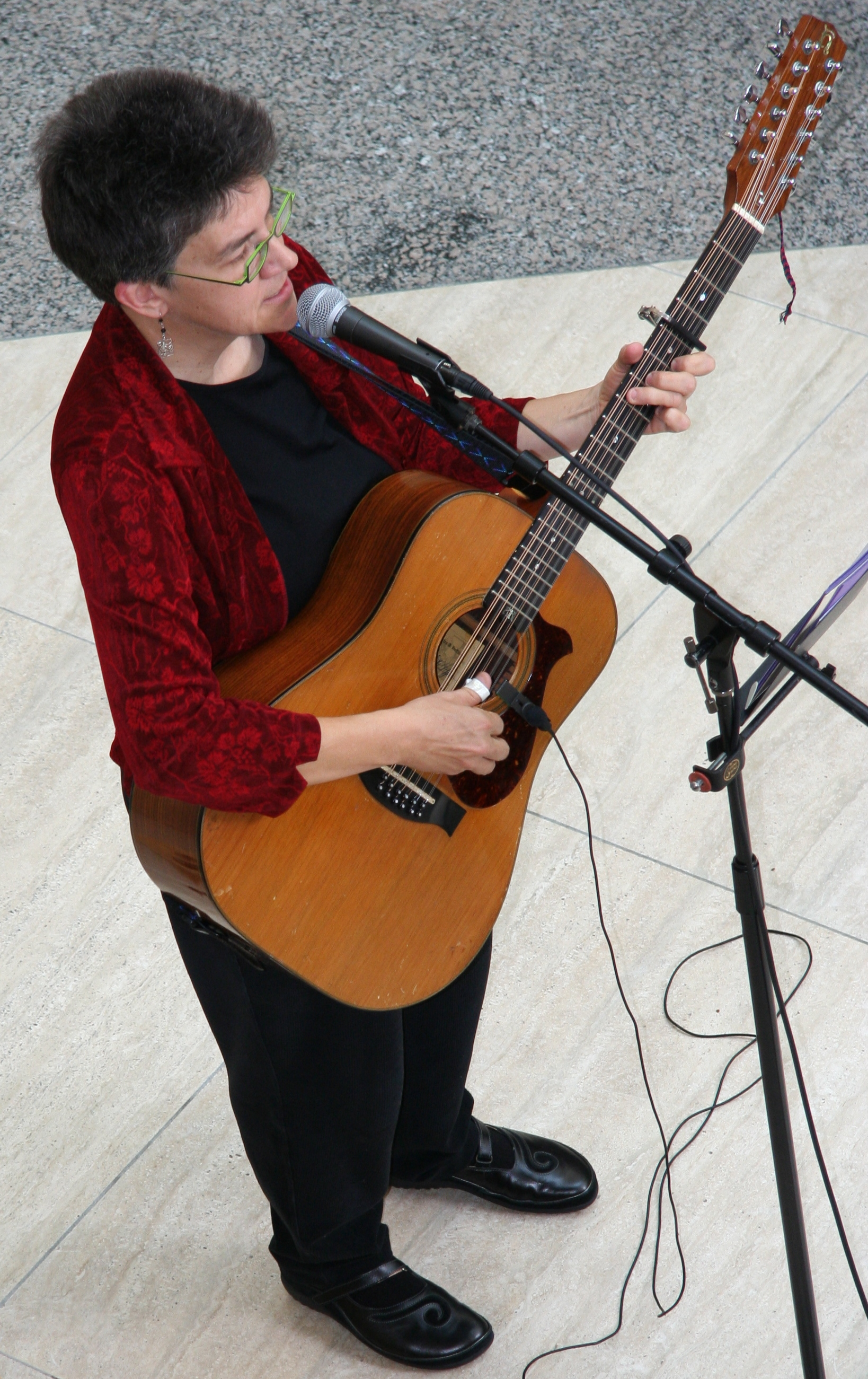
Performance at the Mayo Clinic, Rochester, Minnesota, 2009

- Carpediem (1980)
- room & board (sic) (Milwaukee: Icebergg Records, 1984)
- Just Can't Stop (LP/cassette, Red House Records, 1986)
- Talk To Me (LP/cassette/CD, Red House Records, 1990)
- Back and Forth (1990)
- Road of the Heart (1991)
- By Request (1992)
- Hole in The Day (1993)
- Life Gets Real (1995)
- Timing is Everything (1997)
- Through the Window (2000)
- Not Your Average Holiday CD (2001)
- Gift of Age (2002)
- Ann Reed Valentine's CD (2003)
- Telling Stories (2006)
- Every Long Journey : Songs for Wellness (2006)
- The State Fair Songs (2007)
- Heroes (2007)
- Songs for Minnesota (2008)
- Where the Earth Is Round (2009)
- "Eventually" (released as a single, 2011)
- "One Breath" (released as a single, 2011)
- Eventually (2013)
- Winter Springs, Summer Falls (2017)
