= Back Door Channels: The Price of Peace =

- Theatrical release poster
- Directed by: Harry Hunkele
- Produced by: Donald Tanselle; Arick Wierson; Matthew Tollin; Vered Kollek
- Starring: Jimmy Carter; Boutros Boutros-Ghali; Henry Kissinger; Andre Azoulay; Leon Charney; Zbigniew Brzezinski; Wolf Blitzer
- Cinematography: William Fitzgerald
- Music by: Whalehawk (Jacob Sanders); Moby
- Production company: Channel Production Films
- Distributed by: FilmRise
- Release date: June 7, 2009 (Monte-Carlo Television Festival)
- Running time: 100 minutes
- Country: United States
- Language: English
- Budget: USD 1.85 million

Back Door Channels: The Price of Peace is an American documentary film about the interplay between the official government channels and the men who acted largely behind the scenes during the course of peace process between Israel and Egypt. It is directed by Harry Hunkele, and produced by Arick Wierson, Donald Tanselle, Matthew Tollin, and Vered Kollek. It was pre-released in June 2009 and officially released in October 2010. Its mainstream theatrical release in the United States was September 2011.

== Synopsis ==
The film traces the confluence of factors that made the 1979 Peace Treaty between Israel and Egypt possible. It reveals that while some, such as Carter, Begin and Sadat, were driven by deeply held ideas of faith and conviction, others were military hawks who in their later years came to see peace as the only viable option; still others saw peace and stability in business terms. Regardless of their motives, these heroes found a way to come together and drive the peace process. The term "back door channels" has been in use since the early 1950s by government and foreign policy officials and intelligence operatives to refer to alternative methods for communicating across borders by using lines of communication not available to traditional official governmental and diplomatic entities or to covert international intelligence agents.

The film contains songs by Moby and his album Wait For Me.

== Opening sequence ==
The film begins with a sequence that combines historical footage with computer-generated imagery (CGI) to set the historical stage for the story. The segment was co-produced by Hunkele, executive producer Arick Wierson and the film's artistic director, Rolan LeBreton. Critic Michael O'Regan hails the animated sequence as "an exceptionally accomplished opening sequence (which inventively surmises millennia of enmity between Jews and Muslims in the Middle East in a mere 4 min)" Jay Weissberg, writing for Variety, dismisses the sequence as "a ridiculous potted history of Israel from Genesis to the state's foundation in 1948 (all in 5 min)." Vanessa McMahton, filing for Fest21, thought the effects were one of the film's strong suits: "The film is both poetic and informative interlacing art and CGI effects which add to the story aesthetically and descriptively." The sequence can be viewed online.

== Reviews ==
After announcing that the film would officially debut in Abu Dhabi in late 2010, only weeks after President Obama's historic speech in Cairo, there was much anticipation surrounding the film. Reviews were mixed. Variety hailed the film as an "enthralling dissection of the unlikely path to the groundbreaking treaty" but later conceded that director Harry Hunkele "bites off more than he can chew." Film critic Michael O’Regan called the film "an original addition to the political documentary canon", although he goes on to say that its popular (i.e. commercial) appeal may be limited: "its greatest audience may well be found amongst academics."

== Release ==
Back Door Channels: the Price of Peace has an unusually long release schedule.

An early-cut version of Back Door Channels was selected to open the 2009 Monte-Carlo Television Festival in an invitation-only royal screening on June 7, 2009 at the Grimaldi Forum in Monaco in the presence of Albert II, Prince of Monaco.

The film made its official World Premiere at the Abu Dhabi Film Festival, otherwise known as the Middle Eastern International Film Festival in October 2010. It was chosen to screen at the 2011 Cannes Film Festival.

On June 21, 2011, Fisher Klingenstein Films announced that it had bought up world-wide rights to Back Door Channels for an undisclosed sum. It also announced a US theatrical in select cities, following its premier in New York City on Sept. 16, 2011. Other cities with theaters scheduled include: Los Angeles, San Francisco, Chicago, Cleveland, Boston and Philadelphia.
