= Minnetonka High School =

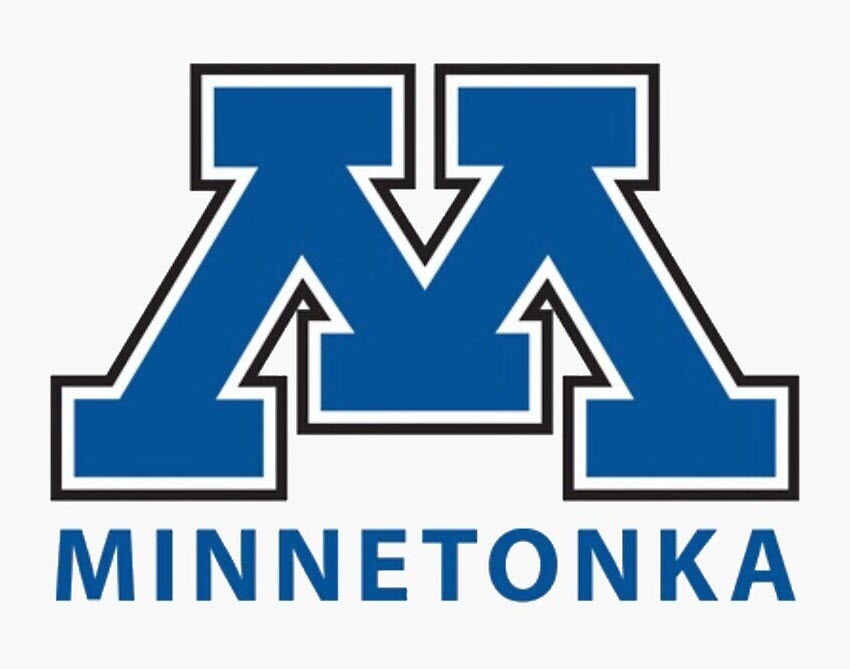

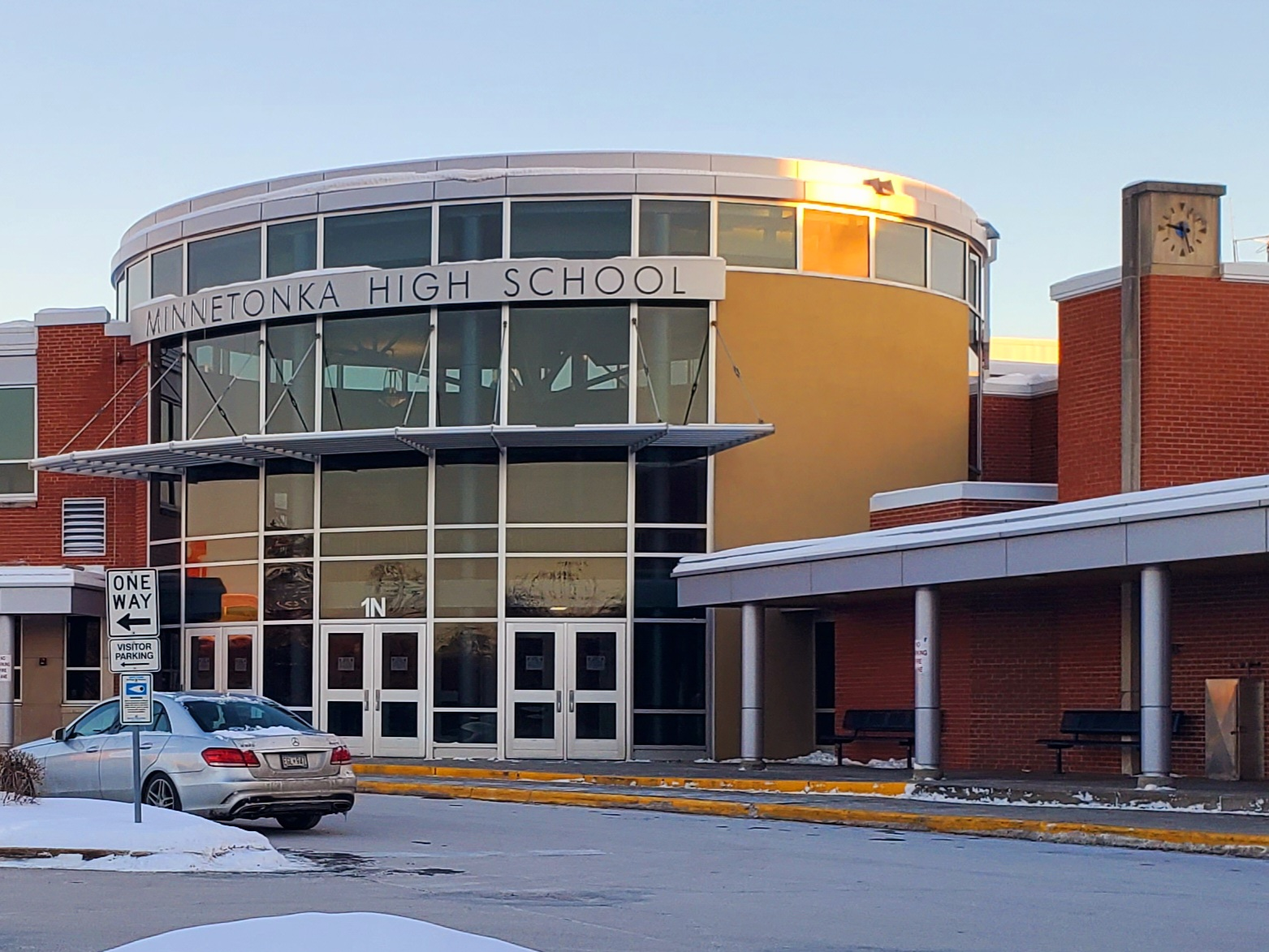
- Main entrance

Location
- Minnetonka, Minnesota; United States; 44°54′33″N 93°30′41″W

Information
- Type: Public
- Teaching staff: 192.30 (FTE)
- Enrollment: 3,482 (2023–2024)
- Student to teacher ratio: 18.11
- Colors: Blue and white
- Nickname: Skippers
- Website: www.minnetonkaschools.org/schools/high-school/mhs

Minnetonka High School is a four-year public high school in Minnetonka, Minnesota, United States, a western suburb of Minneapolis-St. Paul. The school's enrollment area comprises western Minnetonka, northern Chanhassen, Deephaven, Excelsior, Greenwood, Shorewood, Tonka Bay, Woodland, northern Victoria, and northern Eden Prairie. The school serves ninth through twelfth grade, and is Minnetonka School District's only high school.

Newsweek ranked the school 123rd on its list of America's Top High Schools. Niche ranked it 3rd among Minnesota public high schools.

== History ==
Minnetonka High School was built in 1952, when the now defunct Excelsior and Deephaven High Schools merged. In 1963, the silo (home to numerous science classrooms) was built, and in 2000 the Arts Center was added. Previous mascots included a octopus and a duck.

In 2022, the Minnetonka School Board approved construction of a new building for the Vantage and Momentum programs.

== Demographics ==
Minnetonka High School has the second-largest enrollment of any Minnesota high school, behind neighboring Lake Conference rival Wayzata High School. As of 2026, the school has a student population of 3,482 that is 0.1% Pacific Islander, 0.2% Native American, 5% black, 5.6% Hispanic, 6.3% multiracial, 7.6% Asian, and 75.1% white. Minnetonka School District's catchment area has a population of 53,000 and is characterized as a bedroom community. It is predominantly white, with a strong Scandinavian influence, and is considered one of the state's most affluent areas.

== Specialty programs ==
The school offers several different advanced programs for students interested in pre-professional, trades, scientific, and writing tracks.

Founded in 2012, the VANTAGE program is an advanced professional studies program that offers career tracks in business analytics, design and marketing, global business, global sustainability, health sciences, international relations, multimedia communications, public policy, user experience design, and education. Groups of students partner with businesses in the region to work on problems those business are dealing with. The program includes one‑on‑one mentorship by local professionals.

The Momentum program began in the 2020–21 school year and offers courses in aviation, automotive, construction, and design. Students work on their own projects, gain on-site field experience, and learn skills in fields such as electrical, plumbing, and HVAC systems. Aviation students can fly with instructors during discovery flights and use flight simulators to learn basic skills.

Minnetonka Research is a scientific research program that began in 2016 and allows students to conduct their own independent research projects. It connects students with mentors from industry and universities. Since 2017, the school has hosted Research Symposiums, where often more than 40 students present their work. Past students' projects have qualified for the Minnesota State Science & Engineering Fair, the Northern Central Junior Science and Humanities Symposium, and the Regeneron International Science and Engineering Fair.

The Writing Center is a school program where students get help with writing. It is staffed by trained student coaches and teachers who work one-on-one with students, and has held events, such as "Off the Page", to show writing in different jobs. Former students occasionally return to help students with assignments, including work for the International Baccalaureate program.

== Athletics ==
Minnetonka High School is part of the Lake Conference in the Minnesota State High School League. The school mascot is a Skipper.

State Championships
Season	Sport	Number of Championships	Year
Fall	Tennis, Girls	4	1974, 1975, 2021, 2022
Fall	Soccer, Girls	3	2001, 2013, 2018
Fall	Cross Country Running, Girls	4	1981, 1982, 1991, 2004
Fall	Volleyball, Girls	1	1976
Fall	Football	1	2004
Fall	Marching Band	1	2016
Fall	Swimming and Diving, Girls	4	1975, 1976, 2021, 2024
Winter	Alpine Skiing, Boys	6	1996, 1998, 2000, 2012, 2017, 2018
Winter	Alpine Skiing, Girls	5	1987, 1993, 2011, 2013, 2014
Winter	Wrestling	1	1974
Winter	Hockey, Girls	3	2011, 2012, 2013
Winter	Hockey, Boys	2	2018, 2023
Winter	Swimming and Diving, Boys	11	1978, 1988, 1990, 1991, 1992, 1993, 1996, 1997, 2011, 2017, 2018
Winter	Basketball, Boys	4	1965, 1998, 2008, 2024
Winter	Basketball, Girls	2	2016, 2024
	Cheerleading, Girls	27	2009, 2010, 2012, 2013, 2014, 2015, 2016, 2017, 2019, 2020, 2021, 2023, 2024
Spring	Tennis, Boys	3	1974, 2016, 2017
Spring	Softball, Girls	2	1999, 2000
Spring	Lacrosse, Boys	1	2009
Spring	Track and Field, Boys	2	1976, 2012
Spring	Track and Field, Girls	8	1983, 1985, 1986, 1989, 1992, 2013, 2014, 2018
Spring	Rugby union, Boys	3	2004, 2005, 2018
Spring	Adapted Bowling	3	2006, 2007, 2008
Total		101	

== Feeder schools ==
- Elementary schools
  - Clear Springs Elementary
  - Deephaven Elementary School
  - Excelsior Elementary School
  - Groveland Elementary
  - Minnewashta Elementary School
  - Scenic Heights Elementary
- Middle schools
  - Minnetonka Middle School East
  - Minnetonka Middle School West

== Notable alumni ==
- Nancy Parsons (1960), actress
- Lee Blessing (1967), playwright
- Steve Comer (1972), Major League Baseball (MLB) pitcher
- Eric Bischoff (1973), entrepreneur, television producer, professional wrestling booker, and podcast host
- Ann Reed (1973), folk singer and songwriter
- Jan Malcolm (1973), Health Commissioner of Minnesota
- Keith Nord (1975), National Football League (NFL) player
- Thomas O. Staggs (1978), Chief Operating Officer, The Walt Disney Company
- David Wheaton (1988), professional tennis player
- Peter A. Selfridge (1989), United States Chief of Protocol from 2014 to 2017
- Arick Wierson (1990), film and television producer
- Jim Brower (1991), MLB pitcher
- Dmitry Chaplin (2000), dancer and choreographer
- Will Leer (2003), professional runner
- Jake Gardiner (2008), professional hockey player
- Justin Holl (2010), professional hockey player
- Haley Kalil (2010), Sports Illustrated model
- Beau Allen (2010), NFL player
- Ryan McCartan (2011), film and Broadway actor
- John Mark Nelson (2012), songwriter and producer
- Vinni Lettieri (2012), professional hockey player
- Sidney Morin (2013), professional hockey player and Olympic gold medalist
- Matthew Wilkinson (2017), professional runner
- Bobby Brink (2018), professional hockey player
- Ryan Lambert (2020), baseball player
- Rory Guilday (2021), professional hockey player and Olympic gold medalist
- K'Andre Miller, professional hockey player
- Terry Katzman, producer, sound engineer, archivist, and record-store owner
