= Yasmin Fedda =

Palestinian filmmaker, artist and academic

- Fedda in 2020
- Education: University of Edinburgh; University of Manchester, Granada Centre for Visual Anthropology
- Occupations: Filmmaker and academic
- Employer: Queen Mary University of London
- Notable work: Breadmakers (2007); Queens of Syria (2014; Ayouni (2020)
- Website: yasminfedda.com

Yasmin Fedda is a Palestinian filmmaker, artist, creative producer, and academic, based in the United Kingdom. She is most noted as a documentary film director, producer and programmer, and has taught with film organisations, NGOs and universities internationally. She was a co-founder of the project Highlight Arts, UK, which works with artists in times of conflict.

Her films have won awards and been screened at international festivals including the Sundance Film Festival and the Edinburgh Film Festival, as well as being broadcast by the BBC and Al Jazeera English. Fedda is a senior lecturer in film at Queen Mary University of London.

== Background ==
Yasmin Fedda holds an M.A. in social anthropology from the University of Edinburgh, an M.A. in visual anthropology from the University of Manchester's Granada Centre for Visual Anthropology, and a Ph.D. by practice in Transdisciplinary Documentary film from the University of Edinburgh.

Having spent a year as a support worker at the Garvald Edinburgh bakery, she made the short documentary film Breadmakers (2007), which had an acclaimed reception, being named as best short documentary at the Middle East International Film Festival and was nominated for a BAFTA for best short Scottish documentary of 2007. Her 2014 film Queens of Syria also won the Black Pearl award at the Abu Dhabi Film Festival. It is a documentary that follows a theatre project run with Syrian refugee women in Amman, where they are in the final rehearsals of staging a new version of Euripides's tragedy, The Trojan Women, interwoven with their own experiences of war.

Fedda's 2020 film Ayouni premiered at CPH:DOX in 2020. Described by Peter Bradshaw in The Guardian as "a powerful and urgent documentary tribute", Ayouni focuses on Bassel Safadi and Paolo Dall'Oglio, both "forcibly disappeared" in Syria, Bassel's wife Noura Ghazi Safadi, and Machi, Paolo's sister. In 2024, Fedda's interactive installation The Pathogen of War premiered at CPH:DOX, and also that year she made the feature-length film How We Work, with 39 filmmakers across the world.

Fedda has been a participant in a variety of conferences and her work has been widely shown at festivals, on television and in galleries around the world, including at the Sundance Film Festival, the Edinburgh Film Festival, the Copenhagen International Documentary Film Festival, the Glasgow Film Festival, the Carthage Film Festival, the Dublin Film Festival, and the Abu Dhabi Film Festival.

She is a co-founder of the Highlight Arts project, "which brings together a diverse array of artists, writers, photographers and others to explore the stories of and to give voice to those affected by war, environmental disaster and other forms of conflict", making use of residencies, workshops and labs, translations and collaborations.

== Filmography ==
=== Features ===
- 2012: A Tale of Two Syrias
- 2014: Queens of Syria
- 2020: Ayouni
- 2024: How We Work
- 2024: The Pathogen of War (interactive installation)

=== Short films ===
- 2004: Milking the Desert
- 2007: Breadmakers
- 2009: Moving Pictures
- 2011: Waiting for Spring
- 2013: Siamo Tornati/We are Back
- 2015: Abu Hawash
- 2015: Found in Translation
- 2015: Rebel Geeks: Steal from the Capitalists
- 2020: Blink and You'll Miss Us

== Selected writings ==
- (with Daniel Gorman) "Cinema of Defiance", Critical Muslim, 11.2, 2015.
- (with Daniel Gorman and Tory Davidson) Creation and Displacement – Developing New Narratives Around Migration, IETM – International Network for Contemporary Performing Arts, 2016
- "Filming the Invisible", New Lines Magazine, 28 October 2020.
- "Am I still a filmmaker?", Raising Films, 2021
- "Time, grief, and hope on film", HAU: Journal of Ethnographic Theory, 2022
- (with Daniel Gorman) "Three Nights in Free Syria", The Markaz Review, 24 January 2025.
- (co-written chapters) "Researching protracted displacement" and "A new political economy of displacement", in Refugees in a World Without Aid (edited by Ceri Oeppen, Ali Ali, Michael Collyer, Priya Deshingkar, Anne-Meike Fechter, and Tahir Zaman), Open Press, University of Sussex, 2025.

== Awards ==
- 2004: One World Broadcasting Trust award, Milking the Desert
- 2006: Debut competition Jury Prize, Moscow Visual Anthropology Film Festival, Milking the Desert
- 2007: BAFTA nomination for best short film, Breadmakers
- 2007: Scottish Short Film Award, Edinburgh International Film Festival, Breadmakers
- 2008: Best Short Film, Emotions Film Festival, Greece, Breadmakers
- 2008: Black Pearl Short Documentary Award, Middle East Film Festival, Abu Dhabi, Breadmakers
- 2008: Palme Dewar Award, Heartland Film Society, Breadmakers
- 2009: Special Jury Mention, Gdansk DocFilm Festival, Breadmakers
- 2014: Black Pearl for Best Director from Arab World, Abu Dhabi Film Festival, Queens of Syria
- 2014: Special mention from the UNHCR, Human Screen Film Festival, Tunis, Queens of Syria
- 2015: Best Documentary Film Award, Salé International Festival of Women's Film, Morocco, Queens of Syria
- 2015: Prix Safi Faye CREDIF (UNESCO), Best Female Director, Carthage Film Festival, Queens of Syria
- 2015: Tanit de bronze for Best Documentary, Carthage Film Festival, Queens of Syria
- 2015: UNHCR/CONARE Director Prize, CineMigrante Festival, Argentina, Queens of Syria
- 2016: Audience Award for Best Documentary Feature, Twin Cities Arab Film Festival, Minneapolis, Queens of Syria
- 2016: Best Documentary Feature, Twin Cities Arab Film Festival, Minneapolis, Queens of Syria
- 2021: Commendation, RAI Film Prize, Royal Anthropological Institute Film Festival
- 2022: Eurimage Award, for Best Prototype for The Pathogen of War at CPH:DOX
