= Keith Nord =

American football player (1957–2018)

No. 49
- Position: Safety

Personal information
- Born: March 13, 1957; Minnetonka, Minnesota, U.S.
- Died: September 19, 2018 (aged 61); Orono, Minnesota, U.S.
- Listed height: 6 ft 0 in (1.83 m)
- Listed weight: 197 lb (89 kg)

Career information
- High school: Minnetonka High School
- College: St. Cloud State University
- NFL draft: 1979: undrafted

Career history
- Minnesota Vikings (1979–1985)

Career NFL statistics
- Interceptions: 1
- Forced fumbles: 6
- Sacks: 3
- Stats at Pro Football Reference

Keith Sterling Nord (March 3, 1957 – September 19, 2018) was an American professional football defensive back in the National Football League (NFL). He played for the Minnesota Vikings from 1979 to 1985.

== Early life ==
Nord was born on 13 March 1957 in Minnetonka, Minnesota. As a teenager, Nord played football for Minnetonka High School.

== Career ==
=== 1975-1979: Collegiate football career ===
Nord played college football at St. Cloud State University. He was a member of the All-Conference and District 13 team, and a four-time letterwinner in football. During his senior season in 1979, he was voted both team captain and most valuable player. He won St. Cloud State's NIC Glen Galligan Award, awarded to a player who achieved high academic accomplishment across their four years at the university. In 1989, he was voted into the SCSU Athletic Hall of Fame.

=== 1979-1985: NFL career ===
In the 1979 NFL Draft, Nord went undrafted. After the draft, however, the Minnesota Vikings sent him an invitation to attend their team tryouts. Although relatively small in stature, Nord was an intense player. His teammate and former Vikings punter Greg Coleman later stated that, "I remember Chuck Foreman coming through the line, and Keith popped him. And I mean, he popped him good. And Chuck jumped up and said, 'Hey rookie,' and the two had words. But Keith did not back down...And immediately I thought, 'You know what? This rookie from Minnetonka, he's going to be all right.'"

In the beginning, Nord played as one of the Vikings' reserve defensive players and occasional kick returner. He totaled 18 returns for 342 yards and one touchdown. In his first four seasons, he led the Vikings special teams in tackles. During 1980, he returned a kickoff 70 yards for a touchdown. Vikings coach Bud Grant took note of Nord's success, and, in the 1983 season, he was named special teams captain. He was the first Minnesota native to earn that honor. During that season, Nord got both an interception and a sack. His season ended early that year, as both Nord and his teammate Tommy Kramer suffered torn ligaments during the September 18 game against the Tampa Bay Buccaneers and required season-ending surgeries. In 1985, he was voted by his peers to be the Vikings' recipient of the Ed Block Courage Award. In total, Nord spent seven seasons with the Vikings.

=== 1985-2018: Post-football career, community involvement ===
After retiring from football in 1985, Nord worked as a motivational speaker to schools, businesses, and churches. He was very involved in his broader community, and was selected to be the March of Dimes Citizen Athlete and the Muscular Dystrophy Citizen Athlete. In 2013, he was inducted into Minnetonka High School's Skippers Hall of Fame.

In the late 2000s, publicity around the effects of chronic traumatic encephalopathy (CTE) on former NFL athletes became widespread. Nord was one of nearly 4,500 former NFL players that sued the NFL in 2012 for their role in players' heavy brain damage. The case was eventually settled for $765 million the following year.

Nord died of stomach cancer on 19 September 2018.
