= Harry Hunkele =

American film director

Harry Hunkele is an American Film and Television Director, Producer and Editor. He is a ten-time Emmy Award winning television director and producer and is the director of the feature documentary Back Door Channels: The Price of Peace (Channel Productions, 2011).

== Biography ==
Hunkele was born in rural Vermont, and came to New York City in the early 1980s. After spending many years in and around television and commercial production, in 2003, he joined the upstart network NYC Media, the brainchild of the administration of billionaire-turned-Mayor Michael Bloomberg. Soon after signing on, then network Head of Production Seth Unger asked Hunkele to produce a documentary series entitled Blueprint NYC, which highlighted local architectural and historical aspects of New York City iconography. At the same time, Hunkele was playing double-duty, also showrunning $9.99 a popular reality show that airs in New York on local station WNBC.

In 2005, Hunkele was given a new assignment by then General Manager Arick Wierson - Secrets of New York. Hunkele helped turn the show into one of the all-time most nominated and winning documentary series in New York City history. Starring Kelly Choi, the series aired nationally on PBS and has been widely recognized for its novel and innovative approach to the television documentary format. With digital graphics and animations, stylized 3D recreations, heavy metal and electronica original and canned use of songs and musical scores, writing, and a compelling subject matter, the show has widely become the signature production of NYC Media.

The program traditionally dominated the New York Emmy Awards across several categories. In Season Three, the show went from a half-hour format to one-hour specials.
