= Robin Mitchell =

British writer

Robin Mitchell is a Scottish writer and producer.

== Career ==
Mitchell co-founded Edinburgh's Cadies & Witchery Tours in 1984. The name 'Cadies' was taken from the 18th-century Edinburgh 'Caddies'. The Scottish actor Kevin McKidd worked at The Cadies and Witchery Tours in Edinburgh while studying drama at Queen Margaret University.

In May 1985, Mitchell and Macphail were Lothian Region winners of the Shell LiveWIRE Young Business Competition. He featured in the LiveWIRE magazine in 2012.

In August 1988, Mitchell bought at auction a calling card case made out of skin taken from the back of the left hand of the infamous bodysnatcher William Burke (of Burke and Hare fame). The calling card case for many years was loaned to the Police Information Centre in Edinburgh's Royal Mile. It is now displayed in The Cadies & Witchery Tours shop (aka The William Burke Museum) in Edinburgh's West Bow. In 1997 the calling card case featured as part of the Wellcome Trust's exhibition Dr Death: Medicine at the End of Life. The calling card case featured on the BBC's Antiques Roadshow in May 2007 with Michael Aspel and on the Channel 4 show Four Rooms on Wednesday 25 April 2012.

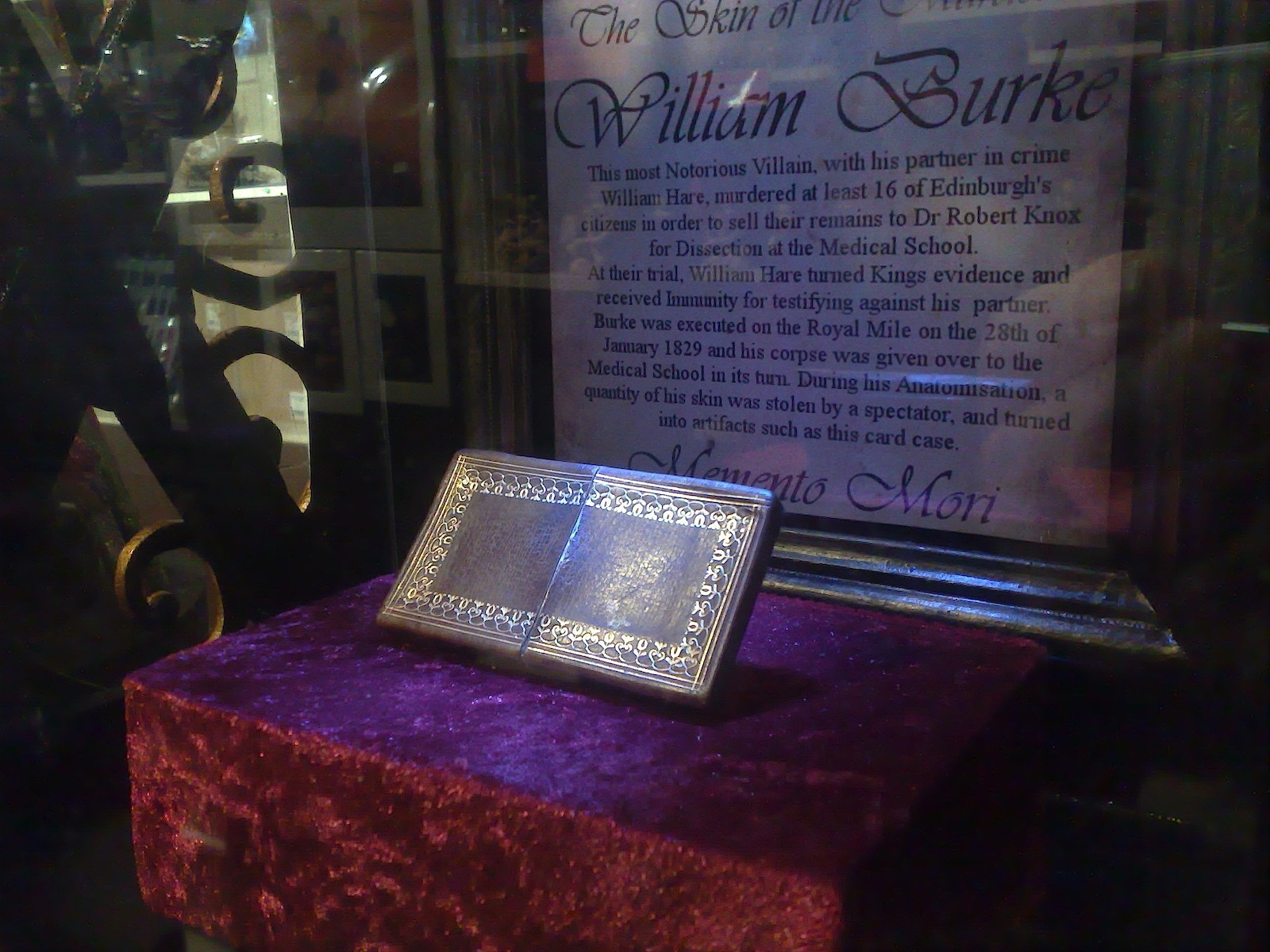
Calling Card Case made out of the skin of ‘bodysnatcher’ William Burke

The Cadies & Witchery Tours were presented with commendation by Bill Heron Trophy 1990 for outstanding contribution to Scottish Tourism – Highly Commended and in 1992 The Cadies & Witchery Tours were awarded runner up in the Small Business Marketing category of the Scottish Tourist Board's Scottish Thistle Awards for Tourism.

A Ghoulish Delight was the title of a case study written by Dr. Keith Halcro in 1995 about The Cadies & Witchery Tours. It was compiled while Halcro was a lecturer at Queen Margaret University, prior to his present role as senior lecturer at Glasgow Caledonian University. The case study was joint winner of the 1995 Scottish Enterprise. New Case Writing Competition.

In August 2009, Mitchell was selected to appear on the Fourth Plinth in Trafalgar Square London as part of Antony Gormley's One and Other art project.

In March 2017, Robin presented the Loretto Lecture entitled "Dead For A Living" at Pinkie House, Loretto School, Musselburgh. Previous speakers at the now well-established lecture series have included peace activist Colin Parry, Edinburgh artist Richard Demarco, former Secretary of State for Scotland Michael Moore, and broadcaster and journalist Lesley Riddoch.

Mitchell's published books include Adam Lyal's Witchery Tales, Grave Robbers, What's Under the Kilt?, Princess Pumpalot (The Farting Princess) and Princess Pumpalot: The Super-Farting Bean Mystery. He has also written comedy sketches for BBC Radio Scotland.

Mitchell's has written the following stage plays: Princess Pumpalot (The Farting Princess), Princess Pumpalot: The Quest for the Purple Super-Farting Bean, May I Have The Bill, Please?, and Princess Pumpalot: The Ghostly Farting Monk Hunt.

Mitchell's has produced several films including Adam Lyal's Royal Mile (1994, 55 mins, Director: Laurence Wareing), Georgian Edinburgh: Tales of the New Town (1995, 55 mins, Director: Laurence Wareing), St. Andrews: Ghost, Gowns & Golfers (1996, 51 mins, Director: Ted Brocklebank), The Ghosts of Scotland (1997, 55 mins, Director: Pete Wolsey), And So Goodbye (2004, 24 mins, Director: Jim Hickey), The Rest is Silence (2005, 11 mins, Director: Andrew T. Henderson), Finding Bob McArthur (2007, 75 mins, Director: Jim Hickey), Breadmakers (2007, 11 mins, Director. Yasmin Fedda), The Scottish Parliament: Following the Ghost Road (2007, 35 mins, Director: Robin Mitchell), William McLaren – An Artist Out of Time (2009, 51 mins, Director: Jim Hickey), About A Band (2010, 46 mins, Director: Jim Hickey), The Download Horror (2012, 70 mins, Director: Jim Hickey) and A Tale Of Two Syrias (2012, 64 mins, Director: Yasmin Fedda).

Mitchell's television and radio appearances include Pebble Mill at One (1984, BBC 1 TV), The Jimmie Macgregor Show (1986, BBC Radio Scotland), People Show (1988, BBC 1 TV), New Venturers (1991, BBC 1 TV), Blue Peter (1992, BBC 1 TV), This Morning (1997 ITV), The Big Breakfast (1997, Channel 4), Kit And The Widow's Grand Tour (1997, BBC Radio 4), Noel's House Party (1998, BBC 1 TV), Style Challenge (1998, BBC 1 TV), Holiday (1999, BBC 1 TV), Ready Steady Cook (1999, BBC 2 TV), Four Rooms (2012, Channel 4), Near FM 90.3 FM (Dublin) (Ger Leddin) (2013), K107 FM John Murray (June 2015), The John Beattie Show (January 2017, BBC Radio Scotland) and Walking Victorian Britain (November 2021, Channel 5).

== Adam Lyal's Witchery Tour Party ==
Mitchell founded Scottish political party Adam Lyal's Witchery Tour Party in 1999. The "publicity-seeking" party stood candidates in the Lothian Region for the Scottish Parliament elections, appearing as a highwayman named Adam Lyal (deceased) and pledging to "Wear clothes and white make-up to impersonate a highwayman hanged in Scotland in 1811 at all sittings of Parliament, send MSPs on work placement to see what the real world is like and he'd only take a minimum wage, donating the rest of his salary to charity." In 1999, Mitchell received 1184 votes. In 2003, Robin Bankhead received 964 votes and in 2007, Euan MacInnes received 867 votes. The party deregistered in 2009.
