= Breadmakers =

2007 Scottish documentary

- Directed by: Yasmin Fedda
- Produced by: Jim Hickey; Robin Mitchell
- Cinematography: Veera Lehto
- Production companies: Scottish Documentary Institute; Bridging the Gap; Cadies Productions
- Release date: 2007
- Running time: 10 minutes
- Country: United Kingdom
- Language: English

Breadmakers is a 2007 short documentary film directed by Yasmin Fedda and produced by Jim Hickey and Robin Mitchell. This is a film about a unique Edinburgh bakery, where a community of workers with learning disabilities make a variety of organic breads for daily delivery to shops and cafes in the city. The Garvald Bakery is part of a centre inspired by the ideas of Rudolf Steiner, where the workers realise their potential for self-discovery and creativity in a social environment. Fedda said that she was surprised about the response that the film received.

== Awards ==
- Best Short Scottish Documentary at the 61st Edinburgh International Film Festival (2007)
- Best Short Documentary at the Middle East International Film Festival (2008)

== Nominations ==
- Best Short Film at BAFTA Scotland (2007)
