= Daniel Gorman =

Arts manager and human rights worker

- Education: University of Edinburgh, SOAS University of London
- Occupations: Arts manager and human rights worker, director of English PEN
- Employer: English PEN (2019–present)
- Known for: Executive director, Shubbak Festival (2014–19); co-founder, Highlight Arts

Daniel Gorman is an arts manager and human rights worker who, since the mid-2000s, has been involved in a broad movement linking arts and human rights, working on many projects both in the United Kingdom and the Middle East with the aim of increasing dialogue, communication and collaboration, while promoting social justice and equality through the arts.

Since 2019, Gorman has been the director of English PEN, an organisation for which the protection of human rights and freedom of expression are central. He has written for a variety of publications including The Guardian, Irish Times, and n+1 magazine, and contributed an essay to the 2014 volume Syria Speaks: Art and Culture from the Frontline (Saqi Books).

== Biography ==
Gorman holds a BS degree in Environmental Archaeology from the University of Edinburgh and an M.Sc. degree in Middle East politics from SOAS, University of London. He was the co-founder and coordinator of Arts (2007–2014), and between 2009 and 2014, was also director of the Firefly International charity, with the goal of using arts and education to break down barriers between communities in the UK, Iraq, Bosnia and Herzegovina, Syria, Lebanon and Palestine. A Salzburg Global Fellow, Gorman was a participant in 2014 at the Salzburg Global Seminar (in the "Conflict Transformation through Culture: Peace-Building and the Arts" session), his father Michael Gorman having also been a Salzburg participant 64 years earlier.

From 2014 to 2019, Gorman was executive director of the arts festival Shubbak, which grew to become the largest festival in Europe focusing on contemporary Arab culture, and he co-founded Highlight Arts, which organised international arts festivals and events in the UK, working with writers in Pakistan, Iraq, Lebanon and Syria. He is a National Arts Strategies "Chief Executive Officer: Community and Culture" 2015 fellow and a British Council Cultural Leadership International scholar.

In August 2019, Gorman joined English PEN as director. In this role, he has been connected with many initiatives and collaborations related to human rights, including helping to explore the themes of the CILIP Conference 2024, the focus of which was "intellectual freedom and its associated themes of freedom of expression, censorship and information rights".

Gorman stated: "Back in 2014 I was working on a tour of Syrian authors to the UK (including the wonderful and much missed Khaled Khalifa). We were honoured to present that tour in partnership with English PEN, that was my first proper introduction to the organisation, and following various partnerships when I was co-director of the Shubbak Festival, I became more and more engaged in the organisation. There's no other organisation like PEN, working at that intersection of literature and human rights, and the more I found out about the history of PEN, the details of the PEN Charter, the more intrigued I became."

Gorman also serves as a trustee of Highlight Arts and Action for Hope.
