= Hans Schauder =

Hans Schauder (22 November 1911, Vienna – 10 July 2001 in Edinburgh) was a British medical adviser and counsellor, co-founder of Camphill Community, and founder of Garvald School & Training Centre.

== Childhood and youth ==
Hans Schauder was born in Vienna of assimilated Jewish parents, a Polish father and Austrian mother. He remembered learning the Lord’s Prayer from a housemaid his family employed. School life, which began for him in the Scottish School in the Old City, introduced Schauder to the joys of music, art and literature. He embraced all the joys of the arts, music and literature that Vienna had to offer. The love of the art and nature, and an insatiable desire for knowledge remained throughout his life. He had also a deep concern for human beings, their troubles and difficulties. Already as a boy, people confided in him, or would ask for advice because of his ability to listen with sympathy and understanding. He and his friends spent much time climbing in the mountains, reading plays together, singing and making music.

As a child, he had wanted to become a monk. Later, at the Wasa-Gymnasium, he met his friends Rudi Lissau, Edi Weissberg and Bronja Hüttner, through whom he met and fell in love with Lisl Schwalb, a fellow Viennese Jew. Through them came into touch with Anthroposophy, which opened up a path to spiritual knowledge and understanding as a result of which he no longer desired the monastic life but decided to become a doctor. At the age of 20, he enrolled at the University of Vienna’s school of medicine, and at 22 met Dr Karl König in Arlesheim, at a conference for medical students before König moved to Vienna. When he did, Hans joined the youth group around him that included most of his friends and who stayed in contact through most of their lives and between them started many initiatives.

== Immigration to the UK ==
Although he had by this time converted to Christianity, in 1938 Schauder’s Jewish background forced him to flee Austria after its annexation by the Nazis. A few weeks previously, Lisl had also left, finding sanctuary with a Quaker couple near Aberdeen. Schauder struggled to complete his degree, living in poverty and suffering chronic chest problems.

Though many of his family and friends died in concentration camps and he himself suffered both physically and psychologically, struggling with his health for the rest of his life, he never became embittered or lost his trusting and open nature, which always looked for and fostered the best in people. He was convinced that in order to be a positive influence in the world one must not only do good, but also be active on a spiritual dimension. Those who strengthen their inner being through prayer and meditation do not wage war or hate other nations.

== Camphill and Garvald ==
In Vienna when Schauder and his fiancé had joined the group of young, idealistic people led by Dr Karl Koenig, their dream was to found a community in which they could live on an equal footing with people in need of special care. This became a reality in Scotland. Here, after completing his medical studies in Basle, Schauder and his young wife joined the group of founders of the Camphill Community near Aberdeen that was to become the nucleus of a worldwide organisation and was a model of community living. While at Camphill, their twin girls were born and not long afterwards another daughter.

In 1944, Schauder left Camphill to start a new anthroposophical community, Garvald School and Training Centre, near West Linton together with others from the Camphill group, turning an empty mansion house into the centre of a vibrant community. Though he was the medical doctor at Garvald, Schauder did everything from cleaning and cooking to singing lessons and Bible study. Then in 1949, after five years, Schauder and his family left to settle in nearby Edinburgh. He had been diagnosed with Tuberculosis and for some time Lisl had to support the family while he was recovering. Thereafter, he became the medical adviser at another anthroposophical organisation, the Rudolf Steiner School, Edinburgh. It was a welcome breathing space within the peaceful environment of his own home as opposed to the bustle of community living and there Schauder developed faculties that focused on the individual and his or her deeper problems.

Already in Garvald, people had recognised Schauder’s diagnostic abilities and assessment of young people with neurotic or psychotic traits or those in crisis situations. Both colleagues and others in the medical profession acknowledged his creative and unusual way of working, inspired by the image of the illness and the challenges that it presented.

== Counselling work ==
In the late fifties, Schauder expanded his work to wider social problems, volunteering to counsel prisoners at Edinburgh’s Saughton Prison, advising Samaritans staff on problem case, counselling parents on their children’s problems and progressing to doing adult counselling. In doing so he developed his own unique approach to counselling – an attempt to build up as complete a picture as possible of the client so as to fully identify with them and together work towards a solution. After years of experience, he met a Dominican friar, Marcus Lefébure who also worked as a counsellor at the university. The two men analysed the structure of Schauder’s therapeutic approach, gradually pinpointing the archetypal elements in the interview process. These are described in their book, Conversation and Counselling, published in 1982. The book won high praise in the United Kingdom, was later translated into German. “These dialogues present counselling as a form of contemporary spirituality, arguing that counselling facilitates spiritual experience and that psychoanalytic and psychotherapeutic concepts can be understood in spiritual terms. However, the dialogues also present a critique of the authorisation of subjectivity within both counselling and spirituality; in so doing, they anticipate and elaborate later criticisms of Paul Heelas and Linda Woodhead's spiritual revolution thesis.” After the appearance of the book, people would visit Schauder from as far as the United States to discuss aspects of counselling. The Hans Schauder Institute was founded in Germany in the late Eighties.

There followed a steady stream of visitors from Europe: people who wished to discuss their problems with Schauder or seek advice on spiritual and moral questions, or who simply valued the opportunity to have contact with a very cultured and wise human being. Schauder would repeatedly warn people to foster their inner being through prayer and meditation and develop their inner life to meet the dangers of involvement in our modern hectic lifestyle.

Hans Schauder was a pioneer of the therapy that comes about through a pure meeting of human beings, a completely upright, authentic meeting both in his private life and in his profession. For him the word Empathy was a reality that he lived to the full extent. The growing interest in biography work in Germany and elsewhere that led to the founding of the Hans Schauder Institute in Karlsruhe has also led to a number of anthroposophically-oriented institutions and practitioners orienting their biography work b on his insights.

Two books of his poems were published in German. The second was published posthumously and addressed themes of aging, illness, and death. In his professional work, Schauder assisted patients during personal crises.

== Published work ==
- Lebensberatung by Hans Schauder and Marcus Lefébure Verlag am Goetheanum (January 1, 1987) ISBN 978-3723504284
- Conversations on Counselling: Between a Doctor and a Priest with Marcus Lefébure Bloomsbury T&T Clark; 3 edition (November 14, 2000) ISBN 978-0567291646
- Wege zu hellen Wassern: Gedichte Stuttgart : Urachhaus, 1984 ISBN 9783878384038
- Hans Schauder Vienna – My Home. Recollections, Collected and Recorded by Horst Werner Franke Edinburgh Agathe Dawson 2001 with illustrations. Transl. Christian von Arnim
- Reine Flamme, aus dem Dunkel steigend. Gedichte edited by Susanne Kerkovius, 1993
