= Arick Wierson =

American television executive and columnist (born 1971)

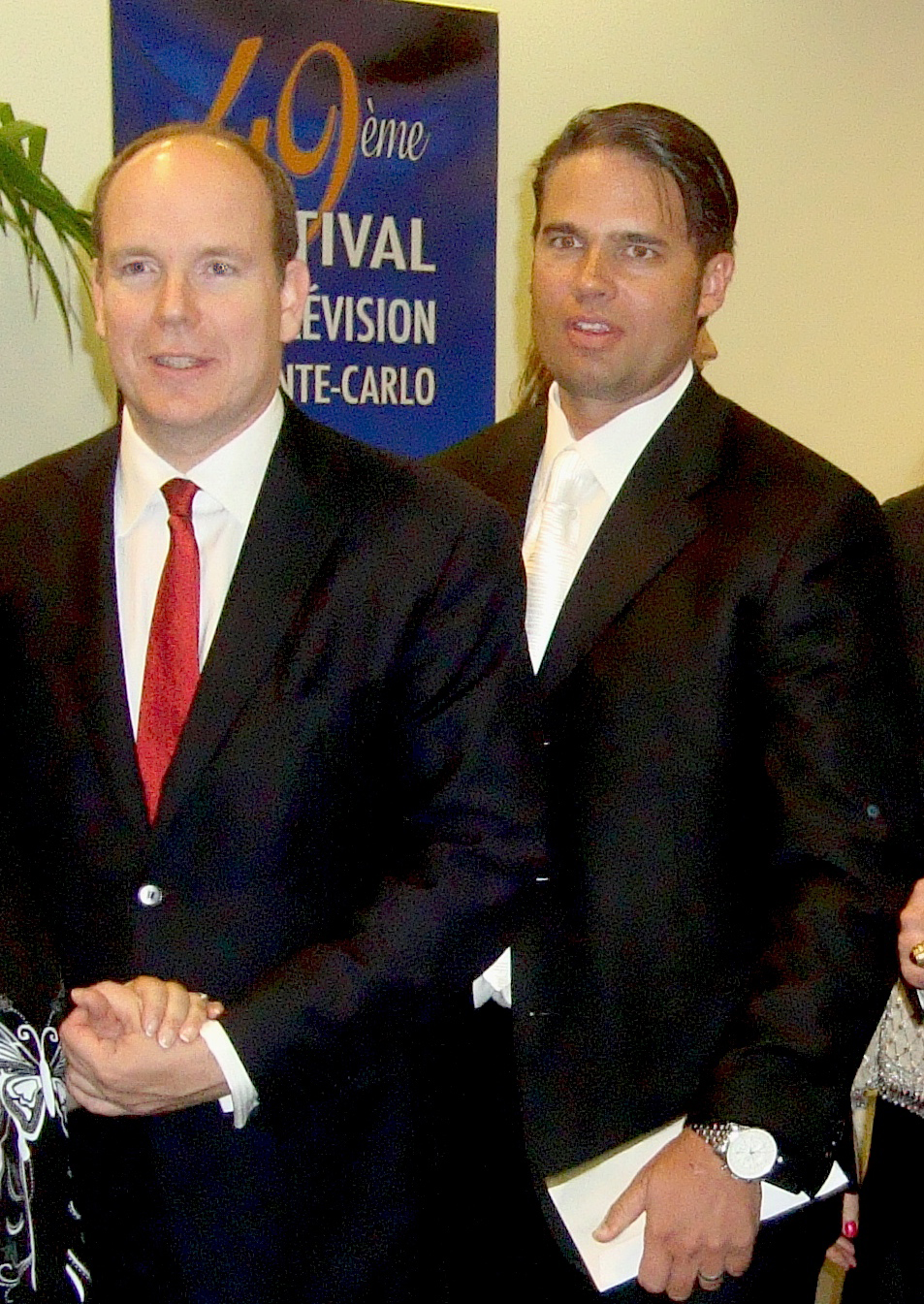
- Arick Wierson (right) alongside Albert II, Prince of Monaco (left) at the 2009 Monte-Carlo Television Festival
- Born: Arick Brice Wierson; November 23, 1971 (age 54); Minneapolis, Minnesota, U.S.
- Occupations: Media personality; columnist; political consultant; businessman
- Years active: 2001–present
- Known for: CNN; Mayoralty of Michael Bloomberg
- Spouses: Fabiana Calhau Mesquita (m. 2000; div. 2012) Hermenegilda Marcelina Vianeke (m. 2016)
- Children: 3
- Parents: Wallace Edward Wierson (father); Coletta Mae Hahn Wierson (mother)
- Relatives: Eric Sevareid
- Website: arickwierson.com

Arick Wierson (born November 23, 1971) is an American columnist who writes on politics and business for CNN and Newsweek. He is also a regular contributor to several other major US publications including Vice, The New York Observer, Worth, The New York Daily News, and CNBC and is a regular on-air political and social commentator for SBT (Sistema Brasileiro de Televisão), the second-most watched television network in Brazil. He is a six-time Emmy Award-winning television producer. In 2010, Wierson won an Emmy award for the documentary film Back Door Channels: The Price of Peace featuring former U.S. President Jimmy Carter and his work to bring peace between Israel and Egypt. Wierson first appeared on the national stage as a senior political advisor to former New York City Mayor Michael Bloomberg. Wierson has been described as "one of the most important people in New York media."

Along with co-founder Seth Unger, Wierson was responsible for the creation and launch of NYC TV (now known as NYC Media).

Wierson has also been credited as a major force behind the creation of the first private television station in Angola, TV Zimbo, and the establishment of Luanda Fashion Center, the largest department store in Angola.

In the United States, Wierson played a key role in the launch of the annual Manova Summit, a large annual event on the global health calendar that brings together leaders from healthcare and retail,

It has been reported that Wierson played a key behind-the-scenes role as a media advisor to the 2018 campaign of Brazilian presidential candidate Jair Bolsonaro, softening the candidate's message to broaden his appeal in the run-off election. with the campaign's strategic messaging and television advertising. In 2020, Washington Compol named Wierson as one of world's 100 most influential political marketers for his work on the Bolsonaro election. Wierson has since broken ties with Bolsonaro, who he has criticized in the Brazilian media for his handling of the government's poor response to the COVID-19 pandemic.

== Early years ==
Wierson grew up in Excelsior, Minnesota and attended part of his high school years overseas, attending the Alexander Muss High School in Israel. He graduated from Minnetonka High School (1990), later graduating cum laude from Georgetown University (1994) with a Bachelor's of Science degree in Foreign Service. In 1997, Wierson, was named the Rotary International Ambassadorial Scholar representing the State of Minnesota, which he used to receive his master's degree in economics from the State University of Campinas (UNICAMP). Wierson's career began as an investment banker, working for the World Bank, ABN AMRO Bank, and JP Morgan. While pursuing his master's degree in Brazil, Wierson also became a recognizable celebrity in the country for his work as a fashion model and television actor. From 1995 through 1997, Wierson appeared in multiple television commercials and print advertisements for brands such as Chevrolet, Gatorade, and Colgate (toothpaste) among many others. He was the "Colírio" (Hunk of the Month) for the July, 1995 issue of Brazil's Capricho (magazine), the same issue that marked first-ever magazine cover featuring Gisele Bündchen.

== Political campaigns ==
In 2001, billionaire businessman Michael Bloomberg recruited Wierson to aid him in his first bid to become the 108th Mayor of New York City. During the campaign, Wierson oversaw field operations which combined traditional electioneering and voter profiling databases, which political analysts point to as the campaign that ushered in a new era of technically sophisticated, statistical, voter profiling for political operations in the country.

Wierson is known to be close to maverick political strategist Bill Hillsman, who has asked Wierson to lecture in his courses at the John F. Kennedy School of Government at Harvard University on several occasions. In June 2010, Brazilian vice presidential candidate and Federal Deputy Antônio Pedro de Siqueira Indio da Costa (Democrats) invited Wierson to advise him and presidential candidate José Serra on media and political matters during the final months of the campaign before the October election. Wierson is said to have declined the invitation due to "ongoing engagements in Angola."

In 2018, Wierson's name surfaced again in the Brazilian media as being in talks with several presidential candidates. Although it was initially widely reported in major Brazilian news outlets that a marketing and political consulting firm closely associated with Arick Wierson had been working to elect Brazilian businessman-turned candidate presidential candidate João Dionisio Amoêdo and the New Party (Brazil), multiple reports later indicated that Wierson was in fact advising the campaign of presidential candidate Jair Bolsonaro who was elected President of Brazil in October 2018. Wierson advised the Bolsonaro campaign on its strategic messaging and television advertising. Analysts covering the race in Brazil credit Wierson with "softening" Bolsonaro's image and encouraging him to not attend the final debates. It is suggested that Wierson impacted the outcome of the race by repositioning Bolsonaro as more moderate and inclusive in an effort to lower the candidate's negatives.

== Media and television ==
During his tenure at NYC Media working under New York City Mayor Michael R. Bloomberg, Wierson led the flagship NYC TV station to 160 Emmy nominations, while personally being nominated on 29 different occasions for the role of Executive Producer in the creation of various programs. To date he has won five Emmy awards for his role as the Executive Producer of the nationally syndicated Secrets of New York as well one Emmy for his role as Executive Producer of the feature documentary film "Back Door Channels: The Price of Peace" which featured former U.S. President Jimmy Carter, former Secretary-General of the U.N. Boutros Boutros-Ghali, Dr. Henry Kissinger, the former U.S. Secretary of State and CNN's Wolf Blitzer, among other notables. The film deals with the 1979 Peace Treaty between Israel and Egypt and the unlikely circumstances and behind-the scenes jockeying that led to its coming to fruition.

In 2009, New York City Mayor Michael Bloomberg announced that Wierson was returning to the private sector.

Broadcasting & Cable Magazine described Wierson as "one of the most important people in New York media". Under Wierson, NYC TV expanded from a local cable operation to a broad array of broadcast, cable, production, online video and syndication entities, organized under the name of NYC Media. At his time at NYC TV, Wierson led the network to 42 NY Emmy Awards and over 100 National Telly Cable Awards. In addition to Secrets of New York, Wierson played a role in the creation of many of the network's original series' productions including $9.99, Eat Out NY, New York 360*, and The Bridge. In 2008, Wierson led NYC TV's digital media group to its first-ever Webby nominations.

At NYC Media Group (since rebranded as NYC Media), Wierson was vocal critic of traditional public broadcasting for second-tier stations in heavily saturated markets like New York City. In 2005, Wierson disbanded the station's long-held PBS status, enabling NYC TV's original shows to take over prime-time "It was smart not to be the 'fifth channel,' said Dalton Delan, executive vice president of WETA in Washington and producer of the PBS News Hour. You don't want to be the triple-A team. You want to find a new ballpark where you can be No. 1." In August 2006, Wierson, Unger and Bloomberg appeared in the NBC studios, joined WNBC General Manager Francis X. Comerford and former NBC Station Group President Jay Ireland in announcing a partnership between NYC TV and NBC flagship station WNBC Mayor Michael Bloomberg, who began Bloomberg Television as part of his media empire, knew better than most the value of a city television station, his aides said."

In addition to the TV business, Wierson is also credited with leading a complete overhaul of WNYE 91.5 FM, with new formats for morning and afternoon drive-time programming, re-branding itself as "Radio New York" and in partnership with live coast-to-coast music feeds from Seattle-based alternative rock station KEXP. The announcement was seen as an aggressive move by the New York City Indie music community, causing broadcaster WFUV to take public on-air swipes at Wierson for having encroached on their market. On March 5, 2009, Wierson, along with NYC Mayor Michael Bloomberg, announced that WNYE, after being in Brooklyn since 1938, was moving its radio broadcast operations to Manhattan, and was unveiling a new digital transmitter, capable of transmitting multiple in-band HD radio streams.

Over the years that Wierson was at the helm of New York City's media assets, he was known to spar with several public officials who were critical of the Bloomberg Administration. New York City Councilwoman Gale Brewer, who at the time represented Manhattan's Upper West Side on the City Council and had oversight over telecommunications and technology (she is now the Manhattan Borough President), regularly criticized the Bloomberg media and communications operation as being "too flashy" with its focus on fashion, celebrity, and other topics she viewed as inconsistent with the mission of the network. Wierson countered Brewer in sworn Council testimony that "television is meant to be watched."

While at NYC Media, Wierson also taught as an adjunct professor of business at the MBA program at Metropolitan College of New York (formerly known as Audrey Cohen College) lecturing on the business of media and television.

In 2009, Mayor Bloomberg announced Wierson was stepping down as President of NYC Media Group, saying "Over the past seven years, Arick Wierson and his team transformed NYC TV into one of the nation's best television stations. After helping build the station virtually from scratch, Arick oversaw the merger of NYC TV with WNYE-TV and WNYE (FM), creating the largest local media group in New York that now reaches hundreds of thousands of people every day. NYC TV's 160 New York Emmy nominations and 42 awards serve as a testament to Arick's vision, tenacity, and leadership and to the excellence of the media group he was instrumental in creating. I have no doubt that Arick's entrepreneurial and creative talents, which helped him achieve great things at NYC TV will serve him well as he rejoins the private sector..."

The New York Times later revealed that Wierson had been quietly producing a documentary film starring former U.S. President Jimmy Carter "Back Door Channels: The Price of Peace" which later opened in Monte-Carlo and Abu Dhabi.

== Business activities in Angola ==
In 2009, Wierson was recruited by Brazilian TV juggernaut Globo (conglomerate) and Brazilian-Angolan billionaire Valdomiro Minoru Dondo to serve as the CEO and General Manager of Angola's first private TV station in Angola.

In 2011, it was reported that Wierson was leading an effort to open the first large-scale modern department store in Angola to be called Luanda Fashion Center. Luanda Fashion Center was acquired by the Brazilian retailer, Morena Rosa Group in 2014.

== Manova Global Summit ==
In the spring of 2018, in the wake of a failed attempt to bring the 2023 World's Fair to Minnesota, it was reported that Wierson, former General Mill's Chief Marketing Officer Mark Addicks, and publicist Kathryn Tunheim joined forces with The Medical Alley Association, The Mayo Clinic, and Walmart to launch The Manova Global Summit on the Future of Health.

== Journalism career ==
Wierson began writing for The New York Observer shortly after returning to the United States in 2017, oftentimes sharing his views on recently elected US President Donald Trump and offering insights and comparisons that could be drawn from his time working with his former longtime boss, former New York City Mayor Michael Bloomberg, the wealthiest man to ever hold public elected office in the history of the United States. In 2018, Wierson began writing political columns for CNBC, offering his analysis of the 2018 United States elections, drawing upon his years as political aide to Bloomberg. Later that year he began doing political analysis for Vice as well. It was also in 2018 that Wierson was invited to offer political commentary for CNN both as an on-air analyst as well as for the network's website. Wierson became a regular columnist for CNN in 2019 as speculation began to mount that Bloomberg would be running for president in the 2020 Democratic Party presidential primaries. In a column for the Observer, after Bloomberg famously dismissed speculation he would be running for president in 2020, Wierson famously labeled the New York billionaire as the "Obi-Wan Kenobi of the Democratic Party, more powerful in his political afterlife than he ever was as an elected official or as a potential presidential candidate."—a meme Bloomberg would use as part of his political messaging once he entered and then dropped out of the presidential race after a disastrous showing on Super Tuesday, 2020.

With the Observer moving to decidedly less political coverage by 2018 due to the outlet being owned by Trump son-in-law Jared Kushner, Wierson began to focus his writing on disruption and innovation in business. His annual list of "The Hottest Companies in 'Flyover tech'" has become a staple of the outlet's "Power Lists." In 2019, Wierson began writing for the upscale Worth (magazine) on a range of topics spanning healthcare, innovation, philanthropy, and other topics of interest to the magazine's ultra-high net worth readers, including interviews with famous business leaders. In 2020, Wierson began a monthly column for the Robin Report, a retail industry insiders news service for retail and fashion executives.

In 2023, Wierson began writing a regular column for Newsweek magazine as well conducting on-camera interviews with high profile personalities in international and U.S. politics such as the former President of Colombia, Ivan Duque, President Dr. Mohammed Irfaan Ali of Guyana, and Minnesota Governor and Chair of the Democratic Governors Association, Tim Walz.

Also in 2023, Wierson began offering regular commentary and insights on international, U.S., and Brazilian politics for SBT News which is part of the SBT TV Network, the second largest television network in Brazil, as an on-air contributor. The network's news anchors often rely on Wierson, who speaks fluent Portuguese and lived for many years in Brazil, to interpret U.S. and global events for Brazilian audiences in terms that they will readily understand.

== Personal life ==
From 2000 to 2013 Wierson was married to Fabiana Mesquita-Wierson, a former executive at Bloomberg, LP with whom he has one daughter, Isabella Wierson. He later remarried Hermenegilda Vianeke, a native of Angola in 2016. Together they have two children, Haakon and Gabriella. Wierson has written on his mixed-race children and issues of race and racism in various op-eds.
