= Wolf Blitzer =

American journalist and television news anchor (born 1948)

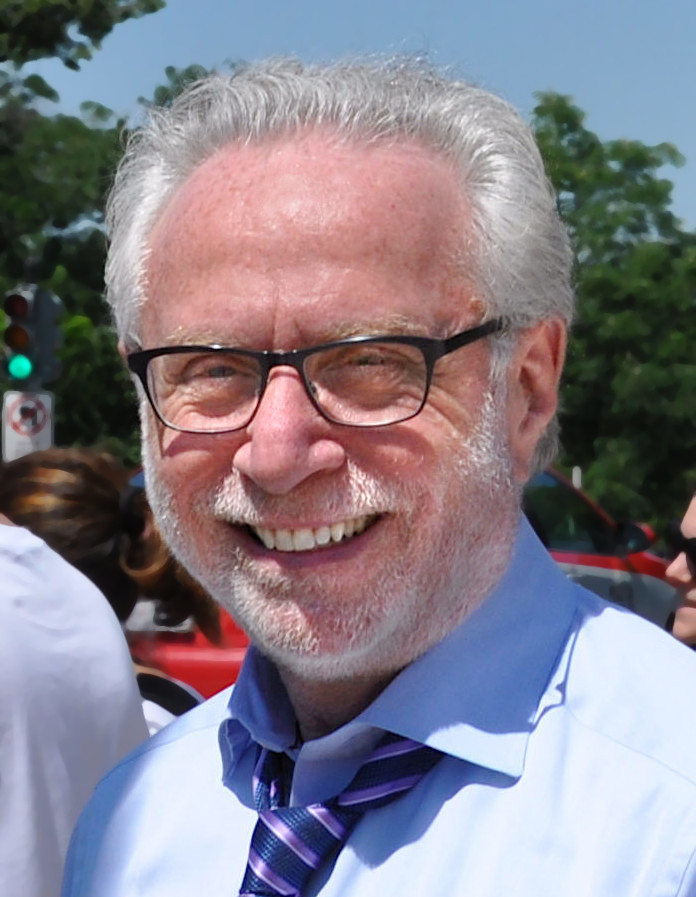
- Blitzer in 2017
- Born: Wolf Isaac Blitzer; March 22, 1948 (age 78); Augsburg, Germany
- Education: University at Buffalo (BA); Johns Hopkins University (MA)
- Occupation: Journalist
- Years active: 1972–present
- Employer: CNN
- Title: Anchor, The Situation Room, CNN Chief Anchor
- Spouse: Lynn Greenfield (m. 1973)
- Children: 1
- Website: www.cnn.com/profiles/wolf-blitzer-profile

Wolf Isaac Blitzer (born March 22, 1948) is an American journalist, television news anchor, and author who has been a CNN reporter since 1990, and who currently serves as one of the principal anchors at the network. He has been a host of The Situation Room, now formally known as The Situation Room with Wolf Blitzer and Pamela Brown, since 2005. Since March 2025, Blitzer co-hosts the show with Pamela Brown; previously he served as the network's lead political anchor until 2021 and as the sole host of The Situation Room with Wolf Blitzer during the show's early evening run between 2005 and 2025.

== Early life and education ==
Blitzer was born in Augsburg, Bavaria, Germany, near Munich in 1948, during the post–World War II Allied occupation the son of Cesia Blitzer (née Zylberfuden), a homemaker, and David Blitzer, a home builder. His parents were Polish Jewish refugees from German-occupied Poland who survived the Nazi concentration camps; his grandparents, two uncles, and two aunts on his father's side were all murdered in Auschwitz. His maternal grandparents were rounded up in Poland and sent to a labor camp to make ammunition for the German war effort, and later died of typhoid fever.

Blitzer and his family immigrated to the United States under the provisions of the 1948 Displaced Persons Act. He was raised in Kenmore, New York, and graduated from Kenmore West Senior High School. He received a Bachelor of Arts in history from the State University of New York at Buffalo in 1970. While there, he was a member of Alpha Epsilon Pi. In 1972, he received a Master of Arts in International Relations from the Johns Hopkins University School of Advanced International Studies (SAIS). While at SAIS, he studied abroad at the Hebrew University of Jerusalem, where he learned Hebrew.

Blitzer has said he has frequently been asked about his name, which has been characterized as seemingly made for TV. He explained that his surname goes back for generations, and that "Wolf" is the same first name as that of his maternal grandfather. His middle name, Isaac, comes from his paternal grandfather.

== Career ==
=== Washington and Jerusalem ===
Blitzer began his career in journalism in the early 1970s, in the Tel Aviv bureau of the Reuters news agency. In 1973, he caught the eye of Jerusalem Post editor Ari Rath, who hired Blitzer as a Washington correspondent for the English-language Israeli newspaper. Blitzer remained with The Jerusalem Post until 1990, covering both American politics and developments in the Middle East.

Fluent in Hebrew, Blitzer also published articles in several Hebrew-language newspapers. Under the name Ze'ev Blitzer, he wrote for Al HaMishmar. Using the name Ze'ev Barak, he had work published in Yedioth Ahronoth. Ze'ev (זאב) is the Hebrew word for "wolf", and Barak (ברק) is the Hebrew word for "lightning" (which in German/Yiddish is Blitz/blits).

In the mid-1970s, Blitzer also worked for the American Israel Public Affairs Committee (AIPAC) as the editor of their monthly publication, the Near East Report. While at AIPAC, Blitzer's writing focused on Middle East affairs as they relate to United States foreign policy.

At an April 1977 White House press conference, Blitzer asked Egyptian President Anwar Sadat why Egyptian scholars, athletes, and journalists were not permitted to visit Israel. Sadat responded that such visits would be possible after an end to the state of belligerence between the two nations. In November of that year, Sadat made a historic visit to Israel, and Blitzer covered the negotiations between the two countries from the first joint Israeli-Egyptian press conference in 1977, to the final negotiations that would lead to the signing of the Egypt–Israel peace treaty two years later.

In 1985, Blitzer published his first book, Between Washington and Jerusalem: A Reporter's Notebook (Oxford University Press, 1985). The book draws on his experience as a journalist and examines relations between the United States and Israel.

=== Jonathan Pollard ===
In 1986, Blitzer became known for his coverage of the arrest and trial of Jonathan Pollard, a US Navy intelligence analyst who was charged with spying for Israel. Blitzer was the first journalist to interview Pollard, publishing the interview as a front-page article in The Jerusalem Post, and he later wrote a book about the Pollard Affair titled Territory of Lies: The Exclusive Story of Jonathan Jay Pollard : The American Who Spied on His Country for Israel and How He Was Betrayed. In the book, Blitzer writes that Pollard contacted him because he had been reading Blitzer's byline for years, and because Blitzer "had apparently impressed him as someone who was sympathetic." Pollard also hoped that Blitzer would help him "reach the people of Israel, as well as the American Jewish community."

Blitzer's interview with Pollard was controversial in the context of the legal action against him, as it was construed by some media voices as a possible violation of the terms of Pollard's plea deal, which forbade media contact. Blitzer's subsequent book about the affair was included in The New York Times list of "Notable Books of the Year" for 1989. In its review, the Times praised the book as "lucid and highly readable" and called Blitzer's judgment of Israeli officials "harsh but fair".

A review by journalist Robert I. Friedman in The New York Review of Books was more critical, prompting a letter from Blitzer accusing him of making several inaccurate statements. Friedman responded to Blitzer's criticism by characterizing Territory of Lies as "a slick piece of damage control that would make [Blitzer's] former employers at AIPAC (not to mention Israel's Defense Ministry) proud."

Pollard was released on November 20, 2015, in accordance with federal guidelines in place at the time of his sentencing.

=== CNN ===
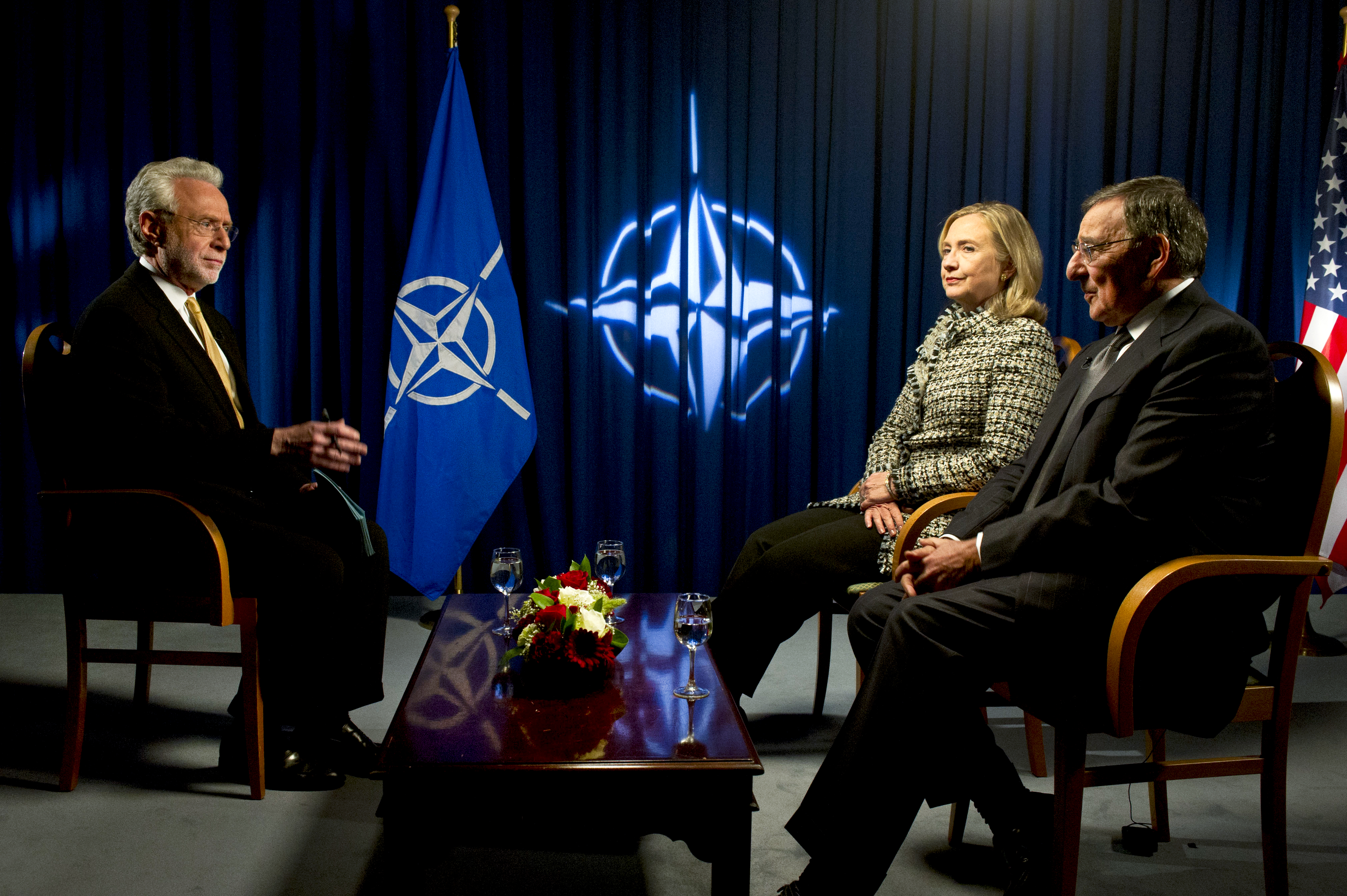
Blitzer interviews U.S. Defense Secretary Leon Panetta and Secretary of State Hillary Clinton at NATO headquarters in Brussels, April 18, 2012

In May 1990, Blitzer moved to CNN and worked as the cable network's military affairs reporter where he covered the first Gulf War in Kuwait.

In 1992, Blitzer became CNN's White House correspondent, a position he would hold until 1999. During that period, he earned an Emmy Award for his coverage of the 1995 Oklahoma City bombing. In 1998, he began hosting the CNN Sunday morning interview program Late Edition with Wolf Blitzer, which was seen in over 180 countries. Blitzer's first assignment as an anchor was on the daily newscast The World Today, in 1999. In 2000, he started anchoring his own show, Wolf Blitzer Reports, which ran until 2005.

CNN selected Blitzer to anchor their coverage of all U.S. presidential elections since 2004. Since August 8, 2005, Blitzer has hosted The Situation Room, a two-hour afternoon/early evening program on CNN.

In 2013, he began anchoring the 1pm ET hour of CNN Newsroom; in 2014, the program was renamed Wolf. Wolf ended in 2018 and was replaced by CNN Right Now, hosted by Brianna Keilar.

In January 2021, CNN announced programming changes, shortening The Situation Room to one hour (6–7 p.m. (ET)) beginning April 26, and expanding Jake Tapper's role at the network to become Lead Washington anchor and expanded his show The Lead with Jake Tapper to 4–6 p.m. (ET). Blitzer will remain hosting documentaries and serving "as principal anchor for all major breaking news." However, Jim Acosta is now regarded as the network's "chief domestic correspondent".

In 2022, he hosted The Newscast with Wolf Blitzer on CNN's short-lived streaming service, CNN+ from its late March launch to its late April end.

In January 2025, it was announced that The Situation Room would move from its afternoon time slot and air in the mornings from 10 a.m. to noon EST in March 2025, with Pamela Brown also serving as Blitzer's co-anchor when the time slot switch takes. The changes to the Situation Room would officially go into effect in March.

On April 25, 2026, Blitzer was present during the White House Correspondents' Dinner shooting at the Washington Hilton hotel in Washington, D.C. He said that he was near the suspect and heard several gunshots. Cops got on top of Blitzer for protection and took him to a secure room. He called it "a frightening experience", but said that he was "fine". Immediately after, Blitzer reported live on CNN about what happened.

== Awards ==
Blitzer has won multiple awards, including the 2004 Journalist Pillar of Justice Award from the Respect for Law Alliance, and the 2003 Daniel Pearl Award from the Chicago Press Veterans Association. His news team was among those awarded a George Foster Peabody Award for coverage of Hurricane Katrina, an Alfred I. DuPont Award for coverage of the 1999 Southeast Asian tsunami, and an Edward R. Murrow Award for CNN's coverage of the terrorist attacks on September 11, 2001.

In November 2002, he won the American Veteran Awards' Ernie Pyle Journalism Award for military reporting. In February 2000, he received the Anti-Defamation League's Hubert H. Humphrey First Amendment Freedoms Prize. In 1999, Blitzer won the International Platform Association's Lowell Thomas Broadcast Journalism Award. Blitzer won an Emmy Award for his coverage of the Oklahoma City bombing. Blitzer was also part of the CNN team that was awarded a Golden ACE award for their 1991 Gulf War reporting. In 1994, American Journalism Review cited him and CNN as the readers' choice for the Best in the Business Award for network coverage of the Clinton administration.

In May 1999, Blitzer was awarded the honorary Doctorate in Humane Letters by the University at Buffalo. On May 20, 2007, he was awarded the honorary Doctorate of Humane Letters by the George Washington University at their undergraduate commencement exercise. On May 23, 2010, Blitzer was awarded the honorary Doctorate of Humane Letters by Niagara University at their undergraduate commencement exercise. Also, on May 14, 2011, he received an honorary Doctorate of Humane Letters from Penn State University. On September 25, 2011, Blitzer was awarded an honorary Doctorate of Humane Letters by the University of Hartford. On May 10, 2014, Blitzer received an honorary Doctorate of Humane Letters from Howard University. On September 13, 2014, Blitzer received the Golden Plate Award of the American Academy of Achievement presented by Awards Council member Rick Atkinson. On May 16, 2024, Blitzer received an honorary Doctorate of Humane Letters from The Jewish Theological Seminary. On June 26, 2024, he received the Augsburg Media Prize for Lifetime Achievement in the Goldener Saal of the town hall of his birthtown, Augsburg. In August 2024, it was announced that Blitzer would be the 2024 recipient of the Walter Cronkite Award for Excellence in Journalism.

== Other media appearances ==
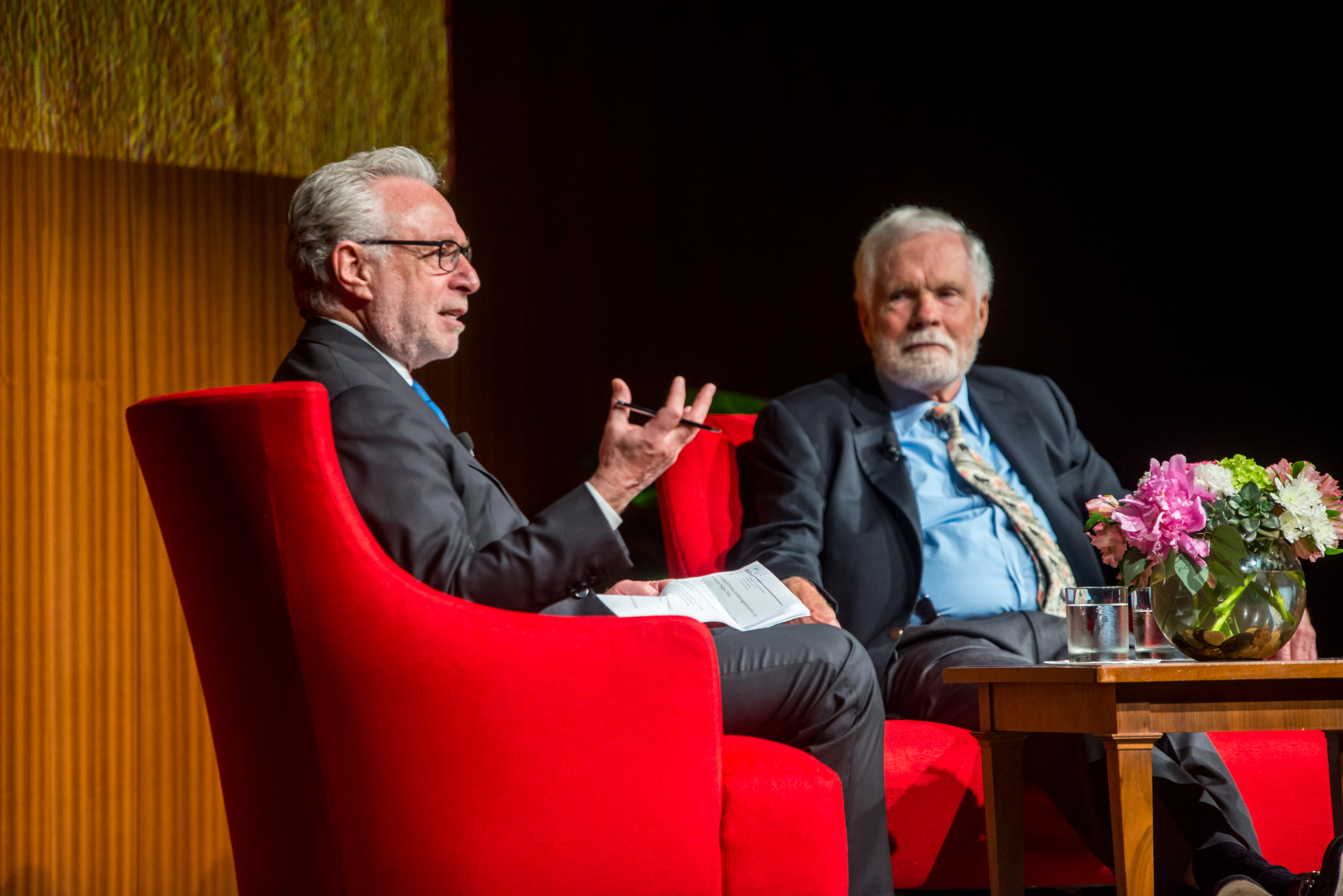
Blitzer and Ted Turner at the LBJ Auditorium in Austin, Texas

On September 17, 2009, Blitzer competed on an episode of Celebrity Jeopardy!, finishing the Double Jeopardy round with negative $4,600. Blitzer was given $1,000 to bet in Final Jeopardy!, finishing with $2,000, losing to comedian Andy Richter.

Blitzer, along with fellow CNN anchor John King, is a fan of the Washington Wizards and participates in a pre-game video update for the team at home games known as the "Wizards Situation."

Blitzer has appeared in numerous films as himself, reporting on events, including the James Bond film Skyfall. Blitzer also made guest appearances in Netflix's political drama House of Cards, portraying himself. He also makes a brief cameo in the 2016 film Batman v Superman: Dawn of Justice and in the Ben 10: Omniverse episode "An American Benwolf in London". He appears as himself in Mission: Impossible - Fallout (2018).

Blitzer played a supporting role in the 2009 documentary Back Door Channels: The Price of Peace, which traces the confluence of factors that made the 1979 Egypt–Israel peace treaty possible. In the film, he discusses his experience as a journalist working for The Jerusalem Post at the time the treaty was negotiated.

== Personal life ==
Blitzer is a fan of his hometown NFL team, the Buffalo Bills.

== Books ==
- Blitzer, Wolf (January 1, 1989). Territory of Lies: The Exclusive Story of Jonathan Jay Pollard, the American Who Spied on His Country for Israel and How He Was Betrayed. New York: Harper & Row. ISBN 0060159723. OCLC 18835427.

Media offices
Preceded by Charles Bierbauer	CNN Senior White House Correspondent; 1993–1999	Succeeded by John King
