= Alexandros discography =

Discography of Japanese rock band Alexandros

[Alexandros] discography
- Studio albums: 9
- Demo albums: 7
- Live albums: 1
- Compilation albums: 1
- Singles: 23
- Video albums: 12
- Music videos: 65
- Concept albums: 1
- Digital singles: 31
- Box sets: 2

The discography of the Japanese rock band [Alexandros] consists of nine studio albums, one live album, one compilation album, one concept album, seven demo albums, 23 CD singles, 31 digital singles, two box sets, 12 video albums and 65 music videos. It includes releases issued under the band's former name, [Champagne], and releases using the former stylization of [ALEXANDROS].

The band made their official debut in January 2010 with the album Where's My Potato?, released through RX-Records. After releasing three further studio albums independently, the band changed their name from [Champagne] to [Alexandros] in March 2014 and signed a partnership agreement with Universal Music Group later that year. Their first major-label debut single, "Wataridori" / "Dracula La", was released in March 2015, followed by the studio album ALXD in June.

The band's sixth studio album, Exist!, became their first album to top both the Oricon Albums Chart and the Billboard Japan Hot Albums chart. Subsequent releases include Sleepless in Brooklyn in 2018, the concept album Bedroom Joule in 2020, the compilation album Where's My History? in 2021, But wait. Cats? in 2022 and Provoke in 2025.

== Albums ==
=== Studio albums ===
List of studio albums, with selected chart positions and certifications
Title	Album details	Peak chart positions			Certifications
Title	Album details	JPN	JPN Hot	TWN East Asia	Certifications
Where's My Potato? (as [Champagne])	Released: January 20, 2010; Label: RX-Records; Formats: CD, digital download	119	—	—	
I Wanna Go to Hawaii. (as [Champagne])	Released: February 9, 2011; Label: RX-Records; Formats: CD, digital download	14	—	—	
Schwarzenegger (as [Champagne])	Released: April 4, 2012; Label: RX-Records; Formats: CD, digital download	10	—	—	
Me No Do Karate. (as [Champagne])	Released: June 26, 2013; Label: RX-Records; Formats: CD, digital download	13	—	—	
ALXD	Released: June 17, 2015; Label: Universal J, RX-Records; Formats: CD, LP, digital download	3	2	—	JPN: Gold
Exist!	Released: November 9, 2016; Label: Universal J, RX-Records; Formats: CD, LP, digital download	1	1	—	JPN: Gold
Sleepless in Brooklyn (as [ALEXANDROS])	Released: November 21, 2018; Label: Universal J, RX-Records; Formats: CD, LP, digital download	3	3	1	JPN: Gold
But wait. Cats?	Released: July 13, 2022; Label: Universal J, RX-Records; Formats: CD, LP, digital download	4	4	—	
Provoke	Released: April 23, 2025; Label: Universal Music Japan, RX-Records, Polydor Records; Formats: CD, LP, digital download	11	61	—	
"—" denotes items which were not released in that country or failed to chart.

=== Live albums ===
Title	Album details	Peak chart positions	
Title	Album details	JPN	JPN Hot
This Summer Festival 2022 (Live at Tokyo International Forum Hall A 2022.4.28)	Released: August 26, 2022; Label: Universal J, RX-Records; Format: Digital download	34	—
"—" denotes items which were not released in that country or failed to chart.

=== Compilation albums ===
Title	Album details	Peak chart positions	
Title	Album details	JPN	JPN Hot
Where's My History?	Released: March 17, 2021; Label: Universal J, RX-Records; Formats: CD, LP, digital download	2	2
"—" denotes items which were not released in that country or failed to chart.

=== Concept albums ===
Title	Album details	Peak chart positions	
Title	Album details	JPN	JPN Hot
Bedroom Joule	Released: June 21, 2020 (Digital); August 26, 2020 (CD); Label: Universal J, RX-Records; Formats: CD, digital download	8	8
"—" denotes items which were not released in that country or failed to chart.

=== Video albums ===
No.	Title	Peak chart position
No.	Title	JPN
1st	It's Me and Me Against the World (as [Champagne]): Release date: October 5, 2011; Format: DVD	—
2nd	I Thought It Was Only One Day (as [Champagne]): Released: October 17, 2012; Format: DVD	8
3rd	Live at Budokan 2014: Released: June 18, 2014; Formats: DVD, Blu-ray	10
4th	Space Shower TV presents Welcome! [Alexandros]: Released: December 24, 2014; Formats: DVD, Blu-ray	—
5th	[Alexandros] Live at Makuhari Messe "Taihen Oishu Gozaimasita": Released: March 30, 2016; Formats: DVD, Blu-ray	8
6th	We Come in Peace Tour & Documentary: Released: July 26, 2017; Formats: DVD, Blu-ray	10
7th	Clips: Released: December 20, 2017; Formats: DVD, Blu-ray	12
8th	Premium V.I.P. PARTY 2017.7.2 Nagoya Nippon Gaishi Hall: Released: August 16, 2018; Formats: DVD, Blu-ray	—
9th	Sleepless in Japan Tour -Final-: Released: April 1, 2020; Formats: DVD, Blu-ray	1
10th	"Where's My Yoyogi?" at Makuhari & Documentary: Released: July 28, 2021; Formats: DVD, Blu-ray	4
11th	But wait. Arena? 2022 Tour -Final-: Released: June 7, 2023; Formats: DVD, Blu-ray	1
12th	[Alexandros] 15th Anniversary VIP PARTY '25: Released: September 2, 2026; Formats: DVD, Blu-ray	6
"—" denotes items which were not released in that country or failed to chart.

=== Demo albums ===
The albums listed below were distributed and sold by the band before the release of Where's My Potato?.
Title	Year	Tracklist	Notes
Uee (上へ, Upward)	2004	1. "Kan 7 (環7) " 2. "Uee (上へ) " 3. "Crystal (クリスタル, kurisutaru) " 4. "Stand up" 5. "river" 6. "Forever Young"	
exist	2005	1. "Sky, High, Bright, Light"; 2. "Shake Shake Shake"; 3. "Mayonaka (真夜中, Midnight)"; 4. "Tsunagitomete (つなぎとめて)"; 5. "Coming Summer"	The fourth song, "Tsunagitomete", is the original version of "Kill Me If You Can".
Provocation To Noble Artists	2009	1. "She's Very"; 2. "For Freedom"; 3. "Untitled"; 4. "I Don't Know (Who You Are)"; 5. "Da La La La"; 6. "de Mexico!"; 7. "Kaerimichi (かえりみち)"	All seven songs from this album were remade and included on Where's My Potato?.

== Singles ==
=== CD singles ===
List of singles released on CD, with selected chart positions and certifications, showing year released and album name
Title	Year	Peak chart positions	Certifications	Album
Title	Year	JPN	Certifications	Album
"City" (as [Champagne])	2010	53		I Wanna Go to Hawaii.
"You're So Sweet & I Love You" (as [Champagne])	2010	76		I Wanna Go to Hawaii.
"Ie (言え, Say It)" (as [Champagne])	2011	35		Schwarzenegger
"Spy" (as [Champagne])	2011	50		Schwarzenegger
"Kill Me If You Can" (as [Champagne])	2012	24		Schwarzenegger
"starrrrrrr" / "Namidaga Koboresou (涙がこぼれそう, Tears' Dropping)" (as [Champagne])	2013	13		Me No Do Karate.
"Forever Young" (as [Champagne])	2013	11		Me No Do Karate.
"Run Away" / "Oblivion" (as [Champagne])	2013	9		ALXD
"Adventure / Droshky!"	2014	10		ALXD
"Wataridori (ワタリドリ, Migratory Bird)" / "Dracula La"	2015	5	JPN: 3× Platinum	ALXD
"Girl A"	2015	3	JPN: Gold	Exist!
"New Wall" / "I Want U to Love Me"	2016	7		Exist!
"Swan"	2016	5		Exist!
"Snow Sound" / "Imamade Kimiganaitabun Torimodosou (今まで君が泣いた分取り戻そう, Take Back Now What You've Shed Tears For)"	2017	8		Sleepless in Brooklyn / Exist!
"Ashita, Mata (明日、また, See You Tomorrow)"	2017	4		Sleepless In Brooklyn
"KABUTO" (as [ALEXANDROS])	2018	8		Sleepless In Brooklyn
"Mosquito Bite" (as [ALEXANDROS])	2018	7		Sleepless In Brooklyn
"Beast"	2020	6		—
"Senkou (閃光, Flash)"	2021	5	JPN: Platinum	But Wait. Cats?
"Rock The World" / "Hibi, Oriori (日々、織々)"	2022	3		But Wait. Cats?
"SINGLE 1"	2024	7		Provoke
"SINGLE 2"	2024	7		Provoke
"SINGLE 3"	2025	20		Provoke
"—" denotes items which were not released in that country or failed to chart.

=== Digital singles ===
List of singles released digitally, with selected chart positions and certifications, showing year released and album name
Title	Year	Peak chart positions	Certifications	Album
Title	Year	JPN	Certifications	Album
"Rocknrolla!" (as [Champagne])	2011	—		I Wanna Go to Hawaii.
"Dracula La"	2015	—		ALXD
"Famous Day"	2015	—		ALXD
"Girl A"	2015	3		Exist!
"I Want U to Love Me"	2016	—		Exist!
"Nawe, Nawe"	2016	—		Exist!
"Feel Like"	2016	—		Exist!
"Snow Sound"	2017	—		Sleepless in Brooklyn
"Hanauta (ハナウタ)" (feat. Tahi Saihate) (as [ALEXANDROS])	2018	14		Sleepless in Brooklyn
"Pray" (as [ALEXANDROS])	2019	4		—
"Tsukiiro Horizon (月色ホライズン, Moonlight Horizon)" (as [ALEXANDROS])	2019	6		Where's My History?
"Tsukiiro Horizon (月色ホライズン, Moonlight Horizon) [Chill Out Version]" (as [ALEXANDROS])	2019	—		—
"Amarinimo Suteki Na Yoru Dakara (あまりにも素敵な夜だから, Because it's Such A Wonderful Night)" (as [ALEXANDROS])	2019	9		Where's My History?
"Philosophy (18 Festival Mix)"	2020	12		Where's My History?
"Run Away (Bedroom Version)"	2020	—		Bedroom Joule
"Starrrrrrr (Bedroom Version)"	2020	—		Bedroom Joule
"Kaze ni Natte (風になって, Become The Wind) [1 Half Version]"	2021	10		Where's My History?
"Senkou (閃光, Flash) [Deluxe Edition]"	2021	—		—
"Mushin Pakusu (無心拍数, No Heart Rate)"	2022	13		But Wait. Cats?
"Baby's Alright"	2022	38		But Wait. Cats?
"Senkou (閃光, Flash) [Live at Yoyotai]"	2023	—		—
"Senkou (閃光, Flash) [TeddyLoid Remix]"	2023	—		—
"VANILLA SKY (feat. WurtS)"	2023	38		Provoke
"todayyyyy"	2023	22		Provoke
"Boy Fearless"	2024	—		Provoke
"Kinjito (金字塔)"	2025	42		Provoke
"Koeru (超える, Exceed)"	2025	7		Provoke
"we are still kids & stray cats (:D)"	2025	—		Changed My Mind
"Ash"	2025	—		—
"Hallelujah"	2026	—		—
"ENDROLL (feat. SennaRin, Hiroyuki SAWANO)"	2026	—		—
"—" denotes items which were not released in that country or failed to chart.

=== Demo singles ===
The CDs listed below were distributed and sold by the band before the release of Where's My Potato?.
Title	Year	Tracklist	Notes
Ondosa (温度差, Temperature Difference)	2007	1. "Ondosa (温度差)"; 2. "1,2,3,four" 3. "Spy"	
Demo CD	2007	1. "Mayonaka (drive version)" 2. "Tobu Jikan (飛ぶ時間, Time To Fly)"	The second song, "Tobu Jikan", is the original version of "Oblivion".
You're so sweet (and I love you)	2008	1. "You're so sweet (and I love you)" 2. "Ondosa (premium sample)"	
Untitled	2008	1. "Untitled"; 2. "de Mexico"	

== Box sets ==
Title	Album details	Peak chart positions
Title	Album details	JPN
Sleepless in Brooklyn (Complete Production Limited Edition)	Released: November 21, 2018; Label: Universal J, RX-Records; Formats: CD, DVD	3
Provoke (Complete Production Limited Edition)	Released: April 23, 2025; Label: Universal Music Japan, RX-Records, Polydor Records; Formats: CD, Blu-ray	11
"—" denotes items which were not released in that country or failed to chart.

== Music videos ==
Each music video includes about 30 seconds of bonus footage at the end, with some exceptions.

Title	Year	Director(s)	Album(s)	Ref.
"For Freedom"	2009	Ikki Chida	Provocation To Noble Artists, Where's My Potato?	
"City"	2010	Ikki Chida	I Wanna Go to Hawaii.	
"You're So Sweet & I Love You"	2010	Ikki Chida	I Wanna Go to Hawaii.	
"Rocknrolla!"	2011	Ikki Chida	I Wanna Go to Hawaii.	
"Ie (言え, Say It)"	2011	Ikki Chida	Schwarzenegger	
"Spy"	2011	Ikki Chida	Schwarzenegger	
"Waitress, Waitress!"	2012	Ikki Chida	Schwarzenegger	
"Kids"	2012	Ikki Chida	Schwarzenegger	
"Kill Me If You Can"	2012	Ikki Chida feat. YA	Schwarzenegger	
"starrrrrrr feat. GEROCK"	2012	Tatsuya Murakami	Me No Do Karate.	
"Namidaga Koboresou (涙がこぼれそう, Tears' Dropping)"	2013	Ikki Chida	Me No Do Karate.	
"Forever Young"	2013	Kenta Kimoto	Me No Do Karate.	
"Stimulator"	2013	Hiroyoshi Itagaki	Me No Do Karate.	
"Kick & Spin"	2013	Yoshiharu Seri	Me No Do Karate.	
"Run Away"	2013	Yoshiharu Seri	ALXD	
"Oblivion (feat. LITHIUM HOMME)"	2013	Hiroto Fujiyasu	ALXD	
"Droshky!"	2014	Yoshiharu Seri	ALXD	
"Adventure"	2014	Hidenobu Tanabe	ALXD	
"Wataridori (ワタリドリ, Migratory Bird)"	2015	Hisashi Kikuchi	ALXD	
"Dracula La"	2015	Hisashi Kikuchi	ALXD	
"Famous Day"	2015	Yoshiharu Seri	ALXD	
"Dog 3"	2015	Yoshiharu Seri	ALXD	
"Girl A"	2015	Takuro Okubo	Exist!	
"Boo! (live at Makuhari Messe 2015.12.29)"	2016	Kazuyoshi Iijima	—	
"New Wall"	2016	Masaki Okita	Exist!	
"Swan"	2016	Kouhei Igarashi	Exist!	
"Feel Like"	2016	Misato Kato	Exist!	
"Moon Song (ムーンソング)"	2016	tatsuaki	Exist!	
"Kaiju"	2016	Misato Kato	Exist!	
"Snow Sound"	2017	Misato Kato, Atsunori Toichi	Sleepless in Brooklyn	
"New Wall (Live Makuhari Messe 2017)"	2017	Toru Nomura	—	
"Ashita, Mata (明日、また, See You Tomorrow)"	2017	bait	Sleepless in Brooklyn	
"I Don't Believe In You (Lyric Video)"	2017	Toru Nomura	Sleepless in Brooklyn	
"KABUTO"	2018	Masakazu Fukatsu	Sleepless in Brooklyn	
"Mosquito Bite"	2018	Ryan Valdez	Sleepless in Brooklyn	
"Arpeggio (アルペジオ)"	2018	Takehiro Shiraishi	Sleepless in Brooklyn	
"Pray"	2019	Takuro Okubo	—	
"Tsukiiro Horizon (月色ホライズン, Moonlight Horizon)"	2019	Takuto Shinbo	Where's My History?	
"Amarinimo Suteki Na Yoru Dakara (あまりにも素敵な夜だから, Because it's Such A Wonderful Night)"	2019	Takuto Shinbo	Where's My History?	
"Philosophy"	2020	Hidenobu Tanabe	Where's My History?	
"Beast"	2020	Nasty Men$ah	—	
"Kaze ni Natte (風になって, Become The Wind)"	2021	Futoshi Nakazawa	Where's My History?	
"Senkou (閃光, Flash)"	2021	Ikki Chida	But wait. Cats?	
"Senkou (閃光, Flash) [English Version]"	2021	Shukou Murase	—	
"Senkou (閃光, Flash) [Live]"	2021	—	—	
"Rock The World"	2022	Ikki Chida	But wait. Cats?	
"Hibi, Oriori (日々、織々)"	2022	Denki Imahara	But wait. Cats?	
"Mushin Pakusu (無心拍数, No Heart Rate)"	2022	NNNuventus	But wait. Cats?	
"Baby's Alright"	2022	Denki Imahara	But wait. Cats?	
"Dodemoiikara (どーでもいいから)"	2022	Asuya Hamada	But wait. Cats?	
"crush (クラッシュ)"	2022	Denki Imahara	But wait. Cats?	
"we are still kids & stray cats"	2022	Denki Imahara	But wait. Cats?	
"VANILLA SKY (feat. WurtS)"	2023	WurtS	Provoke	
"todayyyyy"	2023	Kensaku Kakimoto	Provoke	
"Samechau (冷めちゃう, It Will Get Cold)"	2024	Yasuyuki Yamaguchi, Yoohei Kawakami	Provoke	
"Backseat"	2024	Ao Inoue	Provoke	
"Boy Fearless"	2024	YDC	Provoke	
"Mayonaka (Drive Version)"	2024	Yuko Koga	Changed My Mind	
"Kinjito (金字塔)"	2025	motherfucko	Provoke	
"Afterschool"	2025	Yasuyuki Yamaguchi	Provoke	
"Koeru (超える, Exceed)"	2025	YDC	Provoke	
"Coffee Float (feat. hard life)"	2025	YDC	Provoke	
"Ash"	2025	Kazuya Aiura	—	
"Hallelujah"	2026	Hiroshi Maeda	—	
"Endroll (feat. SennaRin, Hiroyuki Sawano)"	2026	Shukou Murase	—	
