= Senkou =

Single by Alexandros

from the album But wait. Cats?
- Language: Japanese, English
- Released: May 5, 2021
- Genre: Alternative rock, J-pop
- Length: 4:26
- Label: Universal J / RX-Records
- Songwriter: Yoohei Kawakami
- Producer: Alexandros

Alexandros singles chronology
"Beast" (2020)	"Senkou" (2021)	"Rock The World" / "Hibi, Oriori" (2022)

"Senkou" (閃光, Senkō; 'Flash') is a song by the Japanese rock band Alexandros. Written and composed by vocalist and guitarist Yoohei Kawakami and produced by Alexandros, it was released as their 19th single on May 5, 2021, through Universal J and RX-Records. The song was used as the theme song for the 2021 animated film Mobile Suit Gundam: Hathaway. It was released digitally on April 28, 2021, ahead of the physical single.

== Background ==
"Senkou" was released approximately six months after Alexandros' previous single, "Beast". It was the band's first release following drummer Satoyasu Shomura's departure because of focal dystonia, and the first following Ib Riad officially joining the band.

"Senkou" was selected as the theme song for the animated film Mobile Suit Gundam Hathaway. The film's producer, Naohiro Ogata, said that the production team wanted an artist capable of expanding the film's reach overseas and chose Alexandros for that reason.

An English version of the song was used as the theme song for the international release of the film on Netflix.

== Release ==
The single was released in four editions: a regular edition, a first-press limited edition available with either a DVD or Blu-ray, and a complete-production limited edition. The latter included an original Gunpla model, the HG 1/144 RX-78-2 Gundam Ver. [Alexandros]. The DVD and Blu-ray editions included six songs recorded at a secret live performance at Shimokitazawa SHELTER, including "Senkou".

On August 6, 2021, a deluxe digital single of "Senkou" was released. It included the original version, the English version, the instrumental version and a live version from Alexandros' 10th-anniversary concert at Makuhari Messe, which was the first time they performed the song to a live audience.

== Commercial performance ==
"Senkou" was released digitally on April 28, 2021, and debuted at number three on the Billboard Japan Download Songs chart, selling 12,518 downloads during its first week. Following the physical single's release, it reached number four on the Billboard Japan Top Single Sales chart and number five on the Download Songs chart, while peaking at number 15 on the Billboard Japan Hot 100. It also reached number four on the Hot Animation chart and number five on the Oricon weekly singles chart.

Following the Japanese theatrical release of Mobile Suit Gundam: Hathaway on June 11, the song rose from number 51 to number nine on the Billboard Japan Download Songs chart before reaching number five the following week. The song surpassed 100 million streams on May 3, 2023, becoming the second Alexandros song to do so.

In May 2024, Yoohei Kawakami received the Bronze Award for "Senkou" at the 2024 JASRAC Awards.

== Music video ==
The music video for "Senkou" was released on April 28, 2021, alongside the song's digital release. It was filmed over three days at Nippon Steel's East Nippon Works Kashima Area in Kashima, Ibaraki, whose industrial facilities and port were used as the video's setting. It was directed by Alexandros' chief manager, Ikki Chida.

The music video for "Senkou (English Version)" was released on June 11, 2021. It uses animation from Mobile Suit Gundam: Hathaway.

== Track listing ==
All tracks are written by Yoohei Kawakami.

CD
No.	Title	Length
1.	"Senkou"	4:26
2.	"Senkou (English Version)"	4:26
3.	"Senkou (Instrumental)"	4:26
Total length:		13:18

DVD/Blu-ray Secret Session Live at Shimokitazawa SHELTER
No.	Title	Length
1.	"Adam's Apple Pie"
2.	"Revolution, My Friend"
3.	"My Blueberry Morning"
4.	"Stimulator"
5.	"Senkou"
6.	"For Freedom"

Digital Deluxe Edition
No.	Title	Length
1.	"Senkou (Live)"	5:10
2.	"Senkou"	4:26
3.	"Senkou (English Version)"	4:26
4.	"Senkou (Instrumental)"	4:26
Total length:		18:26

== Charts ==
=== Weekly charts ===
- Billboard Japan Hot 100 – number 15
- Billboard Japan Download Songs – number 3
- Billboard Japan Streaming Songs – number 87
- Billboard Japan Top Single Sales – number 4
- Billboard Japan Hot Animation – number 4
- Oricon Digital Singles Chart – number 4
- Oricon Singles Chart – number 5
- Oricon Combined Singles Chart – number 11

=== Year-end charts ===
- Billboard Japan Download Songs, 2021 – number 29

== Certifications ==
Region	Certification	Certified units/sales
Japan (RIAJ)	Gold	100,000^{*}
^{*} Sales figures based on certification alone.^{^} Shipments figures based on certification alone.

== Release history ==
Region	Date	Formats	Label	Ref.
Japan	April 28, 2021	Digital download, streaming	Universal J / RX-Records	
Japan	May 5, 2021	CD, DVD/Blu-ray	Universal J / RX-Records	
Worldwide	May 5, 2021	Digital download, streaming	Universal J / RX-Records	
