= Alexandros (band) =

Japanese rock band

[Alexandros] アレキサンドロス
- [Alexandros] in 2025; From left: Ib Riad, Hiroyuki Isobe, Yoohei Kawakami and Masaki Shirai

Background information
- Also known as: [Champagne] (2001–2014); [A]
- Origin: Sagamihara, Kanagawa, Japan
- Genres: Alternative rock; hard rock; experimental rock; pop-punk; indie rock; dream pop
- Works: Discography
- Years active: 2001–present
- Labels: UK Project; RX-Records; Universal Japan; Universal J→Polydor; Wrasse
- Members: Yoohei Kawakami; Hiroyuki Isobe; Masaki Shirai; Ib Riad
- Past members: Hiroki Ishikawa; Hiroshi Nunome; Shuhei Yamaguchi; Kenichiro Mihara; Satoyasu Shomura
- Website: alexandros.jp

Alexandros (Note: Japanese: アレキサンドロス, Hepburn: Arekisandorosu) (stylized as [Alexandros]) are a Japanese rock band formed in 2001 by Yoohei Kawakami. The band consists of Kawakami (lead vocals, rhythm guitar), Hiroyuki Isobe (bass, backing vocals), Masaki Shirai (lead guitar) and Ib Riad (drums). They are managed by UK Project, and are signed to RX-Records and Polydor Records under Universal Music Japan.

Originally known as [Champagne], they made their official debut in 2010 with Where's My Potato? and changed their name to [Alexandros] in 2014 following a request from Bureau du Champagne, Japan.

In November 2014, it was announced that the band had signed a global partnership deal with Universal Music Group, beginning with their 2015 single "Wataridori" / "Dracula La" (ワタリドリ/Dracula La). Subsequent albums and singles have since been released by Universal Music Japan. They have performed internationally, including appearances at The Great Escape Festival in 2013 and the SXSW Music Festival in 2014 and 2016.

Their music has been featured in films, television dramas, anime and video games. "Nawe, Nawe" was used as the theme song for the Japanese version of The Legend of Tarzan, while "New Wall" was the theme for the 2018 mobile game Tales of The Rays. In 2018, "Mosquito Bite" was used as the theme for the film Bleach, and the band also contributed the theme song "Arpeggio" and ending theme "Your Song" to the Sega video game Judgment. A year later in 2019, their song "Pray" was used as the theme for the Japanese dub of the MonsterVerse film Godzilla: King of the Monsters. "Senkou" was used as the theme song for the 2021 film Mobile Suit Gundam: Hathaway, including promotional material and an animated music video released by the band. [Alexandros] songs were also the opening themes for the 2025 anime Sword of the Demon Hunter: Kijin Gentōshō ("Ash") and Umamusume: Cinderella Gray ("Koeru"), and the 2026 anime Fist of the North Star: Hokuto no Ken ("Hallelujah").

Their original name, [Champagne], was borrowed from the Oasis song "Champagne Supernova", although the band later explained it as representing music that could reach and intoxicate everyone. Kawakami had used the name since childhood and had also given it to a band he formed while living in Syria. The name [Alexandros], inspired by Alexander the Great, was picked by Kawakami while the band was in Texas for the SXSW Music Festival in 2014, which was said to reflect the band's global ambitions.

Common nicknames for the band include "Dros" (ドロス, dorosu) and "Areki" (アレキ, areki).

== History ==
=== 2001–2010: Formation and early activity ===
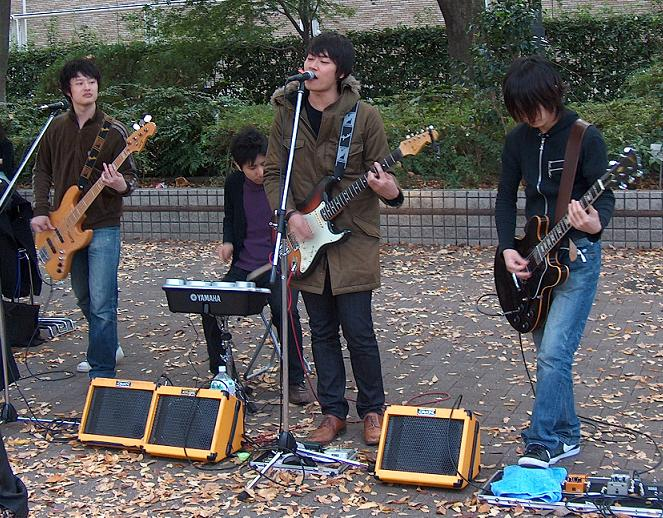
[Alexandros] (as [Champagne]) playing a street show at Yoyogi Park in November 2007

Yoohei Kawakami formed the band [Champagne] in 2001 while attending Aoyama Gakuin University. He initially began musical activities with four fellow students, but they subsequently left after recognizing that Kawakami intended to pursue the band seriously. He then recruited Hiroki Ishikawa, a coworker from his part-time job, as drummer and his university friend Hiroyuki Isobe as bassist. Around 2002, Kawakami and Isobe convinced another student at the university, Hiroshi Nunome, to play lead guitar for the band. Kawakami later recruited his cousin Shuhei Yamaguchi to play rhythm guitar, establishing a five-member lineup. However, in 2004, Yamaguchi left, after which the band performed with support guitarists until Kenichiro Mihara joined as an official member.

During this period, the band independently produced and distributed their earliest recordings. The six-track release Uee (上へ) appeared in 2004, followed by exist in 2005. The latter included early versions of songs that were subsequently reworked or commercially released, including "Shake Shake Shake", "Mayonaka" (真夜中), "Coming Summer" and "Tsunagitomete" (つなぎとめて), which was eventually reworked into "Kill Me If You Can". In 2005, the band also began organizing their own concert series titled "This Summer Festival", shortened to "This Fes" (ディスフェス, disu fesu), which became an annual part of their live activities.

In 2006, following a Valentine's Day concert, Nunome left the band. Kawakami assumed rhythm guitar duties, while Mihara moved to lead guitar. Later that summer, Kawakami recruited Masaki Shirai, a former classmate from Sagamihara-Yaei High School, as a support rhythm guitarist. Shirai had previously played bass in his former band, but transitioned to guitar after joining [Champagne]. In 2007, Shirai was made an official member. Mihara left only a few days later, prompting another reorganization in which Kawakami resumed rhythm guitar and Shirai became the band's lead guitarist.

[Champagne] continued to independently release material throughout the late 2000s, including Ondosa (温度差) and other demo CDs in 2007, Untitled in 2008 and Provocation to Noble Artists in 2009. Many of these songs were later revisited. The 2007 track "Tobu Jikan" (飛ぶ時間) was reworked into "Oblivion", while all seven tracks from Provocation to Noble Artists were remade and included on the band's first studio album.

After signing to the independent label RX-Records under UK Project, the band made their official debut on January 20, 2010 with the release of Where's My Potato?. The album's release was followed by a live house tour and appearances at festivals including Rock in Japan Festival and Summer Sonic. Ishikawa left the band on March 1, 2010 during the album's release tour. Satoyasu Shomura initially joined as a support drummer to complete the tour and later became an official member on April 1.

=== 2010–2013: Independent albums and growing recognition ===
Following the release of Where's My Potato?, [Champagne] issued their first commercially released singles, "City" and "You're So Sweet & I Love You" in July and November 2010 respectively. Their second studio album, I Wanna Go to Hawaii., followed on February 9, 2011. They supported the album's release through an expanded schedule of live house performances and festival appearances, while also releasing the singles "Ie" (言え) and "Spy" later that year.

The band's third studio album, Schwarzenegger, was released on April 4, 2012. It was followed by the single "Kill Me If You Can". Included in this single was "Busy Dragon Playing", which was used as the opening theme for Tokyo FM's Radio Dragon, and a cover of "Accelerator" by Primal Scream. During this period, [Champagne] began appearing as a supporting act for visiting international rock bands, supporting Kasabian in 2012 and Muse and Primal Scream in 2013.

In January 2013, the band released the double-A side single "Starrrrrrr" / "Namidaga Koboresou", followed by "Forever Young" in April. The music video for "Forever Young" attracted controversy because of its close similarities to the video for Australian band Clubfeet's "Everything You Wanted", particularly its use of the members walking through and interacting with freeze-frame images of themselves. Clubfeet and the video's production company, Oh Yeah Wow, publicly accused the "Forever Young" video of copying their work. [Champagne] and UK Project subsequently apologized, removed the video from YouTube and announced that it would no longer be used. Although UK Project initially accepted responsibility for the video's production, the band members acknowledged that they had appeared in and approved the finished video and stated that it deserved the criticism it had received.

Their fourth studio album, Me No Do Karate., was released on June 26. They also expanded their activities outside Asia during this period, playing a show at The Pipeline in London before appearing at The Great Escape Festival in 2013.

Their next single, "Run Away" / "Oblivion", was released on December 25, 2013. It reached number nine on the Oricon Singles Chart, becoming the band's first single to enter the chart's top ten.

=== 2014–2016: Name change and major-label breakthrough ===
On March 12–13, 2014, [Champagne] performed at the SXSW Music Festival in Austin, Texas. Around this period, the band was preparing to change their name after being informed that the term "champagne" was protected as an appellation of origin and that the Japanese branch of the Comité Interprofessionnel du vin de Champagne (CIVC) had requested that they adopt a different name. The band subsequently considered several alternatives. One proposed name was "The Leatherboys", suggested by Primal Scream frontman Bobby Gillespie while drunk after [Champagne] asked him to help choose a new name. The band even produced merchandise bearing the name, but Kawakami later said that he was not satisfied with it.

According to Kawakami, he began looking for another name while in Texas and came across Alexander the Great while searching online. He chose [Alexandros], in part because he liked the appearance and sound of the name. The band announced the change on March 25, 2014, during their annual "Premium V.I.P. Party", which was in that year held at EX Theater Roppongi. Just a few days later, on March 28, they officially introduced the new name during the encore of their first performance at the Nippon Budokan, and all previous works released under [Champagne] were subsequently reissued under [Alexandros].

The band released the double A-side single "Adventure" / "Droshky!" in June 2014. On November 28, they announced a global partnership with Universal Music Group, ending their period as an exclusively independent-label act while maintaining their association with RX-Records and UK Project.

[Alexandros] made their major label debut on March 17, 2015, with the single "Wataridori" / "Dracula La" released through Universal J. "Wataridori" was used as the theme song for the film Akegarasu and later appeared in several advertising campaigns. It became one of the band's most commercially successful songs, eventually receiving a double-platinum digital certification. Its music video surpassed 100 million views on YouTube on August 7, 2019, and the song later exceeded 300 million cumulative streams on Billboard Japan's charts.

Their fifth studio album and first major label album, ALXD, was released on June 17, 2015. In addition to "Wataridori" and "Dracula La", it included previously released songs such as "Adventure" and "Run Away". The album was supported by a national tour and appearances at large music festivals, including Fuji Rock Festival. The band closed the year with the single "Girl A", which was used as the opening theme for the television drama Siren.

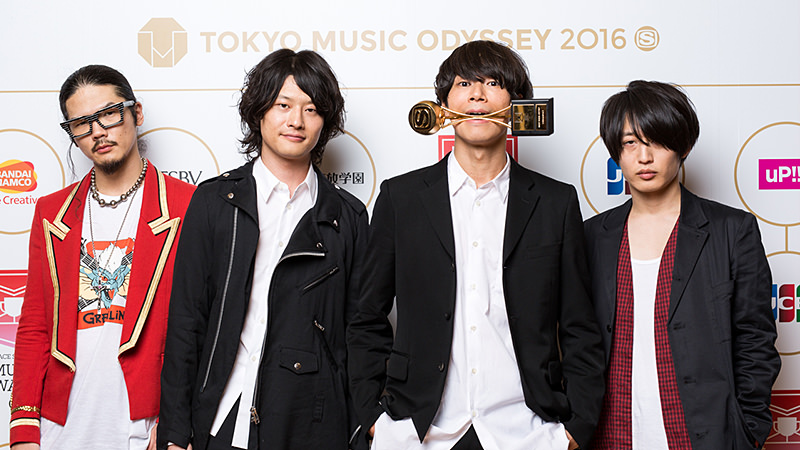
[Alexandros] at Tokyo Music Odyssey 2016, accepting the Best Rock Artist award at the 2016 Space Shower Music Awards

In 2016, they released the singles "New Wall" / "I Want U to Love Me" and "Swan". Both singles were included on their sixth studio album, Exist!, released on November 9. The album incorporated numerous songs written for films, television programs and advertising campaigns. It became the band's first album to reach number one on both the weekly Oricon Albums Chart and the Billboard Japan Hot Albums chart. The release was followed by the "We Come In Peace Tour" in 2016 and 2017, which included international performances in Hong Kong, South Korea and Taiwan.

=== 2017–2019: Arena expansion and Sleepless in Brooklyn ===
In February 2017, [Alexandros] released the double A-side single "Snow Sound" / "Imamade Kimiganaitabun Torimodosou". "Snow Sound" was used in JR East's 2016–2017 JR SkiSki advertising campaign, while the second song served as the theme for the film Closest Love To Heaven, in which Kawakami made a cameo appearance. The single "Ashita, Mata" (明日、また) followed in November.

On March 14, 2018, they announced the release of their 16th single and revealed a change in the stylization of their band name to the all-uppercase [ALEXANDROS]. The title of the single was later revealed as "Kabuto". Kawakami later explained during his regular radio show that the change was made "just on a whim". The single was released on May 23, followed by "Mosquito Bite" in July, which served as the theme song for the live-action film adaptation of Bleach.

That same year, on August 16, they held their first outdoor one-man live concert, "V.I.P. Party 2018", at Zozo Marine Stadium.

The band's seventh studio album, Sleepless in Brooklyn, was released on November 21, 2018. Most of the album was created and produced while the members were staying and recording in Brooklyn, New York, which was reflected in its title. Alongside "Kabuto" and "Mosquito Bite", the album included "Arpeggio", which was used as the theme song for the Sega video game Judge Eyes, released internationally as Judgment. The album retained the band's guitar-led sound while incorporating more layered production and electronic textures than their earlier work. It was supported by their largest tour to that point, combining both live house and arena concerts and concluding with two performances at Saitama Super Arena.

In 2019, [Alexandros] released "Pray", the theme song for the Japanese release of the film Godzilla: King of the Monsters, and "Tsukiiro Horizon" (月色ホライズン). On June 19, 2019, drummer Satoyasu Shomura suspended live performances due to focal dystonia, with Ib Riad of Bigmama stepping in as support drummer.

=== 2020–2021: Pandemic recordings and Shomura's departure ===
On January 1, 2020, the band introduced a new logo and returned the stylization of their name to [Alexandros]. Later that month, the members announced that Shomura would leave the band following the release of their first compilation album, Where's My History?. The album and its associated concerts were initially planned as a celebration of the band's tenth anniversary since their official debut.

However, those plans were disrupted by the COVID-19 pandemic. During its early stages, the members worked remotely on Bedroom Joule, their first concept album. The album was released digitally in June and physically on August 26, 2020. It consisted largely of lo-fi rearrangements of earlier songs and included a new song, "rooftop". The album's production was conducted through online discussions and remote recording, and a part of its proceeds was donated to the Japanese Red Cross Society's response to the pandemic. The band also streamed the audience-free concert "Party in ur Bedroom" on June 20 and 21 on the eplus site.

The pandemic caused Where's My History? and Shomura's planned departure to be postponed, and the two-disc compilation was eventually released on March 17, 2021. Shomura formally left the band later that month during the band's belated tenth anniversary concerts, titled "Where's My Yoyogi?" and performed at Makuhari Messe. The concerts had originally been intended to take place at Yoyogi National Gymnasium, but were cancelled as part of measures intended to prevent the spread of COVID-19.

On April 10, 2021, Ib Riad, who had been supporting the band, officially joined as a full member. The following month, [Alexandros] released "Senkou" (閃光), the theme song for the animated film Mobile Suit Gundam: Hathaway.

=== 2022–2023: But wait. Cats? ===
[Alexandros] released the double A-side single "Rock the World" / "Hibi, Oriori" in February 2022. "Rock the World" was written as the theme song for the animated film Goodbye, Don Glees!, while "Hibi, Oriori" was used in advertising for the Panasonic x Kao Corporation "#Sentaku" project.

Their eighth studio album, But wait. Cats?, was released on July 13, 2022, four years after Sleepless in Brooklyn. The album contained "Senkou" and several other tie-in songs, including "Mushin Pakusu" (無心拍数), the opening theme for the anime adaptation of Ao Ashi, "Baby's Alright", the theme for the television drama Roppongi Class and "crush", the theme for the film adaptation of The Violence Action.

The album's release was supported by the 2022 "But wait. Tour?", the band's first nationwide concert hall tour, followed by the "But wait. Arena?" tour in Tokyo, Nagoya and Osaka. The arena tour concluded with two performances at Yoyogi National Gymnasium.

Following the reorganization of Universal J, [Alexandros]' subsequent releases were issued through RX-Records and Polydor Records under Universal Music Japan.

In 2023, the band collaborated with the musician WurtS on the digital single "Vanilla Sky". A vinyl edition of But wait. Cats? was issued in December of that year.

=== 2024–2025: This Fes, Provoke and fifteenth anniversary ===
In 2024, [Alexandros] returned to Aoyama Gakuin University, where the band was formed, for the "Back to School!!" concert on March 17. The band then released "SINGLE 1" and "SINGLE 2" in 2024, followed by "SINGLE 3" in February 2025.

On October 26 and 27, 2024, [Alexandros] hosted "This Fes '24 in Sagamihara" at Sagamihara Gion Field. The festival was the first edition of the long-running "This Summer Festival" series to be organized and produced entirely by the band, and it formed part of celebrations marking the 70th anniversary of Sagamihara's city status.

The band's ninth studio album, Provoke, was released on April 23, 2025. The album included material from the three preceding singles and was accompanied by Changed My Mind, a collection of rearranged songs, in the limited deluxe edition. Its deluxe release also contained footage from the "Back to School!!" concert and "This Fes '24 in Sagamihara". The album's release was followed by the "Provoke Launch Party", held at Ebisu Garden Hall on April 28. The band subsequently embarked on the 2025 "Provoke Japan Tour", which comprised 24 performances at 18 locations between May and July, including both live house and concert hall dates. An eight-city Asian tour followed between August and September, beginning in Seoul and including performances in Bangkok, Kuala Lumpur, Beijing, Shanghai, Chengdu, Guangzhou and Taipei.

On November 1 and 2, the band hosted "This Fes '25 in Sagamihara" at Sagamihara Gion Field and its surrounding area. They celebrated their fifteenth anniversary with two sold-out concerts titled "[Alexandros] 15th Anniversary V.I.P. Party '25", held at Toyota Arena Tokyo on December 13 and 14. Former drummers Hiroki Ishikawa and Satoyasu Shomura appeared with Ib Riad onstage, with all three performing songs from different periods of the band's discography.

=== 2026–present: Later activities ===
On April 1, 2026, the members were appointed as Honorary Tourism Goodwill Ambassadors for Sagamihara in recognition of their connections to the city and their involvement in local cultural events.

The band released the digital single "Hallelujah" on April 29 as the opening theme for the 2026 anime Fist of the North Star: Hokuto no Ken. On May 29, they released a cover of the SennaRin song "ENDROLL" in which Kawakami had appeared as a guest vocalist. The [Alexandros] version also features SennaRin and Hiroyuki Sawano.

A video album of the band's "15th Anniversary V.I.P. Party '25" concerts was released on September 2, 2026. On October 31–November 1, 2026, [Alexandros] hosted "This Fes '26".

== Artistry ==
=== Musical style ===
[Alexandros] are principally associated with Japan's alternative rock scene. Rooted in guitar rock, their music combines melodic, pop-oriented songwriting with elements of pop rock, indie rock, dance and electronic music, funk, hip-hop and alternative R&B. Yoohei Kawakami is the band's principal songwriter, with his melodies and vocals generally forming the basis of compositions subsequently developed with guitarist Masaki Shirai, bassist Hiroyuki Isobe and the band's drummers. Their arrangements range from direct four-piece rock performances to layered productions incorporating programmed instrumentation, sampling and electronic textures.

Kawakami's musical background draws extensively from British and American rock. Before becoming interested in British music, he was introduced to American rock through his older brother, including Guns N' Roses, and learned guitar in part by playing songs by Nirvana and The Cranberries. Oasis subsequently became a particularly formative influence and the starting point for his interest in British rock; Kawakami has described his listening as extending through Primal Scream, Blur, Radiohead and, in later generations, Arctic Monkeys and The 1975. Kawakami has named (What's the Story) Morning Glory? as his favourite album and said that the band later moved away from an early sound they considered too closely modelled on Oasis.

During their early career as [Champagne], the band combined fast-paced guitar rock with melodic songwriting and frequent use of English-language lyrics. A Skream! review described the 2010 single "City" as pairing a melancholic melody with a driving arrangement and noted its greater use of Japanese compared with much of the band's earlier material. A contemporary live review by Skream! likewise emphasized the speed and energy of their performances and the coordination between Kawakami and Shirai's guitars and the rhythm section of Isobe and Shomura. The band also performed songs by British acts including Oasis and Primal Scream, and recorded a cover of Primal Scream's "Accelerator".

The band's early albums broadened this guitar-led sound. Schwarzenegger was developed through studio sessions and exchanges between the members rather than from fully predetermined arrangements, allowing different rhythms and instrumental approaches to emerge during recording. On Me No Do Karate., they combined accessible melodies with hard rock, punk and funk. During this period, Kawakami also spoke of his desire for the band to move beyond the conventional boundaries of the Japanese rock scene.

Their first major-label album, ALXD, placed greater emphasis on melody and relatively direct arrangements. Kawakami said that they focused on songs, melodies and arrangements rather than adhering to a fixed definition of rock music, while Isobe said that the simpler arrangements made the individual members' playing more apparent. "Wataridori", the album's opener and the band's biggest hit single, features a fast ensemble arrangement and prominent chorus. Their stylistic range expanded further on Exist!, which incorporated indie rock, dance music and hip-hop while retaining Kawakami's melodic songwriting. "Feel Like", an English-language pop song with a comparatively light arrangement, contrasts with the heavier guitar sound associated with much of the band's earlier work.

Sleepless in Brooklyn was largely created while the members were staying and recording in New York. Kawakami said the band sought to reconsider their approach to writing and recording during the album's production. The album made greater use of groove, sampling, programmed instruments and electronic production while retaining rock instrumentation and melodic songwriting. Real Sound and Mikiki identified contemporary pop, alternative R&B, hip-hop and funk among the styles reflected in its production. Kawakami said that attending rock, hip-hop and other performances in New York influenced the band's work during this period. While developing "Mosquito Bite", he said that the combination of its rhythm and guitar sound eventually produced an atmosphere that reminded him of Royal Blood and Queens of the Stone Age. He has also cited The Strokes' "Hard to Explain" as a favourite from his university years and cited the deliberately lo-fi production of Is This It as part of its appeal.

At the same time, recording abroad made Kawakami increasingly conscious of the band's Japanese musical identity. He has cited Quruli, Happy End and Yumi Matsutoya among Japanese artists he admires for combining qualities he regarded as distinctly Japanese with accessible melodies and song structures. Kawakami said that working abroad led him to value characteristics the band had developed within Japanese music rather than removing them in pursuit of a more explicitly Western sound.

Following Shomura's departure and the addition of Ib Riad, But wait. Cats? placed greater emphasis on interaction between the four musicians. Several songs were reshaped through rehearsal and studio experimentation rather than reproducing completed demos directly. This collaborative approach continued on Provoke, for which Kawakami sometimes presented incomplete compositions for Shirai, Isobe and Riad to develop. "WITH ALL DUE RESPECT" revisited the rapid, speech-like vocal delivery heard in some of their earlier material, while its melody developed from Kawakami singing over the band's performance rather than from predetermined guitar chords.

=== Songwriting and recording ===
Kawakami writes most of the band's material and commonly introduces an initial melody, lyric, riff or structural idea before the arrangement is developed collectively. He has described lyrics and melody as closely connected and said that he seeks words whose sound and rhythm fit a song's central melodic phrase. When a chorus contains the principal melodic idea, he may begin the writing process with that section.

The band's lyrics use Japanese, English and combinations of both languages. English was particularly prominent in their early recordings, while "City" represented a more deliberate use of Japanese lyrics. A contemporary review by Skream! noted the careful selection of its Japanese words and interpreted the song as expressing Kawakami's determination to continue pursuing music. Music writers have also discussed the influence of English-language rock on his vocal rhythm and phrasing, particularly where the vocals function rhythmically as well as melodically.

Kawakami's approach to language has developed alongside the band's changing relationship with Western and Japanese music. His early immersion in British and American rock accompanied the extensive use of English in the band's early work, while recording overseas later made him more conscious of Japanese as part of his musical identity. He has said that he does not sharply distinguish between English and Japanese when writing lyrics. His compositions often begin as hummed melodies, with opening words sometimes emerging in English before both languages are retained in the finished lyrics. He has also described words and melody as inseparable, arguing that their combination can convey a song's character even when a listener does not understand the language.

Although Kawakami usually provides the starting composition, the other members may alter its rhythm, structure, dynamics and instrumental parts during rehearsals. He has said that ideas developed in these sessions sometimes went beyond what he had initially imagined. Isobe has also contributed to vocal arrangements and lyric revisions, including during the production of ALXD.

The band continued this collaborative process on their later albums. During the making of But wait. Cats?, the band retained mistakes and unplanned musical phrases when they considered them beneficial to a song. "Aleatoric", the album's opener, developed from an initial riff and general structural outline, with phrases, rhythmic ideas and effects-based guitar sounds introduced by the other members becoming part of the final arrangement.

A similar process was used for Provoke. Although Kawakami planned the album's approximate pacing and sequence relatively early in production, some songs were deliberately left incomplete for the other members to develop. "FABRIC YOUTH" was arranged by Shirai, Isobe and Riad from a basic acoustic guitar and vocal recording while Kawakami worked separately on other material. The members described this process as relying on their familiarity with one another's musical intentions and their willingness to introduce ideas not present in the original demo.

=== Live performances ===
Early concert reviews described [Champagne] as producing speed and energy through the coordination of the four members, with Kawakami and Shirai's guitars supported by the rhythm section of Isobe and Shomura. Their sets included melodic rock, heavier material, dance-oriented rhythms, instrumental passages and audience-participation sections.

Following the band's name change to [Alexandros], reviews continued to emphasize the stylistic range and technical precision of their live performances. At the 2014 Japan Night in TIMM showcase, Barks described the dance-oriented rhythm of "Run Away", jazz-influenced playing in "Waitress, Waitress!", the heavier groove of "Kick & Spin" and audience singalongs during "Starrrrrrr" and "Adventure". John Robb of Louder Than War similarly praised their tightly rehearsed performance, describing their sound as combining pop melodies with elements of emo, metal, punk and goth. He also highlighted their intensity and energy, arguing that their live show could appeal to audiences at major Western rock festivals.

During the COVID-19 pandemic, the band held the livestreamed "Party in ur Bedroom" concert without an in-person audience. The performance used quieter arrangements and reduced instrumentation in contrast with their conventional concerts; Real Sound noted the resulting emphasis on the members' playing and on the rearrangement of the songs.

== Band members ==
=== Principal members ===
==== Current ====
- Yoohei Kawakami (川上 洋平, Kawakami Yōhei; born June 22, 1982) – vocals (2001–present), rhythm guitar (2006, 2007–present), lead guitar (2001)
- Hiroyuki Isobe (磯部 寛之, Isobe Hiroyuki; born December 29, 1982) – bass, backing vocals (2001–present), keyboards (2023–present; studio only)
- Masaki Shirai (白井 眞輝, Shirai Masaki; born December 12, 1982) – lead guitar (2007–present), occasional backing vocals (2007–present), rhythm guitar (2006–2007)
- Ib Riad (リアド 偉武, Riado Ibu; born October 25, 1985) – drums (2021–present)

==== Former ====
- Hiroki Ishikawa (石川 博基, Ishikawa Hiroki; born September 22, 1982) – drums (2001–2010)
  - He was the first member to be recruited to [Champagne] by Kawakami after the first lineup left.
  - He left the band on March 1, 2010.
  - He appeared in early music videos like "For Freedom" and is pictured on the back cover of the first album Where's My Potato?.
- Satoyasu Shomura (庄村 聡泰, Shōmura Satoyasu; born March 21, 1984) – drums (2010–2021)
  - He joined as an official member on April 1, 2010.
  - From June 2019, he went on a hiatus from live performances due to focal dystonia.
  - In January 2020, he announced his retirement with the release of the band's best-of album in May 2020.
  - His last live performance was on March 20–21, 2021, at Makuhari Messe, during the band's 10th anniversary concert.
  - In 2021, he launched a fashion project, Snack NGL, alongside fashion stylists and buyers. He also became a writer for an interview series called "Kiki Mimi" on the Pia website and app.
  - In 2024, he joined Dr. Downer as a member.

=== Early members ===
- Hiroshi Nunome (布目 大, Nunome Hiroshi; born April 2, 1979) – lead guitar (2002−2006)
  - He met Kawakami and Isobe at a university club drinking party and joined after rehearsing with them.
  - He left the band following a Valentine's Day live concert in 2006.
- Shuhei Yamaguchi (山口 修平, Yamaguchi Shūhei; born March 28, 1983) – rhythm guitar (2003–2004)
  - He is Kawakami's cousin and was recruited after the two unexpectedly met at Yamaguchi's workplace.
- Kenichiro Mihara (三原 剣一郎, Mihara Ken'ichirō; born October 18, 1982) – rhythm guitar (2004−2006), lead guitar (2006–2007)
  - He attended the same kindergarten, elementary school and junior high school as Kawakami.
  - He was nicknamed "Mihachin" (みはちん), which became the name he was most commonly known as during his time with [Champagne].

=== Support members ===
- Rosé – keyboard (original group: The Led Snail)
- Mullon – guitar (original group: The Led Snail)

== Appearances ==
=== Television ===
- Welcome! [Alexandros] (Formerly known as: Welcome! [Champagne]) (June 2013 – March 2017, Space Shower TV)
- [Alexandros] 18 Festival: Philosophy of 1000 People (December 21 2019, NHK General TV)

=== Radio ===
- Find Out (April 2013 – March 2014, ZIP-FM) – Hiro only
- SBS PopAsia "The J-Rock Sessions with [Alexandros]" with Yoohei and Hiro (September 2015–September 2016, Australia SBS)
- School of Lock! (October 2015 ~ March 2021, Tokyo FM) – Yoohei as "Kawakami-sensei" on the Tuesday Regular Corner "AlexandLocks!"
- Panasonic presents "Gorilla Radio!" (April 25 2021–present, ZIP-FM) – presented by Hiro

=== Films ===
- Mobile Suit Gundam: Hathaway (June 11, 2021) – Yoohei, Hiro and Shirai as Davao citizens (voice role).

=== Online short films ===
- Even If I Could Find You In My Dreams (夢で会えても, Yume de Aetemo) (December 5, 2020) – Directed by Shunji Iwai as a collaboration with the band.

=== CMs ===
- NTT Docomo student discount campaign – "Ayanosandros?" (2017)
- Tokyo Metro – "Find My Tokyo. 'Asakusa: Fun continues to live'" (2018)
- Panasonic x Kao Corporation – "#Sentaku" (2021)
- Panasonic – "#Sorezore no Sentaku" (2022)
- Ezaki Glico Pocky – "Pocky is Basically an Instrument" (2024)

== Discography ==
=== Albums ===
==== Studio albums ====
- Where's My Potato? (2010)
- I Wanna Go to Hawaii. (2011)
- Schwarzenegger (2012)
- Me No Do Karate. (2013)
- ALXD (2015)
- Exist! (2016)
- Sleepless in Brooklyn (2018)
- But wait. Cats? (2022)
- Provoke (2025)

==== Live albums ====
- Live at Budokan 2014 (2014)
- This Summer Festival 2022 (Live at Tokyo International Forum Hall A 2022.4.28) (2022)

==== Compilation albums ====
- Where's My History? (2021)

==== Concept albums ====
- Bedroom Joule (2020)

=== Singles ===
==== CD singles ====
- "City" (2010)
- "You're So Sweet & I Love You" (2010)
- "言え" (2011)
- "spy" (2011)
- "Kill Me If You Can" (2012)
- "Starrrrrrr" / "Namidaga Koboresou" (2013)
- "Forever Young" (2013)
- "Run Away" / "Oblivion" (2013)
- "Adventure" / "Droshky!" (2014)
- "Wataridori" / "Dracula La" (2015)
- "Girl A" (2015)
- "New Wall" / "I Want U to Love Me" (2016)
- "Swan" (2016)
- "Snow Sound" / "Imamade Kimiganaitabun Torimodosou" (2017)
- "Ashita, Mata" (2017)
- "Kabuto" (2018)
- "Mosquito Bite" (2018)
- "Beast" (2020)
- "Senkou" (2021)
- "Rock The World" / "Hibi, Oriori" (2022)
- "SINGLE 1" (2024)
- "SINGLE 2" (2024)
- "SINGLE 3" (2025)

==== Digital singles ====
- "Rocknrolla!" (2011)
- "Dracula La" (2015)
- "Famous Day" (2015)
- "I Want U to Love Me" (2016)
- "Nawe, Nawe" (2016)
- "Feel Like" (2016)
- "Hanauta (feat. Tahi Saihate)" (2018)
- "Pray" (2019)
- "Tsukiiro Horizon" (2019)
- "Amarinimo Suteki Na Yoru Dakara" (2019)
- "Philosophy (18 Festival Mix)" (2020)
- "Run Away (Bedroom Version)" (2020)
- "Starrrrrrr (Bedroom Version)" (2020)
- "Kaze ni Natte (1 Half Version)" (2021)
- "Senkou (Deluxe Edition)" (2021)
- "Mushin Pakusu (Aoashi Version)" (2022)
- "Baby's Alright" (2022)
- "Senkou (Live at Yoyotai)" (2023)
- "Senkou (TeddyLoid Remix)" (2023)
- "Vanilla Sky (feat. WurtS)" (2023)
- "todayyyyy" (2023)
- "Boy Fearless" (2024)
- "Kinjito" (2025)
- "Koeru" (2025)
- "Ash" (2025)
- "Hallelujah" (2026)
- "Endroll (feat. SennaRin, Hiroyuki SAWANO)" (2026)

== Awards and nominations ==
CD Shop Awards

Year	Nominee / work	Award	Result
2013	Me No Do Karate.	Grand Prix	Nominated
2017	Exist!	Grand Prix	Shortlisted

SBS PopAsia Awards

Year	Nominee / work	Award	Result
2015	[Alexandros]	Best Male Group	Nominated
2015	"Girl A"	Best Song of the Year	Nominated

MTV Europe Music Awards

Year	Nominee / work	Award	Result
2015	[Alexandros]	Best Japanese Act	Nominated

Japan Gold Disc Awards

Year	Nominee / work	Award	Result
2016	[Alexandros]	New Artist of the Year	Won

MTV Video Music Awards Japan

Year	Nominee / work	Award	Result
2016	"Swan"	Best Rock Video	Won

Space Shower Music Awards

Year	Nominee / work	Award	Result
2016	[Alexandros]	Best Rock Artist	Won
2017	[Alexandros]	People's Choice	Won
2019	[Alexandros]	Best Group Artist	Won
2020	[Alexandros]	Best Rock Artist	Nominated
2021	[Alexandros]	Best Group Artist	Nominated
2022	[Alexandros]	Best Rock Artist	Nominated

== Tours and concerts ==
=== Japan ===
- This Summer Festival 2005 (2005)
- This Summer Festival 2007 (2007)
- Where's My Potato? Tour (2010)
- Arabaki Rock Festival with Various Artists (2010)
- Rock in Japan Festival with Various Artists (2010)
- Summer Sonic Festival with Various Artists (2010)
- Rush Ball Festival with Various Artists (2010)
- "City" Release Tour (2010)
- This Summer Festival 2010 with Triceratops and Oceanlane (2010)
- I Wanna Go to Hawaii. Tour (2011)
- Rock in Japan Festival with Various Artists (2011)
- Summer Sonic Festival with Various Artists (2011)
- Me Against The World Tour (2011)
- This Summer Festival 2011 with Nothing's Carved in Stone and A Flood of Circle (2011)
- Kasabian Japan Tour with [Champagne] as supporting act (2012)
- Premium V.I.P. Party 2012 at Shibuya Club Quattro and Shinsaibushi Club Janus (2012)
- Schwarzenegger Tour (2012)
- Rock in Japan Festival with Various Artists (2012)
- Rising Sun Rock Festival with Various Artists (2012)
- Summer Sonic Festival with Various Artists (2012)
- Rush Ball Festival with Various Artists (2012)
- This Summer Festival 2012 with Straightener and Aikara (2012)
- Muse Japan Tour with [Champagne] as supporting act (2013)
- GEROCK Live (2013)
- Venga Venga Tour (2013)
- Million Rock Festival with Various Artists (2013)
- Premium V.I.P. Party 2013 at Zepp DiverCity (2013)
- Rock in Japan Festival with Various Artists (2013)
- Summer Sonic Festival with Various Artists (2013)
- Rush Ball Festival with Various Artists (2013)
- We Don't Learn Anything Tour (2013–2014)
- Primal Scream Japan Tour with [Champagne] as supporting act (2013)
- Welcome! [Champagne] Live at Kawasaki Club Citta (2014)
- Arabaki Rock Festival with Various Artists (2014)
- Japan Jam Festival with Various Artists (2014)
- Tokyo Metropolitan Rock Festival with Various Artists (2014)
- Rock in Japan Festival with Various Artists (2014)
- Wild Bunch Fest with Various Artists (2014)
- Rush Ball Festival with Various Artists (2014)
- Japan Night in TIMM with Vamps and Sakanaction (2014)
- Lithium Rock Festival (2014)
- Premium V.I.P Party 2014 at EX Theater Roppongi (2014)
- This Summer Festival 2014 with Various Artists (2014)
- Welcome! [Alexandros] Live Tour (2015–2016)
- Blaredown Barriers Festival (2015)
- Tokyo Metropolitan Rock Festival with Various Artists (2015)
- [Alexandros] Free Live "Back in Yoyogi Park!" (2015)
- Premium V.I.P. Party 2015 at Nippon Budokan (2015)
- Fuji Rock Festival with Various Artists (2015)
- Rock in Japan Festival with Various Artists (2015)
- Rising Sun Rock Festival with Various Artists (2015)
- Rush Ball Festival with Various Artists (2015)
- Inazuma Rock Festival with Various Artists (2015)
- Gochisou ni Aritsukasete Itadakimasu Tour (2015–2016)
- Space Shower Music Awards (2016)
- Osaka Metropolitan Rock Festival with Various Artists (2016)
- Tokyo Metropolitan Rock Festival with Various Artists (2016)
- Miyako Island Rock Festival (2016)
- Premium V.I.P. Party 2016 at Osaka-jo Hall (2016)
- Dead Pop Festival (2016)
- Tales of Festival (2016)
- Rock in Japan Festival with Various Artists (2016)
- Summer Sonic Festival with Various Artists (2016)
- [Alexandros] & Blossoms (2016)
- We Come In Peace Tour (2016–2017)
- Tokyo Metropolitan Rock Festival with Various Artists (2017)
- V.I.P. Party 2017 at Nippon Gaishi Hall (2017)
- Rock in Japan Festival with Various Artists (2017)
- Rising Sun Rock Festival with Various Artists (2017)
- UKFC On The Road (2017)
- Wild Bunch Fest with Various Artists (2017)
- Rush Ball Festival with Various Artists (2017)
- No Meaning Tour (2017)
- Tsutaya Rock Festival (2018)
- Arabaki Rock Festival (2018)
- Bleach Festival (2018)
- Wild Bunch Fest with Various Artists (2018)
- V.I.P. Party 2018 at Zozo Marine Stadium (2018)
- UKFC On The Road (2018)
- Rush Ball Festival with Various Artists (2018)
- Music and Beards (2018)
- Sleepless In Japan Tour (2018–2019)
- Space Shower Music Awards (2019)
- Japan Jam Festival with Various Artists (2019)
- Osaka Metropolitan Rock Festival with Various Artists (2019)
- Tokyo Metropolitan Rock Festival with Various Artists (2019)
- Rock in Japan Festival with Various Artists (2019)
- Summer Sonic Festival with Various Artists (2019)
- Aquarius x [Alexandros] Special Summer Event (2019)
- Wild Bunch Fest with Various Artists (2019)
- Rush Ball Festival with Various Artists (2019)
- NHK [Alexandros] 18 Festival (2019)
- V.I.P. Tour Kyushu (2019–2020)
- Countdown Japan 19/20 with Various Artists (2019)
- Where's My Tomato? Tour (2020)
- This Summer Festival 2020 (2020)
- UKFC In The Air (2020)
- Rush Ball Festival with Various Artists (2020)
- Spotify presents Tokyo Super Hits Live with Various Artists (2020)
- Countdown Japan 20/21 with Various Artists (2020)
- [Alexandros] 10th Anniversary Live "Where's My Yoyogi?" (2021)
- Japan Jam Festival with Various Artists (2021)
- Aleatoric Tomato Tour (2021)
- Rush Ball Festival with Various Artists (2021)
- Wild Bunch Fest with Various Artists (2021)
- Aleatoric Arena 4 Days (2021)
- Countdown Japan 21/22 with Various Artists (2021)
- Fukuoka Music Fes with Various Artists (2022)
- This Summer Festival 2022 with Sumika (2022)
- But Wait. Tour? (2022–2023)
- Rock in Japan Festival with Various Artists (2022)
- But wait. Arena? at Portmesse Nagoya (2022)
- But wait. Arena? at Osaka-jo Hall (2022)
- But wait. Arena? at Yoyogi National Stadium (2022)
- FM802 Rock Festival "Radio Crazy" with Various Artists (2022)
- Countdown Japan 22/23 with Various Artists (2022)
- Fukuoka Music Fes with Various Artists (2023)
- Rock in Japan Festival with Various Artists (2023)
- Summer Sonic Festival with Various Artists (2023)
- Rush Ball Festival with Various Artists (2023)
- Treasure05X Festival with Various Artists (2023)
- UKFC On The Road (2023)
- Wild Bunch Fest with Various Artists (2023)
- This Summer Festival Tour '23 with Various Artists (2023)
- FM802 Rock Festival "Radio Crazy" with Various Artists (2023)
- Countdown Japan 23/24 with Various Artists (2023)
- Fukuoka Music Fes with Various Artists (2024)
- "Back to School!!" at Aoyama Gakuin University (2024)
- Arabaki Rock Festival with Various Artists (2024)
- Japan Jam Festival with Various Artists (2024)
- Osaka Metropolitan Rock Festival with Various Artists (2024)
- Tokyo Metropolitan Rock Festival with Various Artists (2024)
- SINGLE 1 Tour (2024)
- Wild Bunch Fest with Various Artists (2024)
- Rush Ball Festival with Various Artists (2024)
- Treasure05X Festival with Various Artists (2024)
- Rock in Japan Festival with Various Artists (2024)
- This Fes '24 in Sagamihara with Various Artists (2024)
- Fukuoka Music Fes with Various Artists (2025)
- Provoke Launch Party at Ebisu Garden Hall (2025)
- Provoke Japan Tour (2025)
- UKFC On The Road (2025)
- Rush Ball Festival with Various Artists (2025)
- Rock in Japan Festival with Various Artists (2025)
- Umamusume: Pretty Derby 6th Event "The New Frontier" (2025)
- This Fes '25 in Sagamihara with Various Artists (2025)
- V.I.P. Party 2025 at Toyota Arena Tokyo (2025)
- FM802 Rock Festival "Radio Crazy" with Various Artists (2025)
- Countdown Japan 25/26 with Various Artists (2025)
- Fukuoka Music Fes with Various Artists (2026)
- Blare Fest with Various Artists (2026)
- Hello Arena with Various Artists (2026)
- FC Tour "Access All Area" (2026)
- Ling Tosite Sigure "Tokini Ame #17" with [Alexandros] as supporting act (2026)
- Arabaki Rock Festival with Various Artists (2026)
- A Flood of Circle 20th Anniversary Tour "Road to Nippon Budokan" with [Alexandros] as supporting act (2026)
- Japan Jam Festival with Various Artists (2026)
- Tokyo Metropolitan Rock Festival with Various Artists (2026)
- Osaka Metropolitan Rock Festival with Various Artists (2026)
- Million Rock Festival with Various Artists (2026)
- Tokyo Ska Paradise Orchestra Live House Tour "VerSus Carnival" with [Alexandros] as supporting act (2026)
- You Are Welcome Tour (2026)
- The Star Jam with Macaroni Empitsu (2026)
- Talking Rock! Fes (2026)
- PUFFY's "P" Fes (2026)
- Yokohama Unite Ongakusai presents Orange Range 25th Anniversary Best Hit Champloo with [Alexandros] as supporting act (2026)
- Wild Bunch Fest with Various Artists (2026)
- Treasure05X Festival with Various Artists (2026)
- Rock in Japan Festival with Various Artists (2026)
- Nothing's Carved in Stone "Hand In Hand Tour" with [Alexandros] as supporting act (2026)
- [Alexandros] CREW Members-Only Live at Spotify O-East (2026)
- This Fes '26 in Sagamihara with Various Artists (2026)
- Go!Go!Vanillas presents "Bokura no Taiman Jōtō Tour" with [Alexandros] as supporting act (2027)
- Fukuoka Music Fes with Various Artists (2027)
- Generations Two Man Live Tour with [Alexandros] as supporting act (2027)
- FC Tour "Daikyōen" (2027)
- Dear Enemies Tour (2027)
- V.I.P. Party Tour (2027)
- This Fes '27 in Sagamihara with Various Artists (2027)

=== Overseas ===
- Jisan Valley Rock Festival in South Korea with Various Artists (2012)
- Japan Underground Presents: [Champagne] in UK (2013)
- The Great Escape Festival in UK with Various Artists (2013)
- SXSW Music Festival in US with Various Artists (2014)
- Tokyo Crazy Kawaii Festival in Taiwan with Various Artists (2014)
- Japan Night in Indonesia with Vamps and Tokyo Ska Paradise Orchestra (2015)
- Megaport Music Festival in Taiwan with Various Artists (2015)
- Japan Night in UK with Vamps, Okamoto's and Ling Tosite Sigure (2015)
- Ansan Valley Rock Festival in South Korea with Various Artists (2015)
- SXSW Music Festival in US with Various Artists (2016)
- Super Slippa Festival in Taiwan with Various Artists (2016)
- We Come In Peace Tour in Hong Kong, South Korea and Taiwan (2017)
- Super Slippa Festival in Taiwan with Various Artists (2018)
- USA Tour 2018 in US (2018)
- Live at Paste Studio NYC in US (2018)
- Sleepless in Asia Tour in China, Indonesia, Thailand, Hong Kong, Taiwan, Malaysia and South Korea (2019)
- Anime NYC in US (2022)
- Rush Ball On The Road in Taiwan (2023)
- Super Strawberry Music Festival in China (2024)
- China Tour '24 in China (2024)
- Strawberry Music Festival in China (2024)
- Provoke Asia Tour in South Korea, Thailand, Malaysia, China and Taiwan (2025)
- Asian Kung-Fu Generation 30th Anniversary Special Concert "Thirty Revolutions" in Indonesia with [Alexandros] as supporting act (2026)
- Rush Ball On The Road in Taiwan with Creep Hyp, 04 Limited Sazabys and People 1 (2026)
- Wonderlivet Festival in South Korea with Various Artists (2026)

== See also ==
- Japanese rock
