= Alex Aldi =

American record producer

- Occupations: Producer, engineer, mixer
- Years active: 2005–present
- Website: alexaldi.com

Alex Aldi is an American, New York City-based record producer and mixing engineer, who has worked with bands such as Passion Pit, Magic Man, and Holy Ghost!.

== Discography ==
=== 2018 ===
- Alexandros - Sleepless in Brooklyn - Producer, Arranger, Engineer, Mixing (Universal J/RX-Records)

=== 2016 ===
- Alexandros - Exist! - Mixing (Universal J/RX-Records)

=== 2014 ===
- Magic Man - Before the Waves - Producer, Engineer, Mixing (Neon Gold/Columbia Records)
- Tiny Victories - Haunts - Producer, Engineer, Mixing (The Sleepover Party)

=== 2013 ===
- Gentlemen Hall - All Our Love (Single) - Mixing, Addl. Production (Island Records)
- Passion Pit - Constant Conversations EP - Mixing, Addl. Production (Columbia Records)
- Magic Man - You Are Here - Producer, Engineer, Mixing (Neon Gold/Columbia Records)
- Wildcat! Wildcat! - EP - Mixing (Downtown Records)
- Down With Webster - One In A Million (Single) - Mixing (Universal/Motown)
- Futurbrite - Part I EP - Mixing (Self-Released)
- Hands - Synesthesia - Mixing (Kill Rock Stars)

=== 2012 ===
- Passion Pit - Gossamer - Mixing, Engineer, Addl. Production (Columbia Records)
- Passion Pit - Twilight: Breaking Dawn Pt.2 - Producer, Engineer, Mixing (Atlantic Records/Chop Shop)
- The Hundred in the Hands - Come With Me (Single) - Mixing (Warp Records)

=== 2011 ===
- Holy Ghost! - Holy Ghost! - Mixing, Engineer (DFA)
- Outasight - Figure 8 EP - Mixing (Warner Bros)
- We Barbarians - Headspace EP - Mixing (Beranimal)
- The Chain Gang of 1974 - The Wayward Fire - Mixing (Warner Bros/Modern Art Records)

=== 2010 ===
- Holy Ghost! - Static On The Wire (DFA) - Mixing, Engineer
- Suckers - Wild Smile (Frenchkiss Records) - Mixing, Engineer
- The Hundred in the Hands - The Hundred in the Hands (Warp) - Mixing, Engineer
- Shy Child - Liquid Love (Wall Of Sound) - Mixing, Engineer

=== 2009 ===
- Theophilus London - "Humdrum Town 12" (Green Label Sounds) - Mixing
- Chapel Club - "Surfacing" (Polydor) - Mixing
- Passion Pit - "Manners" (Frenchkiss Records/Columbia) - Mixing, Engineer
- Pepper Rabbit - "Shakes EP" (self released) - Mixing
- Les Savy Fav - "Score! 20 Years Of Merge Records" (Merge Records) - Mixing
- Harlem Shakes - "Technicolor Health" (Gigantic Music) - Mixing, Engineer
- The Rakes - "Klang!" (V2 Records) / Universal Records - Mixing
- The Hundred in the Hands - "Dressed In Dresden" [single] (Pure Groove) - Mixing, Engineer
- Asobi Seksu - "Hush" (Polyvinyl) - Engineer

=== 2008 ===
- The Walkmen - "You & Me" (Gigantic Music) - Engineer
- Tokyo Police Club - "Elephant Shell" (Saddle Creek) - Engineer
- Bridges and Powerlines - "Ghost Types" (Citybird Records) - Mixing
- Frances - "All The While" (Gigantic Music) - Mixing, Engineer

=== 2007 ===
- Les Savy Fav - "Let's Stay Friends" (Frenchkiss Records) - Engineer
- Gregor Samsa - "Rest" (Kora) - Engineer
- White Rabbits - "Fort Nightly" (Say Hey Records) - Mixing
- White Rabbits - "Cotillion Blues" [single] (Gigantic Music) - Mixing
- The Boggs - "Forts" (Gigantic Music) - Mixing Engineer
- Ghastly City Sleep - "Ghastly City Sleep" (Robotic Empire) - Producer, Mixing, Engineer
- Shy Child - "Noise Won't Stop" (Kill Rock Stars) - Engineer
- Aa - "GAame" (Gigantic Music) - Asst. Engineer
- Dragon's Of Zynth - "Xerathyn" [single] (Gigantic Music) - Asst. Engineer
- My Best Fiend - "Acid Happy" [single] (Gigantic Music) - Asst. Engineer
- Asobi Seksu - "Stay Awake" [single] (Gigantic Music) - Asst. Engineer
- Harlem Shakes - "Burning Birthdays" (self-released) - Asst. Engineer

=== 2006 ===
- Asobi Seksu - "Citrus" (Friendly Fire Records) - Asst. Engineer
- Human Television - "Look Who You're Talking To" (Gigantic Music)- Asst. Engineer
- Trick & The Heartstrings - "We're The Hardest" [single] (Good & Evil) - Asst. Engineer
