= Provoke (album) =

2025 studio album by [Alexandros]

Studio album by [Alexandros]
- Released: April 23, 2025
- Genres: Alternative rock, pop rock, experimental rock
- Length: 47:38
- Languages: Japanese, English
- Labels: Polydor Records / RX-Records, Universal Music Japan
- Producer: [Alexandros]

[Alexandros] chronology
This Summer Festival 2022 (Live at Tokyo International Forum Hall A 2022.4.28) (2022)	Provoke (2025)

Singles from Provoke
- 1. "VANILLA SKY" Released: July 21, 2023; 2. "todayyyyy" Released: December 29, 2023; 3. "SINGLE 1" Released: May 15, 2024; 4. "SINGLE 2" Released: September 18, 2024; 5. "SINGLE 3" Released: February 26, 2025; 6. "Koeru" Released: April 6, 2025

Provoke (stylized in all caps) is the ninth studio album by the Japanese rock band [Alexandros]. It was released on April 23, 2025 through Polydor Records and RX-Records under Universal Music Japan, nearly three years after the band's previous studio album, But wait. Cats?, and fifteen years after their debut album, Where's My Potato?. The album contains 15 tracks and includes material released by the band between 2023 and 2025, as well as collaborations with the British band Hard Life and Japanese musician WurtS.

The band began planning Provoke around the end of the recording of But wait. Cats?, developing the album around a predetermined structure while continuing to write material over the following three years. After working with outside producers on Sleepless in Brooklyn and But wait. Cats?, the band returned to self-production for Provoke. Vocalist Yoohei Kawakami said that one of his aims was to create an album with the same combination of planning and impulse that he associated with making the band's first album.

The album peaked at number 11 on the Oricon Albums Chart, number 13 on both the Oricon Daily Albums Chart and the Oricon Combined Albums Chart, and reached number 8 on the Oricon Digital Albums Chart. It also peaked at number 12 on Billboard Japan's Top Albums Sales chart, number 61 on the Hot Albums chart and number 7 on the Download Albums chart.

== Background and recording ==
[Alexandros] released their eighth studio album, But wait. Cats?, in July 2022. During the closing stages of its production, vocalist and songwriter Yoohei Kawakami had already begun considering the structure of the band's next album. For Provoke, the band developed the album around an overall framework, with Kawakami planning a 15-track record and preparing several candidate songs for each position before selecting the final tracklist.

Kawakami described the process as more deliberate than their earlier albums, while still allowing the songs and arrangements to change during production. He also kept parts of his initial conception from the other members, believing that explaining the intended result too fully could lead them to reproduce his plan rather than develop the songs through their own contributions.

The album also marked a return to self-production following the band's collaborations with outside producers on Sleepless in Brooklyn and But wait. Cats?. Kawakami described a long-standing desire to make another record with the combination of preparation and spontaneity that he associated with a debut album, and said that Provoke had fulfilled that aim.

Several songs continued to develop late in the recording process. Kawakami recalled that the title track remained without a clearly determined final form until near the end of production. "FABRIC YOUTH", meanwhile, was arranged mainly by the other three members while Kawakami worked on other material. The arrangement developed from a voice memo of Kawakami singing while playing guitar, which was recorded by drummer Ib Riad.

== Release and promotion ==
The album was announced on March 3, 2025, for release on April 23. It was issued as a standard CD, two limited CD and video editions, and a complete production-limited edition.

The limited editions included footage of both [Alexandros] performances at the band's festival, This Fes '24 in Sagamihara, together with a documentary about the event. The complete production-limited edition additionally included footage from Back to School!!, a concert held at Aoyama Gakuin University, where the band was formed, as well as a rearrangement album titled Changed My Mind, two photo books and a T-shirt.

The band promoted the album with the Provoke Launch Party and the Provoke Japan Tour 2025, which began in May. An Asian tour followed later in the year. A double LP version was released on October 1, 2025.

== Composition and songs ==
Provoke contains 15 tracks. Kawakami wrote the lyrics and music for most of the album, while the arrangement is mostly credited to [Alexandros]. The record includes previously released material alongside songs completed specifically for the album.

=== "PROVOKE" ===
The title track opens the album and incorporates a sample from "Burger Queen", the opening song from the band's debut album, Where's My Potato?. Kawakami also connected the album's title to the band's early use of the words "provoke" and "provocation". Their 2009 demo album Provocation to Noble Artists was reworked into Where's My Potato?, while "Burger Queen", which contains the phrase "this is a provocation to noble artists" (although it was not included on the demo), has frequently been used as the introductory number in their live shows. The spoken word phrases on the track were contributed by both a speech synthesis model and an employee of the band's record company.

=== "JULIUS" ===
"JULIUS" originated during writing sessions held in a meeting room at the band's management office. Because studio time in Tokyo was limited, Kawakami began bringing a small amplifier to the office and wrote several songs there. He later said that it was his favourite track from the album, and that completing "JULIUS" helped him recognize the atmosphere the album would eventually take. The song was used as the theme for the second episode of the Wowow television drama Golden Kamuy: The Hunt of Prisoners in Hokkaido. The version heard in the drama differs slightly from the one on the album, with Kawakami later re-recording portions and altering the mix.

=== "WITH ALL DUE RESPECT" ===
Kawakami wanted the third track, following "PROVOKE" and "JULIUS", to contain the most aggressive and heavily distorted sound on the album. He regarded its rapid vocal delivery as the latest development of a style [Alexandros] had used since their [Champagne] period, lying somewhere between rapping and fast singing. Rather than constructing the melody around guitar chords as he usually did, Kawakami developed the vocal line while singing over the band's performance. The song developed from an unusual guitar riff Kawakami recorded without an amplifier and looped repeatedly. To heighten the deliberately chaotic character of the verses, vocals from a demo containing different words were layered into the final recording so that the passages would be difficult to distinguish clearly.

=== "Koeru" ===
"Koeru" was written as the opening theme for the first cours of the anime television series Umamusume: Cinderella Gray. Kawakami said that he wanted the song to depict the protagonist, Oguri Cap. Several prospective versions were written before the band selected the song that became "Koeru". Its arrangement drops in intensity after the first verse before rising again through the following section, while Kawakami used falsetto in the chorus to reflect what he perceived as the elegance of the characters while running. The arrangement underwent substantial revision during production. An earlier band version was slower, and the members continued changing its rhythm and structure until relatively late in the process. Kawakami recalled that the band spent approximately eight hours working on only four bars of Riad's drums in the song's B-section.

=== "Kinjito" ===
"Kinjito" was first released on "SINGLE 3" and served as the theme song for the TV Asahi drama Private Banker. The drama's staff gave [Alexandros] broad freedom in deciding the musical direction. Kawakami considered several approaches before deciding that the existing demo for "Kinjito" was the best fit for Private Banker.

The song's central rhythm originated from an old recording Kawakami discovered on a voice recorder that his bandmates had given him. The recording contained a drum pattern he believed had been improvised by former drummer Satoyasu Shomura. Kawakami increased its tempo and sent it to Riad, who analysed the pattern before the two further developed it in the studio. They experimented with several approaches, including a four on the floor beat. Kawakami noted it had a resemblance to "Waitress, Waitress!", while Riad described the finished rhythm as an updated use of a pattern common in [Alexandros]' earlier songs.

=== "EVERYBODY KNOWS" ===
"EVERYBODY KNOWS" was developed from one of the oldest demos used for Provoke and had previously been considered for inclusion on the band's preceding album, But wait. Cats?. Its chorus melody remained largely unchanged for several years, although Kawakami initially felt that a strong melody alone was insufficient to finish the song. The band therefore continued revisiting it until he considered the different elements properly balanced. The arrangement was given an ambient character, although Kawakami felt that his vocal delivery naturally introduced a distinctly Japanese sense of melancholy.

=== "Coffee Float (feat. hard life)" ===
The original "Coffee Float" was released on "SINGLE 3". It began in 2023 during writing sessions in the band's management-office meeting room, where "Backseat" and "Afterschool" were also developed. Kawakami and the band initially expected to replace the deliberately dry and rough-sounding demo with a cleaner studio recording, but decided that the atmosphere of the office recording was integral to the song. Kawakami subsequently handed much of its development to Isobe, Shirai and Riad while he concentrated on "Kinjito".

The Provoke version features vocals from Murray Matravers of the British band Hard Life. Matravers and Kawakami had first met when Hard Life visited Japan for Summer Sonic and Kawakami interviewed them for his radio programme, Oto, Okashi, after which the two remained in contact. Their friendship developed further when Matravers visited This Fes '24 in Sagamihara. Kawakami said that he had imagined Matravers singing on "Coffee Float" from an early stage of the song's development and formally approached him about contributing while the album was being mixed. Matravers subsequently recorded a new section for the album version.

=== "Boy Fearless" ===
"Boy Fearless" was previously released on "SINGLE 2" and was written as an inspired song for Kiyoshi Kurosawa's 2024 film Cloud, and was used in the film's promotional material. Kawakami recorded the album's vocals in a studio constructed in the basement of his home, and "Boy Fearless" was recorded before renovations to the room had been completed. He experimented with recording different sections separately rather than following his earlier preference for complete vocal takes, intending to give the sections contrasting vocal personas.

=== "Samechau" ===
"Samechau" was first released as the opening track of "SINGLE 1" in May 2024.

=== "[0602]" ===
"[0602]", pronounced "June 2", is an early demo of "Backseat". Kawakami said the recording reflected his usual approach to making early demos, in which he records ideas directly into voice memos and imitates drums and bass through vocal percussion rather than immediately programming the parts electronically. He said that these deliberately organic demos allow him to communicate the intended character of a song to the other members and recording engineers.

=== "Backseat" ===
"Backseat" was first released on "SINGLE 2" and was used in an advertising campaign for Glico's Pocky. The song originated while the band was working in the studio and Kawakami asked support keyboardist Rosé to improvise a chord progression that he might like. Kawakami sang melodies over her playing, with the eventual chorus emerging first. The lyrics were partly inspired by a friend of Kawakami's who had recently experienced a breakup. References to Men I Trust and Zepp venues were drawn from Kawakami's own experience of attending a Men I Trust concert.

Kawakami re-recorded his lead vocals for the Provoke version. He said that he had been recovering from a cold during the "SINGLE 2" session and felt that the original performance sounded noticeably nasal. The album version therefore uses a new vocal recording and a slightly altered mix.

=== "VANILLA SKY 2 (feat. WurtS)" ===
"VANILLA SKY 2 (feat. WurtS)" is a rearranged version of the band's 2023 single "VANILLA SKY (feat. WurtS)". The existing vocal recordings by Kawakami and WurtS were retained rather than re-recorded, while the instrumental arrangement was updated to reflect changes that had developed through live performances; Isobe specifically described the bass part as using the band's live arrangement. Kawakami said that his vocals had been recorded around a month after he underwent surgery to correct a nasal septum condition.

=== "FABRIC YOUTH" ===
"FABRIC YOUTH" was principally arranged by Isobe, Shirai and Riad while Kawakami was occupied with other songs during the final stages of the album's production. It originated from a spontaneous recording of Kawakami singing with acoustic guitar in his home studio. Riad separated the guitar and vocal material, after which the other three members built the arrangement around it. Some of Kawakami's demo was retained because the band felt that the song's character was lost when additional instruments were added. This song was also the first [Alexandros] song in which Shirai used a 12-string guitar. He had been encouraged to play one years earlier by his former guitar teacher, and remembered that advice while arranging "FABRIC YOUTH".

=== "todayyyyy" ===
"todayyyyy" was initially released digitally on December 29, 2023, and was later included on "SINGLE 1". It was written as a collaboration song for the mobile game Monster Strike and was also used as the theme for the two-part Monster Strike animation Masamune: Shimei no Akaki Yaiba. Kawakami described its central idea as "moving beyond simply holding onto a dream" and connected the repeated resilience of the character Masamune with the band's own history of continuing after setbacks. The song also introduced synth bass into their recordings, which Isobe described as a new challenge for him.

=== "Afterschool" ===
"Afterschool" was first released on "SINGLE 1" and served as an ending theme for TV Tokyo's business news programme World Business Satellite. Kawakami and Riad wrote the song in the band's management office meeting room after Kawakami attended a Phoebe Bridgers concert. He was attracted to what he perceived as a sense of youthfulness in Bridgers' performance and attempted to capture a related quality, while accepting that [Alexandros]' version naturally developed a more melancholic character.

After considering several possibilities for the album's closing track, Kawakami selected "Afterschool" because he wanted the ending of Provoke to suggest that something new was about to begin. Kawakami also described the song as being addressed to somebody he had only just met, and hoped that it could encourage listeners encountering the band for the first time, even during the comparatively brief encounter of a festival performance.

== Changed My Mind ==
Changed My Mind

Studio album by [Alexandros]
- Released: April 23, 2025
- Genre: Alternative rock
- Length: 39:50
- Languages: Japanese, English
- Labels: Polydor Records / RX-Records, Universal Music Japan
- Producer: [Alexandros]

Singles from Changed My Mind
- 1. "we are still kids & stray cats (:D)" Released: April 23, 2025

The complete production-limited edition of Provoke includes Changed My Mind, a nine-track rearrangement album consisting of newly recorded versions of songs from [Alexandros]' earlier catalogue. The band selected songs whose arrangements had changed substantially through live performance and further rearranged them for the album. The disc has a total runtime of 39 minutes and 50 seconds.

With the exception of "Mayonaka (Drive Version)", due to it being an existing arrangement since the band's amateur period, the song titles use the suffix "(:D)", which is read as "smile". Three of the rearrangements had previously been released: "Girl A (:D)" appeared on "SINGLE 1", "Mayonaka (Drive Version)" on "SINGLE 2" and "Stimulator (:D)" on "SINGLE 3".

"we are still kids & stray cats (:D)" was released as a digital single on the day of the album's release.

=== Changed My Mind track listing ===
No.	Title	Length
1.	"LAST MINUTE (:D)"	5:09
2.	"Mayonaka (Drive Version)"	4:49
3.	"Kill Me If You Can (:D)"	4:21
4.	"Stimulator (:D)"	3:15
5.	"Dracula La (:D)"	3:42
6.	"todayyyyy (:D)"	3:46
7.	"Swan (:D)"	4:24
8.	"Girl A (:D)"	4:09
9.	"we are still kids & stray cats (:D)"	6:15
Total length:		39:50

== Track listing ==
All tracks are written by Yoohei Kawakami, except tracks 7 and 12.

No.	Title	Writer(s)	Arrangement	Length
1.	"PROVOKE"		[Alexandros]	1:31
2.	"JULIUS"		[Alexandros]	2:27
3.	"WITH ALL DUE RESPECT"		[Alexandros]	3:14
4.	"Koeru"		[Alexandros]	4:02
5.	"Kinjito"		[Alexandros]	4:22
6.	"EVERYBODY KNOWS"		[Alexandros]	4:07
7.	"Coffee Float (feat. hard life)"	[Alexandros], Murray Matravers & Taka Perry	[Alexandros]	3:05
8.	"Boy Fearless"		[Alexandros]	3:17
9.	"Samechau"		[Alexandros]	2:36
10.	"[0602]"		[Alexandros]	1:33
11.	"Backseat"		[Alexandros]	3:31
12.	"VANILLA SKY 2 (feat. WurtS)"	[Alexandros], WurtS	[Alexandros], WurtS	2:44
13.	"FABRIC YOUTH"		[Alexandros]	3:47
14.	"todayyyyy"		[Alexandros]	3:49
15.	"Afterschool"			3:25
Total length:				47:38

== Personnel ==
Credits are retrieved from the album's liner notes, which are written in English.

=== [Alexandros] ===
- Yoohei Kawakami – vocals, guitar, writer, producer, arranger, translator (as Yopeko Toda)
- Hiroyuki Isobe – bass, backing vocals, producer, arranger
- Masaki Shirai – guitar, producer, arranger
- Ib Riad – drums, producer, arranger

=== Additional personnel ===
- Murray Matravers (of Hard Life) – guest vocals and programming on track 7; lyricist on track 7
- WurtS – guest vocals and programming on track 12; lyricist and co-arranger on track 12
- Rosé (of The Led Snail) – keyboards on tracks 1, 5, 6, 11, 12 and 14
- Mullon (of The Led Snail) – guitar on track 1; guitar inspiration on track 7
- Takashi Saze – programming on tracks 1, 5–9, 11, 12, 14 and 15; co-producer on tracks 7–9, 14 and 15
- Taka Perry – co-writer on track 7
- Risa Taniguchi – programming on track 1
- Yasuko Murata Strings – violin and viola on track 6
- SAK. – backing vocals on track 6
- Lyn Inaizumi – backing vocals on track 6
- Hiromu "Cillian" Yasumoto – programming on track 12; recording and vocal recording engineer (Studio Sunshine, Tokyo)
- Liam Mockridge – co-producer on track 15
- Liam Nolan – mixing on tracks 1, 7, 8 and 12 (Metropolis Studios, London)
- Gregory Germain (Fader Crafters) – recording engineer on tracks 2–4; mixing engineer on tracks 2, 3, 6 and 11
- Norikatsu Teruuchi – recording engineer on tracks 9 and 14; mixing engineer on tracks 4, 5, 9, 14 and 15 (Aobadai Studio)
- Madoka Kambe – recording engineer on tracks 8 and 15
- Akiyoshi Tanaka (Bigfish) – recording engineer on track 11
- Fumiaki Unehara – recording engineer on track 12
- Naoyuki Matsumoto – vocal recording engineer on track 13 (Universal Music Studios, Harajuku)
- Mitsutaka Seki (Mixer's Lab) – mixing engineer on track 13
- Takeo Kira (TEMAS) – mastering engineer
- Amme – design
- Zhannat Podobed – design
- Maki Sakate (Vicca) – hair and makeup
- Jun Ishikawa – styling
- Kojiro Kawai – styling assistant
- Shohei Hayashi – photography
- Yuto Kudo – photography
- Michiyo Goda (Universal Music Japan) – artwork coordination
- Nahoko Matsubayashi (Polydor Records) – project leader
- Masao Hata (Polydor Records) – A&R
- Daigo Aonuma (Polydor Records) – marketing planning
- Akane Iwagami (Polydor Records) – marketing planning
- Gen Takemoto (Polydor Records) – media promotion
- Akira Yaji (Polydor Records) – media promotion
- Tomohiko Tanaka (Polydor Records) – media promotion
- Miyuki Ito (Polydor Records) – media promotion
- Nahomi Murata (Polydor Records) – media promotion
- Hiromu Komatsu (Polydor Records) – media promotion
- Kaori Kanbara (Polydor Records) – media promotion
- Yasutaka Meguro (Universal Music Japan) – sales promotion
- Norie Oki (Polydor Records) – international strategy
- Chie Watanabe (Polydor Records) – desk
- Ikki Chida (UKPM / RX-Records) – artist manager, executive producer
- Kunitaka Ito (UKPM Inc.) – artist manager
- Riku Hirakawa (UKPM Inc.) – artist manager
- Kazuhiro Imanari (Polydor Records) – executive producer

Acknowledgements

- Hideaki Iwashita (Livemasters Inc.)
- Yuki Murata (Livemasters Inc.)
- Takito Horio (Livemasters Inc.)
- Somei Rikitake (Greens Corporation)
- Akiko Toda (Greens Corporation)
- Kotaro Mase (Sunday Folk Promotion)
- Akio Igarashi (Smash East)
- Saori Taketani (Yumebanchi)
- Kei Yoshida (BEA)
- Yasunobu Edo (Duke)
- Wataru Sasaki (GIP)
- Noriko Shimizu (FOB)
- Kazuyoshi Hasegawa (Moridaira)
- Masanori Watanabe
- Tatsuya Taniyama (Yamaha Music Japan Co., Ltd.)
- Tomokaz Kawamura (LEP International Co., Ltd.)
- Shunsaku Tsuji (Sakae Osaka Heritage)
- Yukihiro Hayashi (Free The Tone Ltd.)
- Kazumori Iida (Boss Corporation)
- Tomoyuki Yamamoto (Gibson Guitar Corp. Japan)
- Taisuke Imamura
- The band's families, friends and fans

== Charts ==
=== Daily charts ===
Chart	Peak position
Japan Daily Albums (Oricon)	13

=== Weekly charts ===
Chart	Peak position
Japan Albums (Oricon)	11
Japan Combined Albums (Oricon)	13
Japan Digital Albums (Oricon)	8
Japan Hot Albums (Billboard)	61
Japan Top Albums Sales (Billboard)	12
Japan Download Albums (Billboard)	7

== Release history ==
Regions	Date	Formats	Label	Ref.
Japan	April 23, 2025	CD, DVD, digital download	Polydor Records / RX-Records	
Worldwide	April 23, 2025	Digital download, streaming	Polydor Records / RX-Records	
Japan	October 1, 2025	Double LP	Polydor Records / RX-Records	
