= Ib Riad =

Japanese musician (born 1985)

Ib Riad リアド偉武
- Born: October 25, 1985 (age 40); Tokyo, Japan
- Genres: Melodic hardcore; alternative rock; J-pop; pop-punk
- Occupation: Musician
- Instruments: Drums; programming
- Years active: 2001–present
- Member of: [Alexandros]
- Formerly of: Bigmama

Ib Riad (Japanese: リアド 偉武, Hepburn: Riado Ibu; born October 25, 1985) is a Japanese musician. He is the drummer of the rock band [Alexandros], having joined the band as an official member in 2021. He was previously a founding member and drummer of the rock band Bigmama.

== Early life ==
Riad was born in Tokyo to an Egyptian father and a Japanese mother. His older sister, Geylan Riad, is a freelance announcer. During high school, he became friends with Masato Kanai, with whom he would later form Bigmama.

Riad began playing music during his first year of high school after seeing a performance by the band Totalfat at a school festival. In his second year, he formed a band with Kanai, Hiroya Kakinuma and another member. Mao Higashide joined the group in their third year to play violin, leading to the five-member lineup that developed into Bigmama.

== Career ==
=== 2001–2020: Bigmama ===
Riad was a founding member of Bigmama alongside Kanai and Kakinuma. The band developed from their high-school group and became known for incorporating violin into their sound. Riad performed primarily on drums and also contributed programming. Bigmama began releasing music through RX-Records in 2006.

In December 2019, Bigmama announced that Riad would leave the band following their "Roclassick tour 2020". Riad said that he wanted to begin a new adventure as a drummer and explore his potential outside the band. He left the band in May 2020.

=== 2021–present: [Alexandros] ===
Riad first performed with [Alexandros] in 2019, when drummer Satoyasu Shomura took a leave of absence from live performances due to focal dystonia. [Alexandros] announced in April 2019 that Riad would serve as a support drummer for several performances, and he subsequently became their principal support drummer during Shomura's absence.

Riad subsequently participated in [Alexandros]' live performances and studio sessions. He also appeared in their music videos, including "Tsukiiro Horizon". His work with them developed into a permanent position following Shomura's retirement from the band in March 2021.

On April 10, 2021, [Alexandros] announced that Riad had officially joined the band as their drummer. In a statement accompanying the announcement, Riad said that he wanted to continue moving forward with Yoohei Kawakami, Hiroyuki Isobe and Masaki Shirai, and described his work with the band in live performances, recording sessions and rehearsals as a major source of inspiration.

Since joining [Alexandros], Riad has also contributed to the band's use of programmed and electronic percussion. In a later interview with Music Natalie, he discussed producing some material entirely through drum programming rather than live drumming, while considering how such arrangements could be adapted for live performance.

== Personal life ==
Riad describes himself as a cat lover and has frequently shared photographs of cats.

He has a hobby of photography, and he has participated in several photography-related projects, including taking photos of cats and landscapes for [Alexandros]' official fan club.

He married in 2021, and has two children.

He is a fan of the association football club Real Madrid.

== Discography ==
=== Bigmama ===
==== Studio albums ====
- Love and Leave
- Dowsing For The Future
- And Yet, It Moves
- Roclassick
- Until The Blouse Is Buttoned Up
- The Vanishing Bride
- Fabula Fibula
- -11℃
