= Hiroyuki Isobe =

Japanese musician (born 1982)

Hiroyuki Isobe 磯部寛之
- Isobe in 2016

Background information
- Born: December 29, 1982 (age 43); Nisshin, Aichi, Japan
- Genres: Alternative rock; pop-punk; J-pop
- Occupations: Musician; radio host; actor
- Instruments: Bass guitar; vocals; keyboards
- Years active: 2001–present
- Labels: UK Project; RX-Records; Universal Music Japan; Polydor Records
- Member of: [Alexandros]

Hiroyuki Isobe (Japanese: 磯部 寛之, Hepburn: Isobe Hiroyuki; born December 29, 1982) is a Japanese musician. He is the bassist and backing vocalist of the rock band [Alexandros].

== Early life ==
Isobe was born in Nisshin, Aichi. Due to his father's work, he moved with his family to Los Angeles while in the fifth grade of elementary school. He attended a local school there until shortly before entering high school. After returning to Japan, he was admitted to International Christian University High School through its admissions programme for returnee students.

Soon after entering high school, Isobe became interested in the bass guitar after seeing a friend play the instrument. He later recalled that he began playing because he thought the bass looked cool.

In April 2001, Isobe entered the Faculty of Law at Aoyama Gakuin University. There he met Yoohei Kawakami, who convinced him to join his band, [Champagne]. According to Isobe, Kawakami approached him about joining the band at a time when Isobe was feeling discouraged after being rejected by his then-girlfriend. The band initially played at small live venues and as a street act, performing mostly in Yoyogi Park.

== Career ==
After graduating from Aoyama Gakuin University in March 2007, Isobe joined a manufacturing company. He was soon transferred to Fukuoka, but continued travelling between Fukuoka and Tokyo on weekends to participate in band activities. After approximately three years working as a salaried employee, he left the company, citing the physical and financial difficulties of maintaining his job while continuing musical activities.

In 2021, Rittor Music published a 130-page special edition of Bass Magazine dedicated to Isobe. The publication featured interviews tracing his career, childhood photographs, new material, his bass collection and live photographs.

From September 2022, Isobe has written the recurring column, titled "Suiteki no Ladder", for the monthly magazine Otona no Shumatsu, documenting his visits to bars and other establishments while exploring food and drink culture. He is also the host of the show Gorilla Radio! on ZIP-FM.

In 2026, he made his acting debut in the taiga drama Brothers in Arms, portraying the Sengoku-period warlord Chōsokabe Motochika. He first appeared in the drama's tenth episode, which was broadcast on March 15, 2026.

In the same year, Isobe collaborated with Toranomon Distillery to produce an original craft gin, "Ladderist's Novel", inspired by his "Suiteki no Ladder" column. The gin was accompanied by an interview and a release event through Otona no Shumatsu.

== Personal life ==
Isobe is known for his strong interest in alcohol and frequently participates in bar-hopping, which also became the subject of his recurring "Suiteki no Ladder" column. He has described himself as a longtime reader of Otona no Shumatsu prior to him writing the column.

As a child, Isobe created a character named "Obataro", who he continues to draw. The character has subsequently been used on [Alexandros] merchandise.

As a child, he played the euphonium as a member of his school's brass band.
