= Masaki Shirai =

Japanese musician (born 1982)

Masaki Shirai 白井眞輝
- Shirai in 2016

Background information
- Born: December 12, 1982 (age 43); Sagamihara, Kanagawa, Japan
- Genres: Alternative rock; pop-punk; J-pop
- Occupation: Musician
- Instruments: Guitar; bass
- Years active: 2007–present
- Labels: UK Project; RX-Records; Universal Music Japan; Polydor Records
- Member of: [Alexandros]; Solm

Masaki Shirai (Japanese: 白井 眞輝, Hepburn: Shirai Masaki; born December 12, 1982) is a Japanese musician, best known as the lead guitarist of the rock band [Alexandros].

== Early life ==
Shirai was born in Sagamihara, Kanagawa Prefecture, Japan. He began playing guitar during his third year of middle school. He initially had no intention of pursuing music professionally, but became interested in doing so after performing at a high school cultural festival, where he experienced playing in front of a large audience.

While attending Yaei West High School, Shirai was a classmate of vocalist and guitarist Yoohei Kawakami. The two formed a band to perform at their school festival and played Oasis covers. After graduating from high school, Shirai attended and graduated from SHOBI College of Music, where he studied in the Professional Musician Department.

== Career ==
=== 2006–2014: [Champagne] ===
After high school, Shirai and Kawakami lost contact while pursuing different paths. In the summer of 2006, Shirai was performing as a bassist with a three-piece punk rock band at Yoyogi Park when he unexpectedly encountered Kawakami, who was performing there with his band [Champagne]. Shirai's band was preparing to disband, and after the two reconnected, Kawakami invited him to join his group as a guitarist.

Shirai initially joined [Champagne] as a support rhythm guitarist in 2006 before becoming an official member in 2007, where he took on lead guitar due to the departure of Kenichiro Mihara. He has remained the band's lead guitarist since then.

=== 2014–present: [Alexandros] ===
Shortly after [Champagne] changed their name to [Alexandros] in 2014 following a request from the Comité Interprofessionnel du vin de Champagne (CIVC), they signed a global partnership agreement with Universal Music, making their major-label debut in 2015.

On April 16, 2020, Shirai launched a YouTube channel during the period in which the COVID-19 pandemic restricted [Alexandros]' activities. On the channel, he posts videos covering his guitars and effects equipment, tutorials on how to play [Alexandros] songs on guitar, demonstrations of his own playing, cooking and other aspects of his daily life.

In April 2026, Guitar Magazine began publishing "Enji no Ma", a monthly column written by Shirai focusing on guitar playing, music and his recent activities.

== Personal life ==
Shirai announced on December 30, 2022 that he had married in 2021 and that his first child had been born earlier in 2022.

Shirai has spoken publicly about his interest in cats and has featured his cats in videos on his YouTube channel.
