= Exist! =

Studio album by [Alexandros]
- Released: November 9, 2016
- Studio: Factory 1994 (Tokyo)
- Genres: J-pop, Alternative rock, pop rock, pop-punk, experimental rock
- Length: 56:59
- Languages: English, Japanese
- Label: Universal J / RX-Records
- Producer: [Alexandros]

[Alexandros] chronology
| ALXD (2015) | Exist! (2016) | Sleepless in Brooklyn (2018) |

Singles from Exist!
- 1. "Girl A" Released: December 2, 2015; 2. "New Wall" / "I Want U to Love Me" Released: April 20, 2016; 3. "Swan" Released: August 24, 2016; 4. "Snow Sound" / "Imamade Kimiganaitabun Torimodosou" Released: February 1, 2017

Alternative cover
- Digipak and LP release cover

Exist! (stylized in all caps) is the sixth studio album by the Japanese rock band [Alexandros]. It was released on November 9, 2016, through Universal J and RX-Records. A limited-edition vinyl version followed on December 7, 2016. The album includes the previously released singles "Girl A", "New Wall", "I Want U to Love Me" and "Swan".

It debuted at number one on both the Oricon Albums Chart and Billboard Japan Hot Albums chart, selling 59,167 copies during its first week. It was the band's first number-one album in Japan. The Recording Industry Association of Japan certified it gold for sales of more than 100,000 copies.

== Background ==
Exist! was released approximately one year and five months after the band's fifth studio album, ALXD. It was the band's second studio album released through their major-label partnership with Universal Music.

The album's title was taken from a demo album that the band had produced before their debut. Copies of the demo were sent to talent agencies and sold by the band during street performances.

The album contains several songs that had previously been released as singles. "Girl A" was issued in December 2015, followed by the double A-side single "New Wall" / "I Want U to Love Me" in April 2016 and "Swan" in August 2016.

== Recording and composition ==
All of the album's songs were written and composed by vocalist Yoohei Kawakami and arranged by [Alexandros]. Japanese-language adaptations of several tracks were credited to Yopeko Toda, an alias of Kawakami's used as an homage to Natsuko Toda, as credited in the album's liner notes.

"Buzz Off!" and "Kusottarena Kisamarae" were recorded as full-band live takes, with the members performing together rather than recording their parts separately. Kawakami conceived "Kaiju" after learning through news reports that Shin Godzilla was being produced. He said that a riff and melody immediately came to him, after which the band completed the song and sent it unsolicited to Toho in the hope that it might be used as the film's theme, though it was not selected.

== Release and promotion ==
Exist! was released on November 9, 2016, in a standard edition and two limited CD/DVD editions. All three CD editions included a serial number allowing purchasers to enter an advance ticket lottery for the band's 2016–2017 We Come in Peace Tour.

Limited edition A included a DVD containing footage from the band's Premium V.I.P. Party concert at Osaka-jō Hall in June 2016. Although promoted as containing the main concert performance, the songs "Spy" and "Swan", which were performed at the event, were omitted. Limited edition B included a DVD titled [Alexandros] Music Video Compilation. It contained six music videos with an optional audio commentary by the band members. A made-to-order vinyl edition was released on December 7, 2016.

Music videos were produced for the album tracks "Moon Song", "Kaiju" and "Feel Like", in addition to the videos for its previously released singles.

== Songs ==
=== "Moon Song" ===
"Moon Song" was used as a selectable on-ride soundtrack for Universal Studios Japan's Hollywood Dream – The Ride for a limited period beginning on November 8, 2016. It was subsequently featured in a Sumitomo Mitsui card commercial promoting Apple Pay, which began airing in December 2016.

=== "Girl A" ===
"Girl A" served as the opening theme for the Kansai TV and Fuji TV drama series Siren.

=== "Feel Like" ===
"Feel Like" was used in a television commercial for the clothing brand Global Work.

=== "Aoyama" ===
"Aoyama" accompanied a promotional collaboration for the Audio Technica Sound Reality series wireless headphones.

=== "Nawe, Nawe" ===
"Nawe, Nawe" served as the theme song for the Japanese release of the film The Legend of Tarzan (known as Tarzan: Reborn in Japan). It was praised by both David Yates, the film's director, and Alexander Skårsgard, who played the lead role.

=== "Buzz Off!" ===
"Buzz Off!" was used in NTT Docomo's student-discount commercial, titled "Ayanosandros?", featuring actor Go Ayano with the band.

=== "Swan" ===
"Swan" served as the theme song for the television drama Atypical Crime Investigator, Hinako Todo.

=== "I Want U to Love Me" ===
"I Want U to Love Me" was used as the theme for the second season of the television drama Take Me To Love & Meal and in commercials for NEC's LaVie computers and the music-streaming service KKBox.

=== "Imamade Kimiganaitabun Torimodosou" ===
"Imamade Kimiganaitabun Torimodosou" was later used as the theme song for the 2017 film Closest Love To Heaven and was later released as part of the double A-side single "Snow Sound" / "Imamade Kimiganaitabun Torimodosou" in February 2017.

=== "New Wall" ===
"New Wall" served as the theme song for the mobile game Tales of the Rays.

== Track listing ==
All tracks are written by Yoohei Kawakami.

| No. | Title | Length |
|---|---|---|
| 1. | "Moon Song" | 4:20 |
| 2. | "Kaiju" | 3:41 |
| 3. | "Girl A" | 2:54 |
| 4. | "Claw" | 3:18 |
| 5. | "O2" | 4:13 |
| 6. | "Feel Like" | 2:42 |
| 7. | "Aoyama" | 4:29 |
| 8. | "Nawe, Nawe" | 4:51 |
| 9. | "Buzz Off!" | 4:03 |
| 10. | "Kusottarena Kisamarae" | 4:54 |
| 11. | "Swan" | 4:30 |
| 12. | "I Want U to Love Me" | 4:26 |
| 13. | "Imamade Kimiganaitabun Torimodosou" | 4:29 |
| 14. | "New Wall" | 4:02 |
| 15. | "[Secret Track]" (CD only) | 2:09 |
| Total length: | | 59:08 61:15(CD) |

== Limited edition DVDs ==
=== Limited edition A ===
==== Premium V.I.P. Party 2016 at Osaka-jō Hall ====
The DVD contains live footage from the band's June 2016 concert at Osaka-jō Hall. The performed songs "Spy" and "Swan" were not included in the release.

=== Limited edition B ===
==== [Alexandros] Music Video Compilation ====
The DVD contains six music videos with optional commentary by the members of [Alexandros]:

- "Wataridori"
- "Girl A"
- "New Wall"
- "I Want U to Love Me"
- "Swan"
- "Feel Like"

== Personnel ==
Credits are retrieved from the album's liner notes, which are written in English.

=== [Alexandros] ===
- Yoohei Kawakami – vocals, guitar, producer
- Hiroyuki Isobe – bass, chorus, producer
- Masaki Shirai – guitar, producer
- Satoyasu Shomura – drums, producer

=== Additional personnel ===
- Rose (of The Led Snail) – keyboards
- Kei Kusama (Kurid) – programming
- Takashi Saze – programming
- Yasuko Murata Strings – strings
- James – chorus on track 8
- Swinky – chorus on track 8
- Suginami Junior Chorus – chorus on track 10
- Murata Family – chorus on track 14
- Hiroyuki Moriyasu (Factory 1994) – recording, director
- Alex Aldi – mixing on tracks 5 and 7 (The Glassfactory, Brooklyn, New York)
- Neil Comber – mixing on tracks 3, 8 and 11–14 (Miloco Studios)
- Neeraj Khajanchi – mixing on tracks 1, 2, 4, 6, 9 and 10 (NK Sound, Tokyo)
- Ted Jensen – mastering (Sterling Sound)
- Daichi Takahashi (Daichigumi & Co.) – sound coordinator, equipment technician
- Nahoko Matsubayashi (Universal J) – project leader
- Kenjiro Tsutsumi (Universal J) – A&R
- Asami Iwamoto (Universal J) – artist promotion
- Yasutaka Meguro (Universal Music) – sales promotion
- Eisuke Kimura (Universal Music) – sales promotion
- Michiyo Goda (Universal Music) – product coordination
- Yusuke Yoshinaga (Solla Inc.) – art direction, design
- Kaede Isoda (Solla Inc.) – design
- Kentaro Kambe – [Alexandros] photography
- Mark Laita – cover photography
- Maki Sakate (Vicca) – hair and makeup
- Ikki Chida (UKPM / RX-Records) – artist manager, label producer
- Kunitaka Ito (UKPM) – artist manager
- Masahiro Kazumoto (Universal J) – label producer

=== Acknowledgements ===
- Hideaki Iwashita (Livemasters Inc.)
- Somei Rikitake (Greens Corporation)
- Akiko Toda (Greens Corporation)
- Kotaro Mase (Sunday Folk Promotion)
- Akio Garashi (Smash East)
- Saori Taketani (Yumebanchi)
- Yushi Mori (BEA)
- Akihiro Misumi (BEA)
- Yasunobu Edo (Duke)
- Wataru Sasaki (GIP)
- Noriko Shimizu (FOB)
- Miyuki Yang (Creativeman Productions)
- Khan Rukhsana (Puffin Entertainment Ltd.)
- Stephanie Pun (Puffin Entertainment Ltd.)
- Kazuyoshi Hasegawa (Moridaira)
- Masanori Watanabe (Yamaha Music Japan Co., Ltd.)
- Mitsuaki Odanaka (Hoshino Gakki Co., Ltd.)
- Tomokaz Kawamura (LEP International Co., Ltd.)
- Yukihiro Hayashi (Free The Tone, Ltd.)
- Kazumori Iida (Boss Corporation)
- Keiko Sudo (Mistral Film)
- Hitoshi Yoshioka (Metropolis Studios)
- The band's families, friends and fans

== Charts ==
=== Weekly charts ===
| Chart | Peak position |
|---|---|
| Japanese Albums (Oricon) | 1 |
| Japan Hot Albums (Billboard) | 1 |

=== Year-end charts ===
| Chart | Position |
|---|---|
| Japanese Albums (Oricon) | 54 |

== Certifications ==
| Region | Certification | Certified units/sales |
|---|---|---|
| Japan (RIAJ) | Gold | 100,000^{^} |

== Release history ==
| Region | Date | Formats | Label | Ref. |
|---|---|---|---|---|
| Japan | November 9, 2016 | CD, DVD, digital download | Universal J / RX-Records | |
| Worldwide | November 9, 2016 | Digital download, streaming | Universal J / RX-Records | |
| United States | January 13, 2017 | CD, DVD | Caroline Records | |
| European Union | January 13, 2017 | CD, DVD | Wrasse Records | |
| Taiwan | January 13, 2017 | CD, DVD | Universal Taiwan | |
