= Oceanlane =

Japanese rock band

- Origin: Tokyo
- Genre: Rock
- Years active: 2001 – 2012
- Label: Handicraft Recordings
- Past members: Hajime Takei; Kay Naoe; Takeshi Horikoshi; Masashi Shimada

Oceanlane were a Japanese rock band from Tokyo. The band formed in 2001 by two longtime friends, Hajime Takei and Kay Naoe, who began playing shows with hired drums and bass players in the Tokyo area in 2002. They self-released a 2003 demo EP, and signed to Howling Bull Entertainment/Handicraft Recordings, who released their debut LP, On my way back home. This album reached #1 on Japan's independent music charts. A follow-up LP, Kiss&Kill, which was produced by Pelle Gunnerfeldt, followed in 2005. In the interim, the band toured nationally in Japan and supported many Western acts on the Japan legs of their tours, including Jimmy Eat World, All-American Rejects, The Stills, and Copeland. They also appeared on the winter leg of the Vans Warped Tour 2004. Since 2004, bassist Takeshi Horikoshi (henrytennis, former bungee jump festival) and drummer Masashi “Marcy” Shimada (buddhistson, kamomekamome) have recorded and toured with Oceanlane and have become more or less permanent members of the band.

== Discography ==
=== Singles ===
- out of reason (2004.08.04) JPN #111
  - All You Miss / Answer to This Flower / Sign *acoustic version
- Walk Along (2007.07.04) JPN #46
  - Walk Along / Tell Me Why / Feel More Alive / Englishman In New York
- Twisted Colors (2008.03.05) JPN #80
  - I May Be / Better Believe Me / Falling In Love With TV Stars / Tomo's Lullaby
- Look Inside the Mirror (2008.11.05) JPN #117
  - So Alone / Look Inside the Mirror / Light Up My Soul

=== Albums ===
- On my way back home (2004.02.04) JPN #179
  - Everlasting Scene / Sign / Ships and Stars / Haze in Heart / Million / Terminal / Ten Second Illusion / Broken Wings / Scent of the air / Fade in Time / All You Miss *Bonus Track / Answer to This Flower *Bonus Track
- Kiss&Kill (2005.11.02) JPN #68
  - Take Me Home / Burn / Velvet Love / Pearls / Here It Comes / The Sun / Tomorrow / Marathon High School / Golden Buzz / My Wristwatch
- Castle In The Air (2007.09.05) JPN #53
  - Ride The Wave / Walk Along / Ivory Serenade / Fighter Pilot / Get Back / Name / Absent In The Spring / Bittersweet Ending / Let's Roll / Last Call / Good Night My Blue Sapphire / Tell Me Why
- Crossroad (2009.01.07) JPN #42
  - Standing On My Side / Shine On Me / I'll Be Around / I May Be / Lights Up My Soul / Enemy / When Did I Say I Had Enough? / Malibu Coke / Look Inside the Mirror / Promise / Foxwood Valley / Where Do We Go? / Ghost Of a Man / Love Won't Last the Night
- Urban Sonnet (2010.12.08) JPN #98
  - Submarine Volcano / You're Just Everything / Gloria / You're In A Cage / Singing In The Rain Again / Blue Satellite / Falling Down / Battleground (Unwarmed Sound) / You Don't Belong To Me / Kites And Buttenlies / The Ones / It's Alright / Start Today / Cries Of The Wolves

=== Limited CDs ===
- Everlasting Scene (2003.03.10)
  - Everlasting Scene / Fade in Time
- Sign (2003.12.10)
  - Sign / Fade in Time
- On my way back home -Special Edition- (2005.06.07)
  - Everlasting Scene / Sign / Ships and Stars / Haze in Heart / Million / Terminal / Ten Second Illusion / Broken Wings / Scent of the air / Fade in Time / All You Miss / Answer to This Flower / Sign *acoustic version
