= SennaRin =

Japanese singer

SennaRin 茜雫 凛
- Born: September 23, 2001 (age 24); Fukuoka, Fukuoka Prefecture, Japan
- Genres: J-pop; anison
- Occupations: Singer; lyricist; illustrator
- Instruments: Vocals
- Years active: 2022–present
- Label: Sacra Music
- Website: www.sennarin.com

SennaRin (茜雫 凛, Senna Rin; born September 23, 2001) is a Japanese singer, lyricist and illustrator, signed to Sacra Music under Sony Music Labels. Starting her singing career by covering J-pop music and anime songs, she made her debut as a solo artist on April 13, 2022, with the release of her debut EP Dignified. Two tracks from the EP, "dust" and "melt", were used as the opening and ending theme song in the anime series Legend of the Galactic Heroes: Die Neue These. SennaRin's first single, "Saihate", was featured as the ending theme song in the anime Bleach: Thousand-Year Blood War.

== Career ==
SennaRin was born in Fukuoka Prefecture, in 2001. In 2019, she started a YouTube channel and began uploading her covers of popular Japanese songs, mostly the ones featured in anime.

In early 2022, SennaRin made three pre-releases of tracks from the extended play Dignified—all of which were used in collaboration projects. The first track, "dust", was released on March 3, 2022; it was used as the opening theme song in the anime series Legend of the Galactic Heroes: Die Neue These. The second track, "BEEP", released on March 7, 2022, was used as the theme song on J Sports Rugby 2022. The third track, "melt", released on March 13, 2022, was used as the ending theme song in the anime series Legend of the Galactic Heroes: Die Neue These.

On March 13, 2022, SennaRin attended the live event "Hiroyuki Sawano LIVE [nZk]007", at Tokyo International Forum. The event had performances by her and other guest vocals, being later streamed to overseas audiences.

SennaRin's performances on YouTube caught the attention of the Japanese composer and music producer Hiroyuki Sawano, leading him to produce her debut extended play Dignified. The EP, released on April 13, 2022, charted at number 59 at Oricon.

SennaRin's first live concert, "HIGH FIVE 2022", was held on April 15, 2022, in her hometown of Fukuoka. On June 18, 2022, in Saudi Arabia, she held her first solo concert of her career. The event took place at Anime Village, in Jeddah, with her performing 16 songs. SennaRin performed at Animethon 2022, an anime convention that took place in August 2022, in Edmonton, Canada. She also attended a live concert at Shibuya WWWX on October 7.

SennaRin released her first single, "Saihate", on November 23, 2022; it was used as the ending theme song in the anime Bleach: Thousand-Year Blood War. Her second single "S9air" was released on November 29, 2023; it was used as the opening theme to the anime series Protocol: Rain. Her first studio album, ADRENA, was released on May 15, 2024. Her song "Kontinuum" was used as the ending theme to the 2025 To Be Hero X.

== Musical style and influences ==
SennaRin is defined as a "next generation pop singer", described as having an appealing, husky and soft voice. She is also referred to as a singer with a "characteristic low tone and a sense of transparency".

== Discography ==
=== Albums ===
Title	Details	Peak chart positions
Title	Details	JPN
Adrena	Released: 15 May 2024; Label: Sacra Music; Formats: CD, CD + Blu-ray, digital download, streaming	43

=== Extended plays ===
Title	Details	Peak chart positions
Title	Details	JPN
Dignified	Released: 13 April 2022; Label: Sacra Music; Formats: CD, digital download, streaming	59
Lost and Found	Released: 4 February 2026; Label: Sacra Music; Formats: CD, digital download, streaming	25

=== Singles ===
Title	Details	Peak chart positions	Album
Title	Details	JPN	Album
"Saihate"	Released: 23 November 2022; Label: Sacra Music; Formats: CD, digital download, streaming	48	Adrena
"S9aiR"	Released: 29 November 2023; Label: Sacra Music; Formats: CD, digital download, streaming	—	Adrena
"NOD"	Released: 20 January 2024; Label: Sacra Music; Formats: Digital download, streaming	—	Adrena

== Songs appearances ==
Year	Title	Appearance
2022	"dust"	Opening theme song in the anime Legend of the Galactic Heroes: Die Neue These
2022	"BEEP"	Theme song on J Sports Rugby 2022
2022	"melt"	Ending theme song in the anime Legend of the Galactic Heroes: Die Neue These
2022	"Saihate"	Ending theme song in the anime Bleach: Thousand-Year Blood War
2023	"S9aiR"	Opening theme song in the anime Protocol: Rain
2024	"NOD"	Opening theme song in the television drama Innai Keisatsu
2026	"ENDROLL"	Insert song in the film Mobile Suit Gundam Hathaway: The Sorcery of Nymph Circe

== Videography ==
=== Music videos ===
Year	Title
2022	"BEEP"
2022	"melt"
2022	"Missing Piece -WwisH-" (SennaRin x Hiroyuki Sawano)
2022	"Akashi"
2022	"Till I" (SennaRin x Hiroyuki Sawano)
2022	"Saihate"
2023	"S9aiR"
2024	"NOD"
