= But wait. Cats? =

- Digipak and digital cover. Both a gray and yellow variant exists for other versions.

Studio album by [Alexandros]
- Released: July 13, 2022
- Genres: Alternative rock, pop rock, pop punk, dream pop
- Length: 38:08
- Languages: Japanese, English
- Label: Universal J / RX-Records
- Producers: [Alexandros], Gabe Wax, Takashi Saze, Seiji Kameda

[Alexandros] chronology
Where's My History? (2021)	But wait. Cats? (2022)	This Summer Festival 2022 (Live at Tokyo International Forum Hall A 2022.4.28) (2022)

Singles from But wait. Cats?
- 1. "Senkou" Released: May 5, 2021; 2. "Rock The World" / "Hibi, Oriori" Released: February 16, 2022; 3. "Mushin Pakusu" Released: June 3, 2022; 4. "Baby's Alright" Released: July 7, 2022

But wait. Cats? is the eighth studio album by the Japanese rock band [Alexandros]. Recorded between 2021 and 2022, it was released on July 13, 2022 through Universal J and RX-Records. It was the band's first studio album since Sleepless in Brooklyn, released in November 2018, and their first studio album to feature drummer Ib Riad as an official member.

The album contains eleven tracks, including the previously released singles "Senkou" and "Rock the World" / "Hibi, Oriori". Several songs were used in films, television series and advertising campaigns, including "Senkou", the theme song for the animated film Mobile Suit Gundam: Hathaway, "Mushin Pakusu", the opening theme for the anime television series Ao Ashi, "Baby's Alright", the theme song for the drama Roppongi Class and "crush", the theme song for the film adaptation of The Violence Action.

But wait. Cats? debuted and peaked at number four on the Oricon Albums Chart, Oricon Combined Albums Chart, Billboard Japan Hot Albums, Billboard Japan Top Album Sales and Billboard Japan Download Albums charts. It also reached number one on Oricon's weekly Rock Albums chart and number three on its Digital Albums chart.

== Background ==
In March 2021, drummer Satoyasu Shomura left [Alexandros] due to issues with focal dystonia. Ib Riad, who had performed as a supporting drummer for the group, subsequently became an official member. But wait. Cats? was therefore the first [Alexandros] studio album recorded with Riad as a member.

The album was released approximately three years and eight months after the band's seventh studio album, Sleepless in Brooklyn. Although the compilation album Where's My History? had been issued in March 2021, But wait. Cats? was the band's first collection of new studio material in almost four years.

The album was recorded during 2021 and 2022. Its production involved collaborations with producers and arrangers including Gabe Wax, Takashi Saze, Seiji Kameda and Takamune Negishi.

The band announced their plans to release a new album in March 2022 while revealing that "Mushin Pakusu" would serve as the opening theme for the anime adaptation of Ao Ashi. Its title and initial release details were announced the following month. Although "Beast" had been released as a single in November 2020, it was not included on the album.

== Composition and recording ==
Most of the album's lyrics and music were written by vocalist Yoohei Kawakami. Screenwriter Eriko Kitagawa wrote the lyrics to "Sora to Ao", which Kawakami had originally composed for singer Leo Ieiri, to be used in the television drama Date My Daughter!, in which Kawakami played a regular cast member.

Several tracks were created with American producer Gabe Wax, who co-arranged and produced "Baby's Alright", "Dodemoiikara" and "Awkward". Takashi Saze contributed programming and arrangements to "Senkou", "Hibi, Oriori", "Sora to Ao" and "Rock the World".

"Mushin Pakusu" was sound-produced and arranged with bassist and producer Seiji Kameda. "crush" was arranged with bassist and producer Takamune Negishi.

The album opens with the instrumental "Aleatoric", which had previously been performed during the band's Aleatoric Arena 4 Days concerts in 2021. The title refers to aleatoric or chance-based music, in which elements of a composition are left to chance or performer choice.

== Release and promotion ==
But wait. Cats? was released on July 13, 2022 in four physical configurations: a standard CD edition, a limited CD and DVD edition, a limited CD and Blu-ray edition and a complete production-limited edition.

The DVD and Blu-ray limited editions included footage from two concerts. The first was the 12/26 Chokuzen-no-Nenmatsu Party, held at Zepp Tokyo on 18 December 2021. The second was This Summer Festival 2022, held at Tokyo International Forum Hall A on 28 April 2022. The editions also included the documentary Follow the Cats.

The complete production-limited edition contained the album, a bonus CD titled Demo Tracks and two Blu-ray discs. The demo disc contained early versions of ten of the album's eleven tracks, with "Sora to Ao" being the only standard album song not represented. The second Blu-ray included Kawakami's acoustic solo concert Yoohei Kawakami's #room665, performed at Warehouse Terrada E Hall on 24 December 2021, as well as additional documentary and behind-the-scenes material.

The band promoted the album through the nationwide But Wait. Tour?. It was followed by the arena tour But Wait. Arena? later that year. A limited vinyl edition was released on December 20, 2023 through Polydor Records. A Universal Music Store edition was bundled with a t-shirt signed by the band members.

== Songs ==
=== "Aleatoric" ===
"Aleatoric" is an instrumental introductory track. It was first performed during the band's Aleatoric Arena 4 Days concerts in 2021. The recording features keyboards by Rosé of the Led Snail and saxophone by Ami of the brass group Mos.

=== "Baby's Alright" ===
"Baby's Alright" was produced and arranged by [Alexandros] and Gabe Wax. It served as the theme song for the TV Asahi drama Roppongi Class, a Japanese adaptation of the South Korean television series Itaewon Class. A collaborative music video containing footage from the drama was released on June 29, 2022. The song was released digitally on 7 July, six days before the album, while its standard music video premiered on 13 July.

=== "Senkou" ===
"Senkou" was released as the band's nineteenth physical single on May 5, 2021. It served as the theme song for the animated film Mobile Suit Gundam: Hathaway. The recording was arranged by [Alexandros] and Takashi Saze. "Senkou" became one of the band's most commercially successful songs, being certified gold by the Recording Industry Association of Japan for streaming in July 2022 and platinum in September 2023. It received significant renewed attention through internet memes and fan-created videos connected to Mobile Suit Gundam: Hathaway.

=== "Dodemoiikara" ===
"Dodemoiikara" was produced and arranged by [Alexandros] and Gabe Wax. The song was used in YouTube Premium's 2022 summer advertising campaign. Its music video premiered on YouTube on July 28, 2022.

=== "Hibi, Oriori" ===
"Hibi, Oriori" had previously been released as the second half of the double A-side single "Rock the World" / "Hibi, Oriori" on February 26, 2022. The song was created for the "#Sentaku" Project, a joint campaign by Panasonic and Kao Corporation promoting household laundry products and appliances. Kawakami also appeared in advertising connected to the campaign.

=== "Sora to Ao" ===
"Sora to Ao" was written by screenwriter Eriko Kitagawa and composed by Kawakami. It is a self-cover of a song originally recorded by singer Leo Ieiri. Ieiri's version was released in January 2021 and served as the theme song for the television drama Date My Daughter!, which was written by Kitagawa. The [Alexandros] version was arranged by the band and Takashi Saze.

=== "Rock the World" ===
"Rock the World" was previously released as the first half of the double A-side single "Rock the World" / "Hibi, Oriori". It served as the theme song for the animated film Goodbye, Don Glees!, which was released in Japan in February 2022. The song was later used in the "Top Athlete" advertising campaign for the haircare brand Tokio Inkarami. The commercials featured athletes including Japanese snowboarder Ayumu Hirano.

=== "Mushin Pakusu" ===
"Mushin Pakusu" served as the opening theme for the first cour of the anime television series Ao Ashi. The track was sound-produced by Seiji Kameda, who also co-arranged it with [Alexandros]. Kameda is known for his work as the bassist of Tokyo Jihen and as a producer for numerous Japanese artists. An abbreviated "Aoashi Version" was released digitally on June 3, 2022. A music video created entirely in collaboration with Ao Ashi was released on the same day.

=== "we are still kids & stray cats" ===
"we are still kids & stray cats" was arranged solely by [Alexandros]. The song was later used alongside "Rock the World" in Ifing's Tokio Inkarami "Top Athlete" advertising campaign.

=== "crush" ===
"crush" was arranged by [Alexandros] and Takamune Negishi. It served as the theme song for the 2022 film The Violence Action, starring Kanna Hashimoto. The song was announced as the film's theme in June 2022. A visualizer was subsequently released to promote the album.

=== "Awkward" ===
"Awkward" is the album's closing track and was produced and arranged by [Alexandros] and Gabe Wax. Kawakami said that its unusual melody and floating sound were intended to capture an ambiguous discomfort. During recording, Wax had the band perform the song repeatedly. Through successive takes, the members removed unnecessary parts and developed a more unified groove.

== Track listing ==
All tracks are written by Yoohei Kawakami.

No.	Title	Lyrics	Arrangement	Length
1.	"Aleatoric"		[Alexandros]	1:11
2.	"Baby's Alright"		[Alexandros], Gabe Wax	2:43
3.	"Senkou"		[Alexandros], Takashi Saze	4:22
4.	"Dodemoiikara"		[Alexandros], Gabe Wax	3:05
5.	"Hibi, Oriori"		[Alexandros], Takashi Saze	3:25
6.	"Sora to Ao"	Eriko Kitagawa	[Alexandros], Takashi Saze	4:37
7.	"Rock The World"		[Alexandros], Takashi Saze	4:28
8.	"Mushin Pakusu"		[Alexandros], Seiji Kameda	3:30
9.	"we are still kids & stray cats"		[Alexandros]	3:12
10.	"crush"		[Alexandros], Takamune Negishi	3:26
11.	"Awkward"		[Alexandros], Gabe Wax	4:09
Total length:				38:08

== Personnel ==
=== [Alexandros] ===
- Yoohei Kawakami – vocals, guitar, producer, arranger
- Hiroyuki Isobe – bass, chorus, producer, arranger
- Masaki Shirai – guitar, producer, arranger
- Ib Riad – drums, producer, arranger

=== Additional personnel ===
- Gabe Wax – producer and arranger on tracks 2, 4 and 11
- Seiji Kameda – sound producer and arranger on track 8
- Takashi Saze – arranger and programming on tracks 3, 5 and 7
- Takamune Negishi – arranger and programming on track 10
- Rosé (of The Led Snail) – keyboards on tracks 1, 4–7, 9 and 11
- Ami (of Mos) – saxophone on tracks 1 and 4

== Charts ==
=== Daily charts ===
Chart	Peak position
Daily Albums (Oricon)	3

=== Weekly charts ===
Chart	Peak position
Japan Albums (Oricon)	4
Combined Albums (Oricon)	4
Rock Albums (Oricon)	1
Digital Albums (Oricon)	3
Japan Hot Albums (Billboard)	4
Japan Top Albums Sales (Billboard)	4
Japan Download Albums (Billboard)	4

== Release history ==
Regions	Date	Formats	Label	Ref.
Japan	July 13, 2022	CD, DVD, digital download	Universal J / RX-Records	
Worldwide	July 13, 2022	Digital download, streaming	Universal J / RX-Records	
Japan	December 20, 2023	LP	Polydor Records / RX-Records	
