= Sleepless in Brooklyn =

Studio album by [Alexandros]
- Released: November 21, 2018
- Studios: Lakehouse Studios (Asbury Park, New Jersey); Diamond City Studio (Brooklyn, New York); NK Sound (Tokyo); Oorong Studio (Tokyo); Studio Sunshine (Tokyo)
- Genres: Alternative rock, pop rock, pop punk, noise rock, experimental rock
- Length: 50:29
- Languages: Japanese, English
- Label: Universal J / RX-Records
- Producers: [Alexandros], Alex Aldi, Albert Di Fiore, Ayad Al Adhamy

[Alexandros] chronology
Exist! (2016)	Sleepless in Brooklyn (2018)	Bedroom Joule (2020)

Singles from Sleepless in Brooklyn
- 1. "Snow Sound" / "Imamade Kimiganaitabun Torimodosou" Released: February 21 2017; 2. "Ashita, Mata" Released: November 29, 2017; 3. "Kabuto" Released: May 23, 2018; 4. "Mosquito Bite" Released: July 18, 2018

Sleepless in Brooklyn is the seventh studio album by the Japanese rock band [Alexandros], using the stylization [ALEXANDROS]. It was released on November 21, 2018, through Universal J and RX-Records. A limited-edition double LP version followed on December 19, 2018. The album includes the previously released singles "Snow Sound", "Ashita, Mata", "Kabuto" and "Mosquito Bite".

The album was recorded in Japan and the United States, with much of its production taking place in Brooklyn, New York. It debuted at number three on both the Oricon Albums Chart and the Billboard Japan Hot Albums chart. The Recording Industry Association of Japan certified it gold for sales of 100,000 copies.

== Background and recording ==
Sleepless in Brooklyn was released around two years after the band's sixth studio album, Exist!. The members travelled between Japan and the United States while making the record, spending more than a year working on material in America. They lived together in Brooklyn during part of the recording process, marking their first extended period of communal living in approximately five or six years.

The album was the first [Alexandros] record for which the band worked extensively with outside producers and engineers. These included Alex Aldi, Albert Di Fiore, Ayad Al Adhamy, Takashi Saze and Takeshi Kobayashi.

"Last Minute" was the first song completed during the Brooklyn sessions. The band debuted it publicly at their V.I.P. Party 2018 concert at Zozo Marine Stadium on August 16, 2018.

The album contains 13 tracks, although "Snow Sound" and "Ashita, Mata" are identified as encore tracks rather than part of its main 11-song sequence. Both were remastered for inclusion on the album.

== Release and promotion ==
Sleepless in Brooklyn was released in four CD configurations: a standard edition, two limited editions and a complete production-limited edition. The complete production-limited edition was packaged in a box with an original T-shirt. It also included a DVD documenting more than a year of recording in the United States and a CD containing rare tracks and demos.

Limited edition A included the album on CD and a Blu-ray containing the band's complete VIP Party 2018 concert at Zozo Marine Stadium. Limited edition B contained the same concert film on DVD. The concert, held on August 16, 2018, was the band's first headlining stadium performance and attracted approximately 35,000 people.

Initial pressings of all four CD editions included a serial code for an advance ticket lottery for the band's 2019 arena tour and an application for a meet-and-greet lottery. A made-to-order double LP edition was released on December 19, 2018.

== Composition and songs ==
Most of the album's lyrics and music were written by vocalist Yoohei Kawakami. Poet Tahi Saihate wrote the lyrics to "Hanauta", making it the first [Alexandros] song for which Kawakami did not contribute to the lyrics. Translations of several tracks were credited to Yopeko Toda, an alias of Kawakami's.

=== "Arpeggio" ===
"Arpeggio" was written as the main theme for the Yakuza spin-off game Judgment, titled Judge Eyes: Shinigami no Yuigon in Japan. Kawakami said that its lyrics took longer to complete than those of any song he had previously written. "Arpeggio" and "Your Song" were recorded in New Jersey rather than Brooklyn. The music video was filmed in Tokyo in early October 2018 and features actor Takuya Kimura, who played Takayuki Yagami, the protagonist of Judgment. Kimura appears as a camera operator, and footage he recorded during the shoot was incorporated into the completed video.

=== "Mosquito Bite" ===
"Mosquito Bite" was released as the album's fourth physical single and served as the theme song for the 2018 live-action film Bleach. Kawakami developed the song after attending performances in Brooklyn by artists ranging from professional musicians to university bands and street performers. He said that the quality and seriousness of the musicians initially discouraged him, but also convinced him that the band needed to produce a song capable of succeeding in the city. Completing "Mosquito Bite" subsequently helped the band finish other material that was still under development.

=== "I Don't Believe in You" ===
"I Don't Believe in You" had previously appeared as a B-side on the single "Ashita, Mata". The album version removes the introduction heard on the single recording. The song was used in a television commercial for the Mini Cooper Southwark models.

=== "Hanauta" ===
"Hanauta" previously appeared as a B-side on the single "Kabuto". The instrumental used in its early demo was an early form of "Senkou". Its lyrics were written by poet Tahi Saihate, while Kawakami composed the music. The song was used in Tokyo Metro's "Find My Tokyo" advertising campaign.

=== "Party Is Over" ===
"Party Is Over" was completed after the band returned to Japan. Bassist Hiroyuki Isobe used a synth bass rather than a conventional bass guitar on the recording, the first time he had done so on an [Alexandros] song.

=== "Milk" ===
"Milk" served as an insert song in the live-action film Bleach. A separate "Bleach Version" had previously appeared as a B-side on the "Mosquito Bite" single. The album version contains a different instrumental passage.

=== "Kabuto" ===
"Kabuto" had previously been released as the title track of the band's May 2018 single.

=== "Fish Tacos Party" ===
"Fish Tacos Party" was used as the opening theme for the second Abema TV Tournament, a televised shogi competition.

=== "Your Song" ===
"Your Song" served as the ending song for Judgment. Kawakami wrote it with the game's lead actor, Takuya Kimura, in mind. The lyrics personify a song and are written from the song's perspective. Like "Arpeggio", "Your Song" was recorded in New Jersey. Kimura later recorded a cover of it for his 2020 studio album Go with the Flow.

=== Encore tracks ===
"Snow Sound" was originally released as part of the double A-side single "Snow Sound / Imamade Kimiganaitabun Torimodosou" in February 2017. Unlike the single recording, the album version does not fade out. "Ashita, Mata" was released as a single in November 2017. Both songs were designated encore tracks because the band considered them inconsistent with the main album's concept.

== Track listing ==
All tracks are written by Yoohei Kawakami.

No.	Title	Lyrics	Arrangement	Length
1.	"Last Minute"		[Alexandros], Alex Aldi, Albert Di Fiore, Takashi Saze	4:38
2.	"Arpeggio"		[Alexandros], Alex Aldi, Albert Di Fiore	3:53
3.	"Mosquito Bite"		[Alexandros], Ayad Al Adhamy	4:06
4.	"I Don't Believe In You"		[Alexandros], Takashi Saze	3:22
5.	"Hanauta (feat. Tahi Saihate)"	Tahi Saihate	[Alexandros], Takeshi Kobayashi	4:31
6.	"Party Is Over"		[Alexandros], Takashi Saze	4:07
7.	"Milk"		[Alexandros], Takashi Saze	2:12
8.	"Spit!"		[Alexandros], Alex Aldi, Albert Di Fiore	2:19
9.	"Kabuto"		[Alexandros], Takashi Saze	3:22
10.	"Fish Tacos Party"		[Alexandros]	3:38
11.	"Your Song"		[Alexandros], Alex Aldi, Albert Di Fiore	4:42
12.	"Snow Sound"		[Alexandros]	5:16
13.	"Ashita, Mata"		[Alexandros], Takashi Saze	4:42
Total length:				50:48

== Limited edition Blu-ray/DVD ==
The Blu-ray included with limited edition A and the DVD included with limited edition B contain V.I.P. Party 2018 at Zozo Marine Stadium:

1. “Wataridori”
2. “For Freedom"
3. “City”
4. “Cat 2”
5. “Waitress, Waitress!”
6. “Spy”
7. “Forever Young”
8. “Starrrrrrr”
9. “Droshky!”
10. “Run Away”
11. “Girl A”
12. “Moon Song”
13. “Oblivion”
14. “This Is Teenage"
15. “Wanna Get Out”
16. “Famous Day”
17. “Kill Me If You Can”
18. “Waterdrop”
19. “Thunder”
20. “Travel”
21. “Leaving Grapefruits”
22. “Last Minute”
23. “Ashita, Mata”
24. “I Don't Believe in You”
25. “Mosquito Bite”
26. “Hanauta”
27. “Adventure”
28. “Kick & Spin”

== Personnel ==
Credits are retrieved from the album's liner notes, which are written in English.

=== [Alexandros] (as [ALEXANDROS]) ===
- Yoohei Kawakami – vocals, guitar, producer, arranger
- Hiroyuki Isobe – bass, chorus, producer, arranger
- Masaki Shirai – guitar, producer, arranger
- Satoyasu Shomura – drums, producer, arranger

=== Additional personnel ===
- Rosé (of The Led Snail) – keyboards
- Alex Aldi – producer and arranger on tracks 1, 2, 8 and 11; recording engineer on tracks 1, 2, 8 and 11 (Lakehouse Studios, Asbury Park, New Jersey); mixing engineer on tracks 1–4, 6–8 and 10–13 (The Glassfactory, Brooklyn, New York)
- Albert Di Fiore – producer, arranger and recording engineer on tracks 1, 2, 8 and 11 (Lakehouse Studios, Asbury Park, New Jersey)
- Ayad Al Adhamy – producer on tracks 3 and 7; synthesizer programming on tracks 3 and 7; recording on tracks 3 and 7 (Diamond City Studio, Brooklyn, New York); arranger on track 3
- Joe Wittenberg – recording on tracks 3 and 7 (Diamond City Studio, Brooklyn, New York)
- Takashi Saze – programming on tracks 1, 2, 4, 6 and 8–11 and 13; synthesizer programming on tracks 3 and 7; arranger on tracks 4,6,7,9 and 13
- Takeshi Kobayashi – keyboards and arranger on track 5
- Udai Shika Strings – strings on track 5
- Ren Adachi (Oorong-Sha) – programming on track 5
- Kei Kusama (Kurid) – programming on track 12
- Jennifer – chorus on track 13
- Eliana – chorus on track 13
- Etsuhiro "E.T" Nakamura – recording engineer on tracks 4, 6, 9, 10, 12 and 13
- Neeraj Khajanchi (NK Sound, Tokyo) – vocal recording engineer on tracks 1, 4, 8 and 13; vocal recording and mixing engineer on track 9; mixing engineer on track 5
- Makoto Yoshida (Oorong-Sha) – recording engineer on track 5
- Hiromu Yasumoto (Studio Sunshine) – vocal recording engineer on track 10
- Joe LaPorta – mastering engineer (Sterling Sound)
- Nahoko Matsubayashi (Universal J) – project leader
- Kenjiro Tsutsumi (Universal J) – A&R
- Shoko Ando (Universal J) – artist promotion
- Norie Oki (Universal J) – international promotion
- Yasutaka Meguro (Universal Music) – sales promotion
- Michiyo Goda (Universal Music) – product coordination
- Sakaiwai (Kaiwai Works) – art direction, design
- Chad Moore – photography
- Mika Shimoda – hair and makeup
- Ikki Chida (UKPM / RX-Records) – artist manager, executive producer
- Kunitaka Ito (UKPM) – artist manager
- Taku Nakamura (Universal J) – executive producer

=== Acknowledgements ===
- Hideaki Iwashita (Livemasters Inc.)
- Nao Nakamura (Livemasters Inc.)
- Somei Rikitake (Greens Corporation)
- Akiko Toda (Greens Corporation)
- Kotaro Mase (Sunday Folk Promotion)
- Akio Igarashi (Smash East)
- Saori Taketani (Yumebanchi)
- Yushi Mori (BEA)
- Akihiro Misumi (BEA)
- Yasunobu Edo (Duke)
- Wataru Sasaki (GIP)
- Noriko Shimizu (FOB)
- Miyuki Yang (Creativeman Productions)
- Khan Rukhsana (Puffin Entertainment Ltd.)
- Stephanie Pun (Puffin Entertainment Ltd.)
- Chang Eul Lee (Master Plan Music Group)
- Kat Chen (Taiwan Indie Music Association)
- Fun Chen (Bureau of Cultural Affairs, Kaohsiung City Government)
- Ginny Tsai (Bureau of Cultural Affairs, Kaohsiung City Government)
- Kazuyoshi Hasegawa (Moridaira)
- Masanori Watanabe (Yamaha Music Japan Co., Ltd.)
- Mitsuaki Odanaka (Hoshino Gakki Co., Ltd.)
- Tomokaz Kawamura (LEP International Co., Ltd.)
- Yukihiro Hayashi (Free The Tone, Ltd.)
- Kazumori Iida (Boss Corporation)
- Dennis Martin
- Rui Takanashi
- Benny Rubin
- The band's families, friends and fans

== Charts ==
Chart	Peak position
Japanese Albums (Oricon)	3
Japan Hot Albums (Billboard)	3
Japan Top Albums (Billboard)	3
Japan Download Albums (Billboard)	5
Taiwan East Asian Chart (G-Music)	1

== Certifications ==
Region	Certification	Certified units/sales
Japan (RIAJ)	Gold	100,000^{^}

== Release history ==
Regions	Date	Formats	Label	Ref.
Japan	November 21, 2018	CD, DVD, digital download	Universal J / RX-Records	
Worldwide	November 21, 2018	Digital download, streaming	Universal J / RX-Records	
Taiwan	November 23, 2018	CD, DVD	Universal Taiwan	
Japan	December 19, 2018	Double LP	Universal J / RX-Records	
United Kingdom, European Union	January 2019	CD, DVD	Wrasse Records	
