= Audiotree =

American music record label

- Founded: 2011
- Founder: Michael Johnston, Adam Thurston
- Country of origin: United States
- Location: Chicago, Illinois,
- Official website: audiotree.tv

Audiotree is an American music record label located in Chicago, founded in 2011. The company records and publishes live music sessions. It also promotes artists and organizes live events, and invites artists from around the world to enter a professional studio setting, to record, perform, and release a live EP free of cost.

== History ==
Audiotree was founded in 2011 in Chicago by Michael Johnston and Adam Thurston, who saw the potential for a viable business recording live sessions for artist and sharing the revenue from sales. Michael Johnston was already working as an audio engineer in the Chicago area, and founded the company to help promote independent artists and bands. Johnston was removed from his post as president and CEO of Audiotree following his arrest for felony unauthorized videotaping in November of 2021.

In 2018 Audiotree announced its extension into Canada, collaborating with Paquin Entertainment Agency to create a Canadian artist discovery platform.

== Live events ==
The company's series known as Audiotree Live is broadcast from the studio directly to YouTube and the Audiotree website for fans to listen live. Audiotree company serves as one of the top music video outlets, having amassed over 700 thousand subscribers and 280 million video views on their YouTube channel as of 2022.

Audiotree has held its annual Audiotree Music Festival since 2012. The festival is typically held in September, and takes place at the Arcadia Creek Festival Place in Kalamazoo, Michigan. The festival was held every year until 2019, when Audiotree shifted their focus to hosting special concerts at their independently owned venues at Lincoln Hall and Schubas Tavern in Chicago.

At the end of 2020, during the COVID-19 pandemic, Audiotree began organizing live virtual concerts under a new segment called "Staged". This segment allowed fans to pay a small fee to join a private broadcast of the show, which they could stream as much as they want for 24 hours after completion. Time Out Chicago noted that due to Audiotree's extensive prior experience with producing streaming media, the label was "uniquely equipped" to help bands keep performing online during the pandemic.

== Business model ==
Audiotree typically shares revenue from sales of live session recordings with the artist, usually split 50:50. The company works mainly with musicians that are independent or on independent music labels. In 2020, the COVID-19 pandemic's limitations on public gatherings created problems for music venues, leading Audiotree to release merchandise online to help afford maintenance and other venue fees.

== Recording process ==
In 2015–2016, Audiotree released a series of videos showing behind the scenes of how they record music and prepare video and lighting. The studio holds a wide variety of microphones, ranging from the AKG 460 or the Royer 122 for acoustic guitar recordings, to a Telefunken M-82 used on the bass drum. The company does on-the-spot sound mastering using iZotope Ozone 9, and partnered with Antelope Audio for analog audio equipment in their control room.

In 2017 Audiotree started a new series named Far Out sessions, taking their work outside of the studio and recording live music sessions away from traditional music venues.

== Selected roster ==
A complete roster is available on the Audiotree website; the dates of the selected sessions below are from the metadata of the relevant session pages.

- Passafire (January 29, 2012)
- Caspian (September 12, 2012 & February 5, 2016)
- Geographer (January 21, 2013 & October 16, 2015)
- K.Flay (February 21, 2013 & July 24, 2015)
- Shakey Graves (June 20, 2013)
- The World Is a Beautiful Place & I Am No Longer Afraid to Die (March 1, 2014)
- Nathaniel Rateliff (May 1, 2014)
- Maybe April (July 22, 2014)
- Foxing (July 24, 2014)
- Glass Animals (September 10, 2014)
- Artifex Pereo (January 15, 2015)
- Rayland Baxter (February 22, 2015)
- The Suffers (April 7, 2015)
- Guster (April 13, 2015)
- Genevieve (April 28, 2015)
- The Main Squeeze (June 9, 2015)
- Mitski (June 20, 2015)
- Turnover (August 11, 2015)
- Mothers (September 23, 2015)
- Amasa Hines (October 3, 2015)
- Hemming (October 6, 2015)
- Emily King (October 28, 2015)
- Jill Andrews (November 9, 2015)
- The Bottle Rockets (November 23, 2015)
- Jared & The Mill (December 4, 2015)
- Charly Bliss (January 15, 2016)
- Julien Baker (January 16, 2016)
- Low Cut Connie (February 22, 2016)
- The Wild Reeds (February 25, 2016)
- Raging Fyah (March 19, 2016)
- Escondido (March 24, 2016)
- Lucy Dacus (March 28, 2016)
- Covet (March 30, 2016)
- The Yawpers (April 5, 2016)
- Pinegrove (April 30, 2016)
- Lydia Loveless (July 8, 2016)
- Liz Cooper & The Stampede (October 10, 2016)
- Rainbow Kitten Surprise (January 26, 2017)
- Crying (March 2, 2017)
- Slothrust (March 10, 2017)
- Sinai Vessel (April 6, 2017 & April 21, 2021)
- Snail Mail (June 2, 2017)
- Forth Wanderers (June 8, 2017)
- Andrea von Kampen (June 9, 2017)
- Ratboys (June 30, 2017)
- Michigander (July 12, 2017)
- Pet Symmetry (July 17, 2017)
- Camp Cope (July 21, 2017)
- Nicole Atkins (August 9, 2017)
- Larkin Poe (August 28, 2017)
- Strange Ranger (September 7, 2017)
- Soccer Mommy (September 14, 2017)
- Wild Pink (September 29, 2017)
- Peach Pit (October 17, 2017)
- Cuco (January 17, 2018)
- Samantha Fish (January 29, 2018)
- Black Joe Lewis & the Honeybears (October 4, 2018)
- Beach Bunny (November 20, 2018)
- The Accidentals (January 3, 2019)
- Emily Blue (January 10, 2019)
- Laura Stevenson (May 30, 2019)
- Vansire (August 8, 2019)
- We Are The Union (September 18, 2019)
- Yours Truly (October 8, 2019)
- Mega Bog (October 10, 2019)
- Phum Viphurit (October 15, 2019)
- Tasha (January 9, 2020)
- Marco Benevento (November 8, 2019)
- Heart Attack Man (January 14, 2020)
- Kneebody (February 10, 2020)
- Reuben and the Dark (March 9, 2020)
- Stonefield (March 18, 2020)
- Tenci (September 29, 2020)
- Charmer (December 7, 2020)
- Momma (band) (April 1, 2022)
- Jordana (May 8, 2025)

== See also ==
- List of record labels
