= Wataridori =

Single by [Alexandros]

from the album ALXD
- Language: Japanese
- A-side: "Dracula La" (double A-side)
- B-side: "Adam's Apple Pie"
- Released: March 18, 2015
- Genre: J-pop
- Label: Universal J / RX-Records
- Songwriter: Yoohei Kawakami
- Producer: [Alexandros]

[Alexandros] singles chronology
"Adventure" / "Droshky!" (2014)	"Wataridori" / "Dracula La" (2015)	"Girl A" (2015)

Alternative cover

"Wataridori" (ワタリドリ) is a song by the Japanese rock band [Alexandros]. It was released on March 18, 2015, as part of the double A-side single "Wataridori" / "Dracula La". The release was the band's tenth single and their first major-label single under their partnership with Universal Music Japan. "Wataridori" was later included as the opening track of the band's fifth studio album, ALXD.

Written and composed by vocalist Yoohei Kawakami and arranged by [Alexandros], the song served as the theme for the 2015 film Akegarasu. It peaked at number three on the Billboard Japan Hot 100, while the physical double A-side single reached number five on the Oricon Singles Chart.

== Background and release ==
[Alexandros] announced "Wataridori" / "Dracula La" in January 2015. "Wataridori" had already been performed at the band's concerts from late 2014, while "Dracula La" had been selected as the theme song for the MBS and TBS television drama Take Me To Love & Meal. The two songs were subsequently issued together as a double A-side single.

The single was the band's first release through their partnership with Universal Music Japan. It was released under the Universal J and RX-Records labels and was made available in three physical versions: limited edition A, limited edition B and a standard edition.

Limited edition A was titled "Wataridori" / "Dracula La" and placed "Wataridori" first. It also contained the common B-side "Adam's Apple Pie" and a live recording of "You're So Sweet & I Love You" from This Summer Festival on December 20, 2014. Its accompanying DVD included the "Wataridori" music video and making-of footage. Limited edition B was titled "Dracula La" / "Wataridori" and reversed the order of the two A-sides. It contained "Adam's Apple Pie", a live recording of "Adventure" from the same concert, and a DVD featuring the "Dracula La" video and making-of footage.

The standard edition contained "Wataridori", "Dracula La" and "Adam's Apple Pie". The complete single was also released digitally through the iTunes Store in 251 countries and territories from March 18, 2015, and through RecoChoku in Japan.

== Composition and lyrics ==
"Wataridori" was written and composed by Yoohei Kawakami and arranged and produced by [Alexandros]. The title is the Japanese word for a migratory bird. The lyrics alternate between Japanese and English. Kawakami later associated the song with leaving Japan and pursuing opportunities overseas. It runs for approximately four minutes and thirteen seconds.

== Media use ==
"Wataridori" served as the theme song for the 2015 comedy film Akegarasu. It was the band's first song to be used as the theme for a feature film. The official single page identifies both the film association and the song's placement as the first track of the release. The song was also used as the March 2015 ending theme for the Fuji Television music programme Sakigake! Ongaku Banzuke Eight.

It was later featured in several advertising and promotional campaigns, including a commercial for Asahi the Dream and a 2018 commercial for the Subaru XV. The song was also offered as an on-ride music selection for the Hollywood Dream – The Ride attraction at Universal Studios Japan.

== Music video ==
The full music videos for "Wataridori" and "Dracula La" were published on YouTube on March 18, 2015, coinciding with the single's release. The "Wataridori" video was included on the DVD accompanying limited edition A, while the "Dracula La" video appeared with limited edition B.

The "Wataridori" video features Kaya Kiyohara and Raimu Taya. It was filmed at locations in Takahagi, Ibaraki Prefecture, including Ibaraki Prefectural Hitachi Kita High School.

On August 7, 2019, the video surpassed 100 million views on YouTube. It was the first [Alexandros] music video to reach the milestone and the twenty-first music video by a Japanese artist to do so.

== Commercial performance ==
The physical "Wataridori" / "Dracula La" single debuted and peaked at number five on the Oricon Singles Chart. It remained ranked for eight weeks and became the band's first physical single to enter the top five.

As an individual song, "Wataridori" peaked at number three on the Billboard Japan Hot 100 in the chart published on March 25, 2015. It placed at number 62 on Billboard Japan's year-end Hot 100 for 2015 and returned to later year-end rankings as its digital and streaming popularity continued. The Recording Industry Association of Japan later certified the song double platinum for digital downloads and platinum for streaming. In October 2026, "Wataridori" was certified triple platinum for streaming.

== Sagami-Ōno Station melody ==
On September 2, 2024, arrangements of "Wataridori" began being used as train-approach melodies at Sagami-Ōno Station on the Odakyū Odawara Line. Different portions of the song are used on the station's inbound and outbound platforms.

The project originated at a January 2023 concert at Sagamihara Women's University Green Hall, where the band performed an improvised train-melody version of "Wataridori". The performance prompted requests from fans and local residents for the song to be formally adopted at the station.

Sagamihara City, Odakyu Electric Railway, UKPM and Universal Music subsequently entered into an agreement to introduce the melodies. Their adoption formed part of events commemorating the seventieth anniversary of Sagamihara's establishment as a city. It was the first new train-approach melody introduced on the Odakyū Line in approximately five years.

A full-length arrangement titled "Wataridori (Ekimero Full Version)" was later included as the fourth track on the band's CD single, "SINGLE 2", released on September 18, 2024. A shorter station-melody version was also supplied through a sound keychain packaged with one of the single's limited editions.

== Track listings ==
=== Standard edition ===
==== CD ====
1. "Wataridori"
2. "Dracula La"
3. "Adam's Apple Pie"

=== Limited edition A ===
==== CD ====
1. "Wataridori"
2. "Dracula La"
3. "Adam's Apple Pie"
4. "You're So Sweet & I Love You" (Live at This Summer Festival, December 20, 2014)

==== DVD ====
1. "Wataridori" music video
2. Making of the "Wataridori" music video

=== Limited edition B ===
==== CD ====
1. "Dracula La"
2. "Wataridori"
3. "Adam's Apple Pie"
4. "Adventure" (Live at This Summer Festival, December 20, 2014)

==== DVD ====
1. "Dracula La" music video
2. Making of the "Dracula La" music video

== Personnel ==
=== [Alexandros] ===
- Yoohei Kawakami – vocals, guitar, producer
- Hiroyuki Isobe – bass, chorus, producer
- Masaki Shirai – guitar, producer
- Satoyasu Shomura – drums, producer

=== Additional personnel ===
- Rose (of The Led Snail) – keyboards

== Charts ==
=== Weekly charts ===
- Oricon Singles Chart – number 5
- Billboard Japan Hot 100 – number 3

=== Year-end charts ===
- Billboard Japan Hot 100, 2015 – number 62
- Billboard Japan Hot 100, 2016 – number 56
- Billboard Japan Hot 100, 2019 – number 42
- Billboard Japan Hot 100, 2020 – number 70

== Certifications ==
Region	Certification	Certified units/sales
Japan (RIAJ)	2× Platinum	500,000^{*}
Streaming
Japan (RIAJ)	3× Platinum	300,000,000^{†}
^{*} Sales figures based on certification alone.^{†} Streaming-only figures based on certification alone.

== Release history ==
Region	Date	Formats	Label	Ref.
Japan	March 18, 2015	CD, DVD, digital download	Universal J / RX-Records	
Worldwide	March 18, 2015	Digital download, streaming	Universal J / RX-Records	
