= ALXD =

Studio album by [Alexandros]
- Released: June 17, 2015
- Genres: Alternative rock, J-pop, pop rock, pop punk
- Length: 53:37
- Languages: Japanese, English
- Label: Universal J / RX-Records
- Producer: [Alexandros]

[Alexandros] chronology
Me No Do Karate. (2013)	ALXD (2015)	Exist! (2016)

Singles from ALXD
- 1. "Run Away" / "Oblivion" Released: December 25, 2013; 2. "Adventure" / "Droshky!" Released: June 18, 2014; 3. "Wataridori" / "Dracula La" Released: March 18, 2015

ALXD is the fifth studio album by the Japanese rock band [Alexandros]. It was released on June 17, 2015 through Universal J and RX-Records. It was the band's first studio album following their name change from [Champagne] to [Alexandros], although they continued the existing album numbering. The album contains fourteen tracks and reached number three on the Oricon Albums Chart, and it continued to stay on the chart for 83 weeks.

The record includes the previously released double A-side singles "Run Away" / "Oblivion", "Adventure" / "Droshky!" and "Wataridori" / "Dracula La". It was released approximately two years after the band's previous studio album, Me No Do Karate..

== Background and release ==
[Alexandros] announced ALXD in April 2015. The band described it as their fifth full-length album and confirmed that it would contain fourteen songs, including material issued both before and after their name change.

The album was released in standard and limited CD editions on June 17, 2015. The limited edition included a DVD featuring seven performances from This Summer Festival 2014, held at Zepp Tokyo on December 20, 2014, together with audio commentary and a filmed discussion containing the band's self-written liner notes. The standard edition carried the catalog number UPCH-2036, while the limited edition was issued as UPCH-7021.

A double LP edition, catalog number UPJH-9012/3, was released on July 15, 2015, as a made-to-order product.

ALXD was the band's first original album after changing its name from [Champagne] in March 2014. It was also their first album following the beginning of its major-label partnership with Universal Music Group, which had issued "Wataridori" / "Dracula La" in March 2015.

== Promotion ==
"Famous Day" was released digitally in advance of the album through iTunes and RecoChoku on May 20, 2015. A short version of its music video was published on the same day. Music videos were also released for "Wataridori", "Oblivion", "Droshky!", "Adventure", "Dracula La" and "Dog 3".

To mark the album's release, the band performed a free concert titled Back in Yoyogi Park! at the outdoor stage in Yoyogi Park on June 17, 2015. The venue had particular significance because the band had performed street concerts there during their amateur period. Approximately 10,000 people attended the event.

The album was followed by the 2015 and 2016 Gochisou ni Aritsukasete Itadakimasu Tour. Ticket applications for the tour were included with the limited edition of the album.

== Music and lyrics ==
ALXD is a rock album marked by an increased emphasis on arrangement and sonic design. Its instrumentation expands beyond the band's core guitar-rock setup through programming, keyboards, strings and brass.

All lyrics and music were written by Yoohei Kawakami, and all tracks were arranged by [Alexandros]. English lyric translations for selected tracks were credited to Yopeko Toda, which is an alias of Kawakami's.

== Songs ==
=== "Wataridori" ===
"Wataridori" had previously been released as the first track of the double A-side single "Wataridori" / "Dracula La" on March 18, 2015. It served as the theme song for the film Akegarasu and was performed as the March 2015 ending theme for Fuji Television's Sakigake! Ongaku Banzuke Eight.

=== "One Tempo Okureta Monster Ain't Dead" ===
The song's working title was reportedly "One Tempo Okureta Monster Is Dead". Its final title developed from a phrase repeated in the chorus, while the "one-tempo-late monster" was said to represent the band itself.

=== "Famous Day" ===
"Famous Day" was promoted as an advance digital track and with a music video. The song was initially considered being omitted from the album, but drummer Satoyasu Shomura encouraged the other members to retain it. Its originally announced title was "Greatest Night", before Kawakami proposed "Famous Day" during mastering.

=== "Adventure" ===
"Adventure" had previously appeared as the first track of the band's ninth single, "Adventure" / "Droshky!". It was used in a national television commercial for Sky PerfecTV!'s campaign highlighting Japanese people active internationally.

=== "Buzz Off (Interlude)" ===
"Buzz Off (Interlude)" is a short demo-quality track. A completed version, titled "Buzz Off!", later appeared on the band's sixth studio album, EXIST!. Before "Famous Day" was completed, "Buzz Off" was reportedly considered a possible lead track.

=== "Oblivion" ===
"Oblivion" had previously been released as the second track of the double A-side single "Run Away" / "Oblivion". It was reworked from one of the band's demo tracks from 2007, titled "Tobu Jikan". The album version has an extended ending that connects directly with "Leaving Grapefruits". The song was used as the theme for Lithium Homme's 2013 autumn-and-winter collection.

=== "Leaving Grapefruits" ===
Kawakami described "Leaving Grapefruits" as a breakup song. He later said that he regretted not simply titling it "Grapefruit". The song subsequently became a popular choice in fan voting associated with the band's V.I.P. Party concerts. The song was later used in the Fuji Television drama She.

=== "Dracula La" ===
"Dracula La" had previously been released as the second track of "Wataridori" / "Dracula La". It served as the theme song for the MBS and TBS television drama Take Me To Love & Meal.

=== "Droshky!" ===
"Droshky!" was the second track of the double A-side single "Adventure" / "Droshky!". It was used in a regional Hokkaido commercial for Sky PerfecTV! featuring footballer Shinji Ono joining Consadole Sapporo.

=== "Dog 3" ===
"Dog 3" is a sequel to "Cat 2", a song from the band's second album, I Wanna Go To Hawaii.. Its comedic music video depicts Shomura growing to gigantic proportions.

=== "Run Away" ===
"Run Away" had previously appeared as the first track of "Run Away" / "Oblivion". The album version extends the piano outro that faded out on the single and connects it directly with "Coming Summer". The song was used in a promotional campaign for the Nike+ FuelBand SE.

=== "Coming Summer" ===
"Coming Summer" existed for several years before on the band's demo album Uee, before being reworked for ALXD. Its outro incorporates a motif from the introduction of "Wataridori", creating a circular structure that links the end of the album back to its opening.

== Track listing ==
All tracks are written by Yoohei Kawakami.

No.	Title	Length
1.	"Wataridori"	4:09
2.	"Boo!"	4:33
3.	"One Tempo Okureta Monster Ain't Dead"	3:19
4.	"Famous Day"	3:17
5.	"Adventure"	4:31
6.	"Can't Explain"	3:01
7.	"Buzz Off (Interlude)"	1:13
8.	"Oblivion"	3:38
9.	"Leaving Grapefruits"	4:38
10.	"Dracula La"	3:34
11.	"Droshky!"	4:03
12.	"Dog 3"	4:01
13.	"Run Away"	4:30
14.	"Coming Summer"	5:58
Total length:		53:57

== Limited edition DVD ==
The limited edition contains seven live performances recorded at This Summer Festival at Zepp Tokyo on December 20, 2014, with optional audio commentary. It also includes a filmed self-liner-notes discussion about ALXD. The combined runtime is approximately 71 minutes.

=== This Summer Festival 2014 at Zepp Tokyo ===
1. "Burger Queen"
2. "Droshky!"
3. "city"
4. "spy"
5. "Stimulator"
6. "Run Away
7. "Don't Fuck With Yoohei Kawakami"

== Personnel ==
=== [Alexandros] ===
- Yoohei Kawakami – vocals, guitar, producer
- Hiroyuki Isobe – bass, chorus, producer
- Masaki Shirai – guitar, backing vocals, producer
- Satoyasu Shomura – drums, producer

=== Additional personnel ===
- Rose (of The Led Snail) – keyboards
- Cettia – chorus
- Yasuko Murata – strings
- Yoshiaki Kayano – trumpet
- Kenya “Kotetsu” Shirahito – trombone
- Kei Kusama – programming

== Charts ==
=== Weekly charts ===
Chart	Peak position
Japanese Albums (Oricon)	3
Japan Hot Albums (Billboard)	2

=== Year-end charts ===
Chart	Position
Japanese Albums (Oricon)	67

== Certifications ==
Region	Certification	Certified units/sales
Japan (RIAJ)	Gold	100,000^{^}

== Release history ==
Region	Date	Formats	Label	Ref.
Japan	June 17, 2015	CD, DVD, digital download	Universal J / RX-Records	
Worldwide	June 17, 2015	Digital download, streaming	Universal J / RX-Records	
Japan	July 15, 2015	Double LP	Universal J / RX-Records	
European Union	September 5, 2015	CD	Wrasse Records	
