= Where's My Potato? =

Studio album by [Alexandros]
- Released: January 20, 2010
- Genres: Alternative rock, indie rock
- Length: 44:44
- Languages: English, Japanese
- Label: RX-Records
- Producer: [Alexandros] (as [Champagne])

[Alexandros] chronology
Provocation To Noble Artists (2009)	Where's My Potato? (2010)	I Wanna Go to Hawaii. (2011)

Where's My Potato? is the debut studio album by the Japanese rock band [Alexandros], released under their former name, [Champagne]. It was released in Japan on January 20, 2010 through RX-Records, with the catalog number RX-034.

It reached number 119 on the Oricon Albums Chart. The band's official discography page identifies it as the band's first album and lists all eleven tracks, while contemporary coverage described it as the group's independent debut release.

== Background ==
In 2007, [Champagne] were signed to RX-Records. At the time of the album's release, the members were living together while pursuing the band full-time. Contemporary reporting presented Where's My Potato? as a record combining the energy and freshness of a debut with the band's distinctive sense of humour.

The band was still relatively unknown when the album was issued. Their profile subsequently grew through online attention, word of mouth and live performances. The final concert of the album's supporting tour reportedly sold out immediately, and the band went on to make its first appearances at several concerts and Japanese rock festivals during 2010.

Drummer Hiroki Ishikawa left [Champagne] on March 1, 2010, while they were touring in support of the record. As a result, Where's My Potato? was the only studio album released by the band during his tenure.

The album's lyrics frequently draw from songwriter and vocalist Yoohei Kawakami's own experiences.

== Music and lyrics ==
Where’s My Potato? is a rock album that combines elements of British rock, melodic punk and alternative rock. Contemporary descriptions highlighted Yoohei Kawakami's use of both English and Japanese lyrics, the band's prominent guitar riffs and the rapidly shifting musical developments within individual songs. HMV Japan described the group’s sound as a hybrid of melodic music, punk and British rock, while later coverage also noted its mixture of UK-rock melodies and alternative-punk elements.

All songs were written and composed by Yoohei Kawakami. The arrangements and production were handled by [Champagne]. Tower Records' album listing credits Kawakami as lyricist and composer and [Champagne] as arranger on every track.

== Songs ==
=== "Burger Queen" ===
"Burger Queen" is an instrumental composition that opens the album. It subsequently became a regular entrance theme and opening number at the band's concerts.

=== "For Freedom" ===
"For Freedom" served as the album's principal promotional track. Kawakami based the musical atmosphere of the song on Braveheart, one of his favourite films.

A full-length music video was released through UK Project's official YouTube channel ahead of the album. Contemporary coverage highlighted the song's brisk and refreshing sound and identified it as one of the album's central tracks. The video also established a recurring feature of [Champagne]'s early promotional clips: bonus or comedic footage appearing after the main video. Kawakami later recalled that he had not expected the practice to continue in the band's subsequent videos.

=== "Don't Fuck With Yoohei Kawakami" ===
"Don't Fuck With Yoohei Kawakami" was written and recorded at short notice. The band had originally planned to include "Rocknrolla!" on the album but abandoned that version after deciding that its groove did not suit the album. A replacement song was then created and included as the ninth track.

== Release and promotion ==
RX-Records released Where's My Potato? in Japan on January 20, 2010. Its original CD edition carried the catalogue number RX-034. The album was promoted with the music video for "For Freedom" and an accompanying release tour. Although issued by RX-Records, current digital editions identify UK Project as the recording copyright holder and record label. The record contains eleven songs, including "Burger Queen", "Untitled", "Wet Paint", "de Mexico" and the Japanese-language closing track "Kaerimichi". Its total duration is 44:44.

== Track listing ==
All songs arranged and produced by [Alexandros] (as [Champagne]).

All tracks are written by Yoohei Kawakami.

No.	Title	Length
1.	"Burger Queen"	2:12
2.	"She's Very"	4:56
3.	"For Freedom"	3:48
4.	"Untitled"	5:23
5.	"I Don't Know (Who You Are)"	4:12
6.	"Yeah Yeah Yeah"	3:08
7.	"Da La La La"	4:19
8.	"Wet Paint"	3:40
9.	"Don't Fuck With Yoohei Kawakami"	4:07
10.	"de Mexico"	4:58
11.	"Kaerimichi"	3:57
Total length:		44:44

== Personnel ==
Credits are retrieved from the album's liner notes, which are written in English.

=== [Alexandros] (as [Champagne]) ===
- Yoohei Kawakami – vocals, guitar, producer
- Hiroyuki Isobe – bass, chorus, producer
- Masaki Shirai – guitar, producer
- Hiroki Ishikawa – drums, producer

=== Additional personnel ===
- Ikki Chida – label producer for RX-Records
- Keiji Kondo – recording engineer, mixing
- Hiromichi "Tucky" Taniguchi – mastering (Parasight Mastering, Tokyo)
- Ryo Mukai – drum technician
- Hitoshi "Orochi Sano Chioro" Sato – RX-Records crew
- Eri Ichikawa – RX-Records crew
- UK Project – sales promotion, artist promotion
- Yuki Kawamoto – photography
- Sakaiwai – art design (Flashic Kitchen)
- Lance Henderstein – cover model

=== Acknowledgements ===
The album's liner notes include special thanks to:

- The members' families and friends
- Shougho Hamamoto
- Hatchi
- Yachiyo Katsuyama
- Tohru Karube
- The band's fans

== Charts ==
Chart	Peak position
Japanese Albums (Oricon)	119

== Release history ==
Region	Date	Formats	Label	Ref.
Japan	January 20, 2010	CD, digital download	RX-Records	
Worldwide	April 1, 2013	Digital download, streaming	UK Project / RX-Records	
