= Me No Do Karate. =

Studio album by [Alexandros]
- Released: June 26, 2013
- Genres: Alternative rock, indie rock, melodic punk
- Length: 47:09
- Languages: English, Japanese
- Label: RX-Records
- Producer: [Alexandros] (as [Champagne])

[Alexandros] chronology
Schwarzenegger (2012)	Me No Do Karate. (2013)	ALXD (2015)

Singles from Me No Do Karate.
- 1. "Starrrrrrr" / "Namidaga Koboresou" Released: January 23, 2013; 2. "Forever Young" Released: April 3, 2013

Me No Do Karate. is the fourth studio album by the Japanese rock band [Alexandros], and the final album to be released under their former name, [Champagne]. It was released in Japan on June 26, 2013 through RX-Records and distributed by UK Project. The album contains eleven tracks, including the singles "Starrrrrrr", "Namidaga Koboresou" and "Forever Young", and reached number 13 on the Oricon Albums Chart.

The album followed Schwarzenegger, released approximately one year and three months earlier. It was issued in standard and limited editions; the limited edition included a 28-page photobook and a three-sided slipcase.

== Background and release ==
[Champagne] announced Me No Do Karate. in May 2013. Music Natalie described it as the band's fourth full-length album and confirmed that it would include eleven songs, among them the previously released "Starrrrrrr", "Namidaga Koboresou" and "Forever Young". The limited edition was issued under catalogue number RX-075, while the standard edition used RX-076.

The band did not begin production with a fixed concept for the album. According to later interviews, the songs developed individually from ideas that arose during the writing and recording process.

The album title originated from songwriter and vocalist Yoohei Kawakami's adolescence in Syria. He reportedly used the phrase "Me no do karate" when responding to local people who repeatedly associated him with judo or karate because he was Japanese.

== Music and lyrics ==
Me No Do Karate. is a rock album that incorporates programmed electronic elements alongside the band's guitar-based sound. Contemporary coverage presented the record as a continuation of the band's ambition to become internationally successful, while the song-by-song material ranged from electronic and metal-influenced tracks to melodic rock and more reflective compositions.

All lyrics and music were written by Yoohei Kawakami, and all tracks were arranged by [Champagne].

== Songs ==
=== "Rise" ===
"Rise" opens with electronic-style sound effects and piano before developing into a larger rock arrangement. Kawakami described its melody as one of the strongest he had written up to that point. The song was later included as a coupling track on the double A-side single "Run Away" / "Oblivion", released in December 2013.

=== "Stimulator" ===
"Stimulator" was promoted with a music video. The track was constructed primarily around programmed elements while retaining a fast beat and prominent bass line.

=== "Starrrrrrr" ===
"Starrrrrrr" had previously appeared as the first track of the double A-side single "Starrrrrrr" / "Namidaga Koboresou", released on January 23, 2013. The album version differs from the single release by removing the carbonated sound effects used in the original version and adding an extended outro. The official band discography confirms the single's release before the album.

=== "Kick & Spin" ===
"Kick & Spin" combines electronic and metal-influenced elements and was promoted with a music video. It was the final song completed for the album, and Kawakami later identified it as his favourite track on the record. The video depicts two women competing over the last piece of fried chicken in an izakaya by playing acchi-muite-hoi. A later Oricon feature similarly described the video as "a playful battle over the final piece of karaage" and noted Kawakami's fondness for the song.

=== "Travel" ===
"Travel" concerns the experience of being part of a touring band.

=== "Wanna Get Out" ===
"Wanna Get Out" begins with an introduction influenced by Chinese musical motifs. Its lyrics center on the life of a salaried office worker.

=== "This Is Teenage" ===
"This Is Teenage" was initially considered for release as a single. Kawakami reportedly decided to retain it for the album because he was still inexperienced with programming and did not yet consider the recording suitable for a standalone release.

=== "Plus Altra" ===
"Plus Altra" closes the album.

== Promotion and touring ==
Music videos were released for "Starrrrrrr", "Namidaga Koboresou", "Stimulator" and "Kick & Spin".

The album was followed by the We Don't Learn Anything Tour in 2013 and 2014, which began at Chiba Look on September 13, 2013. The tour later included the band's first headlining concert at the Nippon Budokan on March 28, 2014. Before the tour, [Champagne] held their Premium V.I.P. Party 2013 at Zepp DiverCity on July 15, 2013, and performed at a number of festivals and events.

The album was also selected as one of the first-round nominees for the sixth CD Shop Awards, alongside releases by artists including Gen Hoshino, One Ok Rock, Sakanaction and Miwa.

== Track listing ==
All tracks are written by Yoohei Kawakami.

No.	Title	Length
1.	"Rise"	5:16
2.	"Stimulator"	3:14
3.	"Starrrrrrr"	5:13
4.	"Kick & Spin"	4:30
5.	"Namidaga Koboresou"	4:02
6.	"Ho!"	4:19
7.	"Forever Young"	4:01
8.	"Travel"	3:14
9.	"Wanna Get Out"	5:34
10.	"This Is Teenage"	3:37
11.	"Plus Altra"	4:09
Total length:		47:09

== Personnel ==
Credits are retrieved from the album's liner notes, which are written in English.

=== [Alexandros] (as [Champagne]) ===
- Yoohei Kawakami – vocals, guitar, producer
- Hiroyuki Isobe – bass, chorus, producer
- Masaki Shirai – guitar, producer
- Satoyasu Shomura – drums, producer

=== Additional personnel ===
- Rose (of The Led Snail) – keyboards
- Kei Kusama (Kurid) – programming
- Satoshi Hosoi (Kurid) – recording, mixing
- Junya Iwata – recording on tracks 3 and 5
- Hiromichi "Tucky" Takiguchi – mastering (Parasight Mastering, Tokyo)
- UK Project/UKPM – sales promotion, promotion
- Yuki Kawamoto – art direction, photography
- Sakaiwai (UKPM) – art design
- Maki Sakata (Vicca) – hair and makeup
- Manabu "Exa" Kawamura (Tight Records) – sound engineer
- Ayumi "Udon" Hayashi (Tight Records) – monitor engineer
- Kazunori Mogi (Kyoritz) – lighting designer
- Daichi Takahashi (Daichigumi Co., Ltd.) – sound coordinator, equipment technician
- Ikki Chida (UKPM) – label producer, artist manager
- Kunitaka Ito (UKPM) – artist manager

=== Acknowledgements ===
- Hideaki Iwashita (Livemasters Inc.)
- Somei Rikitake (Greens Corporation)
- Kotaro Mase (Sunday Folk Promotion)
- Akio Igarashi (Smash East)
- Saori Taketami (Yumebanchi)
- Akihiro Misumi (BEA)
- Yasunobu Edo (Duke)
- Wataru Sasaki (GIP)
- Noriko Shimizu (FOB)
- Kazuyoshi Hasegawa (Moridaira)
- Yuusei Nagaoka (Ex-pro)
- Syunsaku Tsuji (Sakae Drums)
- Tomokaz Kawamura (LEP International Co., Ltd)
- Masanori Watanabi (Yamaha Music Trading)
- Hiroki Azuma (Yamaha Art)
- Kyo Takayama (LaLaLa GS)
- Osamu Shinomiya
- The band's fans

== Charts ==
Chart	Peak position
Japanese Albums (Oricon)	13

== Release history ==
Region	Date	Formats	Label	Ref.
Japan	June 26, 2013	CD, DVD, digital download	RX-Records	
Worldwide	June 26, 2013	Digital download, streaming	UK Project / RX-Records	
