= Schwarzenegger (album) =

Studio album by Alexandros
- Released: April 4, 2012
- Genres: Alternative rock, indie rock
- Length: 57:32
- Languages: English, Japanese
- Label: RX-Records
- Producer: Alexandros (as Champagne)

[Alexandros] chronology
I Wanna Go to Hawaii. (2011)	Schwarzenegger (2012)	Me No Do Karate. (2013)

Singles from Schwarzenegger
- 1. "Ie" Released: July 20, 2011; 2. "spy" Released: December 14, 2011; 3. "Kill Me If You Can" Released: July 11, 2012

Schwarzenegger is the third studio album by the Japanese rock band Alexandros, released under their former name, Champagne. It was released in Japan on April 4, 2012 through RX-Records, and was distributed by UK Project. The album contains thirteen tracks, including the previously released singles "Ie" and "spy". It reached number 10 on the Oricon Albums Chart.

The album was issued in standard and limited editions. The limited edition included a DVD containing four performances from the band's self-organized This Summer Festival, held at Akasaka Blitz on December 16, 2011, as well as footage from the recording of the album.

== Background and release ==
In December 2011, Champagne announced that their third album would be released on April 4, 2012, approximately one year and two months after I Wanna Go to Hawaii.. A sixteen-date national tour was announced at the same time, beginning at Chiba Look on April 19 and initially scheduled to conclude at Shibuya-AX on June 29.

The album's title and track listing were revealed in February 2012. Music Natalie described the thirteen-song record as displaying the band's dramatic side and confirmed that it would include the 2011 singles "Ie" and "spy". The standard edition was released under the catalog number RX-059, while the limited CD-and-DVD edition used RX-057–058.

== Music and lyrics ==
Schwarzenegger is a rock album characterised by an aggressive and direct musical approach. In contemporary comments about the record, songwriter and vocalist Yoohei Kawakami said that he wanted the band to concentrate on attacking rather than holding back. Contemporary coverage described the album as stylistically varied while addressing ambition, love, loneliness and darker emotional themes.

Kawakami identified "Kill Me If You Can" as the phrase that best represented what he wanted to communicate through the album. He described its title as expressing a determination to continue attacking regardless of the consequences.

All songs were written and composed by Yoohei Kawakami and arranged by Champagne.

== Songs ==
=== "The" ===
"The" is a short instrumental opening track. According to commentary associated with the album, it was the final song completed for the record. It was created after the band decided that beginning the album directly with "El Camino" did not provide the desired opening.

=== "El Camino" ===
"El Camino" is a mid-tempo song and was originally intended to open the album before "The" was written.

=== "Waitress, Waitress!" ===
"Waitress, Waitress!" was promoted with a music video. Its lyrics concern the relationship between performers and audiences at live concerts. The video was filmed at Ibaraki Airport. A notice appearing at its conclusion states that filming took place with special permission from the venue.

=== "Kill Me If You Can" ===
"Kill Me If You Can" was initially released as an album track before being issued as the band's fifth single on July 11, 2012. Kawakami called the song the most important statement on the album and said that it also occupied an important position during the accompanying release tour.

=== "Kids" ===
"Kids" begins with a guitar arpeggio and has been described as a comparatively simple composition. A music video was produced for the song. Its later concert footage was recorded during the Premium V.I.P. Party held at Shibuya Club Quattro on the album's release date, April 4, 2012.

== Promotion ==
Music videos were produced for "Ie", "spy", "Waitress, Waitress!", "Kids" and "Kill Me If You Can". The later video collection included on the band's second DVD also contained the videos for "Waitress, Waitress!" and other earlier releases.

To mark the album's release, the band held two Premium V.I.P. Party concerts: one at Shibuya Club Quattro in Tokyo on April 4, 2012 and another at Shinsaibashi Music Club Janus in Osaka on April 6. A national tour began at Chiba Look on April 19.The announced itinerary included performances across Japan and concluded with a Tokyo show at Shibuya-AX.

The tour performance was later documented on the band's second video album, I Thought It Was Only One Day, released on October 17, 2012. The first disc contained the Shibuya-AX tour finale, while the second included a tour documentary and a collection of the band's music videos.

== Track listing ==
All tracks are written by Yoohei Kawakami.

No.	Title	Length
1.	"The"	1:39
2.	"El Camino"	4:37
3.	"Waitress, Waitress!"	3:30
4.	"Dear Enemies"	4:06
5.	"Kiss The Damage"	5:18
6.	"spy"	5:47
7.	"Pa Pa Pa Pa Pa"	3:25
8.	"Girl In A Black Leather Jacket"	3:20
9.	"Ie"	4:29
10.	"12/26 Ikou-no-nenmatsu song"	5:39
11.	"Kill Me If You Can"	4:41
12.	"Kids"	5:57
13.	"Mayonaka"	5:21
Total length:		57:49

== Limited edition DVD ==
The limited edition includes four performances recorded at This Summer Festival at Akasaka Blitz on 16 December 2011:

1. "My Blueberry Morning"
2. "Revolution, My Friend"
3. "She's Very"
4. "Cat 2"

== Personnel ==
=== Alexandros (as Champagne) ===
- Yoohei Kawakami – vocals, guitar, producer
- Hiroyuki Isobe – bass guitar, chorus, producer
- Masaki Shirai – guitar, producer
- Satoyasu Shomura – guitar, producer

=== Additional personnel ===
- Rose (of The Led Snail) – keyboard

== Charts ==
Chart	Peak position
Japanese Albums (Oricon)	10

== Release history ==
Region	Date	Formats	Label	Ref.
Japan	April 4, 2012	CD, DVD, digital download	RX-Records	
Worldwide	April 1, 2013	Digital download, streaming	UK Project / RX-Records	
