= Bea Nettles =

American photographer

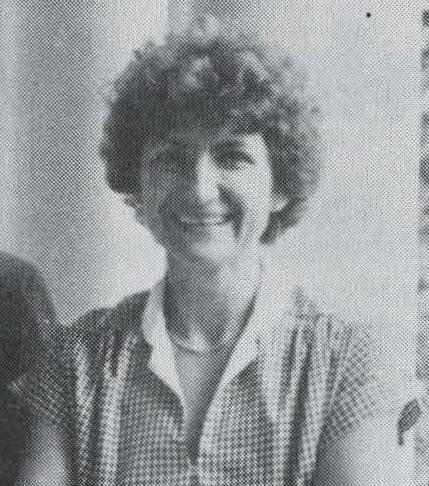
- Nettles circa 1980
- Born: October 17, 1946 (age 79); Gainesville, Florida, U.S.
- Education: University of Florida (BFA); University of Illinois (MFA)
- Occupation: Photographer
- Website: beanettles.com

Bea Nettles (born October 17, 1946, in Gainesville, Florida) is a fine art photographer and author currently residing in Champaign/Urbana, Illinois.

== Education ==
Nettles earned her BFA at the University of Florida in 1968. She then went on to pursue an MFA at the University of Illinois, graduating in 1970.

== Career ==
Nettles has been exhibiting and publishing her semi-autobiographical works since 1970. She taught photography and artists’ books from 1970–2007 at Rochester Institute of Technology, Tyler School of Art, and the University of Illinois where she is currently professor emerita. She has had over fifty one-person exhibitions including George Eastman House, the Museum of Contemporary Photography in Chicago, Light Gallery and Witkin Gallery in New York City.

Nettles is known for experimenting with alternative photographic processes. She utilizes several photo-mechanical printing techniques such as photolithography and silkscreen.

Nettles' work tackles issues of family relationships, woven together with mythology and natural history, often in dream-like juxtapositions. Like many feminists of her generation, she used her own body to explore the ways in which personal identities also reflected political and social realities. Art historian Jonathan Fineberg wrote that Nettles' 1970 "Suzanna...Surprised," for example, "demonstrated in the uneven brown-stained surface...the defiant subject matter.... She stuffed this unmistakably confrontational nude self-portrait and sewed it around the edges, then fixed it on to a faint image of a formal garden." Of Turning 50 (first published in 1995) critic Amber Hares wrote: "What is most noteworthy about Turning 50 is that Nettles, finding beauty in veins as she does in the vines that run up trees, is aging with grace."

In her later career, Nettles has excelled in book arts, teaching classes at the School of Information Science at the University of Illinois. She has traveled extensively, leading workshops on book-binding and book arts in Iceland, Italy and Alaska. She has also reflected on her earlier career through new collages and composite images, such as "Return Trips." Art historian Jordana Mendelson wrote of these juxtapositions: "When Nettles reuses a photograph from an earlier work and combines these new works with her mother's poetry, we are reminded of core ideas shared between generations in the Nettles family who have made the creative act an integral part of their lives."

== Books ==
Nettles has published many books, including:

- Flamingo In The Dark (1979)
- Corners: Grace and Bea Nettles (1988)
- Knights of Assisi: Journey through the Tarot (1990)
- The Skirted Garden: Twenty Years of Images (1990)
- Life’s Lessons: A Mother's Journal (1990)
- Complexities (1992)
- Grace’s Daughter (1994)
- Turning 50 (1995)
- Memory Loss (1997)
- Seasonal Turns (1999)
- The Observer, Philadelphia: Borowsky Center for Publication Arts (2005)
- Western July: Summer Instamatics
- Events In Water & Events In The Sky
- The Imaginary Blowtorch
- The Elsewhere Bird
- A is for Applebiting Alligators
- The Nymph of the Highlands
- Swamp Lady
- Dream Pages
- Of Loss and Love
- Lake Lady and Neptune(One-of-a-Kind)
- Ghosts and Stitched Shadows(One-of-a-Kind)
- Padded Parades(One-of-a-Kind)
- B and the Birds: A Collection(One-of-a-Kind)
- Grace Nettles: Poems & Dreams(One-of-a-Kind)
- Escape(One-of-a-Kind)
- Florida Fantasy(One-of-a-Kind)
- Events in the Water(One-of-a-Kind)
- Feasts and Feats(One-of-a-Kind)

Alternative Processes Textbook:

- Breaking the Rules: A Photo Media Cookbook (3rd edition, 1992)

== Collections ==
Her work is included in over twenty major museum collections including:

- George Eastman Museum, Rochester, New York
- Metropolitan Museum of Art, New York City, New York
- Museum of Modern Art, New York City, New York
- National Museum of American Art, Smithsonian Institution, Washington, D.C.
- National Museum of Women in the Arts, Washington, D.C.
- The Phillips Collection, Washington, D.C.
- Center for Creative Photography, Tucson, Arizona
