= I Wanna Go to Hawaii. =

Studio album by [Alexandros]
- Released: February 9, 2011
- Genres: Alternative rock, indie rock
- Length: 54:00
- Languages: English, Japanese
- Label: RX-Records
- Producer: [Alexandros] (as [Champagne])

[Alexandros] chronology
Where's My Potato? (2010)	I Wanna Go to Hawaii. (2011)	Schwarzenegger (2012)

Singles from I Wanna Go to Hawaii.
- 1. "city" Released: July 7, 2010; 2. "You're So Sweet & I Love You" Released: November 24, 2010

I Wanna Go to Hawaii. is the second studio album by the Japanese rock band [Alexandros], released under their former name, [Champagne]. It was released in Japan on February 9, 2011 through RX-Records and was distributed by UK Project. The album contains twelve tracks, including the previously released singles "city" and "You're So Sweet & I Love You". It reached number 14 on the Oricon Albums Chart.

The album followed the band's debut, Where's My Potato?, which had been released one year earlier. Ahead of its release, Music Natalie described the album as a work expected to capture the momentum the band had developed through its single releases and appearances at festivals and events during 2010.

== Background and release ==
[Champagne] released their debut single, "city", on July 7, 2010, followed by "You're So Sweet & I Love You" on 24 November. Both title tracks were subsequently included on I Wanna Go to Hawaii.. In December 2010, the band announced that the album would be released on February 9, 2011 and would contain twelve songs.

The original CD was issued under the catalog number RX-041. Discussing the album retrospectively, songwriter and vocalist Yoohei Kawakami characterised it as an intentionally difficult-to-define record created after the band had released and grown tired of its first two singles.

== Music and lyrics ==
I Wanna Go to Hawaii. has been described as a rock album incorporating elements of British rock, emo and punk. In a contemporary review, Dai Tanaka of Rockin'On praised the album's forceful yet catchy guitar riffs, dry rock and roll sound and moments of melodic transparency. The review also noted Kawakami's predominantly English lyrics, occasional use of Japanese and densely packed vocal phrasing. The album moves between harder rock songs such as "Tic Tac Toe" and "Revolution, My Friend", the melodic and energetic "city", and the longer closing track "Sateraito". Tanaka highlighted the contrast between the band's aggressive instrumental performances and melodic songwriting, describing the record as evidence of their growing appeal. All songs were written and composed by Yoohei Kawakami and arranged by [Champagne].

== Songs ==
=== "?" ===
The opening track is titled with a question-mark symbol. Its title is pronounced "Question Mark".

=== "Rocknrolla!" ===
"Rocknrolla!" served as the album's principal promotional track, and a music video was released before the album. The video's publication was reported in January 2011 alongside the announcement of the band's forthcoming one-man concerts in Osaka, Nagoya and Tokyo. The title was inspired by Guy Ritchie's film RocknRolla. The song had existed during the production of Where's My Potato? and was considered for inclusion on that album, but was reportedly held back because the band felt that its ensemble groove was not yet suitable.

Kawakami described its lyrics as depicting the way of life of a particular man, while leaving it to listeners to decide whether the song was autobiographical. "Rocknrolla!" was also included in Konami's arcade rhythm game Jubeat Copious.

=== "tokyo2pm36floor" ===
"tokyo2pm36floor" is an instrumental track.

=== "city" ===
"city" was released as the band's first single and had existed since their period of performing on the streets.

=== "You're So Sweet & I Love You" ===
"You're So Sweet & I Love You" was released as the band's second single. The ending of the track connects directly with the beginning of the following song, "Sateraito".

=== "Sateraito" ===
It was the first [Champagne] recording to feature keyboards and, at six minutes and thirty seconds, was the band's longest officially released song at the time. Rockin'On described the track as having a sweet or graceful melody that contrasted with the album's harder rock material.

== Promotion and touring ==
The album was promoted through music videos for "city", "You're So Sweet & I Love You" and "Rocknrolla!". Before its release, [Champagne] appeared at Countdown Japan 10/11 and participated in the seven-date Space Shower Retsuden Japan Tour 2011.

The band initially announced a seventeen-city national release tour beginning at Chiba LOOK on March 3, 2011. The schedule was later expanded with one-man performances at Osaka's Shinsaibashi Club Quattro, Nagoya Club Quattro and Ebisu Liquidroom in Tokyo.

The final concert took place at Ebisu Liquidroom on June 19, 2011. Rockin'On reported that the venue, which held nearly 1,000 people, was filled to the rear and contrasted the turnout with the band's first Tokyo one-man performance at the much smaller Shimokitazawa Club Que the previous year.

The tour finale was subsequently released on the band's first video album, It's Me And Me Against the World, on October 5, 2011. The performance included all twelve songs from I Wanna Go to Hawaii., as well as material from Where's My Potato? and an encore featuring "Ie" and "For Freedom".

== Track listing ==
All tracks are written by Yoohei Kawakami.

No.	Title	Length
1.	"?"	3:26
2.	"My Blueberry Morning"	5:00
3.	"Rocknrolla!"	4:15
4.	"Underconstruction"	5:34
5.	"Tic Tac Toe"	4:12
6.	"tokyo2pm36floor"	2:42
7.	"city"	5:46
8.	"Kazewohiitatokinouta"	5:49
9.	"Revolution, My Friend"	2:01
10.	"Cat 2"	4:01
11.	"You're So Sweet & I Love You"	4:41
12.	"Sateraito"	6:30
Total length:		54:00

== Personnel ==
=== [Alexandros] (as [Champagne]) ===
- Yoohei Kawakami – vocals, guitar, producer
- Hiroyuki Isobe – bass, chorus, producer
- Masaki Shirai – guitar, producer
- Satoyasu Shomura – drums, producer

=== Additional personnel ===
- Rose (of The Led Snail) – keyboard

== Charts ==
Chart	Peak position
Japanese Albums (Oricon)	14

== Release history ==
Region	Date	Formats	Label	Ref.
Japan	February 9, 2011	CD, digital download	RX-Records	
Worldwide	April 1, 2013	Digital download, streaming	UK Project / RX-Records	
