= Disappearance of Taylor Casey =

Unsolved 2024 disappearance in the Bahamas

- Born: July 11, 1982
- Disappeared: June 19, 2024 (aged 41); Paradise Island, Nassau, The Bahamas
- Status: Missing for 2 years, 1 month and 24 days
- Website: findtaylorcasey.com

Taylor Casey (born July 11, 1982) is an American missing person who disappeared on June 19, 2024.

From Chicago, Casey is a transgender woman of color and youth advocate, as well as a veteran of the United States Army. The fact she was transgender was originally hidden by her family, due to fears of discrimination. In summer 2024, she traveled to the Sivananda Ashram Yoga Retreat on Paradise Island (a resort island in the Bahamas). She had been a yoga instructor since 2009. Her visit to the island came following a January 16, 2024 travel warning regarding sex crimes in the country.

Casey was last seen the evening of June 18, 2024; the last time she and her mother, Collette Seymore, spoke, Seymore recalled sensing fear in Casey's voice. An unidentified man with a walkie-talkie, wearing a Boston Celtics baseball cap and black clothing was noticed near Casey that day. Casey was reported missing on June 19, after failing to attend yoga classes; she was confirmed missing by the Royal Bahamas Police Force on June 20.

In late July, authorities recovered Casey's iPhone and journal from the water after being led to their location by a search dog. Her family requested the Federal Bureau of Investigation search for her, citing possible discrimination from the Bahamas Police Force. Support for Casey came from Illinois senator Tammy Duckworth, the Embassy of the United States, Nassau and the Brave Space Alliance. Her family placed a $10,000 reward for information regarding her whereabouts.
