= Star 69 (disambiguation) =

Star 69 refers to "last-call return," the Calling Feature Vertical service code *69 keyed on a landline telephone set to give the number of the most recent caller to ring (in Canada and the United States).

Star 69 may also refer to:

- Star 69 (band), an English rock band (1995–1997)
- *69 (album), a 2018 studio album by Emily Blue
- "Star 69" (R.E.M. song), a 1994 song by R.E.M. from their album Monster
- "Star 69" (Fatboy Slim song), a 2001 single by Fatboy Slim from his album Halfway Between the Gutter and the Stars
- "Starsixtynine", a 1994 song by Lifetime from their album Seven Inches
- "*69", a 1995 song by Christine Lavin from her album Please Don't Make Me Too Happy
- "STAR 69", a 2025 song by Ayesha Erotica from her album precum
