= Emily Blue =

Singer from Illinois

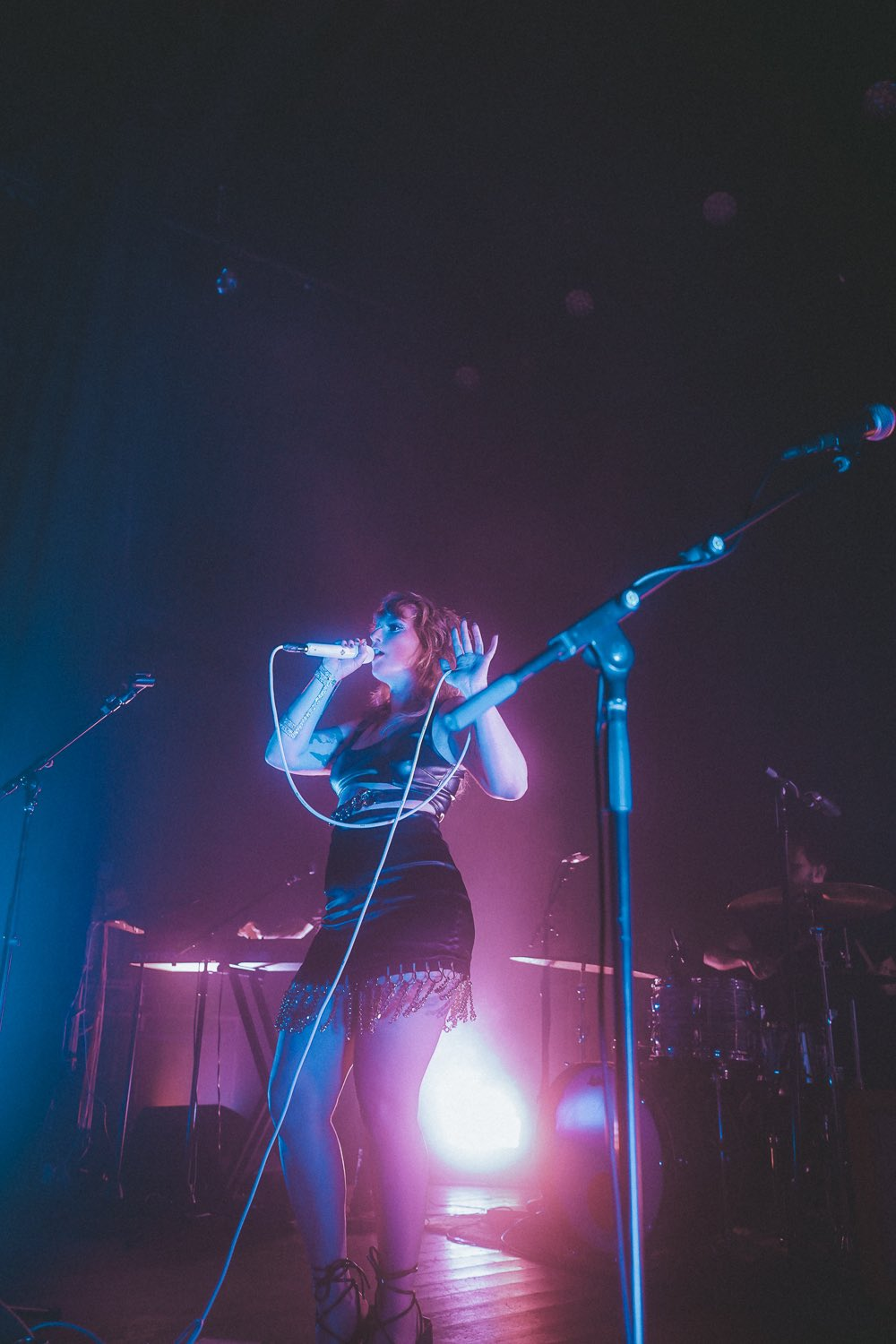
- Blue performing in 2021
- Born: Emily Caroline Otnes; June 28, 1994 (age 32); Urbana, Illinois, United States
- Occupations: Singer; songwriter; record producer; composer; instrumentalist
- Years active: 2012–2020 (hiatus); 2021–present
- Awards: Best Chicago Pop Artist
- Musical career
- Genres: Electropop; glitch pop; synth-pop; indie pop; hair metal; death metal
- Instruments: Vocals; piano; guitar; synthesizer
- Label: Audiotree
- Website: emilybluemusic.com

Emily Blue, born Emily Caroline Otnes (/ˈɑːtnəs/) (born June 28 1994), is an American singer-songwriter. She (Note: Blue uses both she/her and they/them pronouns. This article uses she/her for consistency.) has a solo career and is the lead singer of Champaign-based indie rock band Tara Terra. Born and raised in Urbana, Illinois, she now lives in Chicago and Nashville. Blue's career is characterized by sharp changes in musical style, and her releases fall into different genre classifications, ranging from synth-pop to avant-garde and death metal.

== Life and career ==
Emily Blue was born as Emily Caroline Otnes on June 28, 1994, in Urbana, Illinois. She wrote her first song when she was 13, and got motivated to become a songwriter. She says her mother was the guiding figure in her home, and that she inspired her by taking a powerful female role in the household.

She met Colin Althaus and Joey Buttlar in the early 2010s and they joined Nick Soria and Céline Broussard to form Emily Otnes and the Weekdays, later renamed to Tara Terra. Otnes changed her name to Emily Blue. Tara Terra released their debut album, Daughter, in 2014.

=== 2016–2017: Solo career and Where's Your Light? ===
Blue's first single, "No Pain", was released on August 6, 2016, with lyrics about rape culture. The Another Angry Woman EP, was released on November 4, 2016, with five music tracks and three one minute interview tracks. Its lyrics are on subjects considered taboo, but conveyed with a mellow indie pop sound. According to Blue, the title of the EP "is a title that intends to take a critical stance on our culture's lack of empathy towards survivors". All the income from the album sales and merchandise for Another Angry Woman went to RACES (Rape Advocacy, Counseling, & Education Services) organization.

Blue released the two-sided single, "Blackberries // Rico Acid" on April 7, 2017, with an up-tempo pop sound. "Blackberries" became popular on music streaming service Spotify. It was Blue's first collaboration with Max Perenchio.

Tara Terra released the Where's Your Light? album in 2017, preceded by the single "Like the Clothes". Huffington Post praised the track, labeling it as the band "[showing] off their rhythmic chemistry underneath Blue's falsettos and [Colin] Althaus's bright guitar riffs." It was described as having a harder sound than their 2014 release and received mostly positive reviews. The band went on indefinite hiatus the same year.

=== 2018: *69 EP ===
On April 6, 2018, Blue released "Cellophane", an experimental and heavily synthesized pop track. This became the first single from *69 EP, produced by and written with Bad City's Max Perenchio. It was released on August 8, 2018.

The second song from this extended play, "Microscope", was released five days before the EP was out. The sound on the EP was described by Chicago Reader as "a glossy, idea-packed EP whose five tunes burst with pulsing electro beats and walloping synth-pop choruses". It was also said that a few listens to Blue's "Microscope" and "Falling in Love", "make it clear that she can translate her razor-sharp hooks into any musical language". On the album's re-release, three songs were added to the tracklist.

=== 2019: Tara Terra reformation and ICONIC ===
On January 10, 2019, Blue commercially released Emily Blue on Audiotree Live with the songs from *69, except "Dum Blonde", and three of her earlier singles.

On March 8 of the same year, Blue released a pop-rock cover of Blondie's "Call Me", just three weeks before the release of Tara Terra's comeback single "Ithaca", which was revealed on April 1, 2019, premiering on Atwood Magazine. This album added Evan Opitz as official guitarist of Tara Terra.

On April 7, 2019. Blue released a five-track extended play: Couch Surfer, Lover.

The single "Bad Decisions" was made available on all platforms on June 28, 2019, Blue's 25th birthday. The cover art for the album depicted the singer mooning the camera in front of a McDonald's.

On October 11, 2019, the singer released an indie-metal fusion track titled "17" on Spotify. The song was described both by reviewers and fans and by Blue herself as inspired by Lana Del Rey.

On October 14, 2019, Blue announced an 18+ LGBT music festival organised by her, titled ICONIC. The festival took place on December 6, at Schuba's Tavern and included performances from Chicago band Flora, artists Carlile, SuperKnova, Thair and GirlBoifriend. According to the festival's site, a portion of the proceeds went to nonprofit organization Brave Space Alliance, a pro-trans rights organization.

On November 8, 2019, Blue won first place in Chicago Reader's year-end Best Pop Artist award.

=== 2020-present: COVID-19, new beginnings, The Afterlove ===
In 2020, in light of the COVID-19 pandemic, Blue launched an initiative entitled "Artists for Global Giving". The concept of the project was that artists in lockdown make tracks from quarantine within 24 hours, with all tracks compiled into a mixtape, the proceeds of which go to COVID-19 relief funds. Many artists promoted the concept on social media, with the process being dubbed "#1DaySongChallenge". The first volume of the project, "Artists for Global Giving | Mixtape #1" was released on March 25, 2020. "Social Distance", the fourth track on the album, is performed by Blue herself.

Blue released a new single titled "Aperture" on 8 May, which was first teased on 15 April. The song was premiered with a live performance on Good Day Chicago. The Deli called the song "ethereal" and said it was "more firmly planted in Dream Pop than Blue's previous singles", while Emma Maliborski of Chicago Haze said it "manages to send listeners to a vibrant landscape through their earbuds".

On 7 August 2020, following a live performance for Jack Daniel's via Audiotree, with two previously unreleased tracks "Prophet" and "Glow", Blue released a single titled "Trump.". The song is a protest song against Donald Trump in the genre of death metal.

Blue announced on Twitter on 27 August 2020 that she would soon release an EP. The expected date of the release is unknown as of now. On 9 October, she followed the news up with a cover of Lady Gaga and Ariana Grande's "Rain on Me", which features vocals from Chicago singer Thair.

On 26 November 2020, Emily Blue's long-term songwriting partner Max Perenchio died at the age of 33 in a car crash in Southern California. Perenchio produced the vast majority of her releases up until that point.

Emily Blue's first single of 2021, "7 Minutes", was released on 12 February. According to Wiwibloggs, it was sent to the song selection committee for Melodi Grand Prix 2021 before being released as a single. The song is the first release from Blue's third studio album.

"7 Minutes" was featured on Noisey's Top Tracks of February 2021.

The second single from the album, "See U in My Dreams", was initially scheduled to be released in June 2021. However, its release was postponed to July 23. It was met with positive reception, making it onto two of Spotify's biggest pop playlists. On the week of its release, the song peaked #35 on the Israeli digital charts, marking the singer's Top 40 debut.

== Personal life ==
Blue resides in Chicago, Illinois and Nashville, Tennessee. She is a supporter of LGBT rights and pro-LGBT organizations.

Blue is pansexual and non-binary and uses she/her and they/them pronouns.

== Discography ==
=== Albums ===
- Another Angry Woman (2016)
- *69 (2019)
- The Afterlove (2022)

==== Mixtapes ====
- Artists for Global Giving: Salud (2020)

=== Live albums ===
- Emily Blue on Audiotree Live (2019)

=== EPs ===
- Blackberries//Rico Acid (2017)
- *69 EP (2018)
- #1DaySongChallenge (2020)

=== Singles ===
- "No Pain" (2016)
- "Gene" (2016)
- "Empower (We Grow)" (2017)
- "Cellophane" (2018)
- "Microscope" (2018)
- "Call Me" (2019)
- "Bad Decisions" (2019)
- "17" (2019)
- "Aperture" (2020)
- "Trump." (2020)
- "Rain on Me" (2020)
- "7 Minutes" (2021)
- "See U in My Dreams" (2021)

== Awards and nominations ==
Year	Awards	Category	Result
2019	Chicago Reader, Best of Chicago	Best Pop Artist	Won
2020	Chicago Reader, Best of Chicago	Best Pop Artist	2nd Runner-up
