= Dumb Blonde (disambiguation) =

Dumb blonde is a deprecating stereotype of women with blond hair.

Dumb Blonde may also refer to:

- "Dumb Blonde" (Dolly Parton song), 1966
- Dum Blonde", a song by Emily Blue from the 2018 album *69
- "Dumb Blonde" (Avril Lavigne song), 2019

== See also ==
- "Another Dumb Blonde", a 2000 song by American singer Hoku
