= Forth Wanderers (band) =

American rock band

- Origin: Montclair, New Jersey, U.S.
- Genres: indie rock
- Years active: 2013–2018; 2025–present
- Labels: Too Far Gone Records, Seagreen Records, Sub Pop
- Members: Ava Trilling; Ben Guterl; Duke Greene; Noah Schifrin; Zach Lorelli

Forth Wanderers is an American Indie rock band from Montclair, New Jersey, formed in 2013. The band consists of vocalist, Ava Trilling, guitarist and songwriter Ben Guterl, guitarist Duke Greene, bassist Noah Schifrin and drummer Zach Lorelli. Formed while the members attended Montclair High School, Forth Wanderers self-released their first EP, Mahogany, in 2013, followed by the mini-album Tough Love in 2014. Following moderate success in the DIY scene, including a Twitter shout-out from pop singer Lorde, the group released their second EP, Slop, in 2016. The EP was co-released between Father/Daughter Records in the United States and Marathon Artists in the United Kingdom. In March 2017, the band played South by Southwest.

In 2018, Forth Wanderers signed to indie label Sub Pop and on April 27, 2018, released their debut studio album, Forth Wanderers. The album was produced and recorded in Philadelphia over 5 days in the summer of 2017. It received a 7.7 rating from Pitchfork and placed at #20 on Stereogum's "50 Best Albums of 2018."

In the summer of 2018, the band was scheduled to go on a U.S. tour to support the album, during which they were slated to play Jack Antonoff's Shadow of the City Festival and Jay-Z's Made in America Festival. The day before the tour was set to begin, on June 26, 2018, the band published a statement written by Trilling to their Facebook and Twitter pages announcing they would be cancelling the tour due to a "recently diagnosed mental health issue." The following month, they published another statement announcing they would be taking a break for the "immediate future."

In May 2019, Trilling wrote an article for Vice where she detailed her experience dealing with a panic disorder while being in a DIY band and further explained her reasoning for cancelling the tour. The band went on indefinite hiatus after the tour cancellation.

In May 2025, after an eight year hiatus, the group released a new single, "To Know Me/To Love Me", through Sub Pop Records. The following day, they announced their new album, The Longer This Goes On, which was released in July 2025.

== Discography ==
=== Studio albums ===
Title	Details
Tough Love	Released: November 30, 2014; Label: Self-released; Formats: Digital download, streaming
Forth Wanderers	Released: April 27, 2018; Label: Sub Pop; Formats: CD, LP, cassette, digital download, streaming
The Longer This Goes On	Released: July 2025; Label: Sub Pop; Formats: CD, LP, cassette, digital download, streaming

=== Extended plays ===
Title	Details
Mahogany	Released: November 24, 2013; Label: Seagreen Records; Formats: Digital download
Slop	Released: November 11, 2016; Label: Father/Daughter Records (US) and Marathon Artists (UK); Formats: CD, LP, digital download, streaming

=== Live albums ===
Title	Details
Forth Wanderers - Audiotree Live	Released: June 21, 2017; Label: Audiotree Live; Formats: Digital download, streaming
