= Thanya Iyer =

- Origin: Montreal, Quebec
- Genre: experimental pop
- Occupations: Musician, songwriter
- Label: Topshelf Records
- Website: http://www.thanyaiyer.com/

Thanya Iyer is a Canadian singer and violinist from Montreal, Quebec, whose album KIND was longlisted for the 2021 Polaris Music Prize.

Her debut album, Do You Dream?, was released in 2016, followed by Do You Dream? Mixtape in 2018 and KIND in 2020. In 2022, she released the EP Rest.

Her third album, TIDE/TIED, was released on April 30, 2025. Iyer noted music from Moses Sumney, Beverly Glenn-Copeland, Florist, Pompey, Macie Stewart, Sudan Archives, Nick Hakim, Emilie Kahn, Kara Jackson, Land of Talk, KAINA and Genevieve Artadi as inspiration for this album. Pop critics from The New York Times mentioned that "I Am Here Now" was "a five-minute haven of wellness." She went on tour later in the year along with Tenci, La Luz and The Dears to support the album in the U.S., Canada, and Europe.
