= Tenci =

American band

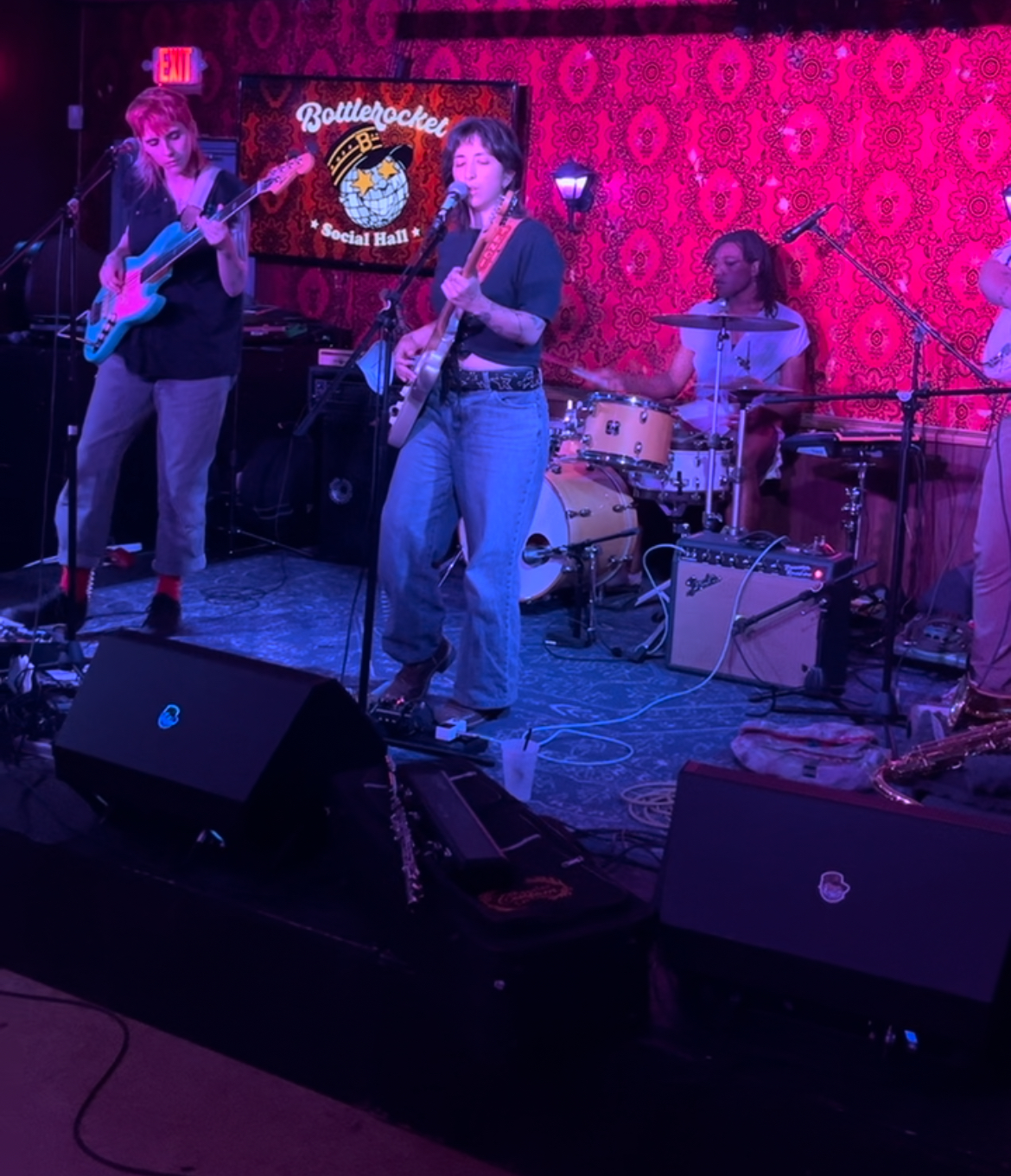
- Tenci performing in Pittsburgh in 2024

Background information
- Origin: Chicago, Illinois
- Genres: Indie; Folk
- Labels: Hobbies; Keeled Scales
- Members: Jess Shoman; Curtis Oren; Joseph Farago; Isabel Reidy
- Past members: Tina Scarpello; Spencer Radcliffe
- Website: https://tenci.band/

Tenci is an American band from Chicago, Illinois.

The group is fronted by Jess Shoman on vocals and guitar, with Curtis Oren on saxophone and guitar, Izzy Reidy on bass, and Joseph Farago on drums.

== History ==
Jess Shoman began making music at the age of 14. She taught herself to play guitar by watching YouTube videos and sang in the high school choir.

Shoman named her band after her grandmother Hortencia. When speaking about her, Shoman has said, “My grandma's not a musician, but I remember always hearing her singing while she was doing chores. She has this really beautiful, romantic vibrato and I feel like I at first subtly started mimicking that. Our voices are similar in that way.”

In 2018, she released her first EP, I opened my mouth and nothing came out, under the name Tenci. Shoman sang and played guitar on the project while Spencer Radcliffe played keys and percussion and Tina Scarpello played bass. Radcliffe mixed the project and Michael Mac mastered it.

In 2020, shortly after many industries first shut down due to the COVID-19 pandemic, Shoman organized 21 of her fellow Chicago musicians in less than a week to create the compilation project Days Go By with all proceeds of the project going to Brave Space Alliance, a Black/trans/LGBTQI center on the South Side of Chicago and Black and Pink Chi, an organization that fights alongside incarcerated LGBTQI/HIV+ people for prison abolition. Shoman contributed with Tenci track, "Bugs", that included her singing and playing guitar, Ashley Guerrero on drums, Camila Montoya on second guitar, Ella Williams (Squirrel Flower) and Merce Lemon singing harmonies, Curt Oren on flute, and Emily Jane Powers on violin. Michael Mac mixed and mastered the track.

On June 5, 2020, Tenci released their first full-length album titled My Heart Is an Open Field. The album was first released through Hobbies, a small label based in Chicago, before being more widely released through Keeled Scales. In addition to Shoman, the album also features Spencer Radcliffe on lead guitar and upright piano, Tina Scarpello on bass, Jack Schemenauer on drums, Madison Chessare on cello, Joseph Farago on xylophone and synth, Sydney Haliburton on synth, Scott Quider on pedal steel guitar, and Curt Oren on saxophone and flute. The album was mixed and mastered by Michael Mac. Track "Blue Spring" features a voicemail from Shoman's grandmother, Hortencia. The album title was inspired by Arthur Russell's album Love Is Overtaking Me. The album received a 7.3 rating from Pitchfork. In 2020, Tenci was named one of the best new artists of the year by NPR Music.

In 2022, Tenci released A Swollen River, A Well Overflowing, with the solidified line-up of Jess Shoman, Curtis Oren, Izzy Reidy, and Joseph Farago. The project was recorded by Abby Black, mixed by Melina Duterte, and mastered by Piper Payne. The album received a 7.5 rating from Pitchfork, who praised the newfound solidity of the band, alongside its ability to "allow Shoman’s talent for harnessing silence to flourish and grow". After the album's release, the band embarked on a 40-city tour.

In 2025, they went on tour in the U.S. with Thanya Iyer.

== Discography ==
=== Studio albums ===
- My Heart Is an Open Field (2020, Keeled Scales)
- A Swollen River, a Well Overflowing (2022, Keeled Scales)

=== EPs ===
- I opened my mouth and nothing came out, 2018
- this is how we know music with hemlock, 2025

=== Compilation Albums ===
- Days Go By, 2020

=== Singles ===
- "Bubblegum", 2024
