= Jordana =

Jordana is both a feminine given name and a surname. Notable people with the name include:

== Given name ==
- Jordana Beatty (born 1998), Australian actress
- Jordana Brewster (born 1980), American actress
- Jordana Mendelson (born 1970), American historian of Spanish art
- Jordana (producer), Jordana LeSesne, American musician, producer, DJ, vocalist, activist, and futurist
- Jordana (musician), full name Jordana Nye, American musician
- Jordana Spiro (born 1977), American film and television actress

== Surname or title ==
- Camélia Jordana, French pop singer
- Francisco Gómez-Jordana, 1st Count of Jordana (1876–1944), Spanish soldier and Foreign Minister
- Jordi Jordana Rossell (born 1960), Andorran lawyer and politician
- Michaele Jordana, Canadian artist and musician

== Fictional characters ==
- Jordana (Ninjago), character in Ninjago
