= Amasa Hines =

American rock band

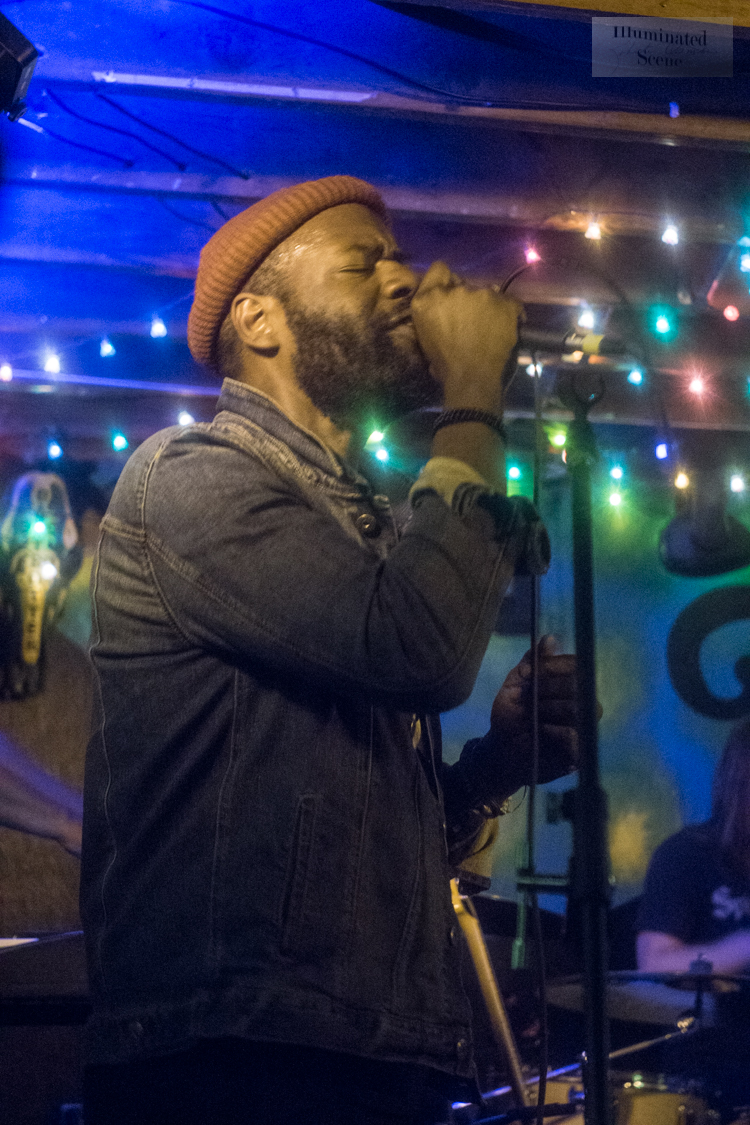

Amasa Hines is an American rock band from Little Rock, Arkansas.

== History ==
Amasa Hines is a five-piece rock band based in Little Rock, Arkansas. Formed in 2013, their influences span a diverse spectrum from soul to indie rock. The tight-knit group skillfully shapes their songs from homages, snapshots, skeletons and obsessions. Their lush, dynamic arrangements provide the platform for lyrical content sourced from observing intimate relationships, nature, and the perceived divine. The band cites TV On The Radio, Spoon, Shabazz Palaces and Radiohead as influences, among other.

A new five-song EP "Ivory Loving Glass" was released late in 2018 and is to followed by a full-length follow up to their debut album “All The World There Is."

== Press ==
In 2012, Amasa Hines was listed as one of "12 Arkansas Bands You Should Be Listening to Now" by Paste Magazine and also earned the "Reader's Choice for best band in Arkansas" award as designated by the Arkansas Times. In 2014, they were listed as one of "10 Southern Rock Bands to Listen to Now" by Southern Living Magazine.

== Independent status ==
Amasa Hines released their first album "All the World There Is" (2014) independently on CD and Vinyl. Judson Spillyards was quoted by the Arkansas Times as "...not opposed to signing with a label, as long as it's right". The band has recorded sessions on Daytrotter and Audiotree.tv. The full-length album ('All the World There Is") and the Audiotree.tv sessions are available on iTunes.

== Tours and notable appearances ==
Amasa Hines had a breakout year in 2016, making appearances at notable festivals all over the United States, including SXSW and Newport Folk Festival.

== Members ==
- Joshua Asante – Vocals, Keys, Guitar, Samples
- Judson Spillyards – Guitar and Vocals
- Ryan Hitt – Bass and Keys
- Norman Williamson – Keys and Saxophone

== Discography ==
- All the World There Is (2014)
- Ivory Loving Glass (2018)
