= Kinoko Teikoku =

Japanese band

- Also known as: Kinoko
- Origin: Japan
- Genres: Indie rock, shoegaze, dream pop, post-rock
- Years active: 2007–2019
- Labels: Daizawa Records/UK.PROJECT, EMI Records
- Members: Chiaki Satō (vocals, guitar); A-chan (guitar, keyboards); Shigeaki Taniguchi (bass); Kon Nishimura (drums)
- Website: www.kinokoteikoku.com at the Wayback Machine (archived November 18, 2019)

Kinoko Teikoku (きのこ帝国; literally "Mushroom Empire") was a Japanese shoegaze/dream pop band.

Their first EP, Long Good Bye, peaked in the Oricon Albums Chart at #56 on the week of December 4, 2013. Their 2016 album Ai no Yukue peaked at #19 on Oricon Album Chart on December 14, 2016.

Time Lapse was their last and most successful album, released on September 12, 2018. It peaked #14 on Oricon Album Chart. On May 27, 2019, the band announced they will be suspending activity.

The group was composed of Satō Chiaki (佐藤千亜妃) as vocals and guitar, A-chan (あーちゃん) on the guitar and keyboards, Shigeaki Taniguchi on the bass, and Kon Nishimura on drums.

== Discography ==
=== Albums ===
- eureka (February 6, 2013)
- Fake World Wonderland (フェイクワールドワンダーランド) (October 29, 2014)
- Neko to Allergie (猫とアレルギー) (November 11, 2015)
- Ai no Yukue (愛のゆくえ) (November 2, 2016)
- Time Lapse (タイム・ラプス) (September 12, 2018)

=== Mini albums ===
- Uzu ni Naru (渦になる) (May 9, 2012)

=== EPs ===
- Long Good Bye (ロンググッドバイ) (December 14, 2013)
- Sakura ga Saku Mae ni (桜が咲く前に) (April 29, 2015)

=== Demos ===
- 1st demo (2011, self-released)
- Yoru ga Aketara (夜が明けたら) (September 12, 2011, self-released)

=== Singles ===
- Taikutsu Shinogi (退屈しのぎ) (2012, self-released)
- Eureka (ユーリカ) (January 17, 2013)
- Tokyo (東京) (September 9, 2014)
- Sakura ga Saku Mae ni (桜が咲く前に) (April 29, 2015)
- Cry Baby (クライベイビー) (June 29, 2016)
- Natsu no Kage (夏の影) (August 29, 2016)
- Taiyou ni somuite (太陽に背いて) (December 13, 2017)

=== V.A. ===
- Daizawa Jidai (代沢時代 ～Decade of Daizawa Days～) (April 11, 2012)
- 『Yes, We Love butchers ～Tribute to bloodthirsty butchers～』 Night Walking (March 26, 2014)
- CHATMONCHY Tribute ～My CHATMONCHY～ (March 28, 2018)
- Takeshi Kobayashi meets Very Special Music Bloods (April 4, 2018)
