= Maybe April =

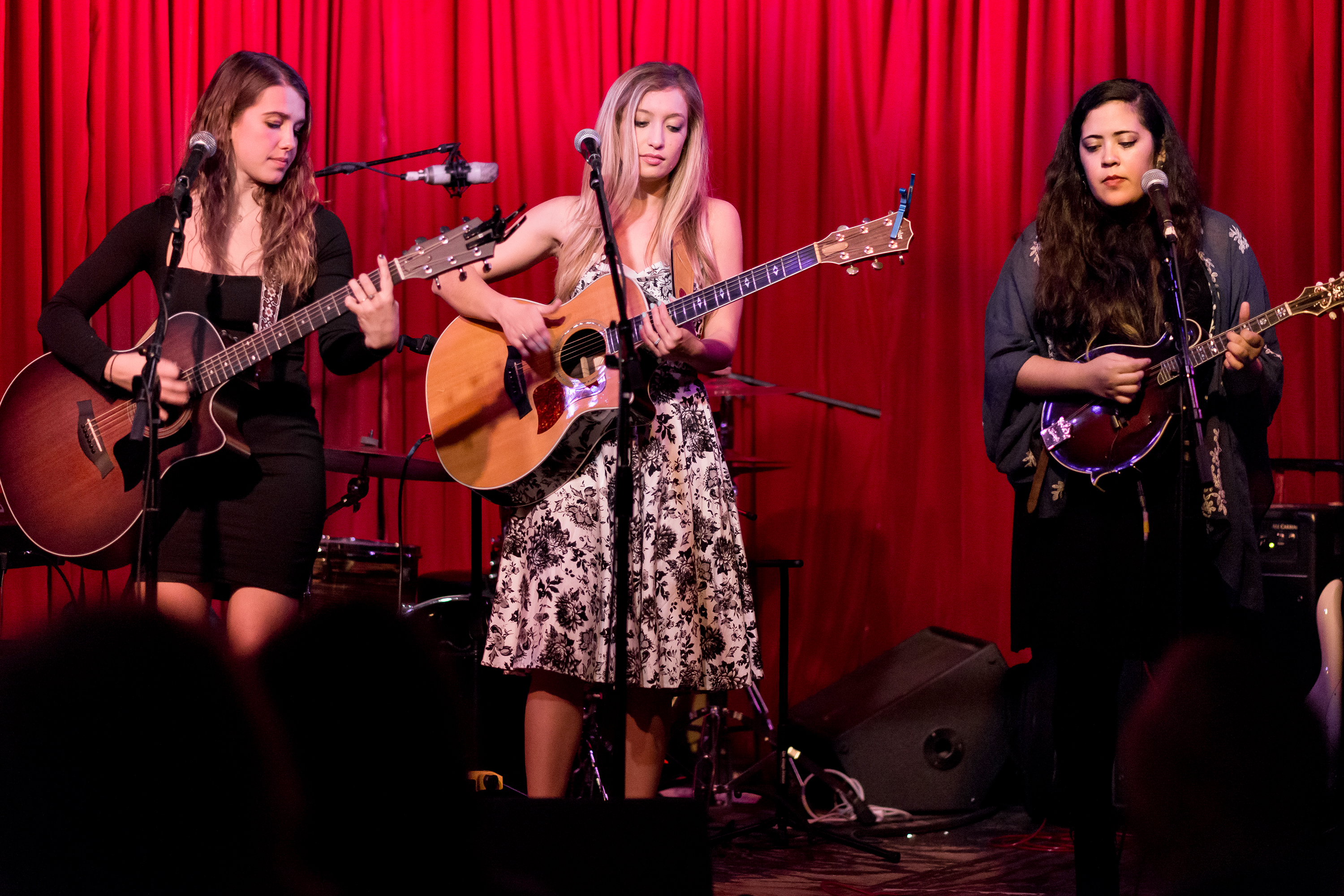
- The trio performing in 2018

Background information
- Origin: Nashville
- Genre: Country/ Americana
- Instruments: Vocals, guitar, mandolin
- Years active: 2012-present
- Website: www.maybeapril.com

Maybe April is an American musical duo based in Nashville who play Americana indie folk. They have opened shows for Brandy Clark and Sarah Jarosz. Singers Katy Bishop, Alaina Stacey and former member Kristen Castro met at Grammy camp in 2012. Kristen Castro left the band in February 2019. When they performed as a trio, their harmonies were described as "lustrous" and "spring-clear".

The lustrous harmonies of the voices; the appealing mix of their personalities; and their winningly under-amplified sound which lends their performance an almost acoustic quality. Those songs are a mix of country/folk-Americana/indie sounds and feature sophisticated lyrics that suggest the glowing beauty of this trio of feminine souls hides a certain amount of heartbreak and worldliness, though not the loss of a romantic spirit.

— Reviewer Hedy Weiss in the Chicago Sun-Times
