= *69 (album) =

2018 album by Emily Blue

Studio album by Emily Blue
- Released: August 8, 2018
- Recorded: 2018
- Studio: Audiotree (Chicago, Illinois)
- Genre: Electropop; synth-pop; glitch pop; noise rock; avant-pop
- Length: 24:35
- Label: Emily Blue Music; Audiotree; Midwest Action
- Producer: Max Perenchio, Uuskhy

Emily Blue chronology
Another Angry Woman (2016)	*69 (2018)	Artists for Global Giving | Mixtape #1: Salud (2020)

Singles from *69
- 1. "Cellophane" Released: 30 March 2018; 2. "Microscope" Released: 3 August 2018; 3. "Falling in Love" Released: 22 August 2018

*69 ("star sixty-nine") is the second studio album by Chicago-based singer Emily Blue. It was released independently by Blue in collaboration with Audiotree, originally on 8 August 2018 as an extended play, then re-issued on 27 March 2019 with four additional tracks as a full studio album. The album was produced by Max Perenchio (The Pelican Boy).

== Background and production ==
"My process varies per song. A lot of the time I’ll write a top-line or melody and bring it to my producer Max, and we’ll sort of spitball from there. Sometimes, though, I’ll use my guitar or piano to help me build a song skeleton. It’s always fun to try new methods. (...) Writing is where I feel my freest to express all parts of myself, so I try not to overthink. I pull a lot of influence from the radio, whatever I’m listening to on Spotify and old favorites like Lady Gaga, Beyonce and 80’s music."

- Emily Blue on the writing process of *69

Blue announced that she was writing material for an upcoming EP in March 2018, along with the release of the first single off the EP, "Cellophane". A few months after the EP's release, Blue added "Daddy" and three bonus tracks labeled as "voicemails" to the tracklist, making the EP her second full studio album.

== Composition ==
*69 is a synth-pop album characterized by sharp electronic instruments and a mix of heavy glitch- and '80s pop-inspired sounds. Do312 defined the album, when it was still in production, as "[m]oving far from her previous work", and "less traditional and more character-driven, painting a portrait of Blue as a fiery pop-songstress from another realm".

"*69 was, in many ways, me learning to have fun with my music. I was also learning my strengths as a solo artist in terms of identity and playing a 'pop' character."

- Emily Blue on *69

Musically, the album marked a sharp turn in style for Blue, whose debut album Another Angry Woman was composed of soft indie pop tracks. Scapi Magazine defined *69 as "a soundscape of vulnerability [that] cuts deep, though you might not realize it at first". They also praised Blue's "avant-pop, experimental ambiance". J.R. Nelson of the Chicago Reader described the style of the album as a "surprise" considering the genre of the singer's past releases, and praised *69 for its unique sound: "a few listens to Blue's radio-ready solo jams, such as Microscope and Falling in Love make it clear that she can translate her razor-sharp hooks into any musical language". Blue went on to win Chicago Reader's Best Pop Artist Award 2019 by virtue of *69's acclaim.

*69 co-songwriter and producer Max Perenchio died at the age of 33 on November 26, 2020. The album was his final studio album production during his lifetime.

Emily Blue is set to release an album in honor of Perenchio, titled The Afterlove, posthumously credited to him, having co-written and produced the album in the weeks prior to his death.

== Critical reception ==
The album's success with music reviewers was key in Emily Blue winning the Chicago Reader Best Pop Artist Award in 2019.

Wiwibloggs positively reviewed "Microscope" in their Wednesday Wishlist special in summer 2020.

== Track listing ==
Adapted from Spotify and Discogs.

All tracks are written by Emily Caroline Otnes and Max Perenchio, produced by Perenchio.

No.	Title	Length
1.	"Microscope"	3:44
2.	"Dum Blonde"	2:39
3.	"Falling in Love"	3:30
4.	"Waterfallz"	3:32
5.	"Cellophane"	2:54
6.	"Daddy"	3:30
7.	"Spit"	0:55
8.	"Whip Cream"	2:35
9.	"Just Want You to Love Me"	1:14
Total length:		24:35

== Personnel ==
Credits adapted from the liner notes of *69.

=== Musicians ===
- Emily Blue – lead vocals, lyrics
- Max Perenchio - lyrics (tracks 1–7, 9), production (tracks 1–7, 9)
- Uuskhy (Joseph Meland) - lyrics (track 8), production (track 8)

=== Artwork ===
- Ross Feighery - photography

=== Others ===
- Christian Mulvany
- Ryan Hadarah
- John Garrison

== Release history ==
- Original release (EP, 5 tracks): 8 August 2018 (on streaming platforms 10 August 2018)
- Full release (LP, 9 tracks): 27 March 2019
