= Vansire =

American dream pop band

- Origin: Rochester, Minnesota, U.S.
- Genres: Dream pop; bedroom pop; lo-fi
- Years active: 2015–present
- Label: Spirit Goth
- Members: Joshua Maclaughlin Augustin; Samuel Richard Winemiller
- Website: www.vansiretheband.com

Vansire is an American dream pop band from Rochester, Minnesota, consisting of Josh Augustin and Sam Winemiller. They are currently signed to Spirit Goth Records. Vansire has performed at ROCKChester and First Avenue, played a live session with Audiotree, and collaborated with artists such as Alexandros, Chester Watson, Jeremiah Jae, and Mick Jenkins.

== Formation ==
Vansire formed as band members Josh Augustin (vocals, synths, guitar, and drums) and Sam Winemiller (bass, guitar, and synths) were attending Century High School in Rochester, Minnesota. Augustin and Winemiller met while playing together on the school's drumline and continued to find themselves performing together through school activities (such as concert band and pit orchestra), something the duo says contributed to their creative synergy and friendship, which later helped in Vansire's formation.

In the summer of 2015, Winemiller approached Augustin after practice for the school's drumline with an idea to make a band "that sounds like Mac [DeMarco]". The pair's early recordings were made by holding instruments to the internal microphone of an iPad running GarageBand. Augustin and Winemiller, initially unsure of what to call their new project, turned to an online random word generator which landed on "vansire", an alternative name for the Marsh mongoose.

From there, the two continued to record together in their basements, living rooms, and bedrooms under the new Vansire moniker.

== Albums ==
=== Reflections and Reveries and The Rolling, Driftless North (2016 - 2017) ===
In August 2016, Vansire self-released their first album, Reflections and Reveries. The duo recorded the album entirely in Winemiller's basement in a roughly one-year period from August 2015 to August 2016, and included Winemiller's brother, Issac, on bass for some songs.

During this time, Augustin began studying at the Oberlin Conservatory of Music and Oberlin College, while Winemiller started at the University of Minnesota. Despite the distance, the duo vowed to remain committed to the Vansire project, now describing it as "a long-distance band relationship."

=== Angel Youth and After Fillmore County (2018 - present) ===
Vansire released their second album Angel Youth in April 2018 on Spirit Goth Records. Augustin and Winemiller produced and mastered the album themselves, and it is the band's first full length album that featured collaborations with other artists.

In June 2019, the duo released their single "Metamodernity", also recording an Audiotree Live session at Audiotree's studios in Chicago later that August.

In July 2020, Vansire released "Central Time", a single featuring Chicago-based rapper Mick Jenkins in their first collaboration together. In an interview announcing the single, Augustin said the single began as an instrumental demo that Winemiller sent him in September 2019, which sat untouched for roughly eight months until the duo returned back to it, finishing it up in the beginning of June 2020.

During this period of the band's history, Augustin said that Vansire found itself leaning in an "increasingly dance-oriented direction" with regard to musical sound, and that the duo has started to draw influence from more "dancey, funk-imbued music".

On October 16, 2020, Vansire released After Fillmore County, a seven song EP which brought back FLOOR CRY, and featured Philadelphia-based rapper Ivy Sole.

In April 2021, Vansire released a remix of Sydney-based producer-artist Swaine Delgado's "F Me Up", their first remix.

In May 2022, Vansire released their third LP, The Modern Western World.

In June 2026, Vansire released their fourth studio album titled Taking Solace.

== Discography ==
=== Albums ===
Title	Album details
Reflections and Reveries	Released: 18 August 2016; Label: Self-released
Angel Youth	Released: 26 April 2018; Label: Spirit Goth
The Modern Western World	Released: 12 May 2022; Label: Self-released
Taking Solace	Released: 05 June 2026; Label: Self-released

=== Extended plays ===
Title	EP details
The Rolling Driftless North	Released: 27 January 2017; Label: Self-released
After Fillmore County	Released: 16 October 2020; Label: Spirit Goth
The Rummer House Sessions	Released: 15 December 2025; Label: Self-released

=== Singles ===
Title	Year	Album/EP
"Bridges for the Young"	2015	Reflections and Reveries
"Postal Codes"	2016	Reflections and Reveries
"Pontchartrain"	2016	Reflections and Reveries
"Driftless"	2017	The Rolling Driftless North
"Brown Study"	2017	Angel Youth
"Halcyon Age"	2017	Angel Youth
"Nice to See You"	2018	Angel Youth
"Star Catcher"	2018	Angel Youth
"That I Miss You"	2018	Non-album single
"Metamodernity"	2019	Non-album single
"Central Time"	2020	After Fillmore County
"Just the Right Song"	2021	The Modern Western World
"The Modern Western World"	2022	The Modern Western World
"Kind of a Nice Time"	2022	The Modern Western World
"Vivienne"	2022	The Modern Western World
"Night Vision"	2022	The Modern Western World
"Bushwick Cowboy"	2023	Non-album single
"Statelines"	2023	Non-album single
"Years Roll By"	2024	Non-album single
"Love You All the Same"	2024	Non-album single
"Reflection No. 8"	2024	Non-album single
"From Your Own Eyes"	2024	Non-album single
"Part of the Dream"	2025	Non-album single
"Means So Much"	2025	Non-album single
"Legerdemain"	2025	Non-album single
