= Escondido (band) =

- Origin: Nashville, Tennessee, United States
- Genres: Indie pop folk, psychedelic folk, folk rock
- Years active: 2011–present
- Label: Kill Canyon Records
- Members: Tyler James; Jessica Maros
- Website: thebandesconsido.com

Escondido is an American indie folk band formed in Nashville, Tennessee in 2011 by Tyler James and Jessica Maros. They recorded their first album, The Ghost of Escondido, in November 2011 over a single day. They debuted later that month at the Mercy Lounge in Nashville. Their album was released in February 2013, with a video for the album's first single, "Black Roses", released on March 7.

Escondido released their second album, Walking With a Stranger, on February 5, 2016, and started touring with The Lone Bellow in support of the album in late February.
