= Jordana Mendelson =

American art historian

Jordana Mendelson (born 1970) is an art historian author, curator, and professor. Mendelson is a professor at NYU and, since 2020, Director of its King Juan Carlos I of Spain Center.

== Education and Teaching ==
Mendelson received bachelors in art history with a Spanish minor from Boston University in 1988 and her Masters and PhDs from Yale in 1993 and 1999, respectively. She currently serves as associate professor in the Department of Spanish and Portuguese Languages and Literature at New York University. Previously, Mendelson was an associate professor of Art History at the University of Illinois at Urbana-Champaign.

== Art Historian and Curator ==
An exhibit that Mendelson curated, Revistas y Guerra 1936 – 1939 was on view in Madrid at the Reina Sofia and in Valencia at the MuVIM in 2007. Her 2005 book, Documenting Spain: Artists, Exhibition Culture, and the Modern Nation, 1929–1939 which covered the same period as the exhibit won the 2007 American Society for Hispanic Art Historical Studies' Eleanor Tufts award and was shortlisted for the 2006 Modernist Studies Association prize.

Mendelson also curated Other Weapons: Photography and Print Culture during the Spanish Civil War at ICP in 2007.
