= Brave Space Alliance =

Nonprofit organization in Chicago, US

- Abbreviation: BSA
- Formation: 2017
- Founder: LaSaia Wade
- Headquarters: Hyde Park, Chicago
- CEO: Lynne Parker
- Website: bravespacealliance.org

Brave Space Alliance (BSA) is 501(c)(3) non-profit organization located in the Hyde Park neighborhood of Chicago's South Side. BSA provides supportive resources, programs, and services to LGBTQ+ individuals.

Founded in 2017, BSA is a community center on Chicago's South Side, focusing on offering free services such as beauty supplies, food, housing, and support groups. As of 2023, they are planning on a new center with increased support services for the queer BIPOC community. They partner with different community activist organizations to support a variety of fundraisers and rallies.

== Mission ==
Brave Space Alliance was founded and is run by primarily members of the Black and Indigenous People of Color (BIPOC) LGBTQ+ community. It is the first Black-led, trans-led LGBTQ+ center in the South Side of Chicago.

Community members are involved in developing and implementing all programming, services, and resources at Brave Space Alliance.

The organization uses a framework of mutual aid, knowledge-sharing, and community-sourced resources to achieve their stated mission.

== History ==
BSA was founded in 2017 by LaSaia Wade to organize and advocate for marginalized communities' equality. The organization's goal is to improve services and support for transgender and gender-nonconforming people of color.

Wade served as the founding executive director until stepping down in October 2022. Wade, who identifies as a queer and transgender woman, has stated in regards to why she founded BSA: "We needed something to hold other organizations accountable, especially around transgender and nonconforming issues." On May 1, 2023, former board chair member Channyn Lynne Parker took over as the CEO of the organization. Parker was a former director of strategic relations at Howard Brown Health.

In October 2022, BSA announced plans to create temporary housing in the South Shore neighborhood of Chicago. These changes include the construction and funding of a new center that aims to open in 2024. BSA expanded its program offerings, increased its national profile, and doubled the number of clients and staff served.

== Organization structure ==
BSA serves the queer BIPOC community with the help of mutual aid programs and a full-time team. BSA plans to expand and grow in Hyde Park. BSA services thousands of people each week with their pantry, support groups, and mutual aid programs. These aid programs help people experiencing housing and food insecurity and provide safety for sex workers. Lockers are offered for the homeless, as well as free makeup, wigs, and other supplies.

== Services ==
There are a variety of services BSA provides in order to foster a safe space for queer and gender non-conforming BIPOC.

=== The Dignity Suite ===
BSA provides a suite for all people, with a centering of BIPOC folks, that offers makeup, wigs, and other forms of gender-affirming care. There is a 30 minute time limit and participants can receive up to 20 items from this space.

=== BSA Free Store ===
This pantry delivers non-perishable foods to individuals in need. BSA partners with other food pantries, with the stated goal of creating a network of these services across the city.

=== Support groups ===
BSA regularly holds community support groups aimed at a variety of different identities: Rose Petals, aimed at Transgender women; Boi Talk, aimed at Transgender men; Fluidity, aimed at non-binary folks.

=== The Jasmine Alexander Housing Building ===
The housing program offers a temporary supportive residential program that houses community members for a period between 12 and 18 months. In addition to the services provided, individuals have access to a workforce development program, a financial literacy program, haircuts, and beauticians.

== Partnerships ==
In alignment with their mission, BSA's partnerships surround LGBTQ+ activism, with an emphasis on Black, queer, transgender people. BSA has partnered with different organizations such as Life is Work, Chicago Therapy Collective, Nikkei Uprising, Cary Bank, and Soul in Chicago.

These partnerships include working with LGBTQ+ organizations to hold rallies for transgender lives, relabeling "Trans Day of Remembrance" as "Trans Weekend of Resilience," holding candlelight vigils, fundraisers, and partnering with Cary Bank to promote financial literacy.
