= Yoohei Kawakami =

Japanese singer, songwriter and musician (born 1982)

Yoohei Kawakami 川上洋平
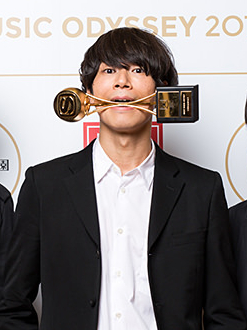
- Kawakami at Tokyo Music Odyssey 2016

Background information
- Also known as: Yopeko Toda
- Born: June 22, 1982 (age 44); Kawasaki, Kanagawa, Japan
- Education: Bachelor of Laws at Aoyama Gakuin University
- Genres: Rock; J-pop
- Occupations: Singer; songwriter; musician; radio host; actor
- Instruments: Vocals; guitar
- Years active: 2001–present
- Labels: UK Project; RX-Records; Universal Music Japan; Polydor Records
- Member of: Alexandros

Yoohei Kawakami (Japanese: 川上 洋平, Hepburn: Kawakami Yōhei; pronounced [kawakami joːheː]; born June 22, 1982) is a Japanese musician, singer-songwriter and actor. He is the founder, lead vocalist, rhythm guitarist and primary songwriter of the Japanese rock band Alexandros, formerly known as Champagne. He also hosts the Tokyo FM radio show Oto, Okashi (おとをかし).

== Early life ==
Kawakami was born on June 22, 1982, in Kawasaki, Kanagawa. Due to his father's work, he spent part of his childhood living in Syria from ages 9 to 15, where he attended an American school and developed an interest in classical guitar after taking an elective class in fifth grade.

Upon returning to Japan, he enrolled at Yaei West High School in Sagamihara, Kanagawa Prefecture, where he became friends with Masaki Shirai and Satoyasu Shomura, who would later become fellow members of Champagne.

In April 2001, Kawakami enrolled in the Faculty of Law at Aoyama Gakuin University. During his time at university, he formed Champagne and began performing street concerts, primarily in Yoyogi Park. Initially the band's lead guitarist, he later became the vocalist following the departure of the original singer.

== Career ==
After graduating from university in March 2007, Kawakami worked as a sales representative for a foreign manufacturing company while continuing musical activities with Champagne. Prior to the band's official debut, he also supported himself by working part-time in telemarketing. Eventually he left his company job in 2010 to become a full-time member of Champagne.

In 2017, Kawakami made his acting debut with a cameo in Closest Love to Heaven. He later appeared in various television dramas, such as Date My Daughter!, Hold My Hand at Twilight and Private Banker.

From 2020 to 2021, he collaborated with Tokyo Ska Paradise Orchestra as a guest vocalist and performer on two songs of their album Ska=Almighty, including "Almighty - The Masked Promise", which served as the opening theme for the Japanese Tokusatsu drama Kamen Rider Saber.

In 2025, Kawakami wrote the lyrics to the song "Play Out Loud", performed by the fictional band Tenblank for the Netflix original series Glass Heart, and was included on its accompanying album.

In 2026, Kawakami collaborated with SennaRin and Hiroyuki Sawano on the song "Endroll", which was used as an insert song for the movie Mobile Suit Gundam Hathaway: The Sorcery Of Nymph Circe.

== Personal life ==
Kawakami is a noted film enthusiast who has written a regular film-related magazine column titled ポップコーン、バター多めで ("Popcorn, with Extra Butter"). He has also discussed his interest in published interviews and essays.

Kawakami is a pet owner and has spoken publicly about adopting cats from a rescue shelter.

He has stated that he dislikes tobacco, alcohol and gambling.

== Musical influences ==
Kawakami has cited the British rock band Oasis and its guitarist Noel Gallagher as major influences on his musical style. The band's former name, Champagne, was derived from the Oasis song "Champagne Supernova". During live performances, Kawakami has frequently used an Epiphone Supernova featuring the Union Jack design associated with Gallagher. He has also expressed admiration for bands such as Primal Scream, Blur and Radiohead.

== Discography ==
=== Participating songs ===
| Release Date | Artist/Title | Song title | Participation |
|---|---|---|---|
| 2014 (Unreleased) | Possession=80.2 Por Cento; FM802 "Access Campaign" | "Haru no Uta" | Vocalist |
| March 26, 2014 | M-Flo; Future Is Wow | "Fly" | Feature, co-lyricist, co-composer, guest vocalist |
| 2015 (Unreleased) | Sugar & The Radio Fire; FM802 "Access Campaign" | "Music Train: Haru no Majutsushi" | Vocalist |
| October 11, 2017 | Momoka Ariyasu; Kokoro no Oto | "Drive Drive" | Lyricist, composer |
| November 29, 2017 | Sugizo; Oneness M | "Daniela" | Feature, guest vocalist |
| January 8, 2020 | Takuya Kimura; Go with the Flow | "Leftovers" | Lyricist, composer, co-arranger |
| December 23, 2020 | Tokyo Ska Paradise Orchestra; Almighty: Kamen no Yakusoku feat. Yoohei Kawakami | "Almighty - The Masked Promise (ALMIGHTY ~ 仮面の約束, Kamen no Yakusoku) feat. Yoohei Kawakami" | Feature, co-lyricist, guest vocalist |
| March 3, 2021 | Tokyo Ska Paradise Orchestra; Ska=Almighty | "Multiple Exposure (多重露光, Tajū Rokō) feat. Yoohei Kawakami" | Feature, guest vocalist |
| January 20, 2021 | Leo Ieiri; Sora to Ao | "Sora to Ao" | Composer, arranger |
| May 12, 2022 | Vansire; The Modern Western World | "Yoohei FM" | Feature, lyricist, vocalist |
| January 31, 2026 | SennaRin & Hiroyuki Sawano; LostandFound | "Endroll" | Feature, guest vocalist |

== Appearances ==
=== Television dramas ===
- Date My Daughter! (ウチの娘は、彼氏が出来ない!!, Uchi no Musume wa, Kareshi ga Dekinai!!; January 13, 2021 – March 17, 2021, Nippon TV) – Played the role of Soseki Tachibana.
- Hold My Hand at Twilight (夕暮れに、手をつなぐ, Yūgure ni, Te wo Tsunagu; January 17, 2023 – March 21, 2023, TBS) – Played the role of Sosuke Yukihira.
- Private Banker (プライベートバンカー, Puraibēto Bankā; Final Episode: March 6, 2025, TV Asahi) – Played the role of an unnamed secretary.

=== Variety shows ===
- Ōta Ueda (Chukyo TV) – Made occasional guest appearances as a fan of the show and composed its theme song.

=== Radio ===
(All on Tokyo FM/JFN network)

- AlexandLocks! (A segment within School of Lock! under "Artist Locks!", October 2015 – March 2021).
- Oto, Okashi (April 3, 2021 – ongoing)

=== Films ===
- Closest Love to Heaven (Kyō no Kira-kun, February 25, 2017, Showgate) – Played the role of an English teacher (cameo appearance).
- Mobile Suit Gundam: Hathaway (Kidō Senshi Gundam: Senkō no Hathaway, June 11, 2021, Shochiku) – Voice role as a Davao citizen.

=== Magazines ===
- Apparel Brand "glamb" (2015–2016) – Modeled for the spring collection.
- Essay series in the fashion magazine Men's Non-no Web (Yoohei's Non-no by Alexandros' Yoohei Kawakami, November 1, 2016 – February 3, 2021).
- Essays for NyAera magazine (February 25, 2022 issue).

=== Advertisements ===
==== Web commercials ====
Panasonic × Kao Joint Project "#Sentaku" Campaign:

- Phase 1: "#Sentaku" commercial aired starting October 19, 2021.
- Phase 2: "New Life Edition" aired starting February 15, 2022.

TV commercials

- Paidy (Aired starting September 25, 2021).
- Panasonic's "#Sorezore no Sentaku" commercial aired starting February 10, 2023.

Large-scale billboard commercials

- Panasonic's "#Sorezore no Sentaku" campaign featuring individual members aired on Shibuya Station's street-facing billboards (14 screens simultaneously for the first time) from November 1–13 and December 7–8, 2022.

== Books ==
=== Serializations ===
- Monthly Classy – Started in the July 2022 issue.

=== Essay books ===
- Alexandros' Yoohei Kawakami's essay collection Yohaku (余拍) – Published on September 28, 2022.
- Alexandros' Yoohei Kawakami's Popcorn, with Extra Butter (ポップコーン、バター多めで) – Published on September 3, 2024.
- Alexandros' Yoohei Kawakami's 2nd essay collection Next Act (次幕, Jimaku) – Published on December 25, 2025.

== Awards and nominations ==
=== JASRAC Awards ===
| Year | Nominee / work | Award | Result |
|---|---|---|---|
| 2024 | "Senkou" | Bronze Award | Won |
