= UK Project =

UK.PROJECT ユーケープロジェクト
- Founded: December 1991
- Status: Active
- Genre: Rock
- Country of origin: Japan
- Location: Daizawa, Tokyo
- Official website: UK.PROJECT

UK Project (stylized as UK.PROJECT) is a Japanese independent record label and an artist management company which runs various music labels, artist management agencies and concert venues under its umbrella company.

== History ==
UK Project was founded in September 1987 with the theme of "discovering unknown ones" and has been operating under this concept ever since. The company is not registered with the Recording Industry Association of Japan, and as such is still regarded as an independent "indie" music company.

In April 1989, the first record under UK Project was released. The company itself, UK Project Co., Ltd. was established in December 1991.

UK Project initially signed a contract with Toshiba EMI (currently, Universal EMI R/EMI Records) in 1994 but the contract was dissolved in 1997.

UK Project operates under the model of dividing its artist management arm and its record production arm through the creation of fully owned private limited record labels under the umbrella of UK.Project. Artists signed to UK Project are usually managed by UK Project or one of its artist management companies, and/or have their records released under UK Project or one of its labels, or both.

Some notable UK Project-owned labels include RX-Records and Daizawa Records. Other than these two labels, UK Project continues to release records under their other brands, such as the Rice Records and Benten labels.

UK.Project also owns and operates a few music venues and restaurants in Tokyo, including Club Que in Tokyo's Shimokitazawa and Zher the Zoo in Tokyo's Yoyogi.

UK Project is based in Daizawa, Setagaya, Tokyo.

In spite of its "indie" label, UK Project is a music company that has signed many Japanese indie-rock bands which later went on to commercial success. Many UK Project bands have appeared in major TV programs, as well as major music festivals including Rock in Japan Festival, Countdown Japan and Fuji Rock Festival.

== Labels ==
- Wonder Release Records (August 1991 - )
- Rice Records
- TV-Freak Records (July 1997 - )
- Aaron field (September 1997 - )
- Tinstar Records (1998 - )
- Deckrec (February 1999 - )
- Libra records (May 1999 - )
- Daizawa Records (2001 - )
- Famires Records (2001 - )
- RX-Records (2005 - )

== Management agencies ==
- Light Agent Co., Ltd. (株式会社ライトエージェント) (2001-)
- UKPM Co., Ltd. (formerly Jidai Co., Ltd. (株式会社ジダイ)) (2002 -)

== Artists ==
=== Current ===
- Alexandros
- Asobius
- Cettia
- Dats
- Dip
- Fullarmor
- Helsinki Lambda Club
- Kettles
- Lost In Time
- Odol
- Ogre You Asshole (co-production with OYA)
- Paionia
- Pelican Fanclub
- Polly
- Riddle
- Ryoji & The Last Chords
- Seagull Screaming Kiss Her Kiss Her
- Spicysol
- Syrup16g
- Totalfat
- Tomovsky
- Your Gold My Pink
- WurtS
- Usotsuki (ウソツキ, Usotsuki)
- Uminote (うみのて, Uminote)
- Kafka (カフカ, Kafuka)
- Kinoko Teikoku (きのこ帝国)
- Tsuduku Band (つづくバンド)
- Tsubaki (つばき)

=== Previous notable artists ===
- Art-School
- Base Ball Bear
- Bazra
- Bigmama
- Boris
- Burger Nuds
- Condor44
- DMBQ
- Flamong Echo
- Doe
- Going Steady
- Hare-brained Unity
- Lite
- Lostage
- Karen
- Kishidan (氣志團)
- Mo'Some Tonebender
- Modern Dollz
- Nananine
- Otogivanashi (おとぎ話)
- Pre-school
- Pop chocolat
- Potshot
- Polysics
- Scoobie Do
- Serial TV Drama
- Sparta Locals
- The Boom
- The Novembers
- The Telephones
- Thee Michelle Gun Elephant
- Tommy and the Bonjaskys (an offshoot of Kishidan, led by guitarist Saionji "Long Tall Tommy" Hitomi for one mini album in 2008)
- Unison Square Garden
- Vola and the Oriental Machine
- Wrong Scale
- Wrecking Crew
- Your Song Is Good
- Remioromen (レミオロメン)
- Lolita No.18 (ロリータ18号)
- Yuzu (レミオロメン)
- Tsubaki Quartet (椿屋四重奏)

== Other activities ==
=== Venues ===
Shimokitazawa Club QUE (born October 1994)

Club Que is a fixture in Tokyo's Shimokitazawa and is one of the more prominent live venues in the city. The venue hosts a variety of live performances of bands from all genres, although it is more geared towards rock acts. The club also hosts DJ and club events after hours. Club Que has a capacity of 280 people.

Zher the Zoo Yoyogi (opened February 2005)

Zher the Zoo is located in Yoyogi in Tokyo's Shibuya district. It is a concert venue with a capacity of 280 people and is a bar after hours.

Fuchi Kuchi (風知空知, Fuuchukuchi) (September 2006 - )

Fuchi Kuchi is a small intimate casual dining restaurant located in Shimokitazawa. It has an indoor eating space, a terrance as well as an event space. As such, it sometimes hosts live acoustic performances.

=== UKFC on the Road ===
Since 2011, UK Project has held an annual summer event named "UKFC on the Road", which started as a nationwide tour but has since evolved into a two-day music festival with current and previous UK Project bands, as well as foreign and affiliated bands.

UKFC on the Road 2011

Venue/Dates: Zepp Sendai (August 11, 2011), Niigata Lots (August 10, 2011), Fukuoka Drum Logos (19 August 2011)
Artists: Bigmama, Champagne, Polysics, The Novembers, The Telephones

UKFC on the Road 2012

Venues/Dates: Osaka Big Cat (July 25, 2012), Nagoya Club Diamond Hall (July 26, 2012), Niigata Lots (August 1, 2012), Sendai Rensa (August 2, 2012), Fukuoka Drum Logos (August 24, 2012)
Artists: Champagne, Bigmama, The Novembers, Polysics, The Telephones

Venue/Date: Tokyo, Shinkiba Studio Coast (August 14, 2012)
Artists: Champagne, The Novembers, Bigmama, Polysics, Lost In Time, The Telephones, The ★ 米騒動, Paionia, 武藤昭平 with ウエノコウジ, Kinoko Teikoku (きのこ帝国, Kinokoteikoku), Riddle

UKFC on the Road 2013

2013 was the first year the annual tour became a music festival event held at Studio Coast in Shin Kiba, Tokyo with live performances and DJ sets.

Date: August 20, 2013
Artists: Champagne, Bazra, Bigmama, 伊藤文暁, Lost In Time, Potshot, Paionia, Riddle, Totalfat, つづくバンド, Unison Square Garden, ゾンビちゃん
DJs: 片平実 (Getting Better), 石毛 輝 (The Telephones)

Date: August 8, 2013
Artists: Dad Mom God, Dip, DJ ハヤシ／五十嵐 隆(弾き語り), Killing Boy, Kinoko Teikoku (きのこ帝国, Kinokoteikoku), Mo’Some Tonebender, The Novembers, Ogre You Asshole, Polysics, The Telephones, ゾンビちゃん
DJs: 片平実 (Getting Better), 庄村聡泰([Alexandros]), Shun (Totalfat)

Date: August 22, 2013
Artists: Asobius, Bigmama, Champagne, Kettles, The ★ 米騒動, The Novembers, Polysics, 静カニ潜ム日々, The Telephones, うみのて／ゾンビちゃん
DJs: 片平実 (Getting Better), Bunta&Kuboty (Totalfat)

UKFC on the Road 2014

In 2014, UKFC on the Road grew into a massive event with a tour, a two-day festival at Studio Coast and additional performances at the Monster Bash music festival. The event in 2014 also had live performances by UK Project bands past and present, DJ sets and foreign bands.

Venue/Date: Osaka Big Cat (July 15, 2014)
Artists: Alexandros, Bigmama, Totalfat, (opening act) DJハヤシ

Venue/Date: Nagoya Diamond Hall (July 16, 2014)
Artists: Alexandros, The Telephones, Totalfat, (opening act) きのこ帝国

Venue/Date: Sendai Rensa (August 8, 2013)
Artists: Bigmama, Polysics, The Telephones, (opening act) Asobius

Venue/Date: Shin Kiba Studio Coast (August 20, 2014)
Artists: Alexandros, Asobius, Bigmama, 銀杏Boyz (solo), 松本素生 (Going Under Ground), Mo'Some TOonebender, Pee Wee Gaskins (from Indonesia), Polysics, The Telephones, Totalfat, Helsinki Lambda Club, pirukuru, (DJ )片平実 (Getting Better)

Venue/Date: Shin Kiba Studio Coast (August 21, 2014)
Artists: Alexandros, Bigmama, 勝手にしやがれ, きのこ帝国, Magumi and the Breathless, ニューロティカ, Polysics, The Telephones, Totalfat, ウソツキ, Cettia, (DJ)片平実 (Getting Better)

Event: UKFC on the Road 2014 extra in Monster Bash
Venue: Kanagawa, Kokueisanukimann no Koen (August 23, 2014)
Artists: Asobius, Bigmama, Mo'Some Tonebender, Polysics, The Telephones, Totalfat
DJs: Bunta&Kuboty (Totalfat), DJハヤシ(Polysics), DJノブ (The Telephones)

UKFC on the Road 2015

The event in 2015 was smaller than the previous year. It was again held as a two-day event at Studio Coast in Shin Kiba. Instead, the event this year became more of a music festival, with three stages. Two stages located in the main hall had live performances, while a stage in the building foyer had DJ sets. As with past years, current and past UK Project bands and affiliated bands, as well as a foreign band, performed in the event on both days.

Date: August 18, 2015
Artists: Alexandros, Marmozets, Mo'Some Tonebender, Straightener, ストレイテナー, Totalfat, The Novembers, Asobius, Cettia, Dats, Lost In Time, Pelican Fanclub
DJs: ヒサシ the Kid (The Jerry Lee Phantom/The Beaches), 片平実 (Getting Better), 木下理樹 (Art-School/KillingBoy), 西村道男 (Getting Better), 斎藤雄(Getting Better), しもっきー (a.k.a.自称下北沢の守り神)

Date: August 19, 2015
Artists: Bigmama, Downy, キュウソネコカミ, Orange Range, Polysics, The Telephones, Helsinki Lambda Club, 武藤昭平 with ウエノコウジ, odol, polly, Spicysol, ウソツキ
DJs: 片平実 (Getting Better), K(uchuu,), 木下理樹 (Art-School/KillingBoy), 西村道男 (Getting Better), 斎藤雄 (Getting Better), しもっきー(a.k.a.自称下北沢の守り神), タロウサイファイ (Avengers in sci-fi)

=== Highline Record ===
Highline Record was an indie record store and record label located in Shimokitazawa, Tokyo. It was established in 1997 by a subsidiary of Space Shower TV. The record store at that time was managed by UK Project.

In 2002, Highline Records became a fully owned subsidiary of UK.Project.

Notable Highline Record artists were Bump of Chicken, Good Dog Happy Man and Nananine. Highline Record was dissolved in July 2006.
