= List of Conan episodes (2013) =

Conan
- No. of episodes: 160

Release
- Original network: TBS
- Original release: January 7 – December 19, 2013

Season chronology
- ← Previous; 2012 episodes Next → 2014 episodes

This list of episodes of Conan details information on the 2013 episodes of Conan, a television program on TBS hosted by Conan O'Brien. Conan hosted shows at the Tabernacle in Atlanta, Georgia between April 1–4. During the week of October 28–31, highlights of the past 20 years of Conan's show were shown.

== 2013 ==
=== January ===
No.	Title	Original release date	Guest(s)	Musical/entertainment guest(s)	Ref.
351	"6 Resolutions Broken, 3 to Go"	January 7, 2013	Courteney Cox, Chris D'Elia	Dan Soder	
352	"The Guy Who Drove a Hummer and Wasn't a Total A-Hole"	January 8, 2013	Kaley Cuoco, Anthony Mackie	Gary Clark, Jr.	
353	"Fool Me Once, Shame on You, Fool Me Twice, I Kick You in the Scrote"	January 9, 2013	Ricky Gervais, Deepak Chopra	Imagine Dragons	
354	"Betty White's Bud in Bieber's Bong"	January 10, 2013	Ryan Gosling, Kevin Hart	ZZ Ward	
355	"All Quiet on the Western Front, Until Someone's Car Alarm Went Off"	January 14, 2013	Christoph Waltz, Rob Riggle	Chris Mann	
356	"Smells Like Murder, But It's Probably Fish"	January 15, 2013	Jesse Tyler Ferguson, Teresa Palmer	Baron Vaughn	
357	"The Chamomile Conundrum"	January 16, 2013	Marion Cotillard, Jim Jefferies	Trampled by Turtles	
358	"Texas Chainsaw Seminar: How to Sell Chainsaws from Home!"	January 17, 2013	Martin Short, David Boreanaz	Jake Bugg	
359	"Siri, Where Is My Kidney?"	January 21, 2013	Timothy Olyphant, Busy Philipps	Coheed and Cambria	
360	"The Long Awaited Revenge of Zippy Smiles"	January 22, 2013	Julia Stiles, DJ Qualls	The Lone Bellow	
361	"Step Up 3D 2: The Stepening"	January 23, 2013	Kathy Griffin, Blake Anderson	Electric Guest	
362	"The Least Fantastic Pants of Professor Downplays-His-Pants"	January 24, 2013	Jack McBrayer, Gemma Arterton	Mo Mandel	
363	"Sweet Home Al-Jazeera"	January 28, 2013	Emmy Rossum, Dave Franco	Los Straitjackets	
364	"The Day the Mime Stood Still"	January 29, 2013	Dax Shepard, Genesis Rodriguez	Adam Cayton-Holland	
365	"Watch Tonight's Show and Live Forever* (*This Claim Is 100% False)"	January 30, 2013	Adam Scott, Sanjay Gupta	Ben Folds Five	
366	"Occupy 'Conan': When Outsourcing Goes Too Far"	January 31, 2013	Compilation special	N/A	

=== February ===
No.	Title	Original release date	Guest(s)	Musical/entertainment guest(s)	Ref.
367	"The Day Lincoln Joined LinkedIn"	February 4, 2013	William H. Macy, Harland Williams	Vintage Trouble with Booker T. Jones	
368	"Charlie and the Chocolate Factory That Was a Front for a Sweatshop That Makes Gym Bags"	February 5, 2013	Jennifer Lawrence, Nick Kroll	Randy Houser	
369	"Yahtzee at the OK Corral"	February 6, 2013	Rooney Mara, Jeff Ross	Dirty Projectors	
370	"The Strange Case of Case Strangerson"	February 7, 2013	Chris Tucker, Brian Posehn	Darryl Lenox	
371	"The Postman Always Butt-Dials Twice"	February 11, 2013	Don Cheadle, Bill Burr	Ed Sheeran	
372	"The Walls Have Ears, and Other Side Effects of This Medication"	February 12, 2013	Bill Maher, Celeste Anderson	Jackie Kashian	
373	"The Hunchback of Notre Dame Law School"	February 13, 2013	Matthew Morrison, Kathryn Bigelow	Lupe Fiasco with Guy Sebastian	
374	"Love Means Never Having to Say, 'Do You Think Your Friend Would Be into a Three-Way?'"	February 14, 2013	Phil McGraw, Julianne Hough	The Vaccines	
375	"The Surprising Bar Mitzvah of Seamus O'Flannery"	February 19, 2013	Andy Samberg, Josh Hopkins	Lisa Loeb with Chad Gilbert	
376	"'Walka Flocka Fame,' Said the Drunk Rooster"	February 20, 2013	Snooki and JWoww, Ken Marino	Mark Normand	
377	"The Roomba with a View"	February 21, 2013	Mila Kunis, Chris Hardwick	Family of the Year	
378	"The All-Girl Sausage Party"	February 25, 2013	Zooey Deschanel, Benjamin McKenzie	Japandroids	
379	"You Have the Right to Remain Naked"	February 26, 2013	Kevin Nealon, Nicholas Hoult	Tenacious D	
380	"The Legend of Legend Cove"	February 27, 2013	Johnny Galecki, The Miz	Hunter Hunted	
381	"The Exquisitely Subtle Beauty of a Perfectly Formed Badonkadonk"	February 28, 2013	Kunal Nayyar, Julian Newman	Eugene Mirman	

=== March ===
No.	Title	Original release date	Guest(s)	Musical/entertainment guest(s)	Ref.
382	"Kathy, Will You Marry Me? Give Me Your Answer in Tomorrow's Episode Title"	March 4, 2013	Jane Lynch, Justin Chon	Sarah Darling	
383	"Yes I'll Marry You, But My Name Is Karen, Not Kathy"	March 5, 2013	Colin Farrell, Jenna Elfman	Frightened Rabbit	
384	"The Ex-Cons Who Discussed the Pros and Cons of Prose"	March 6, 2013	Matthew Fox, Anthony Jeselnik	Ian Edwards	
385	"A Time to Kill Time"	March 7, 2013	James Franco, Robert Kirkman	Jamie N Commons	
386	"The Octopus Who Was a Master Pickpocket in Highly Specific Circumstances"	March 11, 2013	Snoop Lion, Rorke Denver	Snoop Lion	
387	"The Sophomore Who Took a Year Off to Find Himself Unemployed"	March 12, 2013	Zach Braff, Nina Dobrev	Alex Koll	
388	"Angels in Poorly-Made Devil Costumes"	March 13, 2013	Halle Berry, Ben Hoffman	Aimee Mann with Ted Leo (before joining forces in a new band The Both)	
389	"The Man in the Gray Flannel Snuggie"	March 14, 2013	Steve Carell, Camilla Luddington	Luke Bryan	
390	"I Just Called to Say I Love Wheat Thins"	March 25, 2013	Magic Johnson, Thandie Newton	Langhorne Slim	
391	"The Title with the Unnecessary Question Mark?"	March 26, 2013	Vanessa Hudgens, Jerry Trainor	Emily Heller	
392	"The Auto-Corrector's Last Will & Testicle"	March 27, 2013	Seth Green, Charles Phoenix	The Milk Carton Kids	

=== April ===
No.	Title	Original release date	Guest(s)	Musical/entertainment guest(s)	Ref.
393	"The Ginger Went Down to Georgia"	April 1, 2013	Seth Rogen	Earthquake	
394	"It's Not the Hotlanta, It's the Humidylanta"	April 2, 2013	Paul Rudd	von Grey	
395	"Gone with the Wind, But Don't Worry, We're Insured"	April 3, 2013	Steven Yeun	Darius Rucker	
396	"The Show Where We Partied Too Much in Atlanta to Think of a Good Episode Title"	April 4, 2013	Charles Barkley	Macklemore & Ryan Lewis	
397	"The Inspiring Journey of the Armless, Legless… Oh Wait That's a Snake"	April 8, 2013	Adam Sandler, Molly Shannon	Nate Bargatze	
398	"The Surprisingly Non-Ostentatious Summer Home of King Tut"	April 9, 2013	Matthew Perry, Nikolaj Coster-Waldau	Escondido	
399	"Beer Squad: Battle in Sudsville"	April 10, 2013	Jeremy Piven, Jeremy Wade	The Three O'Clock	
400	"Zero Dark Thirty: The Squeakquel"	April 11, 2013	Charlie Sheen, Tony Hale	Dropkick Murphys	
401	"The Episode Title with Misplaced Emphasis"	April 15, 2013	Chelsea Handler, James Lesure	Bengt Washburn	
402	"Keep Your Friends Close, Your Frenemies Closer"	April 16, 2013	Russell Brand, Jimmy Pardo	Beth Hart	
403	"Django Snowchained"	April 17, 2013	Jeff Goldblum, Tig Notaro	Fall Out Boy	
404	"Auto-Corrective Asphyxiation"	April 18, 2013	Eva Mendes, Chris Messina	Alt-J	
405	"Return of the Dawn of the Sequel III"	April 29, 2013	Brad Garrett, Amy Schumer	Old Crow Medicine Show	
406	"Are You There God? It's Me, A Courtesy Call from Time Warner Cable to Tell You About How Much You Can Save by Bundling Services"	April 30, 2013	Ke$ha, Andy and Johnathan Hillstrand	^{[A]}	

=== May ===
No.	Title	Original release date	Guest(s)	Musical/entertainment guest(s)	Ref.
407	"Green Eggs and Ham and Trichinosis"	May 1, 2013	Jon Favreau, Bo Burnham	Lukas Nelson & Promise of the Real	
408	"Sir Arthur Conan Doyle and the Ruination of His Middle Name"	May 2, 2013	Julia Louis-Dreyfus, Bob Saget	Shane Mauss	
409	"The Episode Title with the Inset Box of Me"	May 6, 2013	Keith Urban, Guillermo Diaz	Jay Larson	
410	"The Court Martial of Cap'n Crunch"	May 7, 2013	Edie Falco, Marc Maron	Iron & Wine	
411	"Press 'Pound' for Murder"	May 8, 2013	Simon Helberg, John Collins	Marina and the Diamonds	
412	"The Very Understated Adventures of Captain Beige"	May 9, 2013	Don Cheadle, Pete Holmes	RNDM	
413	"There Is No 'I' in Tim. That's How Unselfish He Is!"	May 14, 2013	Jennifer Love Hewitt, Justin Bartha	The Slide Brothers with Shemekia Copeland	
414	"IMDbCooper"	May 15, 2013	Zach Galifianakis, Jim Gaffigan	Beware of Darkness	
415	"'Why Are You All Laughing?' Asked the Glass Blower"	May 16, 2013	Zachary Quinto, Heather Graham	Jen Kirkman	
416	"The Princess and the P. Diddy"	May 20, 2013	Ken Jeong, Mary Lynn Rajskub	The Black Angels	
417	"Kentucky Freud Chicken and the Terrible Psychiatry Joke"	May 21, 2013	Ed Helms, Alice Eve	Cast of Workaholics	
418	"The Completely Flat Man… in 3-D!!!"	May 22, 2013	Jesse Eisenberg, J. J. Abrams	Thirty Seconds to Mars	
419	"The Illegitimate Rise of Steve Bastard"	May 23, 2013	Vin Diesel, Steve Schirripa	The Mowgli's	

=== June ===
No.	Title	Original release date	Guest(s)	Musical/entertainment guest(s)	Ref.
420	"Butt-Dial M for Murder"	June 3, 2013	Elliot Page, Craig Robinson	Myq Kaplan	
421	"The Exotic Marigold Hotel 2: Dench Does Dallas"	June 4, 2013	Nick Offerman, Lena Headey	Divine Fits	
422	"The Man Whose Darkest Secret Is That He Kind of Likes the Wallflowers"	June 5, 2013	Alexander Skarsgård, George R. R. Martin	Houndmouth	
423	"Alien Meets the Fokkers"	June 6, 2013	Danny McBride, Giada De Laurentiis	Capital Cities	
424	"The Limber Chef Who Tossed His Own Salad"	June 10, 2013	Vince Vaughn and Owen Wilson, Maria Menounos	New Politics	
425	"Do Not Ask for Whom the Bell Tolls, Because It's Out for Its Annual Servicing"	June 11, 2013	Jonah Hill, Ice-T and Coco Austin	Dale Earnhardt Jr. Jr.	
426	"Escape from Podcast Mountain"	June 12, 2013	Nathan Fillion, Bret Michaels	Erik Charles Nielsen	
427	"The Fast & the Dealing-with-Their-Fury-Through-Journaling 6"	June 13, 2013	Usher, Eesha Khare	She & Him	
428	"The Announcer Who Reapted Himself. The Announcer Who Reapted Himself."	June 24, 2013	Sharon Osbourne, Sasha Alexander	Roy Wood, Jr.	
429	"The Mysterious Case of the Two Talk Guests and One Musical Guest"	June 25, 2013	Heather Locklear, Nick Swardson	Mavis Staples	
430	"Never Name Your Daughter Dilda"	June 26, 2013	Elijah Wood, Chris Bosh, Bill Burr	Ryan Bingham	
431	"The Road to Hell is Paved with Good Intentions Brand Asphalt, Good Intentions Brand, Ask for It By Name!"	June 27, 2013	Kevin Hart, Chris Kluwe	Eve	

=== July ===
No.	Title	Original release date	Guest(s)	Musical/entertainment guest(s)	Ref.
432	"The Slowly Bobbing Adventures of Buoy Boy"	July 8, 2013	Armie Hammer, Angie Harmon	Brent Morin	
433	"When Your Friend's Kid Just Starts Listing Dinosaurs, It's Okay to Give Him Beer."	July 9, 2013	Mary-Louise Parker, Breckin Meyer	Portugal. The Man	
434	"My Friend Went to the Ed Hardy Outlet and All I Got Was This Lousy T-Shirt"	July 10, 2013	Kevin Bacon, Charlie Hunnam	Bernhoft	
435	"The Episode Where We Worked So Hard on the Show We Didn't Have Time to Come Up with a Great Episode Title, So Let's Just Call This One 'Steve'"	July 11, 2013	John Malkovich, Derek Waters	Skillet	
436	"The Day the Earth Stood Still Just Long Enough to Take One Good Selfie"	July 15, 2013	Charlie Day, Brittney Griner	The Neighbourhood	
437	"There, There, Don't Cry. Andy Just Went to Live on a Farm"	July 16, 2013	Howie Mandel, Professor Brian Cox	Mikal Cronin	
438	"Zero on the Richter Scale"	July 17, 2013	Noah Wyle, Ben Schwartz	Pretty Lights with Talib Kweli	
439	"Cheapskate Charley and the Taped-Up iPhone 3S"	July 18, 2013	Jeff Garlin, Olivia Munn, Pete Holmes	N/A	
440	"99% Effort, 1% Milk."	July 22, 2013	Bill Hader, Lake Bell	Jimmy Eat World	
441	"Dog Nerd-A-Palooza: Labradorks vs. Poodle-Dexters"	July 23, 2013	Aubrey Plaza, Kumail Nanjiani	The 1975	
442	"'What Is Jeopardy?' Said the Senile Alex Trebek"	July 24, 2013	Aaron Paul, Nick Frost	Bastille	
443	"Slow and Steady Wins the Participation Trophy"	July 25, 2013	Steven Ho, Peter Sarsgaard	Dwayne Perkins	
444	"Littering in London: Jack the Ripper's Lesser Crimes"	July 29, 2013	Eric McCormack, Mitchie Brusco	Franz Ferdinand	
445	"One If By Land, Two If By Jetski"	July 30, 2013	Neil Patrick Harris, Shailene Woodley	Dan St. Germain	
446	"Dragon Hunt 2: Scorchy's Revenge"	July 31, 2013	Kevin Nealon, Michael B. Jordan	Edward Sharpe and the Magnetic Zeros	

=== August ===
No.	Title	Original release date	Guest(s)	Musical/entertainment guest(s)	Ref.
447	"My Big Fat Greek Landlord"	August 1, 2013	Rebecca Romijn, Darren Criss	Tom Odell	
448	"Journey to Joke Mountain 3: The Laughening"	August 5, 2013	Lisa Kudrow, Diego Luna	Florida Georgia Line	
449	"Free Pizza for Everyone!* (*The statements made in 'Conan' show titles do not necessarily reflect the views and policies of this company.)"	August 6, 2013	Steve Martin and Edie Brickell, Leven Rambin	Steve Martin and Edie Brickell	
450	"Egg Police: Omelet You Go with a Warming"	August 7, 2013	Sharon Stone, Anthony Jeselnik	Julian McCullough	
451	"The iTunes Update That Made All the Difference"	August 8, 2013	Jennifer Aniston, Paul Scheer	Twenty One Pilots	
452	"Now You See Me, Now You Put on Your Glasses and See Me Better."	August 12, 2013	Val Kilmer, Amber Heard	Paramore	
453	"Conan and Andy's Laughquest '13 in 3D"	August 13, 2013	Liam Hemsworth, Chloë Grace Moretz	J. Cole	
454	"The Mysterious Case of No Wait We Did This One"	August 14, 2013	Eric Bana, Josh Gad	The National	
455	"Goodfellas 2: Betterfellas"	August 15, 2013	Harrison Ford, Donald Faison	Kurt Braunohler	

=== September ===
No.	Title	Original release date	Guest(s)	Musical/entertainment guest(s)	Ref.
456	"The Touchscreen That Didn't Like to Be Touched"	September 3, 2013	Jason Biggs, Alison Pill	Rory Scovel	
457	"The Self-Centered Man Who Called It 'MeTube'"	September 4, 2013	Mike Tyson, Katie Aselton	Spin Doctors	
458	"DoubleVision Theater presents: 24 Angry Men"	September 5, 2013	Carl Reiner, Cheryl Hines	Delta Rae	
459	"The Evil 'S' Who Turned Laughter to Slaughter"	September 9, 2013	Patton Oswalt, Robert Reich	Tony Deyo	
460	"A Bar Walks Into a Horse for a Change"	September 10, 2013	Simon Pegg, Martin Riese	Local Natives	
461	"The Man Who Would Be King, But Chose to Sell Home Appliances Instead."	September 11, 2013	Rose Byrne, Ike Barinholtz	Gov't Mule	
462	"Nurder, She Wrote Without Proofreading"	September 12, 2013	Key and Peele, Charlyne Yi	Wavves	
463	"Ted Nugent and Quentin Tarantino Present: Django Wango Tango"	September 16, 2013	Zooey Deschanel, Kirk Fox	Jason Isbell	
464	"The One Movie Even Nicolas Cage Wouldn't Star In"	September 17, 2013	Diane Kruger, Stephen Rannazzisi	Atlas Genius	
465	"Goodzilla: The Giant Lizard Who Taught Reading Skills"	September 18, 2013	Seth Green, Lizzy Caplan	Sammy Obeid	
466	"The Fast and the Bi-Curious"	September 19, 2013	Louis C.K.	Thompson Square	
467	"Mr. White Meets Mr. Extremely White"	September 23, 2013	The Cast and Creator of Breaking Bad	Los Cuates de Sinaloa	
468	"Now is the Winter of Our Disco Tent"	September 24, 2013	Jane Lynch, Natasha Lyonne	Mike Lawrence	
469	"The Black Guy Who Had Almost Every Springsteen Album"	September 25, 2013	The Cast and Creators of It's Always Sunny in Philadelphia, Melissa Rauch	Deer Tick	
470	"Word is a Four-Letter Word"	September 26, 2013	Andy Samberg, Slash	Slash and Myles Kennedy	
471	"The Microphone That Suddenly Went Off in the Middle of"	September 30, 2013	Demi Lovato, J. B. Smoove	Moby	

=== October ===
No.	Title	Original release date	Guest(s)	Musical/entertainment guest(s)	Ref.
472	"Fast Times at Ridgemont Retirement Home"	October 1, 2013	Adam Scott, Hannah Simone	Jake Bugg	
473	"Font Wars: Helvetica vs. Calibri Part 3"	October 2, 2013	CeeLo Green, Stephen Merchant	Goodie Mob	
474	"A Word-for-Word Re-Enactment of This Afternoon's Queen Latifah Episode"	October 3, 2013	Jerry O'Connell, Lauren Cohan	Erin Foley	
475	"Aaron Aaronson and the First-in-the-Phonebook Caper"	October 14, 2013	Steven Yeun, Eric André	Aparna Nancherla	
476	"The Dog Who Had the Opportunity to Lick Itself But Politely Declined"	October 15, 2013	Rebel Wilson, Samantha Gordon	Jake Owen	
477	"Throwing Shade Since 1993"	October 16, 2013	Ke$ha, Jesse Bering	Fitz and the Tantrums	
478	"[Tonight's Episode] Is Not in Right Now. Please Leave a Message After the Theme."	October 17, 2013	Jared Leto, Kaitlin Olson, Dave "Gruber" Allen as Pope Francis	Ricky Skaggs and Bruce Hornsby	
479	"Of Mice and Men and Their Mutant Offspring, Mice-Men"	October 21, 2013	Ethan Hawke, Pete Holmes	Tedeschi Trucks Band	
480	"The Asian Guy Who Actually Appreciated That 'Good at Math' Stereotype"	October 22, 2013	Michael C. Hall, Jeb Corliss	Sam Simmons	
481	"The Westboro Baptist Church's Surprisingly Moving Stage Version of 'Brokeback Mountain'"	October 23, 2013	Anna Faris, Jackson Nicoll	Okkervil River	
482	"Microwaving Fish at Work is a War Crime"	October 24, 2013	Megan Mullally, Adam DeVine	Lindsey Stirling	
483	"Please Wait While Your Show Title is Being Processed"	October 28, 2013	Steven Wright	N/A	
484	"Two Decades, Two Laughs"	October 29, 2013	Queen Latifah, Asa Butterfield	N/A	
485	"A Night of 1000 Laughs and 11 Deafening Silences"	October 30, 2013	Johnny Knoxville, Casey Wilson	Queens of the Stone Age	
486	"That Spooky Night They Ignored Halloween and Showed Clips from the Last 20 Years"	October 31, 2013	Rachel McAdams, Norman Reedus	N/A	

=== November ===
No.	Title	Original release date	Guest(s)	Musical/entertainment guest(s)	Ref.
487	"CDLXXXVII for My Roman Peeps"	November 4, 2013	Kevin Kline, Brie Larson	King Krule	
488	"The Aqua-Boy Who Cried 'Squid!'"	November 5, 2013	Shane Victorino and Jonny Gomes, Artie Lange	Johnny Marr	
489	"What Happens in Vegas Stays in Your Bloodstream and Eventually Spreads to Your Wife"	November 6, 2013	Aziz Ansari, Deepak Chopra	Adam Yenser	
490	"Less Rock, More Talk"	November 7, 2013	Chris Hemsworth, Marc Maron	Gavin DeGraw	
491	"I Know Why the Caged Bird Sings: He Made a Deal with the D.A."	November 11, 2013	Jon Cryer, Chris Hadfield	Avril Lavigne	
492	"The Vegan Zombie Who Only Ate Brainfurky"	November 12, 2013	Dax Shepard, Regina Hall	Sean Patton	
493	"In the Kingdom of the Blind, I Don't Have to Wear Pants"	November 13, 2013	Will Arnett, Jim Gaffigan	M.I.A.	
494	"James and the Giant Peach Test the Limits of Unconventional Love"	November 14, 2013	Melissa McCarthy and Billy Gardell, Chris Elliott	Yuna	
495	"That Which Doesn't Kill You Will Regroup and Try Again Tomorrow"	November 18, 2013	Eric Stonestreet, David Morrissey	Reggie Watts	
496	"Tony Danza's Incredibly Inaccurate Book About Feudal Japan"	November 19, 2013	Paulina Rubio and Simon Cowell, Jimmy Pardo	Lissie	
497	"You'd Look Good in Burgundy, But Burgundy Would Look Better in You"	November 20, 2013	Ron Burgundy	Jessie Ware	
498	"The One Where Andy Goes Full-On Rob Ford"	November 21, 2013	James Franco, Neal McDonough	Nicki Bluhm and the Gramblers	

=== December ===
No.	Title	Original release date	Guest(s)	Musical/entertainment guest(s)	Ref.
499	"I Scream, You Scream, We All Scream Because There is a Murderer on the Loose"	December 2, 2013	Casey Affleck, Chris D'Elia	Jay Larson	
500	"The 'I'm Too Sexy for My Shirt' Guy Rethinks His Position"	December 3, 2013	Will Forte, Felicity Jones	Dawes	
501	"Dreidel, Dreidel, Dreidel, I Made It Out of Thermoplastic High Density Polypropylene"	December 4, 2013	Ben Stiller, Evangeline Lilly	The Wild Feathers	
502	"All the President's 'Meh'"	December 5, 2013	Jim Parsons, Steve Coogan	Daniel Sloss	
503	"The Surprisingly Peaceful Life of Steve Violent"	December 9, 2013	Snoop Dogg, Mike Birbiglia	7 Days of Funk with Snoopzilla and Dâm-Funk	
504	"'Tis the Season to Use the Word 'Tis"	December 10, 2013	Jason Schwartzman, Columbus Short	Pentatonix	
505	"The Typo That Saved Christmaf"	December 11, 2013	Benedict Cumberbatch, George Takei	John Legend	
506	"'Twas the Fortnight Minus One Night Before Christmas"	December 12, 2013	Adam Levine, Tim Conway	Lee Ranaldo and the Dust	
507	"Santa's Undocumented Helpers"	December 16, 2013	Jesse Tyler Ferguson, Barkhad Abdi	Tom Papa	
508	"If Visions of Sugarplums Last More Than 4 Hours, Please Call Your Physician"	December 17, 2013	Tom Hanks	The Head and the Heart	
509	"Gold, Frankincense and Murder"	December 18, 2013	Jennifer Lawrence, Bob Odenkirk	Bad Religion	
510	"Agnostic Santa and the Secular Humanist Christmas"	December 19, 2013	Christina Applegate, Skylar Astin	Young the Giant	

== Notes ==
^{A} Paramore was the musical guest scheduled to appear on April 30, 2013. The band's appearance was cancelled shortly before the taping of the show due to lead singer Hayley Williams' illness.
