= List of Conan episodes (2010–11) =

Conan
- No. of episodes: 28 (2010); 161 (2011)

Release
- Original network: TBS
- Original release: November 8, 2010 – December 22, 2011

Season chronology
- ← Previous Next → 2012 episodes

This list of episodes of Conan details information on the episodes spanning from 2010–2011, of Conan, a television program on TBS hosted by Conan O'Brien. A week of shows were taped at the Beacon Theatre in New York City during October 31—November 3, 2011.

== 2010 ==
=== November ===
No.	Title	Original release date	Guest(s)	Musical/entertainment guest(s)	Ref.
1	"Baa Baa Blackmail"	November 8, 2010	Seth Rogen, Lea Michele	Jack White	
2	"Murder, She Tweeted"	November 9, 2010	Tom Hanks, Jack McBrayer	Soundgarden	
3	"Dead Men Don't Wear Spanx"	November 10, 2010	Jon Hamm, Charlyne Yi	Fistful of Mercy with Tom Morello	
4	"The Mummenschantz Conundrum"	November 11, 2010	Michael Cera, Julie Bowen	Jon Dore	
5	"Hickory Dickory Danger"	November 15, 2010	LL Cool J, B. J. Novak	Sharon Jones & The Dap-Kings	
6	"A Fistful of Chowder"	November 16, 2010	Harrison Ford, Rosario Dawson	Reggie Watts	
7	"The Equinox Equinox"	November 17, 2010	Russell Brand, Susan Casey	The 88	
8	"Heavy Hangs the Fannypack"	November 18, 2010	Jesse Eisenberg, Venus Williams	The Decemberists with Gillian Welch	
9	"A Prayer for Dick Butkus"	November 22, 2010	Christina Aguilera, Zachary Levi	Christina Aguilera	
10	"Wanted: Dead… Or with Chives"	November 23, 2010	Christina Applegate, Jesse Tyler Ferguson	Maroon 5	
11	"One Fish, Two Fish, Red Fish, Dead Fish"	November 24, 2010	Eva Mendes, Bob Saget	Neon Trees	
12	"The Turducken Kerfuffle"	November 25, 2010	Jim Parsons, Marisa Miller	Brendon Walsh	
13	"What the Rowboat Saw"	November 29, 2010	George Lopez, Chris Colfer	Kid Cudi	
14	"Satan's Kazoo"	November 30, 2010	Charles Barkley, Drew Pinsky	Bo Burnham	

=== December ===
No.	Title	Original release date	Guest(s)	Musical/entertainment guest(s)	Ref.
15	"Paper or Plastique?"	December 1, 2010	Joel McHale, Tim Gunn	Cake	
16	"A Jeff Bridges Too Far"	December 2, 2010	Kourtney, Kim, and Khloé Kardashian; Kevin Nealon	Deerhunter	
17	"One If by Land, Two If by a Slightly Longer Land-Route"	December 6, 2010	Nicole Kidman, Charlie Day	Lauren Pritchard	
18	"No Time for Tetherball"	December 7, 2010	Rainn Wilson, Roberta Mancino	Christina Perri	
19	"Do You Want Lies with That?"	December 8, 2010	Ray Romano, Arianna Huffington	The Legion of Extraordinary Dancers	
20	"Zeus Was Framed"	December 9, 2010	Sarah Silverman, Michio Kaku	She & Him	
21	"The El Chapo Cartel Saves Christmas"	December 13, 2010	Gwyneth Paltrow, T. J. Miller	Jimmy Eat World	
22	"A Sleigh Full of Slay"	December 14, 2010	Seth Green, Tim Meadows	Broken Bells	
23	"How the Grinch Stole Innocence"	December 15, 2010	Amy Adams, Roger Waters	Edward Sharpe and the Magnetic Zeros	
24	"Hairdryer: 1, Frosty: 0"	December 16, 2010	Mark Wahlberg, Charles Phoenix	Jenny and Johnny	
25	"Fa-La-La-La-La, La-La-La-Murder"	December 20, 2010	Aaron Eckhart, Mary Lynn Rajskub	Beach House	
26	"A Quantum of Kwanzaa"	December 21, 2010	Kevin Spacey, Kristen Schaal	Los Lobos	
27	"The Mistletoe Manifesto"	December 22, 2010	Jack Black, Erika Nelson	Jimmie Vaughan	
28	"Santa vs. Rudolph vs. Predator"	December 23, 2010	Jason Segel, Shane Smith	Reggie Watts	

== 2011 ==
=== January ===
No.	Title	Original release date	Guest(s)	Musical/entertainment guest(s)	Ref.
29	"2011: A Spanx Odyssey"	January 10, 2011	Adam Sandler, Donald Glover	Guster	
30	"Return to Devil's Condo"	January 11, 2011	Javier Bardem, Rashida Jones	Steel Train	
31	"Voodoo or Voo Don't"	January 12, 2011	Denis Leary, Ice Cube	Tim Minchin	
32	"The Monkey's Paw and Then the Rest of the Monkey"	January 13, 2011	Ricky Gervais, Kaitlin Olson	Cheap Trick	
33	"Houston, We Have a Murder"	January 17, 2011	Cameron Diaz, Dax Shepard	My Chemical Romance	
34	"A Fistful of Dollars, a Mouthful of Travelers Cheques"	January 18, 2011	Jennifer Garner, Gabriel Iglesias	Social Distortion	
35	"The Conundrum Enigma"	January 19, 2011	Natalie Portman, Chris Pratt	Keyshia Cole	
36	"Damn the Torpedoes, Full Greed Ahead"	January 20, 2011	William H. Macy, Marc Maron	Aloe Blacc	
37	"Hello and Dubai"	January 24, 2011	Larry King, Shaun White	Iron & Wine	
38	"Something Smelly That Way Went"	January 25, 2011	Steven Ho, Patton Oswalt	Wanda Jackson	
39	"You Say Tomato, I Also Say Tomato"	January 26, 2011	Jon Cryer, Nick Thune	Motörhead	
40	"A Renaissance Most Foul"	January 27, 2011	Jane Lynch, Joe Buck	The Ghost of a Saber Tooth Tiger	
41	"Who Will Cry for the Third Nipple?"	January 31, 2011	Amy Poehler, Tim Heidecker and Eric Wareheim	Randy Rogers Band	

=== February ===
No.	Title	Original release date	Guest(s)	Musical/entertainment guest(s)	Ref.
42	"A Finger Un-Pulled"	February 1, 2011	Jennifer Aniston, Nick Offerman	Peter Bjorn and John	
43	"Rendezvous at Meet-Up Point"	February 2, 2011	Kobe Bryant, Camilla Belle	Jamie Kilstein	
44	"Do Not Go Gentle Into That Good Humor Truck"	February 3, 2011	Lisa Kudrow, Mike O'Malley	Interpol	
45	"'Whisper,' She Shouted"	February 7, 2011	Jeff Bridges, Nick Swardson	Far East Movement	
46	"The Unitard Dilemma"	February 8, 2011	Craig Ferguson, Kevin Hart	Red	
47	"Octoparrot vs. Megakitten"	February 9, 2011	50 Cent, Chris Elliott	Ray LaMontagne	
48	"Death Takes a Time-Share"	February 10, 2011	Seth MacFarlane, Brooklyn Decker	Dana Gould	
49	"Beware the Gerbil"	February 14, 2011	Justin Bieber, Claire Smith	The Black Keys	
50	"How Stella Got Her Car Back"	February 15, 2011	Phil McGraw, Ginnifer Goodwin	Cast of Jump City: Seattle	
51	"The Asiago Index"	February 16, 2011	Martin Lawrence, Fred Armisen	Reggie Watts	
52	"The Devil's Email Attachment"	February 17, 2011	Martin Short, Chris Bosh	Nicole Atkins	
53	"Air Force One 2: Revenge of President Dracula"	February 21, 2011	Ed Helms, Carmelo Anthony	Chromeo	
54	"If This Van's a Rockin', I'm Having a Seizure Inside My Van"	February 22, 2011	Matthew Perry, The Situation	Jason Aldean	
55	"Hooray for Scabies"	February 23, 2011	Jason Sudeikis, Brandon T. Jackson	G. Love	
56	"The Case of the Missing Show Title"	February 24, 2011	Cory Monteith, Stephen Merchant	Kumail Nanjiani	
57	"The Double-Fudging of Vanessa del Rio"	February 28, 2011	Marisa Tomei, Harland Williams	Fitz and the Tantrums	

=== March ===
No.	Title	Original release date	Guest(s)	Musical/entertainment guest(s)	Ref.
58	"World War Wheeee!"	March 1, 2011	Piers Morgan, Emmy Rossum	Nick Griffin	
59	"A Mystery Wrapped Inside a Calzone"	March 2, 2011	Chelsea Handler, Anthony Mackie	Mavis Staples	
60	"The Rise and Fall of John Reisenphal"	March 3, 2011	Emily Blunt, Martha Stewart	Taio Cruz	
61	"Captain Facepunch vs. the Punch-Proof Face!"	March 7, 2011	Seth Green, Jayma Mays	Travis Barker	
62	"Seven Salads for Seven Brothers Who Are Sexually Attracted to Salads"	March 8, 2011	Nigel Marven, Gary Oldman	Drive-By Truckers	
63	"Everybody Wang but Don't Chung Tonight"	March 9, 2011	Pee-wee Herman, Edmund Morris	Shane Mauss	
64	"Excuse Me, But May I Murder You?"	March 10, 2011	Seth Rogen, Brittany Snow	Lykke Li	
65	"Ninjas Don't Wear Corduroy"	March 21, 2011	Sarah Silverman, Biz Stone	Pete Holmes	
66	"The Spatula Peninsula"	March 22, 2011	Eric Stonestreet, Ellie Kemper	Teddy Thompson	
67	"And in This Corner… Gingivitis!"	March 23, 2011	Vanessa Hudgens, The Miz	Grace Potter and the Nocturnals	
68	"The Lion, the Witch, and the IKEA Aspelund Underbed Storage Box"	March 28, 2011	Jake Gyllenhaal, Randy Jackson	Panic! at the Disco	
69	"Hell's Cul-de-sac"	March 29, 2011	Paul Giamatti, Olivia Munn	Little Big Town	
70	"Terra Chips at 30,000 Feet"	March 30, 2011	Greg Kinnear, Steve Schirripa	Mo Mandel	
71	"Where There's a Will, There's a Dead Person"	March 31, 2011	Johnny Knoxville, Kaley Cuoco	Thompson Square	

=== April ===
No.	Title	Original release date	Guest(s)	Musical/entertainment guest(s)	Ref.
72	"Countdown to Crotchfire"	April 4, 2011	Russell Brand, Khloé Kardashian	Roy Wood Jr.	
73	"Grandpa's Secret, Grandma's Shame"	April 5, 2011	Tracy Morgan, Charlyne Yi	Infantree	
74	"As Time Goes Bi-Curious"	April 6, 2011	Danny McBride, Jeremy Wade	OneRepublic	
75	"Ding Dong the Witch Is Dad"	April 7, 2011	Jack McBrayer, Colin Quinn	Hanson	
76	"A Man for 3 Out of 4 Seasons"	April 11, 2011	Chris O'Donnell, Lil Jon	PJ Harvey	
77	"The Candy Man Can't"	April 12, 2011	Gordon Ramsay, Hayden Panettiere	Ryan Stout	
78	"The Devil's Pre-Nup"	April 13, 2011	Dax Shepard, Anthony Anderson	The Kills	
79	"Dr. No, M.D."	April 14, 2011	Matthew Morrison, Alexis Bledel	Queens of the Stone Age	
80	"On This Day, a Chump Was Born"	April 18, 2011	Emma Roberts, Damon Wayans Jr.	Scala & Kolacny Brothers	
81	"Dial T for Misdialed Murder"	April 19, 2011	Tina Fey, Sanjay Gupta	Plan B	
82	"The Boy Who Actually Used Algebra Later in Life"	April 20, 2011	Tyler Perry, Morgan Spurlock	The Strokes	
83	"The Brobdingnagian Abyssinian"	April 21, 2011	Reese Witherspoon, Joseph Gordon-Levitt	The Head and the Heart	

=== May ===
No.	Title	Original release date	Guest(s)	Musical/entertainment guest(s)	Ref.
84	"Redbeard's Last Stand"	May 2, 2011	Will Ferrell, Paul Bettany	James Blunt	
85	"The Container Store of My Discontent"	May 3, 2011	Steve Martin, Atticus Shaffer	Steve Martin	
86	"The Twin Horrors of Professor Blurryvision"	May 4, 2011	Eva Mendes, Dan Dunn	The Belle Brigade	
87	"The Umlaut Initiätive"	May 5, 2011	John Krasinski, Blake Griffin	Ian Edwards	
88	"Typo Mysteries Presents: The Haunted Hose"	May 9, 2011	Demetri Martin, Kat Dennings	Amos Lee	
89	"The Awkward Product Placement. Swiffer"	May 10, 2011	Zach Braff, Judd Apatow	Al Madrigal	
90	"Untitled Freddie Prinze Jr. Project"	May 11, 2011	Jon Hamm, Miranda Kerr, Kesha^{[A]}	TBA	
91	"The Falcon Can Hear the Falconer, Thanks to Miracle Ear!"	May 12, 2011	Magic Johnson, Maggie Q	Jen Kirkman	
92	"The Indiscriminate Highlighter"	May 16, 2011	Zach Galifianakis, Sig Hansen	Raphael Saadiq	
93	"Fuzzy Wuzzy, or Fuzzy Wuzzn't He?"	May 17, 2011	Norm Macdonald, Todd Phillips	The Joy Formidable	
94	"Tomorrow's Episode"	May 18, 2011	Bradley Cooper, Chris O'Dowd	Ryan Hamilton	
95	"Murder at the Murder Trial"	May 23, 2011	Ken Jeong, Rebel Wilson	Yeasayer	
96	"Mr. Smith Goes to Hades"	May 24, 2011	Topher Grace, Melissa McCarthy	Beardyman	
97	"Willy Wonka and His Much Less Popular Beef Jerky Factory"	May 25, 2011	Dave Salmoni, Kevin Nealon	Ben Harper	
98	"Do Not Go Gentle Into That Pink Berry"	May 26, 2011	Dana Carvey, Mike Zohn and Evan Michelson	Tinie Tempah	

=== June ===
No.	Title	Original release date	Guest(s)	Musical/entertainment guest(s)	Ref.
99	"Quoth the Raven, 'No Comment'"	June 6, 2011	Ice-T, Breckin Meyer	Flogging Molly	
100	"Green Eggs and Health Code Violations"	June 7, 2011	Flavor Flav, Curtis Stone	Tim Minchin	
101	"Is Anyone Paying Attention to These Friggin' Episode Titles?"	June 8, 2011	Steven Ho, Peter Sarsgaard	Death Cab for Cutie	
102	"Wow! You Do Care About These Episode Titles."	June 9, 2011	George Lopez, Gary "Baba Booey" Dell'Abate	Jessie and the Toy Boys	
103	"Savage. Fred Savage."	June 13, 2011	Noah Wyle, Riley Griffiths	Anthony Jeselnik	
104	"She Sells Sea Shells Made Out of Rubber Baby Buggy Bumpers"	June 14, 2011	Jeff Garlin, Sarah Vowell	The Airborne Toxic Event	
105	"It's Getting Hard Out There for a Pope"	June 15, 2011	Tom Arnold, Mike Birbiglia	Redlight King	
106	"The Title Will Be Added in Later"	June 16, 2011	Ryan Reynolds, Simon Pegg	Kyle Kinane	
107	"Quoth the Hipster, 'Whatevermore.'"	June 20, 2011	Neil Patrick Harris, Emily Mortimer	Tom Segura	
108	"A Recipe for Disaster Casserole"	June 21, 2011	Larry the Cable Guy, Cat Deeley	Reggie Watts	
109	"Me. Coli"	June 22, 2011	Gabourey Sidibe, Rob Corddry	Alison Krauss and Union Station with Jerry Douglas	
110	"What Happens on Krypton, Stays on Krypton"	June 23, 2011	Adam Levine, Nick Kroll	My Morning Jacket	
111	"Are You There, God? It's Me—Your Loanshark"	June 27, 2011	Jason Sudeikis, DJ Qualls	Kesha	
112	"Dragonpuncher 3: The Punchening"	June 28, 2011	Elijah Wood, Leslie Bibb	Gillian Welch	
113	"An Atheist Named Faith"	June 29, 2011	Liv Tyler, Mark-Paul Gosselaar	Jon Dore with Rory Scovel	
114	"50,000,000 Connie Selleca Fans Can't Be Wrong"	June 30, 2011	Tom Hanks	Myron Mixon	

=== July ===
No.	Title	Original release date	Guest(s)	Musical/entertainment guest(s)	Ref.
115	"Death Gets a Paper Cut"	July 18, 2011	Bryan Cranston, Chris Hardwick	Edward Sharpe and the Magnetic Zeros	
116	"Length × Width = Tears"	July 19, 2011	Seth Green, Marc Maron	Tedeschi Trucks Band	
117	"Hell Hath No Cell Phone Reception"	July 20, 2011	Justin Timberlake, Jon Ronson	Myq Kaplan	
118	"One Fish, Two Fish, Red Fish—Oh, God, My Whole Life Has Been a Horrible Lie"	July 21, 2011	Lisa Kudrow, Rhett McLaughlin & Link Neal	Nate Bargatze^{[B]}	
119	"Hug Me, Sighed the Porcupine"	July 25, 2011	Emma Stone, Jon Benjamin	KT Tunstall	
120	"The Devil Went Down to 7-Eleven and Bought a Slurpee"	July 26, 2011	Adrian Grenier, Tom Felton	Steve Byrne	
121	"The One Where Conan Does That Thing"	July 27, 2011	Kevin Connolly, Jeff Lewis	Funeral Party	
122	"The LOL from Hell O Hell"	July 28, 2011	Jon Favreau, Jayma Mays	Brett Dennen	

=== August ===
No.	Title	Original release date	Guest(s)	Musical/entertainment guest(s)	Ref.
123	"The Silvery Thistles of St. Lispmoor"	August 1, 2011	Harrison Ford, Marisa Miller	Pitbull	
124	"Cut, Cap, Balance, and Boogie"	August 2, 2011	Shaquille O'Neal, Brian Posehn	Seether	
125	"The Gentile's Bar Mitzvah"	August 3, 2011	Olivia Wilde, Novak Djokovic	Russell Howard	
126	"I Know Why the Caged Bird Sings Karaoke"	August 4, 2011	Jason Bateman, Noah Ringer	Ron Funches	
127	"Cowboys and Aliens 2: Showdown at Glorb Ranch"	August 8, 2011	Piers Morgan, J. B. Smoove, Steve Zampanides^{[C]}	Imelda May	
128	"And the Wind Whispered 'Balls'"	August 9, 2011	James Franco, Nick Swardson	Steve Zampanides^{[C]}	
129	"What If the Title's Too Long for Andy to Successfully Fit It in to the Opening Announce?"	August 10, 2011	Aziz Ansari, The Situation, Steve Zampanides^{[C]}	Nate Bargatze	
130	"I Scream, You Scream, We All Scream When Our Elevator Plunges 40 Floors"	August 11, 2011	Denis Leary, Sheamus, Steve Zampanides^{[C]}	Keb' Mo'	
131	"The Decline of Dee Klein"	August 15, 2011	Kathy Griffin, Christopher Mintz-Plasse, Steve Zampanides^{[C]}	Trombone Shorty and Orleans Avenue	
132	"The Dr. and Mrs. Howard P. Reynolds Foundation Murders"	August 16, 2011	Anne Hathaway, Jason Momoa, Steve Zampanides^{[C]}	Sean O'Connor	
133	"The Devil Drives Stick"	August 17, 2011	Paul Rudd, Jessica Chastain, Steve Zampanides^{[C]}	Vanessa Carlton	
134	"Dragon Tamer 3: Dungeon War 2: The Prequel"	August 18, 2011	Louis C.K., Jim Sturgess, Steve Zampanides^{[C]}	Hugh Moore	

=== September ===
No.	Title	Original release date	Guest(s)	Musical/entertainment guest(s)	Ref.
135	"Tinker, Tailor, Soldier, Rabbi"	September 6, 2011	Kevin Nealon, Aubrey Plaza	Lindsey Buckingham	
136	"I Know What You Did Last Lobsterfest"	September 7, 2011	Don Johnson, Busy Philipps	Band of Horses	
137	"Eat, Love, Lather, Rinse, Repeat"	September 8, 2011	Charlie Day, Dave Grohl and Taylor Hawkins^{[D]}	Foo Fighters	
138	"Alex Trebek in Actual Jeopardy"	September 12, 2011	Howie Mandel, Floyd Mayweather Jr.	Alex Ebert	
139	"The Title the Announcer Didn't Read Right"	September 13, 2011	Roseanne Barr, Paul "Pauly D" DelVecchio	Baron Vaughn	
140	"A Streetcar Named Dr. Nathan Gluckman"	September 14, 2011	Tyra Banks, Glenn Howerton	Sklar Brothers	
141	"And the Wind Cried, 'Harriet.'"	September 15, 2011	Ashton Kutcher, Jeb Corliss	Foo Fighters with Bob Mould	
142	"The One Hour of Footage George Lucas Hasn't Messed With"	September 19, 2011	Ryan Gosling, Nicole Scherzinger	Tig Notaro	
143	"Quoth the Raven, 'That Is So Me!'"	September 20, 2011	Simon Baker, Bryce Dallas Howard	Matt Nathanson	
144	"President Björk Saves the Day"	September 21, 2011	Jim Parsons, Chris Pratt	Grouplove	
145	"The Murdering Murderer of Murdertown"	September 22, 2011	Jonah Hill, John Noble	TBA	
146	"The Hunchback of Dekalb County Community College"	September 26, 2011	Taylor Lautner, Kevin Hart	Neal Brennan	
147	"The Fluffer of Seville"	September 27, 2011	Marisa Tomei, Casey Wilson	Joe Mande	
148	"The Day the Proofradar Quit"	September 28, 2011	Seth Rogen, Kid Cudi	Daryl Hall	
149	"It Turns Out Stella's Groove Was on Her Head the Whole Time"	September 29, 2011	Patton Oswalt, Mykel Hawke, and Ruth England	Portugal. The Man	

=== October ===
No.	Title	Original release date	Guest(s)	Musical/entertainment guest(s)	Ref.
150	"God Never Closes a Door Without Laughing at You"	October 10, 2011	Ty Burrell, Jillian Michaels	Ryan Adams	
151	"The Way to a Man's Heart Is Through My Multi-Level Marketing Plan"	October 11, 2011	Will Arnett, Deepak Chopra	Brent Weinbach	
152	"Death Takes a Staycation"	October 12, 2011	Steven Ho, Michael C. Hall	Gary Gulman	
153	"The Girl with the Dragon Tattoo on Her Face Who Was Unemployable"	October 13, 2011	Sarah Michelle Gellar, Simon Helberg	Dropkick Murphys	
154	"The Day the Mirth Stood Still"	October 17, 2011	Kaley Cuoco, Drew Pinsky	Mayer Hawthorne	
155	"Alibi for the Murder Andy's Committing Tonight"	October 18, 2011	Ray Liotta, José Andrés	Tommy Johnagin	
156	"Karate Kid 9: Return to Nun-chuk Island"	October 19, 2011	Tom Selleck, Julianne Hough	All Time Low	
157	"The Pretty Girl Waving to Someone Behind You"	October 20, 2011	Jesse Tyler Ferguson, Steve Harvey	Amy Schumer	
158	"Footloose 3: Footloosest"	October 24, 2011	Chris Colfer, Charlyne Yi	Matt Braunger	
159	"The Zombie Who Preferred Salads"	October 25, 2011	Zach Galifianakis, Aaron Paul	Switchfoot	
160	"Enter the Enterer"	October 26, 2011	Jane Lynch, Paul Scheer	Allen Stone	
161	"The Unbearable Lightness of Light Beer"	October 27, 2011	Hugh Laurie, Kari Byron	T. J. Miller	
162	"It's the Great Pumpki—, No Wait, That's Just Conan's Head"	October 31, 2011	Jimmy Fallon	Reggie Watts	

=== November ===
No.	Title	Original release date	Guest(s)	Musical/entertainment guest(s)	Ref.
163	"A Tree with Dutch Elm Disease Grows in Brooklyn"	November 1, 2011	Hugh Jackman	Cobra Starship with Sabi	
164	"The Mystery of the Recent NYU Grad Who Got a Job"	November 2, 2011	Matthew Broderick	Paul Simon	
165	"Just Another Typical Gay Jewish Televised Wedding in New York"	November 3, 2011	Louis C.K.; Triumph the Insult Comic Dog; Scott Cronick and David Gorshein^{[E]}	TBA	
166	"The Announcer Who Died at the End of the Announcement"	November 7, 2011	Adam Sandler, Christina Tosi	Joe Jonas	
167	"Happy One Year Anniversary to Us, and to Lisa and Greg Drucker of Wayne, New Jersey"	November 8, 2011	Julie Bowen, Travis Rice	Maria Bamford	
168	"Mime Riot"	November 9, 2011	Joel McHale, Cheryl Hines	Jesse Popp	
169	"The Illiterate Merderer"	November 10, 2011	Kirsten Dunst, Chris Hardwick	Mariachi El Bronx	
170	"The Postman Always Rings Ten Times. What's His Problem?"	November 14, 2011	LL Cool J, Greyson MacLean	Christian Finnegan	
171	"Dead Men Tell No Amusing Anecdotes"	November 15, 2011	Jeff Goldblum, Adam Scott	Childish Gambino	
172	"Siri Shows Her Boobs"	November 16, 2011	Snooki, Rob Riggle	Pegi Young and The Survivors	
173	"A Man for All Flu Seasons"	November 17, 2011	Kristen Stewart, Jimmy Pardo	Pete Holmes	
174	"Friends, Romans, Countrymen, Lend Me Your DVDs of 'Breaking Bad' Season 3"	November 28, 2011	Jason Segel, Shaun-T	Das Racist	
175	"What Happens in Vegas Is Typically Pretty Sad"	November 29, 2011	Nathan Fillion, Angela Kinsey	Morrissey	
176	"Bye-Bye, Albino's Alibi"	November 30, 2011	Claire Danes, Nick Kroll	Michael Kosta	

=== December ===
No.	Title	Original release date	Guest(s)	Musical/entertainment guest(s)	Ref.
177	"Indiana Jones and the Temple of Wait, This Isn't a Temple, It's a Walmart!"	December 1, 2011	Zooey Deschanel, Harland Williams	Laurie Kilmartin	
178	"The Bourne Ultimate Frisbee Tournament"	December 5, 2011	Alec Baldwin, Damon Wayans Jr.	Yelawolf with Travis Barker	
179	"What the Butler Smelled"	December 6, 2011	Sofía Vergara, Paul F. Tompkins	Tig Notaro	
180	"Tell My Wife I Love Her and Tell My Secret Wife I Love Her Even More"	December 7, 2011	Michael Moore, Ellie Kemper	Sean Patton	
181	"Armageddon Comes to Quiznos"	December 8, 2011	Jeremy Piven, The Miz	Blink-182	
182	"Return to A-Hole Acres"	December 12, 2011	Rob Lowe, Donald Faison	Noel Gallagher's High Flying Birds	
—	"The 'Conan' One Hour Earlier Best of Spectacular"	December 13, 2011	Compilation special	TBA	
183	"It's a Wonderful Life Because of the Internet"	December 13, 2011	Bob Costas, Nick Frost	Nick Vatterott	
184	"Miracle Whip on 34th Street"	December 14, 2011	Christoph Waltz, Mike Zohn and Evan Michelson	Deer Tick	
185	"The Island of Misfit Roys: Scheider Edition!"	December 15, 2011	Dax Shepard, Kunal Nayyar	Dawes	
186	"Santa Claus Is Coming to Town, But Only to Visit His Mistress Danielle"	December 19, 2011	Seth MacFarlane, Elle Fanning	The Klezmatics	
187	"Happy Chanukah—I Mean, Hanukah—I Mean, Hanukkah"	December 20, 2011	Patton Oswalt, Kevin Lee	Joe Mande	
188	"The Stockings Were Hung—To Send a Message to the Other Stockings"	December 21, 2011	Charles Barkley, Marc Maron	John Pizzarelli	
189	"Christmas Eve Not Christmas Steve"	December 22, 2011	Thomas Haden Church, Claire Smith	Glen Campbell	

== Notes ==
^{A} Although she was billed in the opening sequence of the May 11, 2011 show as the musical guest, Kesha did not perform; rather, she made an appearance as a traditional guest.
^{B} Nate Bargatze's scheduled appearance on July 21, 2011 was cancelled. He instead performed on August 10, 2011.
^{C} In the opening of multiple episodes in August 2011, Steve Zampanides was listed as a guest to appear in the broadcast, but in all instances his appearance was delayed to the next episode, supposedly due to time limitations. In the beginning of the episodes, he is billed as having a different unusual skill, such as "font expert" and "shark whisperer". His name did not appear on the weekly schedules posted on the official website of the show and no promotional links that referenced him were provided; given this information, there is no indication that he was ever intended to be an actual guest or is even an actual person.
^{D} Although they only constitute part of the band, Dave Grohl and Taylor Hawkins were billed in the opening sequence as the Foo Fighters. Later they performed, along with the rest of the band, as the musical guests.
^{E} On the November 3, 2011 show, Triumph the Insult Comic Dog was billed in the opening sequence as a guest to appear on the show. While the character did make an appearance on the show, he did so only in a video segment and in a cameo appearance during the filming of the show; he did not make a traditional guest appearance. Additionally, Scott Cronick and David Gorshein were billed under the event "The Wedding of Scott and David" and their wedding took place during the traditional musical or entertainment guest segment of the show.
