= List of Conan episodes (2012) =

Conan
- No. of episodes: 161

Release
- Original network: TBS
- Original release: January 3 – December 20, 2012

Season chronology
- ← Previous; 2010–11 episodes Next → 2013 episodes

This list of episodes of Conan details information on the 2012 episodes of Conan, a television program on TBS hosted by Conan O'Brien. Between June 11–14, the show was taped at the Chicago Theatre in Chicago, Illinois.

== 2012 ==
=== January ===
No.	Title	Original release date	Guest(s)	Musical/entertainment guest(s)	Ref.
190	"May Old Acquaintances Be De-Friended"	January 3, 2012	Gary Oldman, Judy Greer	Everlast	
191	"Out with the Old, In with the Hastily Re-Painted Old"	January 4, 2012	Emmy Rossum, Dave Attell	Chris Isaak	
192	"Manuary 5th—The Day of the Dude"	January 5, 2012	Johnny Galecki, Mindy Kaling	Tom Papa	
193	"Oh My God, Baby New Year Got Into the Medicine Cabinet!"	January 9, 2012	Seth Green, David Cross	Gavin DeGraw	
194	"Every Kiss Begins with Kay, But Everything Else Begins with K-Y"	January 10, 2012	Chelsea Handler, Billy Eichner	Doyle and Debbie	
195	"The Integrity Episode, Brought to You by Pall Mall Cigarettes"	January 11, 2012	Jack McBrayer, Justin Verlander	Dwayne Perkins	
196	"The Mime Whisperer"	January 12, 2012	Ricky Gervais, Wladimir Klitschko	James Durbin	
197	"The Mayan 'Dilbert Cartoon-A-Day' Calendar"	January 16, 2012	Kate Beckinsale, Stephen Merchant	St. Vincent	
198	"The Guy Who Actually Went to the Gym He Joined on New Year's Day"	January 17, 2012	Antonio Banderas, Fred Armisen	Blake Mills	
199	"Operation Orgy: Journey to Coitus Cove"	January 18, 2012	Shaun White, Jordan Peele	Sam Adams	
200	"This Episode Would Like You to Join Its LinkedIn Network"	January 19, 2012	Billy Gardell, Gina Carano	Owen Smith	
201	"The Formerly Lesbian Mad Scientist Who Really, Really Experimented in College"	January 23, 2012	Casey Anderson, Morena Baccarin	Wilco	
202	"The Bourne Again Ultimatum"	January 24, 2012	Sam Worthington, Adam Winrich	Julia Nunes	
203	"Mr. Gorbachev, Put Up Some Drapes!"	January 25, 2012	Elizabeth Banks, Timothy Olyphant	John Mulaney	
204	"We Need the Funk, If It's Not Too Much Trouble Would Like to Have That Funk."	January 26, 2012	Cuba Gooding, Jr., Jon Heder	They Might Be Giants	
205	"A Watched Pot Never Boils, and Other Total Lies"	January 30, 2012	Maya Rudolph, Chris Gethard	Dale Earnhardt Jr. Jr.	
206	"The Man Who Got His Money's Worth at Starbucks"	January 31, 2012	Simon Helberg, Chris Kyle	N/A	

=== February ===
No.	Title	Original release date	Guest(s)	Musical/entertainment guest(s)	Ref.
207	"The Dr. Wizard of Dr. Oz"	February 1, 2012	Ringo Starr, Mark "Dr. Bugs" Moffett	Ringo Starr	
208	"Double-Vision Theater Presents: The Lady with Incredible Ta-Ta-Ta-Tas"	February 2, 2012	John Krasinski, Jenny Slate	Evanescence	
209	"The Lonely Scent of a Lean Cuisine"	February 6, 2012	Kristen Bell, Bret McKenzie	John Roy	
210	"'High-Four Me!' Said the Woodshop Teacher"	February 7, 2012	Phil McGraw, Keegan-Michael Key	Alabama Shakes	
211	"The Creature from the Recently Gentrified Lagoon"	February 8, 2012	Martin Short, Jon Bernthal	Dr. Dog	
212	"Cheap Applause from the Best Audience in the World"	February 9, 2012	Carol Burnett, Jon Glaser	Graffiti6	
213	"Mr. Peanut's Peanut Allergy"	February 13, 2012	Ice-T and Coco Austin, Adam Pally	Wale with Miguel	
214	"The Last-Minute Gift at CVS That Got Greg Laid"	February 14, 2012	Reese Witherspoon, RZA	Cast of The Intergalactic Nemesis	
215	"Luck Be a Man Dressed as a Lady Tonight"	February 15, 2012	Tom Arnold, Curt Schilling	Myq Kaplan	
216	"Die Hard 5: Let's Not Die Quite So Hard I've Got Chronic Back Pain"	February 16, 2012	Steve Martin, Rebecca Romijn	Cake	
217	"The 24th Annual Nerf Product Expo"	February 21, 2012	Amanda Seyfried, Andy Lewis and the US Pro Team	fun.	
218	"Justice Has a Middle Name and It's Eric"	February 22, 2012	Jennifer Aniston, Ron and Amy Shirley	Jay Larson	
219	"Annie, Get Your Glock"	February 23, 2012	Kevin Nealon, Mike Epps, Dhani Harrison	N/A	
220	"Death Wish 6: Natural Causes"	February 27, 2012	Artie Lange and Nick DiPaolo, Beth Behrs	Chiddy Bang	
221	"The Douche Who Lost His Bag"	February 28, 2012	Betty White, Ken Marino	Young Jeezy with Ne-Yo	
222	"Godzilla vs. His Own Body Issues"	February 29, 2012	Khloé Kardashian, Jeb Corliss	Matt Knudsen	

=== March ===
No.	Title	Original release date	Guest(s)	Musical/entertainment guest(s)	Ref.
223	"If It Looks Like a Duck and Quacks Like a Duck, It's a Little Person Dressed as a Duck"	March 1, 2012	Steven Ho, Megan Mullally	Mona	
224	"Low-Brow OCD Theater Presents: Pull My Finger 40 Times"	March 5, 2012	Zac Efron, Kirby Bliss Blanton	Joe Louis Walker	
225	"Virginia Is for Lovers, But So Is My Van"	March 6, 2012	Don Cheadle, Elisha Cuthbert	WZRD	
226	"Bridesmaids Revisited"	March 7, 2012	Ed Helms, Melissa Rauch	Kumail Nanjiani	
227	"The Rendezvous with Destiny That Was Pushed Back to April"	March 8, 2012	Jon Hamm, Rob Riggle	Mike Lawrence	
228	"She Maces Me, She Maces Me Not"	March 19, 2012	Ewan McGregor, David Mizejewski	Dana Gould	
229	"Honey, I Shrunk the Show"	March 20, 2012	Shaquille O'Neal, Steve Schirripa	Sharon Van Etten	
230	"The Dark Knight Dies from Rubber Suit Induced Heat Exhaustion"	March 21, 2012	Will Ferrell, Sanjay Gupta	Birdy	
231	"El episodio con el título español"	March 26, 2012	Kristin Chenoweth, Liam Hemsworth	Moshe Kasher	
232	"Godzilla versus Robocalling Mothra"	March 27, 2012	Josh Hutcherson, Simon Pegg	Macy Gray	
233	"That Which Does Not Kill Me Makes Me Think I'm Doing This Suicide Thing Wrong"	March 28, 2012	Dana Carvey, Mayim Bialik	Donovan	
234	"The Lonely Life of Albert Peniseyebrows"	March 29, 2012	Christian Slater, Eliza Coupe	Galactic	

=== April ===
No.	Title	Original release date	Guest(s)	Musical/entertainment guest(s)	Ref.
235	"Early to Bed and Early to Rise Makes a Man Want a Better Shift at Denny's"	April 2, 2012	Neil Patrick Harris, Kate Micucci	Yuna	
236	"Ding Dong! The Witch Is Selling Amway"	April 3, 2012	Mike Tyson, Chris Elliott	Cy Amundson	
237	"Lucy in the Sky with Amazingly Realistic Diamelles"	April 4, 2012	Seann William Scott, Maria Menounos	Heartless Bastards	
238	"The Member of Styx Who Got Laid More When He Stopped Saying He Was a Member of Styx"	April 5, 2012	Aziz Ansari, Christina Hendricks	Good Old War	
239	"Fruit by the Foot, Regret by the Mile"	April 9, 2012	Cory Monteith, Matt Kemp	Tim Minchin	
240	"Flash Mob on the Bounty"	April 10, 2012	Jason Biggs, Phil and Willie Robertson	M. Ward	
241	"Where in Carmen Sandiego Is Waldo?"	April 11, 2012	Larry David, Lena Dunham	Craig Morgan	
242	"How Do I Love Thee? Let Me Google the Ways"	April 12, 2012	Nicole Richie, Jim Gaffigan	Arctic Monkeys	
243	"The Bourne Thingamajigee"	April 16, 2012	Kevin Hart, Brittany Snow	First Aid Kit	
244	"The Doomsday Device (Batteries Not Included)"	April 17, 2012	Patton Oswalt, Gabrielle Union	Bo Burnham	
245	"Nine Hairy Guys in a Hot Tub Built for Five"	April 18, 2012	Sean Hayes, Paul F. Tompkins	Girls	
246	"Extremely Slow Murder on the Orient Local"	April 19, 2012	Kunal Nayyar, Krysten Ritter	Emeli Sandé	
247	"I Believe the Children Are Our Future D-Bags"	April 23, 2012	Kathy Griffin, Morgan Spurlock	Erin Foley	
248	"How Much for That Doggie on the Roof of Your Car?"	April 24, 2012	Simon Helberg, Jerry Crowley	Haley Reinhart	
249	"I Like Big Butts and I Can Still Lie"	April 25, 2012	Julia Louis-Dreyfus, Brian Posehn	Ben Kweller	
250	"What Are You Doing with My Freak On?"	April 26, 2012	Jack Black, Simon Doonan	Ingrid Michaelson	

=== May ===
No.	Title	Original release date	Guest(s)	Musical/entertainment guest(s)	Ref.
251	"The Day the Earth Stood Too Close to the Barbecue"	May 7, 2012	Metta World Peace, Matt Walsh	The Lumineers	
252	"Are All Guys Named Jared Kinda Dicky?"	May 8, 2012	Piers Morgan, Ben Falcone	Ed Sheeran	
253	"Table for Two, Said the Fatman"	May 9, 2012	Joel McHale, Nina Dobrev	Reggie Watts	
254	"Anthony Michael Hall Kidnapped My Family. This Is Not a Show Title. I'm Begging You! Call the Police!"	May 10, 2012	Tom Selleck, Zosia Mamet	The Wombats	
255	"You're Gonna Get Your Ass Tapped in Prison, Charlie Brown"	May 15, 2012	Bill Maher, Gregg Allman	Hannibal Buress	
256	"The Thingy of Finite Imagination"	May 16, 2012	Liam Neeson, Marc Maron	Brody Stevens	
257	"Episode 257: Literally"	May 17, 2012	Wanda Sykes, Brooklyn Decker	Rufus Wainwright	
258	"The Channing Tatum Ultimatum"	May 22, 2012	Tracy Morgan, Bar Refaeli	Trevor Boris	
259	"This One Has a Wardrobe Malfunction"	May 23, 2012	Howie Mandel, Alice Eve	John Ramsey	
260	"The Little Engine That Could, But Held Out for More Money"	May 24, 2012	Josh Brolin, Alison Brie	White Rabbits	

=== June ===
No.	Title	Original release date	Guest(s)	Musical/entertainment guest(s)	Ref.
261	"The Girl Who Said 'It's Not You, It's Me' and Actually Meant It"	June 4, 2012	David Mizejewski, Aaron Paul	Neon Trees	
262	"The Boy with ADD Who… Is That a Butterfly?"	June 5, 2012	Charlize Theron, Curtis Stone	Bahamas	
263	"My Eyes Are Up Here, Archbishop Desmond Tutu!"	June 6, 2012	Jennifer Love Hewitt, Breckin Meyer	JD McPherson	
264	"E-Vite to a Murder"	June 7, 2012	Chris Hemsworth, Malin Åkerman	Jonah Ray	
265	"And the Wind Cries 'Sausage'"	June 11, 2012	Jack McBrayer	Grace Potter and the Nocturnals	
266	"The Devil in the White Suburb"	June 12, 2012	Andy Samberg	Eric Hutchinson	
267	"The Gnocchi from Skokie that Sang Karaoke"	June 13, 2012	Johnny Galecki	Kids These Days	
268	"The Day Lake Michigan Got Renamed What It Should've Been Called in the First Place – Lake Illinois!"	June 14, 2012	Adam Sandler	T.J. Miller	
269	"Four Weddings, a Funeral, and a Bris"	June 18, 2012	Martin Short, Aubrey Plaza	The Spring Standards	
270	"Descartes Presents: Dude, Why's My Car?"	June 19, 2012	Sharon Osbourne, Ashley Fiolek with Jim Fiolek	Chad Daniels	
271	"The Lion, the Witch, and Some Crap from the Container Store"	June 20, 2012	Ben, Craig, Josh, Matt, and Tagg Romney; Rob Corddry	Shinedown	
272	"A Buncha Crap We Came Up with This Afternoon"	June 21, 2012	Seth Meyers, Jordana Brewster	The Avett Brothers	
273	"Godzilla vs. The Board of Education"	June 25, 2012	Mila Kunis, Joel Stein	Rory Scovel	
274	"The House of Usher, and the Cramped Studio Apartment of Sisqó"	June 26, 2012	Russell Brand	Big K.R.I.T.	
275	"John Carter 2: Just Kidding, That Will Never Happen"	June 27, 2012	Chris Pine, Anthony Mackie	El-P with Zola Jesus	
276	"Puss in Ugg Boots"	June 28, 2012	Mark Wahlberg, Billy Eichner	Infantree	

=== July ===
No.	Title	Original release date	Guest(s)	Musical/entertainment guest(s)	Ref.
277	"Dracula Meets the Mummy, and the Two Hit It Off Swimmingly"	July 16, 2012	Denis Leary, Steve Byrne	Cristela Alonzo	
278	"Das Re-Boot: Revenge of the '80s Movie Reference"	July 17, 2012	Elijah Wood, Claire Smith	Kip Moore	
279	"Martin Short Meets Justin Long"	July 18, 2012	Bryan Cranston, Ringling Bros. Dragon Riders with Johnathan Lee Iverson	Walk the Moon	
280	"Slaughterdeath 4: Hurtfest in Scartown"	July 19, 2012	Freida Pinto, Chris Hardwick	Sebastian Maniscalco	
281	"The Quick Case of the Easily Solved Mystery"	July 23, 2012	Kevin Nealon, Ashley Benson	Beth Stelling	
282	"Mission Impossible 5: Flatulence Protocol"	July 24, 2012	Eric McCormack, Eric Andre	The xx	
283	"Are You There, God? It's Me, a Narcissicstic Jerk Who Thinks He Can Talk to God"	July 25, 2012	Kate Beckinsale, Doug Fine	Tennis	
284	"Something Something Japanese"	July 26, 2012	Ben Stiller, Olivia Munn	Flo Rida	
285	"Jolt Cola Explosion at the Old Reference Factory"	July 30, 2012	Colin Farrell, Angie Harmon	thenewno2	
286	"Fear and Loathing and Boredom in Albany"	July 31, 2012	Jeff Daniels, Chantal Sutherland	The Fray	

=== August ===
No.	Title	Original release date	Guest(s)	Musical/entertainment guest(s)	Ref.
287	"The Shark Who Took Small Bites and Chewed Carefully"	August 1, 2012	Jon Cryer, Moon Bloodgood	Jason Mraz	
288	"Audit at Fiscal Point"	August 2, 2012	Will Ferrell	Tenacious D	
289	"Understatement in Hyperbole Town"	August 6, 2012	Eric Stonestreet, Dominic Monaghan	Norah Jones	
290	"The Little Engine That Could, But Chose Not to for Ethical Reasons"	August 7, 2012	Lisa Kudrow, Vince Gilligan	Grouplove	
291	"The Green Lantern 2: Just Kidding, That Won't Happen"	August 8, 2012	Steve Carell, Ronda Rousey	Ziggy Marley	
292	"Penny for Your Thoughts and a Dollar for Your Social Security Number"	August 9, 2012	Matt LeBlanc, Travis Pastrana with Nitro Circus	Andy Haynes	
293	"The Land That Time Totally Blanked On"	August 27, 2012	Dax Shepard, Wendy Williams	Silversun Pickups	
294	"Are You There, God? It's Me, Murder"	August 28, 2012	Isla Fisher, Dean Norris	Andrew W.K.	
295	"Retweet This Title and Get Big Savings on Your Next Purchase of Conan Cereal!"	August 29, 2012	Kristen Bell, Rebel Wilson	Owl City and Carly Rae Jepsen	
296	"The Pimp with the Limp Who Loved to Eat Shrimp"	August 30, 2012	Kyra Sedgwick, Mike Birbiglia	Dominic Dierkes	

=== September ===
No.	Title	Original release date	Guest(s)	Musical/entertainment guest(s)	Ref.
297	"The Improbable Rise of John Yeastlessbread"	September 4, 2012	David Mizejewski, Kunal Nayyar	Todd Barry	
298	"The Mayan Hunky Firefighter Calendar"	September 5, 2012	Lauren Graham, Rob Delaney	Best Coast	
299	"Then the Clock Struck 12, 11 Central Time, 10 Mountain Time"	September 6, 2012	Seth Green, Mary Lynn Rajskub	Milo Greene	
300	"The Murder of Steve Victim"	September 10, 2012	Kelsey Grammer, NeNe Leakes	The Head and the Heart	
301	"The Surprisingly Well-Adjusted Later Life of Honey Boo Boo"	September 11, 2012	Eva Longoria, James Marsden	Roy Wood, Jr.	
302	"Green Eggs and Jon Hamm"	September 12, 2012	Bob Costas, Lake Bell	The Hives	
303	"One Hundred Years of Solitude (Thanks a Lot, Garlic)"	September 13, 2012	Steven Ho, James Van Der Beek	The Walkmen	
304	"The Incredible Stuff of Non-Specific Guy"	September 17, 2012	Simon Cowell and Demi Lovato	Nancy and Beth	
305	"Milk, Milk, Lemonade, Around the Corner Fudge Is Outsourced to India"	September 18, 2012	Chris Colfer, Adam Scott	Nikki Glaser	
306	"The Boy Who Cried Wolf Blitzer"	September 19, 2012	Simon Helberg, Anna Kendrick	Delta Rae	
307	"Scott Pilgrim vs. the World Wildlife Federation"	September 20, 2012	Ricky Gervais, Tig Notaro	Frank Turner	
308	"Catcher in the Rye 2: The Catchening"	September 24, 2012	Elizabeth Banks, Jordan Peele	Animal Collective	
309	"The OCD Postman Always Rings Twice, Forty Times in a Row"	September 25, 2012	Nathan Fillion, Bill Burr	Band of Horses	
310	"Journey to the Return of Revenge Against the Fight"	September 26, 2012	Joseph Gordon-Levitt, Emily Deschanel	Jamie Lee	
311	"Beach Blanket Bunker: The Untold Story of Hitler and His Prize Surfboard"	September 27, 2012	Jake Gyllenhaal, Karen Gillan	The Chevin	

=== October ===
No.	Title	Original release date	Guest(s)	Musical/entertainment guest(s)	Ref.
312	"Butt Slayer 4: Rise of the Non-Butts"	October 1, 2012	Rashida Jones, Adam DeVine	The Shins	
313	"The Berenstain Bears Quietly Convert to Judaism"	October 2, 2012	Timothy Olyphant, Ashley Greene	Hari Kondabolu	
314	"The Overpriced Organic Grapes of Wrath"	October 3, 2012	Jennifer Garner, Terry Crews	Tegan and Sara	
315	"License and Wegistwation, Said the Baby Cop"	October 4, 2012	Jenny McCarthy, J. J. Abrams	Slash with Myles Kennedy and the Conspirators	
316	"Never Bring a Knife to a Hot Dog Eating Contest"	October 15, 2012	Patton Oswalt, Cheryl Hines	Michael Kiwanuka	
317	"Love Potion Number MGD 64"	October 16, 2012	Kevin Nealon, Steven Yeun	Ty Segall	
318	"Return and Return and Return to OCD Mountain"	October 17, 2012	Anthony Anderson, Alex Wagner	Ellie Goulding	
319	"Fool Me Thrice, Shame on Amnesia"	October 18, 2012	Jeff Goldblum, Maggie Q	Sean O'Connor	
320	"There's Something Suspicious About Professor Murder"	October 22, 2012	Aziz Ansari, Chuck Lorre	Kendrick Lamar	
321	"Seth Swisher's Sushi Switcharoo"	October 23, 2012	Will Arnett, Erin Burnett	Harry Shearer with Fountains of Wayne	
322	"When a Pterodactyl Is in the Next Stall, the P Is Silent"	October 24, 2012	Rainn Wilson, Elisha Cuthbert	Two Door Cinema Club	
323	"A Man, a Tan, a Terrible Plan"	October 25, 2012	Simon Baker, Kaitlin Olson	Reggie Watts	
324	"Part Four 6: Part Twelve"	October 29, 2012	Krysten Ritter, Blake Griffin	Bob Mould	
325	"Where There's Smoke, There's Gladys the Smoker"	October 30, 2012	Tom Nardone, Katey Sagal, Hunter Pence	N/A	
326	"Dracula Meets Frankenstein, But Only for Coffee"	October 31, 2012	Chelsea Handler, Nat Faxon	needtobreathe	

=== November ===
No.	Title	Original release date	Guest(s)	Musical/entertainment guest(s)	Ref.
327	"The AARP Guide to Sexting"	November 1, 2012	John C. Reilly, Casey Wilson	Cory Chisel and The Wandering Sons	
328	"Superman Takes Ambien and Accidentally Sleep-Destroys Tokyo"	November 5, 2012	Sarah Silverman, Brian Austin Green	Father John Misty	
329	"Saw VI: The Past Tense of See VI"	November 6, 2012	Mindy Kaling, Willard Wigan	Barry Rothbart	
330	"I've Got 100 Problems, and Yes, Karen Is One of Them"	November 7, 2012	Russell Brand, Dave Attell	Cat Power	
331	"The Day They Announced Five More Twilight Movies"	November 8, 2012	Javier Bardem, Lauren Cohan	Brandi Carlile	
332	"'Boo!', Said Boo Radley When Asked What His Name Was"	November 13, 2012	Joel McHale, James "Bobo" Fay	Samuel Comroe	
333	"The Vague Man Who Said Something"	November 14, 2012	Kristen Stewart, Glenn Howerton	Lianne La Havas	
334	"The Lorax XXX"	November 15, 2012	Kellan Lutz, Jimmy Pardo	JEFF the Brotherhood	
335	"What Does Not Kill You, Only Makes You Decide to Sell Your Hang Gliding Equipment on eBay"	November 26, 2012	Kate Walsh, Billy Connolly	Wild Belle	
336	"Dial N for 'Not How You Spell Murder'"	November 27, 2012	Mel Brooks, Kristen Schaal	Jon Dore^{[A]}	
337	"Surprise, Fourth Graders, You're the Mets!"	November 28, 2012	Jessica Biel, Marc Maron	Alice Cooper	
338	"The Unicorn That Hated Little Girls"	November 29, 2012	Jason Sudeikis, Dick Van Dyke	Nas with Anthony Hamilton	

=== December ===
No.	Title	Original release date	Guest(s)	Musical/entertainment guest(s)	Ref.
339	"The Lion, the Witch, and the Ward Boss"	December 3, 2012	Zachary Quinto, Sasha Alexander	Punch Brothers	
340	"The Puppy Photo That Got 42 Dislikes"	December 4, 2012	Amy Poehler, Kevin Pollak	Ke$ha	
341	"Honey, Can You Please Help Me Open This Can of Whoop-Ass?"	December 5, 2012	Jim Parsons, Jennifer Carpenter	Delta Spirit	
342	"The Announcer Who Couldn't Sing"	December 6, 2012	Ty Burrell, W. Kamau Bell	The Gaslight Anthem	
343	"Star Wars Episode 7: A Cautiously Optimistic Hope"	December 10, 2012	Seth MacFarlane, Retta	Jack White	
344	"The Narcoleptic Insomniac"	December 11, 2012	Nick Offerman, Chris O'Dowd	Graham Park & The Rumour	
345	"Conan's Got a Cold"	December 12, 2012	Michael C. Hall, Charlyne Yi	Tommy Johnagin	
346	"The Unfortunate Rap Career of Dr. Dreidel"	December 13, 2012	Armie Hammer, Sheamus	Ryan Adams with Don Was and Cindy Cashdollar	
347	"Melf Hunters 3: North Polin'"	December 17, 2012	Amanda Seyfried, Adam Pally	Jon Dore with Rory Scovel and Sarah Chalke	
348	"The Grinch Who Returned Christmas for Full Store Credit"	December 18, 2012	Chris Pratt, Anna Torv	José James	
349	"The Present with No Air Holes That Stopped Meowing"	December 19, 2012	Aubrey Plaza, Natalie Irish	Kyle Kinane	
350	"Whatever You Do, Do Not Do a Google Image Search for 'Geese-a-Laying'"	December 20, 2012	Paul Rudd, Rita Wilson	Ben Gibbard with Trio Ellas	

== Notes ==
^{A} Jon Dore's scheduled appearance on November 27, 2012 was cancelled. He instead performed on December 17, 2012.
