= Cherpumple =

Dessert made from various cakes and pies

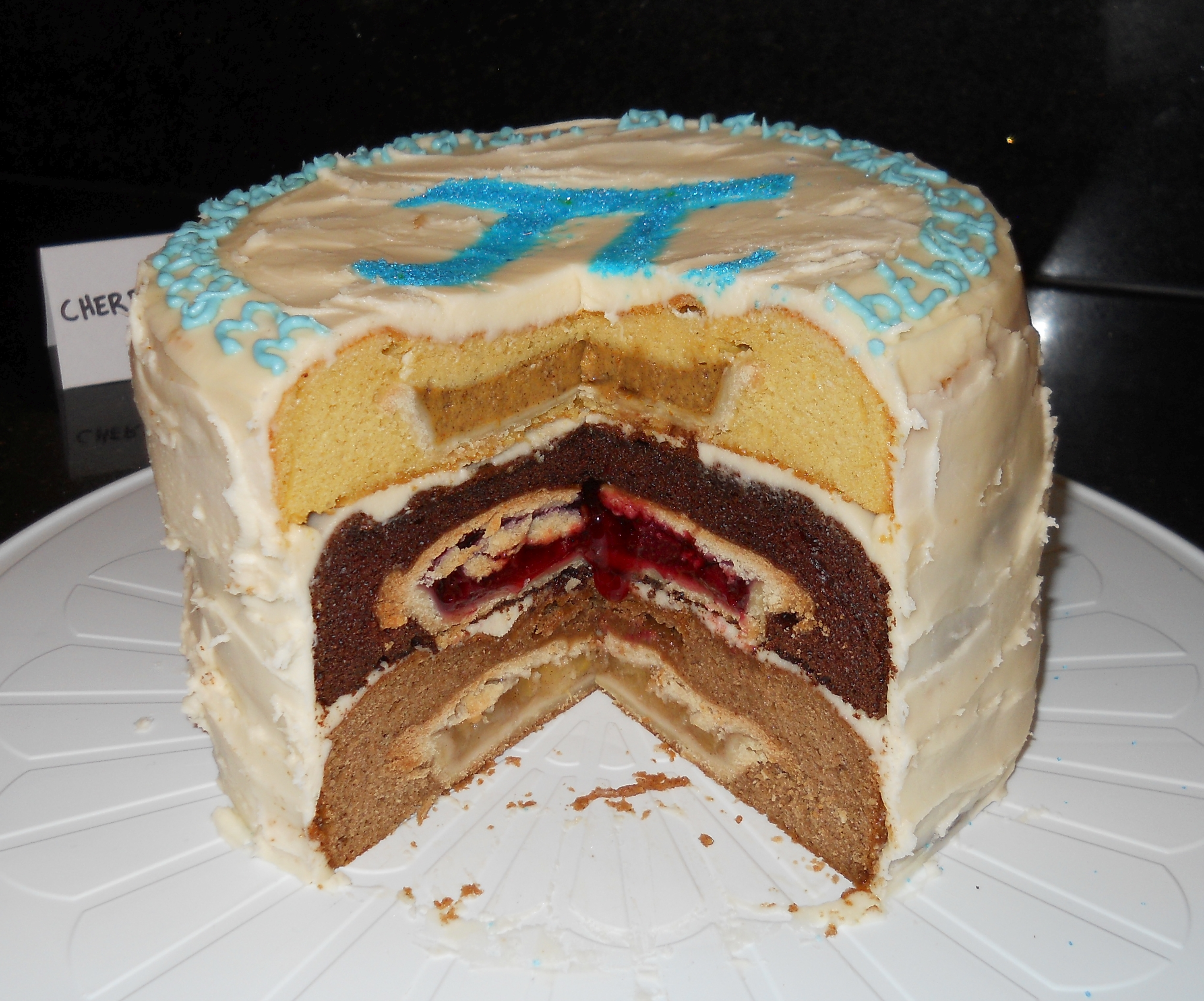
- A cherpumple decorated for Pi Day, cut to show layers (2015)
- Type: Dessert (pie and cake)
- Place of origin: United States
- Created by: Charles Phoenix
- Invented: 2009
- Main ingredients: Cherry, apple, pumpkin

A cherpumple is a holiday novelty dessert inspired by Turducken, where several different flavor pies are baked inside of several different flavors of cake, and then stacked together. The combined dessert is coated in cream cheese frosting. According to the Cherpumple's creator, pop culture humorist Charles Phoenix, "Cherpumple is short for cherry, pumpkin and apple pie. The apple pie is baked in spice cake, the pumpkin in yellow and the cherry in white."

Cherpumple was invented in 2009. Phoenix noticed that his family often took a slice of each dessert that was made for holidays, so he decided to create a single dessert that combined all of the flavors. He has since promoted several different varieties of the Cherpumple on his website, including the Fourth of July themed "cherbluble", in which cherry, blueberry and apple pies are baked into red, white and blue-colored white cakes.

Making a cherpumple can take up to three days, because each layer must cool before they are combined. Using boxed or frozen pies can improve the results as they have more structural integrity than homemade pies.

== See also ==
- List of cherry dishes
- List of desserts
