= Charles Phoenix =

American pop culture humorist, historian, author and chef

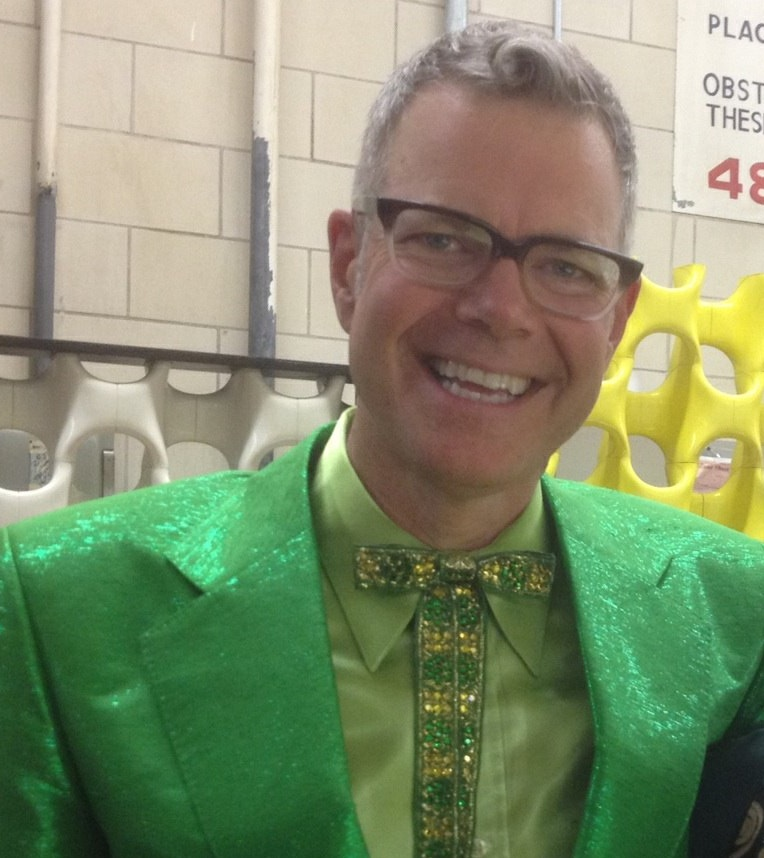
- Phoenix at a holiday show, 2014
- Born: December 20, 1962 (age 63); Ontario, California, U.S.
- Occupations: Humorist, historian, author, chef
- Years active: 1998–present
- Website: www.charlesphoenix.com

Charles Phoenix (born December 20, 1962) is an American pop culture humorist, historian, author and chef whose work explores 1950s and 1960s kitsch and Americana.

Phoenix is widely known for his "Retro slide shows" featuring a collection of vintage film slides capturing mid-century American life and culture—set to Phoenix's commentary. He is also known for his "test kitchen" creations of exaggerated novelty foods and desserts, including the Cherpumple, a three-layer cake/pie hybrid. Phoenix has appearanced as a recurring judge on the Food Network series Cake Wars and served as a frequent guest commentator on NPR and KCET.

== Biography ==
=== Early life ===
Phoenix was born in Upland, California in 1962 and raised in neighboring Ontario, the son of a used car salesman and a "happy homemaker. He traces his love of things vintage and retro to his early years spent on his father's used car lot, where he became enamored with the automobiles, which he learned to identify by make, model and year by the time he was six. Phoenix's obsession with classic cars ultimately led to his interest in mid-century architecture, fashion and photography.

In 1982, Phoenix moved to Los Angeles and attended the Fashion Institute of Design & Merchandising, after which he started working as a fashion designer. According to Phoenix, after repeatedly getting fired from every design job, he returned to his first passion and began a second career buying and selling classic cars.

=== Retro Slide Shows ===
In 1992, Phoenix was shopping for vintage clothing when he came across a shoebox labeled "Trip Across the U.S., 1957" filled Kodachrome color slides of an unidentified family's vacation photos at numerous roadside landmarks. Fascinated by the vivid color depictions of the era, Phoenix began scouring thrift stores, flea markets, and estate sales buying boxes of slides taken from the late 1940-1970s, amassing a sizable collection.

Phoenix began developing his slide show in the mid-1990s when he would show his collection with accompanying commentary to his friends and acquaintances at private parties. Encouraged by his friends, Phoenix took a chance at presenting one of his shows to the general public. His first public event, entitled "God Bless Americana: The Retro Vacation Slide Show of the USA", was held at the California Map and Travel Store in Los Angeles in 1998. According to Phoenix, he originally intended for his slide shows to be straightforward and serious presentations, but the inherent kitsch of his slides invoked frequent laughter from the audience, prompting Phoenix to restructure his show with a more comedic tone. Phoenix now takes an observational comedy and storytelling approach to his slide presentations, usually attempting to employ a narrative using what few facts Phoenix can derive from the slides' annotations with his knowledge bank of history and pop culture trivia as well as juxtaposing slides from different collections, though he emphatically states that he never fabricates any portion of his narration.

Despite the overtly comedic tone of his slide shows, Phoenix has stressed that his shows are explicitly about honoring and celebrating American culture rather than mocking it. Describing his shows as "history disguised as comedy and comedy disguised as history", he has been quoted as saying "My goal, first off and foremost, is to entertain people, but just below the line of entertainment is to educate and respect the past", hoping that through humor he can instill an appreciation and admiration for mid-century culture in people otherwise uninterested or unaware of such topics.

Get in touch with your inner Americana, embrace it, have a sense of humor about it, and proudly share it with the whole wide world.

— Charles Phoenix's Americana "mantra".

Bolstered by excellent critical reviews in publications such as the Los Angeles Times Magazine, Phoenix's slide shows quickly grew into bigger and more elaborate events which started appearing all throughout Los Angeles, including at such prestigious venues as the REDCAT at the Walt Disney Concert Hall, the Egyptian Theatre, the John Anson Ford Amphitheatre and the Museum of Contemporary Art. Phoenix started developing different versions of his Retro Slide Shows, typically focusing on various aspects of California life and culture as well as holiday-themed shows and city-specific presentations for events held in locations including Palm Springs, Anaheim, Long Beach and San Francisco. Phoenix eventually began taking his slide shows outside of California, usually visiting states within the southwest and going as far as Denver, Colorado and New York City, where his show "God Bless Americana" won "Most Unique Theatrical Performance" at the 2003 New York International Fringe Festival. For these out-of-state shows, Phoenix typically arrives several days ahead of his performance to explore and photograph the area's local sights, then spends approximately eight or nine hours sifting through vintage slides of the city in question and coupling them with his recent photographs to create a unique show.

Having searched through "millions" of color slides "looking for information and elements of great photography", Phoenix likens the process to gold panning, and estimates that approximately only one out of every 3,000 slides makes it into his collection. As of 2014, Phoenix's "slibrary" contained more than 200,000 slides and he enlists the help of a "slibrarian" to assist him in sorting through his constantly growing collection on a weekly basis. As Phoenix and his shows grew in popularity, fans from around the country started sending him their own slides; Phoenix has said that he rarely ever searches for slides in thrift stores anymore as they've been consistently arriving at his home for over a decade.

=== Charles Phoenix Test Kitchen ===
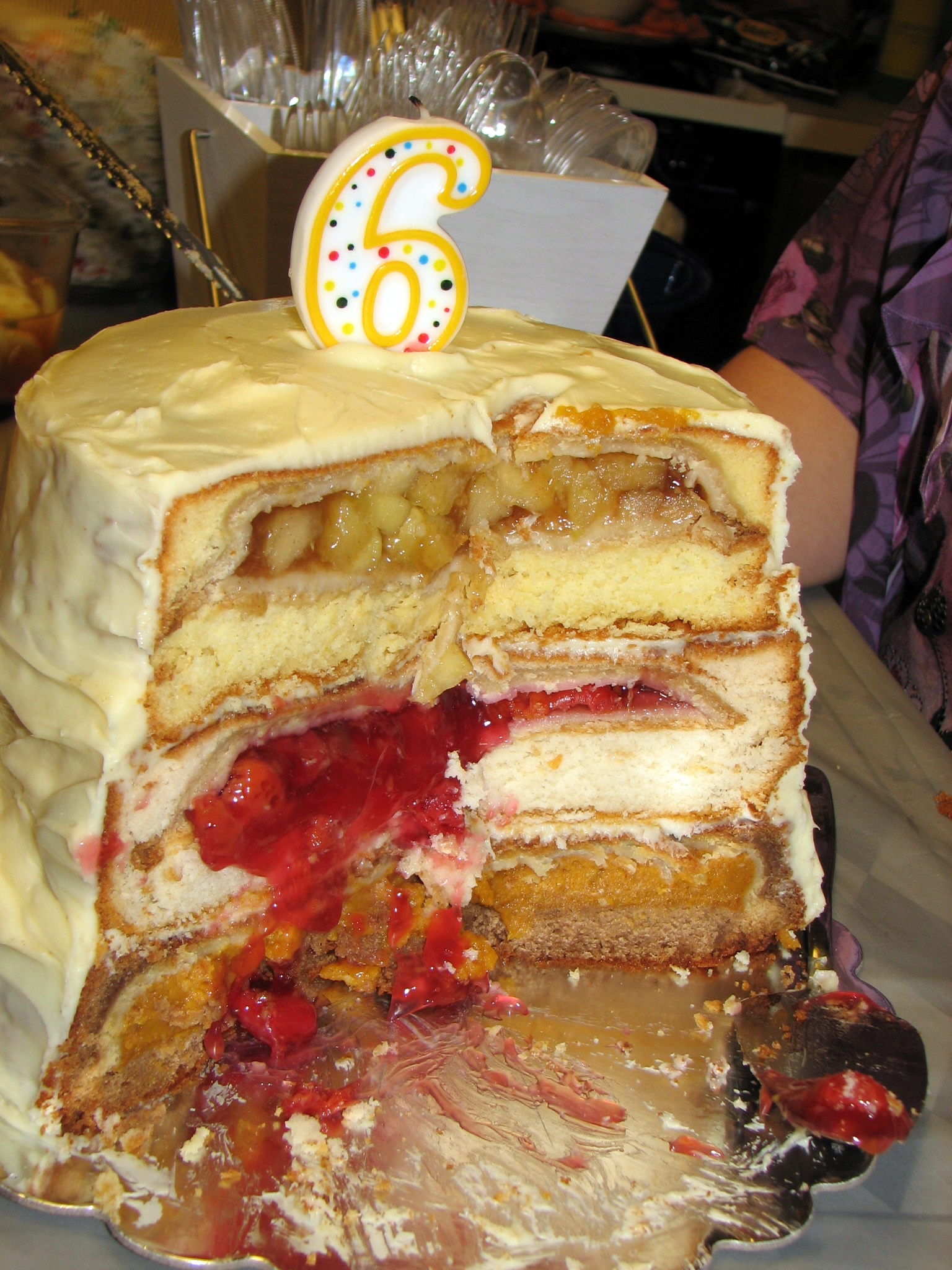
The Cherpumple cake/pie hybrid, Phoenix's most well-known culinary creation.

Phoenix is also popular for what he calls "The Charles Phoenix test kitchen" where he crafts decadent, exaggerated and occasionally grotesque novelty foods and desserts inspired by classic dishes from the past. Claiming to "put the kitsch in kitchen", Phoenix's recipes are largely based more on presentation rather than flavor; he admitted in a 2012 interview, "I'm a hack in the kitchen, I really am", noting elsewhere "This is not fine food, this is fun food!" which he encourages people to experiment with in their own kitchens. His most famous creation is the Cherpumple, in which cherry, apple and pumpkin pies are baked into several different flavors of cake and then stacked together, a concoction which The Wall Street Journal dubbed "the turducken of desserts" and The Huffington Post described as "awesome and absolutely offensive all in one".

Among some of Phoenix's other creations include "Bambrosinana", a layered fusion of banana pudding and ambrosia, "Inchezonya", a hybrid of enchilada and lasagna, "Fried Cereal", a sugar-sautéed snack mix of breakfast cereals, "Frosty the Cheeseball Man", a snowman constructed out of Velveeta and cream cheese which is melted into fondue, meatloafs molded into various shapes ranging from tiki heads to giant rats, numerous multi-layered cakes incorporating such ingredients as breakfast cereals, marshmallow Peeps and jelly beans, and a lighted Jell-O Christmas tree which uses an orange traffic cone for a mold and contains working Christmas lights.

Most of Phoenix's appearances on national television involve his unusual food crafting. In 2010 and 2013, he appeared on Conan O'Brien's talk show Conan making two holiday-themed dishes, the "Astro-Weenie Christmas Tree", an aluminum foil-covered cone skewered with meat, fruit and vegetables, and a lamb-shaped meatloaf "frosted" with mashed potatoes. Phoenix also demonstrated the "Astro-Weenie Christmas Tree" along with a striped candy cane cake on a 2013 episode of The Queen Latifah Show and, on a Halloween-themed episode, a Jack-o'-lantern version of his cheeseball fondue sculpture.

=== Other endeavors ===
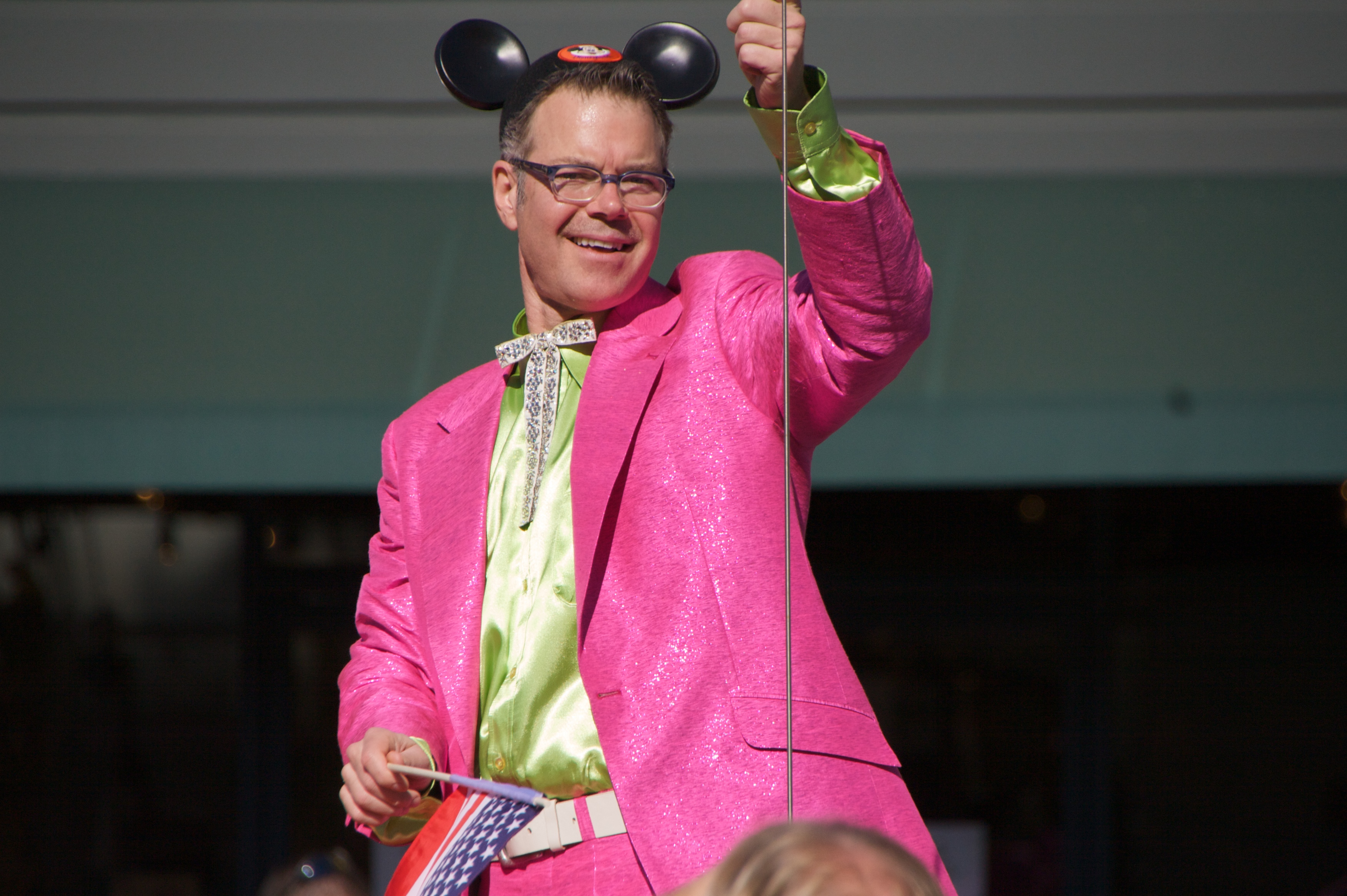
Phoenix as grand marshal at the 2009 Doo Dah Parade.

In addition to his slide shows, Phoenix has hosted several humorous bus and walking tours of Los Angeles since the early 2000s, ranging from the "Retro School Bus Field Trip Tour", which shuttles guests around in a vintage school bus to various mid-century landmarks highlighting Googie architecture, ranch-style tract homes, drive-in theaters and Space Age neon signs, to the "Yesterday Once More" tour of Downey, which visited locations related to the Downey-based pop duo The Carpenters. Phoenix became most recognized for his "Disneyland Tour of Downtown Los Angeles", a six-hour tour in which he illustrates the parallels between the design and architecture of Downtown Los Angeles to that of Disneyland, such as Clifton's Cafeteria mirroring Frontierland, the Bob Baker Marionette Theater to Fantasyland, Olvera Street and Broadway to Main Street, U.S.A. and so forth. The tour, which received ample coverage from the likes of LA Weekly and the Los Angeles Times, proved so popular that it expanded from being held every few months to a regular bi-monthly engagement.

Phoenix has authored and co-authored several coffee table books dedicated to vintage Americana, showcasing many of the slides he has in his collection. He has written and compiled three books specifically about Southern California – Cruising the Pomona Valley 1930 thru 1970 (1999), Southern Californialand: Mid-Century Culture in Kodachrome (2004) and Southern California in the '50s: Sun, Fun and Fantasy (2011) – as well as two books detailing a wider scope of American culture, God Bless Americana (2002) and Americana the Beautiful: Mid-Century Culture in Kodachrome (2006). With co-author Fred E. Basten, Phoenix contributed to 1999's Leis, Luaus, and Alohas, a similar coffee table book about Hawaii in the 1950s, and Fabulous Las Vegas in the 50s.

In August 2008, it was announced that PBS affiliate KOCE-TV would produce 18 episodes of a thirty-minute Los Angeles-based travel series hosted by Phoenix called Southern CaliforniaLand, though the series ultimately failed to progress past the development stages.

In 2009, Phoenix served as grand marshal for the 32nd annual Doo Dah Parade in Pasadena, and in 2012 he appeared as part of the Rose Parade on the city of Downey's tiki-themed float.

=== Image and lifestyle ===
Phoenix has been called the "King of Retro" by the Los Angeles Times, while LA Weekly has given him titles ranging from "King of Kitsch", "Knight of Nostalgia and "Chancellor of Cheese". Phoenix uses the self-appointed title of "The Ambassador of Americana", while also describing himself as "a man with a particular Pee-wee Herman, Martha Stewart and Huell Howser sensibility". He is particularly noted for his eccentric dress which generally utilizes bright colors and unusual patterns which Phoenix admits "push the edges of good taste" and draw heavily on the stereotypical dress of a used car salesman.

Phoenix has mentioned in interviews that he practically lives the vintage lifestyle which he celebrates, noting that "nothing in my apartment is new...I prefer everything to be between 40 and 60 years old". He has further said to have never driven a modern car, saying "classic cars, American cars are in my blood". Among the cars Phoenix has owned include a 1959 Dodge Coronet, a 1960 Ford Fairlane 500 and most recently, a 1961 Pontiac Bonneville. Despite Phoenix's retro lifestyle and interests, he has expressed a preference for living in the present. "One thing we don't see in the photos – or if we do see it we don't want to acknowledge it – is what a repressed and conformist society it was", he said in an interview with Time Out Chicago, "I'm happy to be alive today."

== Bibliography ==
- Cruising the Pomona Valley 1930 thru 1970. Horn of Plenty Press. 1999. ISBN 978-0967292106.
- Phoenix, Charles; Basten, Fred E. (1999). Leis, Luaus, and Alohas: The Lure of Hawai'i in the Fifties. Island Heritage. ISBN 978-0896103979.
- Phoenix, Charles; Basten, Fred E. (1999). Fabulous Las Vegas in the 50s: Glitz, Glamour & Games. Angel City Press. ISBN 978-1883318055.
- Southern California in the '50s: Sun, Fun and Fantasy. Angel City Press. 2001. ISBN 978-1883318994.
- God Bless Americana: A Retro Vacation Slide Show Tour of the USA. Graphic Arts Books. 2002. ISBN 978-1558686441.
- Southern Californialand: Mid-Century Culture in Kodachrome. Angel City Press. 2004. ISBN 978-1883318420.
- Americana the Beautiful: Mid-Century Culture in Kodachrome. Angel City Press. 2006. ISBN 978-1883318543.
- Sandler, Stuart (2014). Kiddie Cocktails. Foreword by Charles Phoenix. Korero Press. ISBN 978-0957664913.
- Addicted To Americana: Celebrating Classic & Kitschy American Life & Styles. Prospect Park Books. 2017. ISBN 978-1945551192.

== Filmography ==
=== Television appearances ===
- Movies That Shook the World - "American Graffiti" (2005)
- The Martha Stewart Show (2007, 2008)
- Conan (2010, 2013)
- Epic Chef (2012) (internet series)
- Storage Wars (2012)
- The Queen Latifah Show (2013)
- The Garage Show with Jeff Sutphen (2013) (internet series)
- Ben 10: Omniverse (2014) – Voice of Charles Zenith
- Cake Wars (2014–present)
- The Home and Family Show (2015)
- Jay Leno's Garage (2016)
- Nailed It! (2019)

=== Film ===
- The Cool School (2008) – archive and stills
- Bible Storyland (2012) – interviewee
