= The Slide Brothers =

American band

The Slide Brothers are an American band featuring musicians playing lap steel guitar and pedal steel guitar. The band members were all schooled in the Sacred Steel tradition.

They were featured in Conan on TBS and World Cafe on NPR.

== Members ==
- Calvin Cooke
- Darick Campbell
- Chuck Campbell
- Aubrey Ghent

== Discography ==
- Robert Randolph Presents The Slide Brothers (2013)
