= Movies That Shook the World =

- Movies That Shook the World title card
- Genre: Documentary
- Narrated by: Jeff Goldblum
- Country of origin: United States
- No. of seasons: 1
- No. of episodes: 13

Production
- Executive producers: Fenton Bailey; Randy Barbato
- Producers: Natalie Aaron; Jim Eckels
- Running time: 22 minutes
- Production company: World of Wonder

Original release
- Network: AMC
- Release: September 9 – December 30, 2005

Movies That Shook the World is an American documentary television series consisting of 13 episodes that was first broadcast between September 9 and December 30, 2005 on AMC. Each episode dealt with a classic American film.

== Episodes ==
No.	Title	Original release date
1	"Fatal Attraction"	September 9, 2005
2	"The China Syndrome"	September 16, 2005
3	"Do the Right Thing"	September 23, 2005
4	"2001: A Space Odyssey"	September 30, 2005
5	"The Graduate"	October 7, 2005
6	"The Birth of a Nation"	October 14, 2005
7	"The Exorcist"	October 28, 2005
8	"The Last Temptation of Christ"	November 4, 2005
9	"Shaft"	November 18, 2005
10	"American Graffiti"	November 25, 2005
11	"Philadelphia"	December 2, 2005
12	"The Blair Witch Project"	December 9, 2005
13	"Pink Flamingos"	December 16, 2005
